= Bode (crater) =

Crater on the Moon

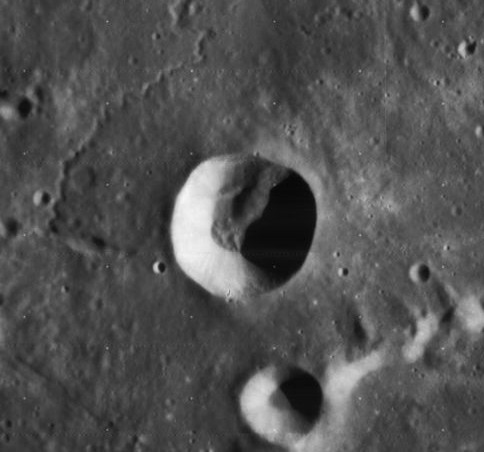
- Lunar Orbiter 4 image. Bode and satellite crater Pallas A south of it.
- Coordinates: 6.7°N 2.4°W
- Diameter: 17.80 km
- Depth: 3.5 km
- Colongitude: 3° at sunrise
- Eponym: Johann E. Bode

Bode is a small, bright crater located near the central region of the Moon, to the northwest of the joined craters Pallas and Murchison. It lies on a region of raised surface between the Mare Vaporum to the northeast, Sinus Aestuum to the west, and Sinus Medii to the southeast.

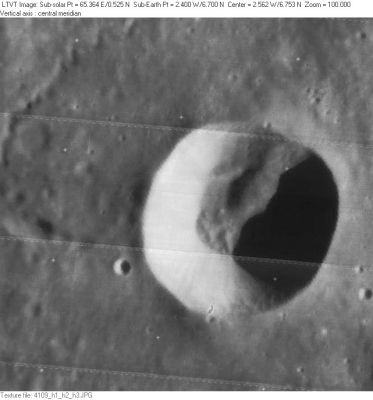
Lunar Orbiter 4 photo, a few streaks appear in this photo including three thicker ones

This circular crater is bowl-shaped, with a small interior floor and a ridge along the inner wall to the northeast. It has a minor ray system that extends for a distance of 130 kilometers. There is a group of rilles located to the west of the crater named the Rimae Bode. Its name comes from the name of the crater. Due to the interesting geology of this region, it has been proposed as a landing site for a future mission to the Moon.

This crater was named after German astronomer Johann Elert Bode (1747-1826). Its designation was formally adopted by the International Astronomical Union in 1935.

Due to its high albedo inner slopes, crater Bode is an easy target during telescopic observations of the full moon. The brightness of Bode is also noticeable on the photographic version of chart LAC 59 (page 118) in The Clementine Atlas of the Moon (Ben Bussey / Paul D. Spudis).

== Satellite craters ==
By convention these features are identified on lunar maps by placing the letter on the side of the crater midpoint that is closest to Bode.

| Bode | Latitude | Longitude | Diameter |
|---|---|---|---|
| A | 9.0° N | 1.2° W | 12 km |
| B | 8.7° N | 3.1° W | 10 km |
| C | 12.2° N | 4.8° W | 7 km |
| D | 7.2° N | 3.3° W | 4 km |
| E | 12.4° N | 3.4° W | 7 km |
| G | 6.4° N | 3.5° W | 4 km |
| H | 12.2° N | 6.5° W | 4 km |
| K | 9.3° N | 2.3° W | 6 km |
| L | 5.6° N | 3.8° W | 5 km |
| N | 10.9° N | 3.9° W | 6 km |

== See also ==
- Asteroid 998 Bodea
