= Ukert (crater) =

Crater on the Moon

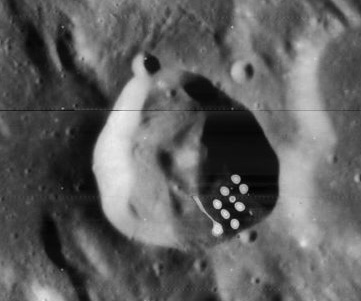
- Mosaic of Lunar Orbiter 4 images (white spots are blemishes on original image)
- Coordinates: 7.8°N 1.4°E
- Diameter: 23 km
- Depth: 3.17 km (1.97 mi)
- Colongitude: 359° at sunrise
- Formation: Lower Imbrian
- Eponym: Friedrich A. Ukert

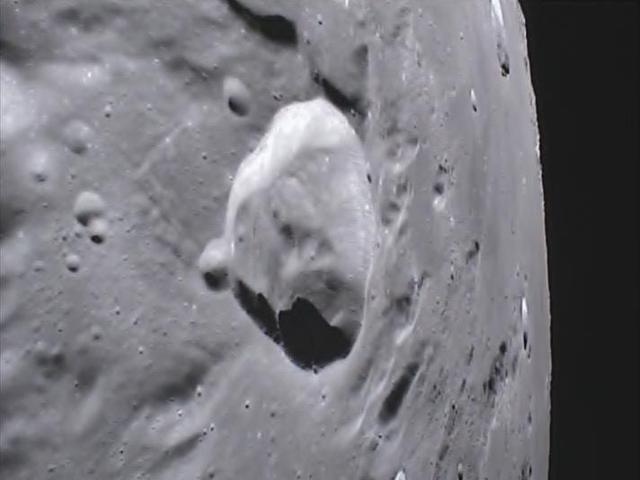
Ukert crater, from GRAIL spacecraft

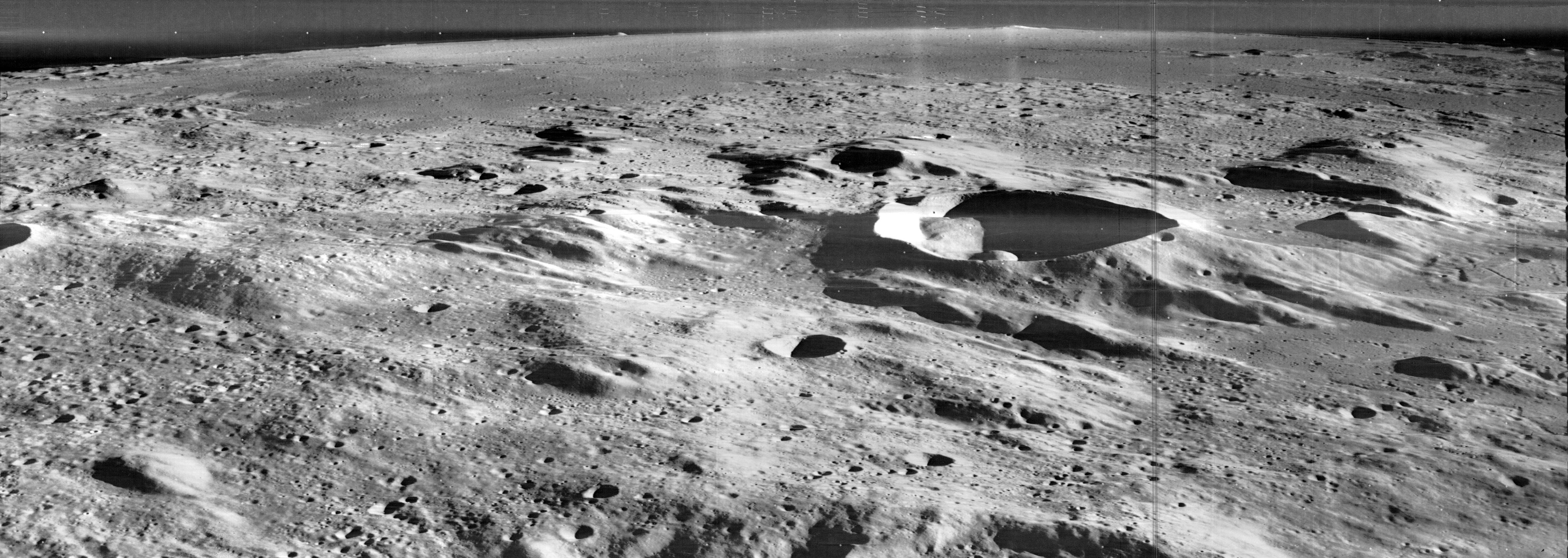
Ukert crater (right of center) is younger than the linear hills of Imbrium Sculpture that it overprints

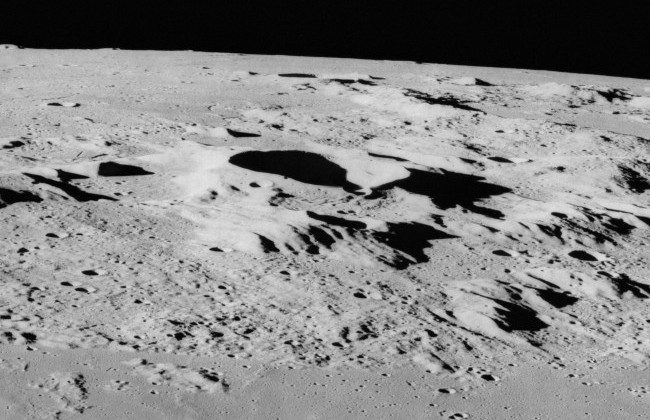
View from Apollo 17

Ukert is a lunar impact crater that lies on a strip of rugged ground between Mare Vaporum to the north and Sinus Medii in the south. It was named after German historian Friedrich August Ukert. It is located to the north-northwest of the crater Triesnecker and northeast of the crater pair of Pallas and Murchison.

The outer rim of this crater is not quite circular, with outward bulges to the north and the east. The interior floor is irregular in places, with a central ridge running from crater midpoint down to the southern wall. There is a tiny craterlet along the northern rim, but otherwise the crater contains no impacts of note.

Ukert is a crater of Lower (Early) Imbrian age.

== Satellite craters ==
By convention these features are identified on lunar maps by placing the letter on the side of the crater midpoint that is closest to Ukert.

Ukert	Latitude	Longitude	Diameter
A	8.7° N	1.3° E	9 km
B	8.3° N	1.3° E	21 km
E	9.0° N	0.4° E	5 km
J	11.1° N	0.6° W	3 km
K	6.5° N	3.7° E	4 km
M	7.9° N	2.3° E	26 km
N	7.6° N	2.0° E	17 km
P	7.8° N	2.9° E	5 km
R	8.2° N	0.7° E	18 km
V	8.7° N	3.2° E	3 km
W	9.5° N	2.3° E	3 km
X	9.2° N	1.9° E	3 km
Y	10.1° N	0.2° E	4 km
