= Blagg (crater) =

Crater on the Moon

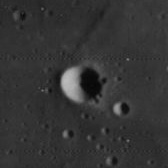
- Lunar Orbiter 4 image
- Coordinates: 1.3°N 1.5°E
- Diameter: 4.97 km (3.09 mi)
- Depth: 0.91 km (0.57 mi)
- Colongitude: 359° at sunrise
- Eponym: Mary A. Blagg

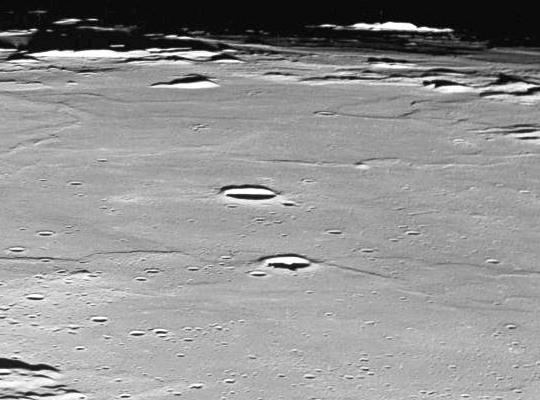
Oblique view facing west with Bruce at center and Blagg below center, from Apollo 10

Blagg is a tiny lunar impact crater located on the Sinus Medii, a small lunar mare near the center of the near side of the Moon. This is a circular crater with limited degradation due to subsequent impacts. The crater diameter is 5.0 km, and it descends 0.9 km below the surrounding mare surface. To the east-southeast of Blagg is the irregular crater Rhaeticus, and northeast lies Triesnecker. Blagg is about 33 km to the east of the slightly larger Bruce.

This crater is named after English astronomer Mary Adela Blagg (1858–1944). She is remembered for her work on selenography and variable stars. The crater name was incorporated into lunar nomenclature by Greek-French selenographer Félix C. Lamèch in 1934. Its designation was formally adopted by the International Astronomical Union in 1935.
