= Chladni (crater) =

Crater on the Moon

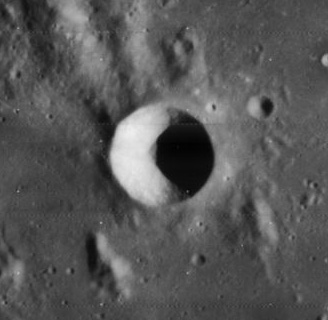
- Lunar Orbiter 4 image
- Coordinates: 4.0°N 1.1°E
- Diameter: 13.07 km (8.12 mi)
- Depth: 2.63 km (1.63 mi)
- Colongitude: 359° at sunrise
- Eponym: Ernst Chladni

Chladni is a small lunar impact crater that lies near the northwest edge of Sinus Medii, in the central part of the Moon. Due east of Chladni is the larger Triesnecker.

The rim of the crater is roughly circular, and there is a small central floor at the midpoint of the sloping inner walls. This feature has a higher albedo than the surrounding terrain, and is an easy to observe bright crater during full moon. It is connected by a low ridge to the rim of the crater Murchison, which lies to the northwest.

The crater is named for German physicist and musician Ernst Chladni (1756-1827). In 1794, he wrote the first book on meteorites. During the 19th century, his name was included in the lunar nomenclature of Wilhelm G. Lohrmann. Its designation was officially adopted by the International Astronomical Union in 1935.
