= Bodea =

Bodea may refer to:

- 998 Bodea, a main-belt asteroid
- Cosmin Bodea, Romanian football manager and former player
