= Bruce (crater) =

Crater on the Moon

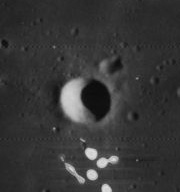
- Lunar Orbiter 4 image (White blemish is present on original image)
- Coordinates: 1.1°N 0.4°E
- Diameter: 6.14 km (3.82 mi)
- Depth: 1.25 km (0.78 mi)
- Colongitude: 0° at sunrise
- Eponym: Catherine W. Bruce

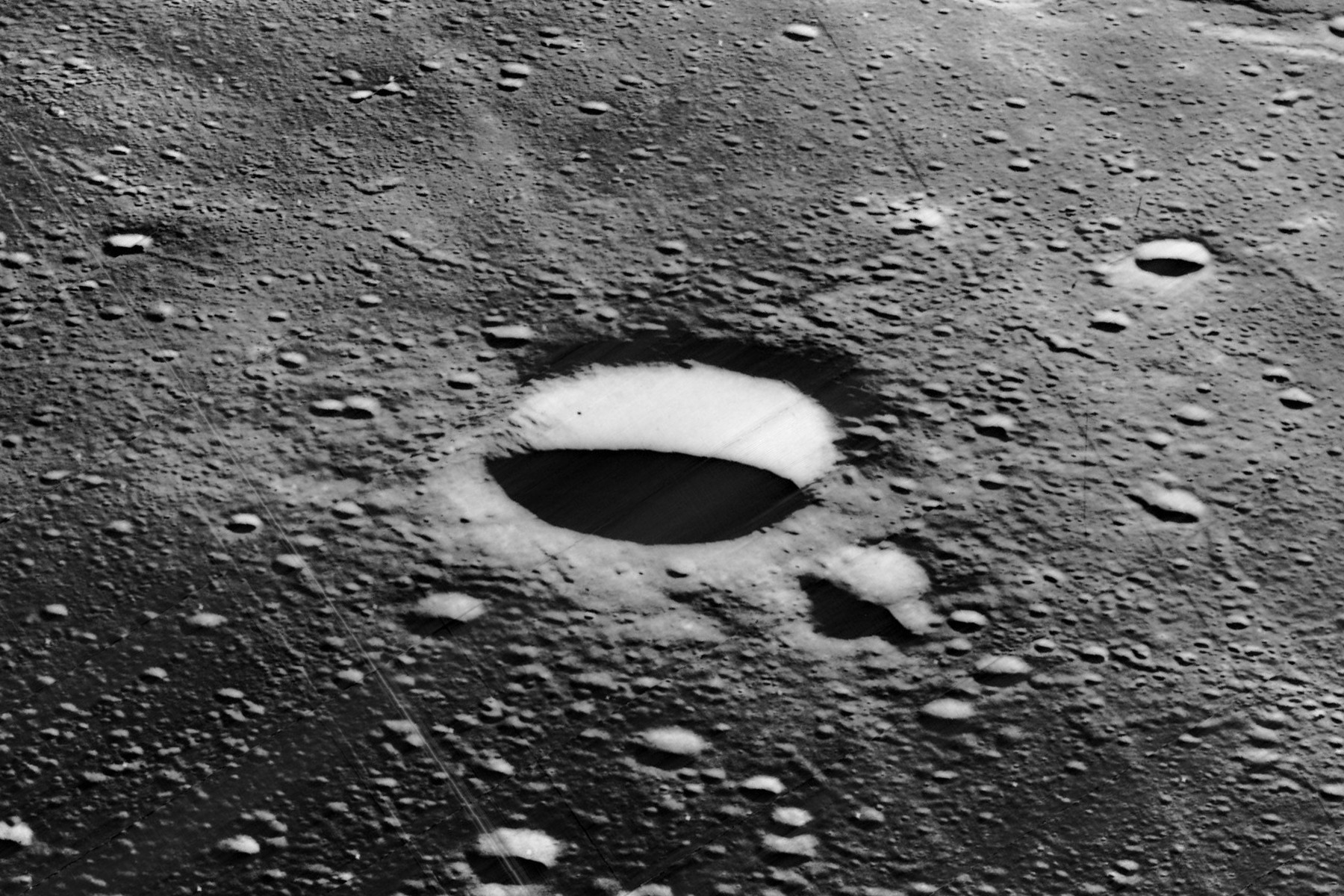
View facing west from Lunar Orbiter 3

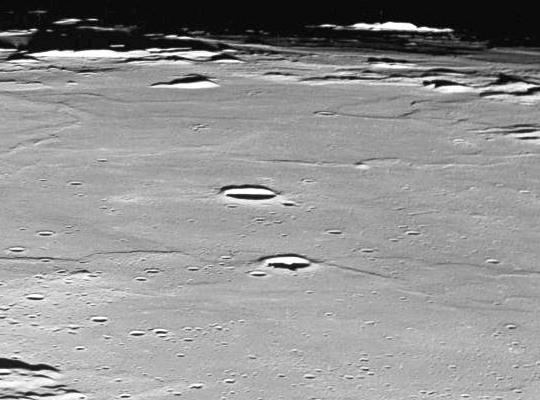
Oblique view facing west with Bruce at center and Blagg below center, from Apollo 10

Bruce is a small lunar impact crater located in the small lunar mare Sinus Medii. It lies to the west-northwest of the irregular crater Rhaeticus, and is about 33 km to the west of the even smaller Blagg.

This feature is circular and cup-shaped, with no notable impacts overlaying the rim or interior. The interior has a generally higher albedo than the surrounding terrain, but there is a band of darker material cross the midpoint of the crater from west to east. It is surrounded by lunar mare, with a few tiny craterlets in the surface to the east.

Less than forty kilometres to the southeast is the original point of the selenographic coordinate system. From the floor of this crater the Earth always appears at the zenith. Both the Surveyor 4 and Surveyor 6 probes landed about 50 km to the southwest of Bruce.

This crater is named for Catherine Wolfe Bruce (1816-1900), an American philanthropist and patroness of astronomy. Her name was added to lunar nomenclature by Johann N. Krieger and Rudolf König during 1898–1912. Its designation was formally adopted by the International Astronomical Union in 1935.
