= Réaumur (crater) =

Crater on the Moon

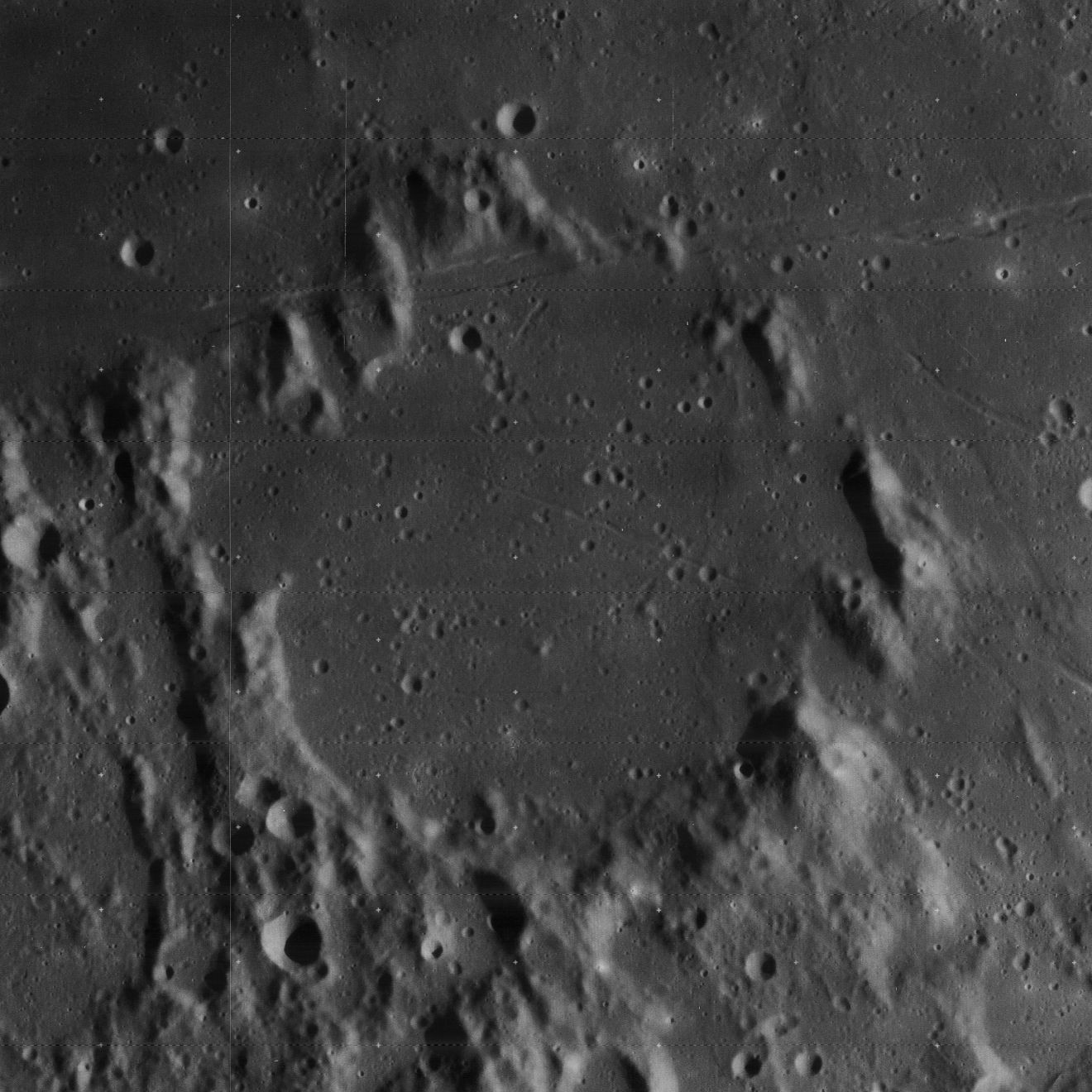
- Lunar Orbiter 4 image
- Coordinates: 2.4°S 0.7°E
- Diameter: 51 km
- Depth: 0.82 km
- Colongitude: 0° at sunrise
- Eponym: René de Réaumur

Réaumur is the remains of a lunar impact crater located on the southern edge of Sinus Medii. Its diameter is 51 km. It was named after the 18th century French scientist René de Réaumur. It shares an eroded rim with the similar crater Oppolzer to the northwest. It lies to the northwest of the large walled plain named Hipparchus, and east of Flammarion. To the south is Gyldén, and farther to the south-southwest is Ptolemaeus.

The rim of Réaumur is heavily eroded, and the northern half consists of little more than a series of low ridges in the mare. The southern rim is notched and indented by small crater impacts. The interior floor is relatively smooth and flat with no significant features.

The broken northern rim intersects a rille designated Rima Oppolzer. This feature is about 110 kilometers long and follows a course from the north-northeast to the south-southwest. To the east of the crater rim is a smaller rille designated Rima Réaumur. Farther to the east is the small Seeliger.

== Satellite craters ==
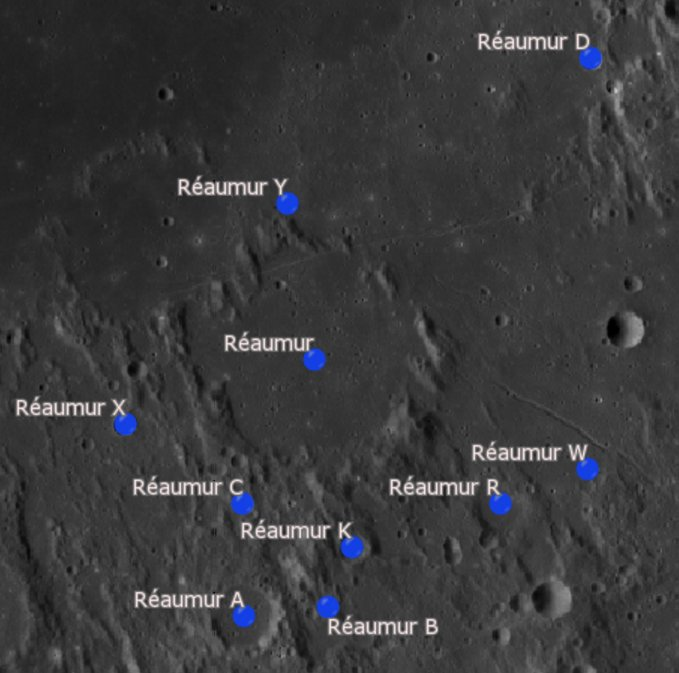
Reaumur and its satellite craters

By convention these features are identified on lunar maps by placing the letter on the side of the crater midpoint that is closest to Réaumur.

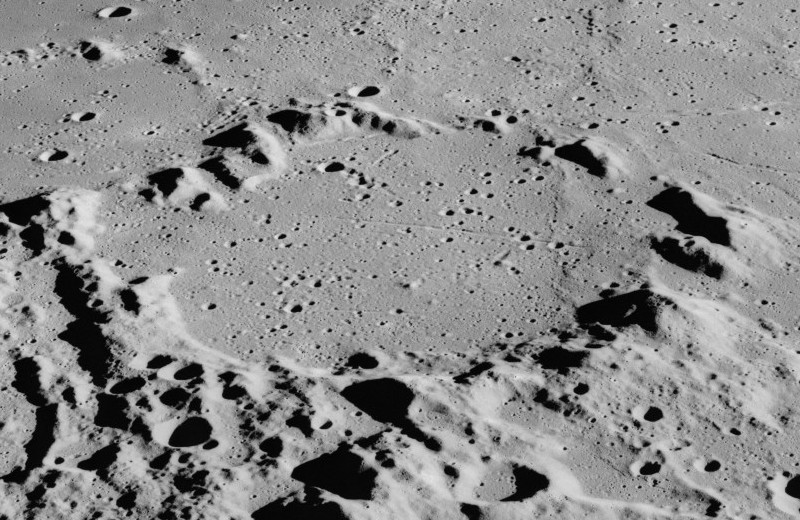
Oblique view from Apollo 16, facing north.

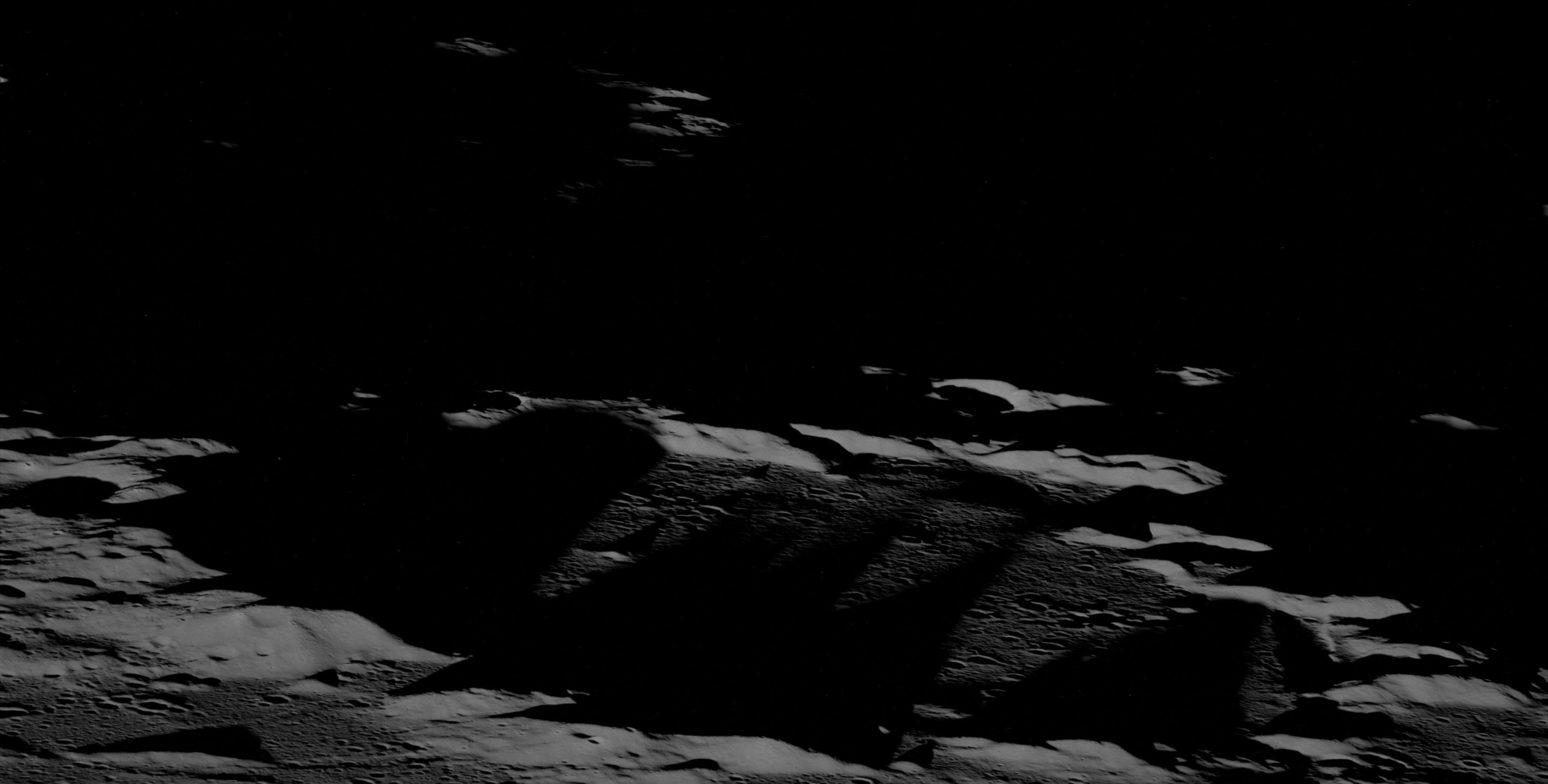
Oblique view from Apollo 10, facing west, while at the sunrise terminator.

Réaumur	Latitude	Longitude	Diameter
A	4.3° S	0.2° E	16 km
B	4.2° S	0.9° E	5 km
C	3.4° S	0.2° E	5 km
D	0.2° S	2.8° E	4 km
K	3.8° S	1.0° E	7 km
R	3.5° S	2.1° E	14 km
W	3.2° S	2.8° E	3 km
X	2.9° S	0.6° W	5 km
Y	1.3° S	0.6° E	3 km
