= Oppolzer (crater) =

Crater on the Moon

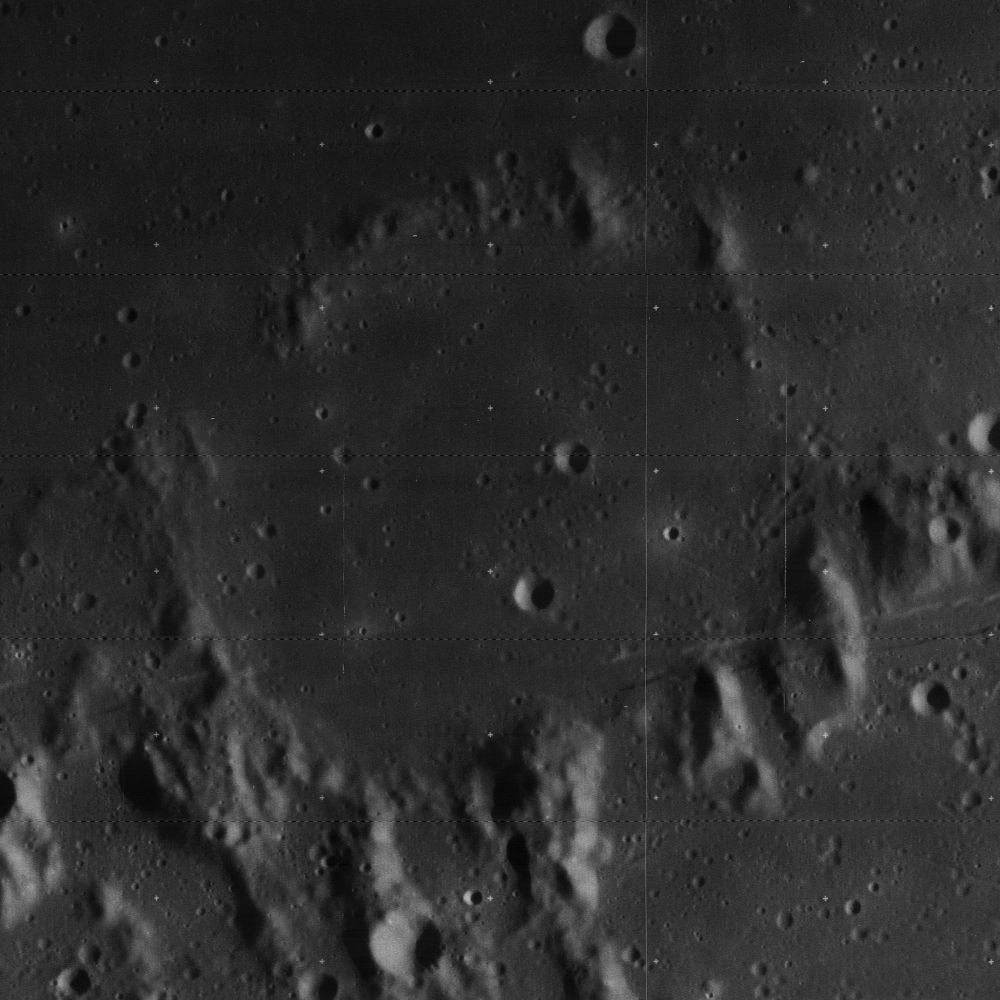
- Lunar Orbiter 4 image
- Coordinates: 1.5°S 0.5°W
- Diameter: 41 km
- Colongitude: 1° at sunrise
- Eponym: Theodor von Oppolzer

Oppolzer is the remnant of a lunar impact crater that is located on the southern edge of Sinus Medii, along the meridian of the Moon. Its diameter is 41 km. It was named after the Austrian astronomer Theodor von Oppolzer. It is located within one crater diameter of the origin of the selenographic coordinate system at 0° N, 0° W. Attached to the surviving remnants of the southeast rim is the crater Réaumur. To the west-southwest is the lava-flooded walled plain Flammarion.

This formation consists of little more than an irregular arc of mounts along the south, and a ring of scattered ridges along the northern rim. There is a particularly wide gap in the rim to the northeast where no ridges survive to mark the crater perimeter. The interior floor has been resurfaced by basaltic lava.

A 110-km-long rille designated Rima Oppolzer passes through the southern part of the crater floor, and continues to the east and west of the crater.

== Satellite craters ==
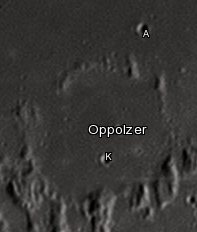
Oppolzer crater and its satellite craters taken from Earth in 2012 at the University of Hertfordshire's Bayfordbury Observatory with the telescopes Meade LX200 14" and Lumenera Skynyx 2-1

By convention these features are identified on lunar maps by placing the letter on the side of the crater midpoint that is closest to Oppolzer.

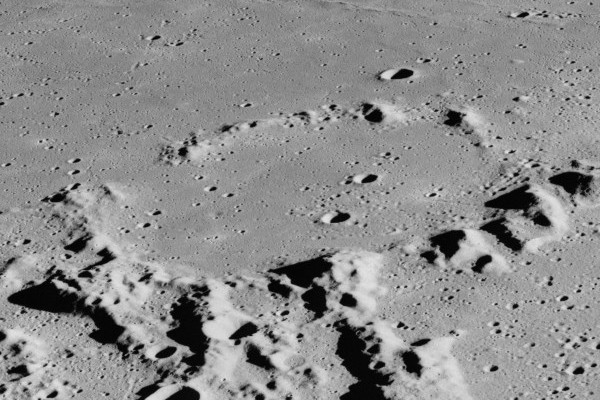
Oblique view from Apollo 16, facing north.

Oppolzer	Latitude	Longitude	Diameter
A	0.5° S	0.3° W	3 km
K	1.7° S	0.3° W	3 km
