= Rhaeticus =

Rhaeticus may refer to:

- Georg Joachim Rheticus, a mathematician
- Rhaeticus (crater), a lunar crater named after the mathematician
