= Franz de Paula Triesnecker =

Austrian Jesuit astronomer

Franz de Paula Triesnecker (2 April 1745 – 29 January 1817) was an Austrian Jesuit astronomer.

== Biography ==
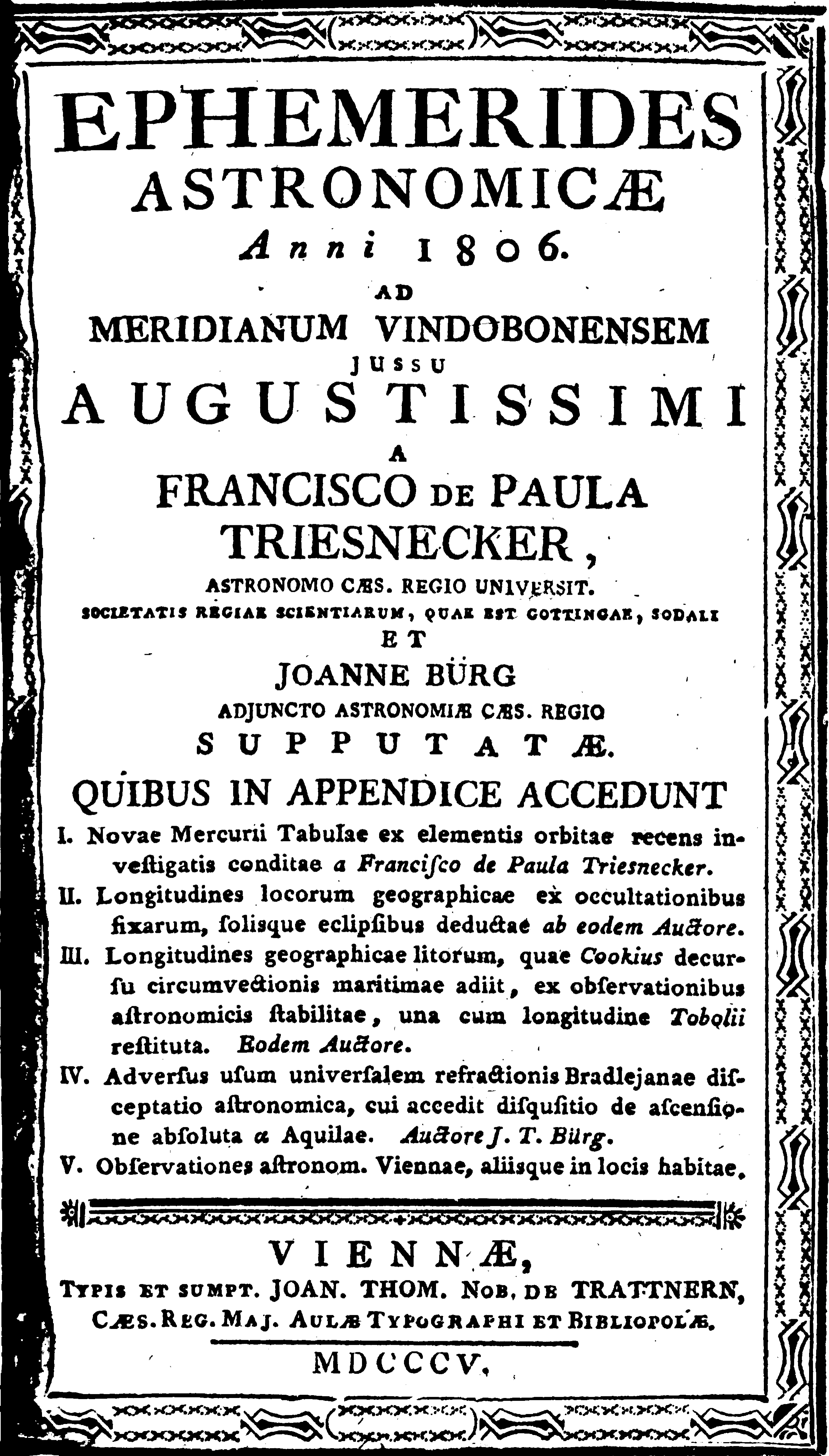
Title page of the Ephemerides Vindobonensem for 1806

Triesnecker was born in Mallon, Kirchberg am Wagram, Austria. When he was 16 he joined the Society of Jesus. He studied philosophy in Vienna and mathematics at Tyrnau, then became a teacher. Following the suppression of the Jesuits in 1773, he moved to Graz to complete his studies in theology, and was ordained soon after his graduation. In 1782 he became assistant director of the Vienna Observatory and 1792 succeeded Maximilian Hell as director. He remained in this post for the rest of his life. In 1794 he was elected Foreign Member of the Göttingen Academy of Sciences and Humanities.

During his career he published a number of treatises on astronomy and geography. He was deputy editor of the Ephemerides Astronomicae of Vienna from 1782 until he became editor in 1792. He continued as editor, collaborating with Johann Tobias Bürg, until he retired in 1806. He made a series of measurements of celestial bodies, which were published from 1787 until 1806. These included the Tabulae Mercurii, Martis, Veneris, Solares. He also carried out a long series of determinations of longitude that were noted for their accuracy.

The crater Triesnecker on the Moon is named after him.

== Works ==
- 1787: Dissertatio Lalandi de novo Planeta latine reddita
- 1788: Tabulae Mercurii juxta Mayeri Göttingensis Elementa. Appendix 3 of Ephemerides Astronomicae Vindobonensem 1788 pp 418-455
- 1789: Tabulae Martis novae ex propriis Elementis constructae. Appendix 2 of Ephemerides Astronomicae Vindobonensem 1789 pp 289-331
- 1790: Novae Veneris Tabulae ex propriis Elementis constructae. Appendix 2 of Ephemerides Astronomicae Vindobonensem 1790 pp 325-352
- 1791: Methodus figuram telluris ex Eclipsibus Solis deducendi
- 1792: De proprio Motu Stellarum fixarum in Rectascensionem et Declinationem
- 1793: Tabulae solares novae ex observationibus deductae et ad Meridianum Parisiensem constructae. Appendix 3 of Ephemerides Astronomicae Vindobonensem 1793 pp 401-455
- 1793: Commentarium De Diminutione Obliquitatis eclipticae saeculari Commentarius. Appendix 4 of Ephemerides Astronomicae Vindobonensem 1793 pp 457-489
- 1794: Commentarium de De Massa Veneris. Appendix 3 of Ephemerides Astronomicae Vindobonensem 1794 pp 419-435
- 1795: De usu Aberrationis luminis in tectione Stellarum fixarum per Lunam
- 1796: Diameter apparens solis, lunae et planetarum cum micrometro objectivo observatus
- 1797: Differentiae Satellitum Jovis ope micrometri objectivi Dolandini observatae
- 1798: Catalogus fixarum Caillianus novis observationibus restauratus. Appendix 2 of Ephemerides Astronomicae Vindobonensem 1798 pp 298-310
- 1799: Longitudines Geographicae variorum locorum e Solis Eclipsibus et fixarum deductae. Appendix 3 of Ephemerides Astronomicae Vindobonensem 1799 pp 328-372
- 1800: Item Longitudines geographicae
- 1801: Longitudines geographicae variorum tum Europae tum Americae locorum
- 1802: Determinationes Longitudinis geographicae diversorum locorum ex Eclipsibus solis et occultationibus fixarum per lunam deductae
- 1803: Defensio valoris Tabularum suarum lunarium ex plurium pluribus in locis institutis observationibus
- 1804: Longitudines et latudines fixarum ad annum 1800 cum praecessione. Appendix 2 of Ephemerides Astronomicae Vindobonensem 1804] pp 340-376
- 1804: De Stella duplici, quae media in cauda ursae majoris. Appendix 3 of Ephemerides Astronomicae Vindobonensem 1804 pp 377-379
- 1805: Novae Martis Tabulae cum perturbationibus. Appendix 2 of Ephemerides Astronomicae Vindobonensem 1805 pp 247-291.
- 1805: Elevatio Poli Vindobonensis Liesganigiana vindicata. Appendix 3 of Ephemerides Astronomicae Vindobonensem 1805 pp 292-298.
- 1805: Elevatio Poli Vindobonensis ope Sextantis Anglicani 10 pollicum explorata. Appendix 4 of Ephemerides Astronomicae Vindobonensem 1805 pp 299-304.
- 1806: Novae Mercuri Tabulae (New tables of the planet Mercury). Appendix 1 of Ephemerides Astronomicae Vindobonensem 1806 pp 237-254.
- 1806: Longitudines locorum geographicae ex occultationibus fixarum Solisque Eclipsibus (Longitude of geographical locations determined from occultations of stars and from solar eclipses). Appendix 2 of Ephemerides Astronomicae Vindobonensem 1806 pp 255-290.
- 1806: Longitudines geographicae littorum, quae Cookius decursu circumvectionis maritimae adiit, ex observationibus astronomicis stabilitae (Longitude of coastal locations determined from the astronomical observations of Cook on his circumnavigation of the globe). Appendix 3 of Ephemerides Astronomicae Vindobonensem 1806 pp 291-318.

== See also ==
- List of Jesuit scientists
- List of Roman Catholic scientist-clerics
