= Seeliger (crater) =

Crater on the Moon

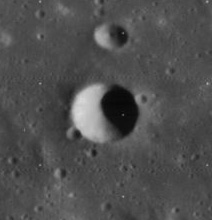
- Lunar Orbiter 4 image
- Coordinates: 2.2°S 3.0°E
- Diameter: 9 km
- Depth: 1.90 km (1.18 mi)
- Colongitude: 357° at sunrise
- Eponym: Hugo von Seeliger

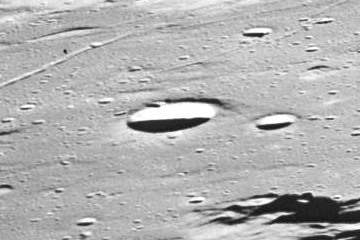
Oblique view facing west from Apollo 10

Seeliger is a relatively small lunar impact crater that lies near the southeastern edge of Sinus Medii. It was named after the German astronomer Hugo von Seeliger. This is a circular, cup-shaped feature that has not been appreciably worn by impact erosion. To the southeast is a rille named the Rima Réaumur, following a line to the northwest. In the north is the 110-km-long Rima Oppolzer, which divides the mare where Seeliger is situated from the remainder of the Sinus Medii.

== Satellite craters ==
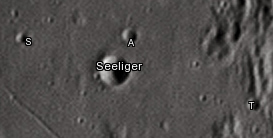
Seeliger crater and its satellite craters taken from Earth in 2012 at the University of Hertfordshire's Bayfordbury Observatory with the telescopes Meade LX200 14" and Lumenera Skynyx 2-1

By convention these features are identified on lunar maps by placing the letter on the side of the crater midpoint that is closest to Seeliger.

Seeliger	Latitude	Longitude	Diameter
A	1.8° S	3.0° E	4 km
S	2.1° S	2.1° E	4 km
T	2.2° S	4.4° E	4 km
