= Mary Adela Blagg =

English astronomer (1858–1944)

Mary Adela Blagg FRAS
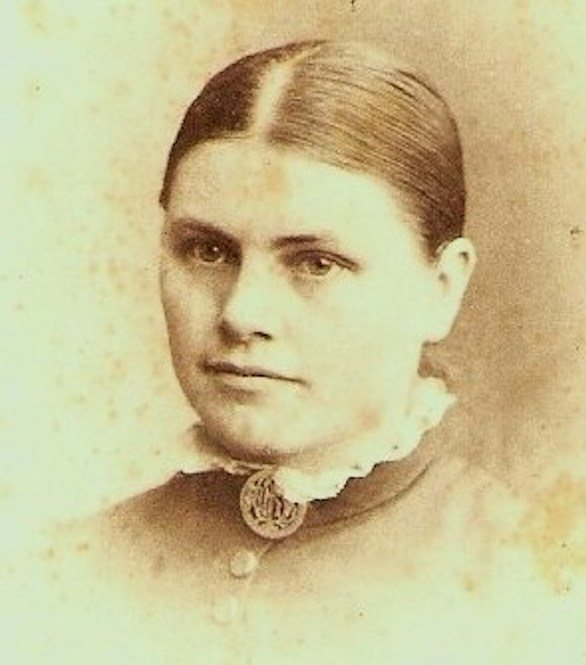
- Mary Adela Blagg as a young woman
- Born: 17 May 1858; Cheadle, Staffordshire, England
- Died: 14 April 1944 (aged 85); Cheadle, Staffordshire, England
- Occupation: Astronomer

Mary Adela Blagg FRAS FRAS (17 May 1858 – 14 April 1944) was an English astronomer. Largely self-taught in mathematics, she came to astronomy in middle age and became known for her work on selenography and variable stars. In 1916 she was among the first women to be elected a fellow of the Royal Astronomical Society.

Blagg's principal contribution was to the standardisation of lunar nomenclature, which at the time varied considerably between the major maps of the Moon. Appointed in 1907 to a committee of the International Association of Academies, she collated the inconsistent names earlier selenographers had given to lunar features, publishing her Collated List of Lunar Formations in 1913. After joining the Lunar Commission of the newly founded International Astronomical Union in 1920, she worked with the amateur astronomer Karl Müller to produce Named Lunar Formations (1935), a two-volume set that became the standard reference on the subject.

She also carried out extensive analysis of variable star observations in collaboration with H. H. Turner, co-authoring ten papers in the Monthly Notices of the Royal Astronomical Society for which Turner credited her with the majority of the work. The lunar crater Blagg was named in her honour after her death.

== Early life and education ==
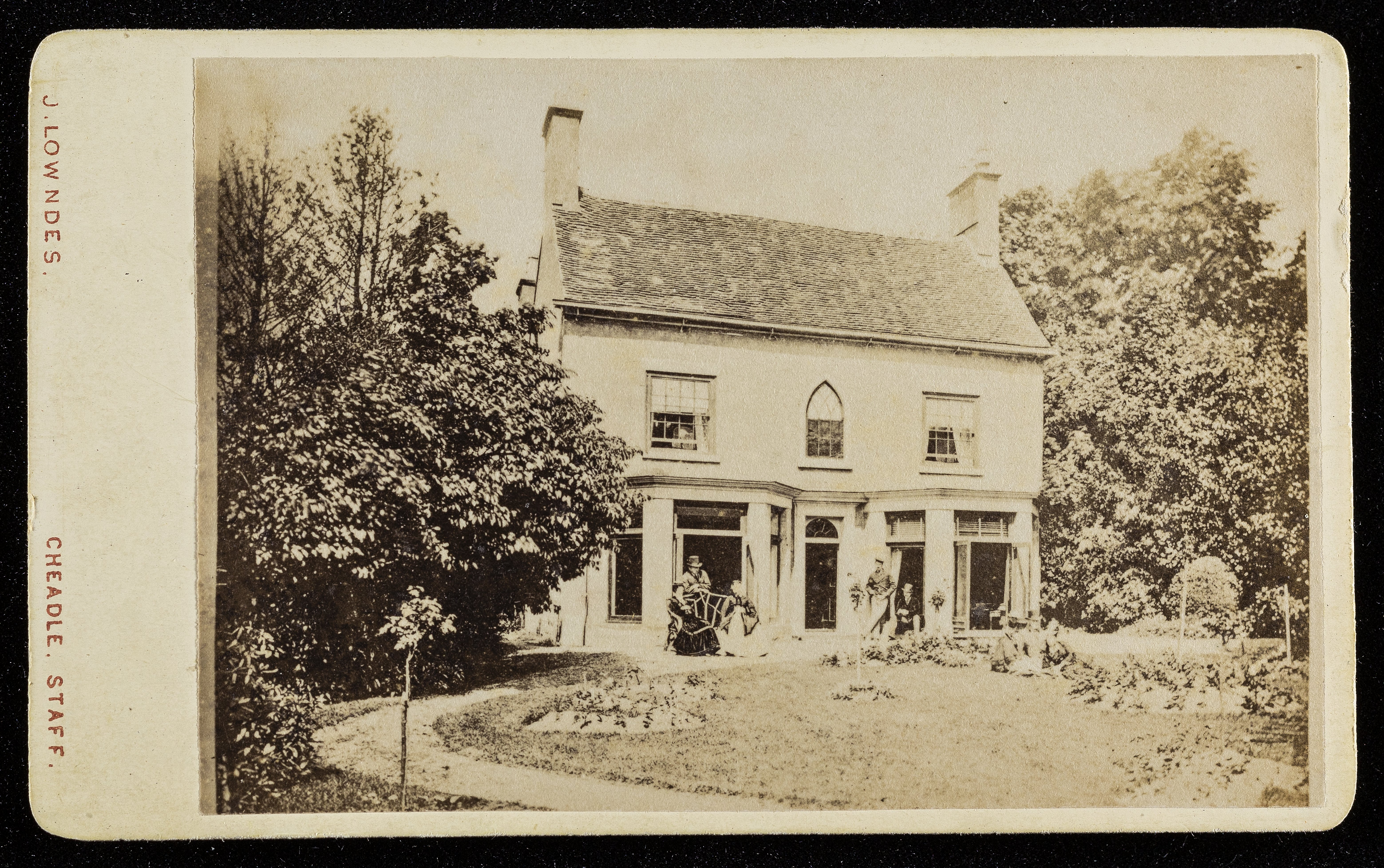
Blagg was born here

Blagg was born in Cheadle, Staffordshire on 17 May 1858. She was the eldest of nine children born to Frances Caroline (born Foottit) and John Charles Blagg. Her father was a solicitor. She trained herself in mathematics by reading her brother's textbooks. In 1875, she was sent to a finishing school in Kensington, where she studied algebra and German. She later worked as a Sunday school teacher and was the branch secretary of the Girls' Friendly Society.

== Scientific career ==
By middle age, Blagg became interested in astronomy after attending a university extension course taught by Joseph Hardcastle, John Herschel's grandson. Her tutor suggested working in the area of selenography, particularly on the problem of developing a uniform system of lunar nomenclature. (Several major lunar maps of the period had discrepancies in terms of naming the various features.)

In 1907, Blagg was appointed by the newly formed International Association of Academies to build a collated list of all of the lunar features. She worked with Samuel Saunder on the task, and the result was published in 1913. Her work produced a long list of discrepancies that the association would need to resolve. She also performed considerable work on the subject of variable stars, in collaboration with H. H. Turner. These were published in a series of ten articles in the Monthly Notices, in which Turner acknowledged that a large majority of the work had been performed by Blagg. On 28 March 1906, Blagg was elected to the British Astronomical Association at the proposal of Hardcastle.

After the publication of several research papers for the Royal Astronomical Society, she was elected as a fellow in January 1916, after being nominated by Professor Turner. She was one of five women to be elected simultaneously, the first women to become Fellows of that society.

She worked out a Fourier analysis of Bode's Law in 1913, which was detailed in Michael Martin Nieto's book "The Titius-Bode Law of Planetary Distances." Her investigation corrected a major flaw in the original law and gave it a firmer physical footing. However, her paper was forgotten until 1953, when it was found that her predictions had been validated by discoveries of new planetary satellites unknown at the time of publication.

In 1920, she joined the Lunar Commission of the newly formed International Astronomical Union. They tasked her with continuing her work on standardizing the nomenclature. For this task, she collaborated with Karl Müller (1866–1942), a retired government official and amateur astronomer. (The crater Müller on the Moon was subsequently named after him.) Together, they produced a two-volume set in 1935, titled Named Lunar Formations, that became the standard reference on the subject.

== Personal life ==
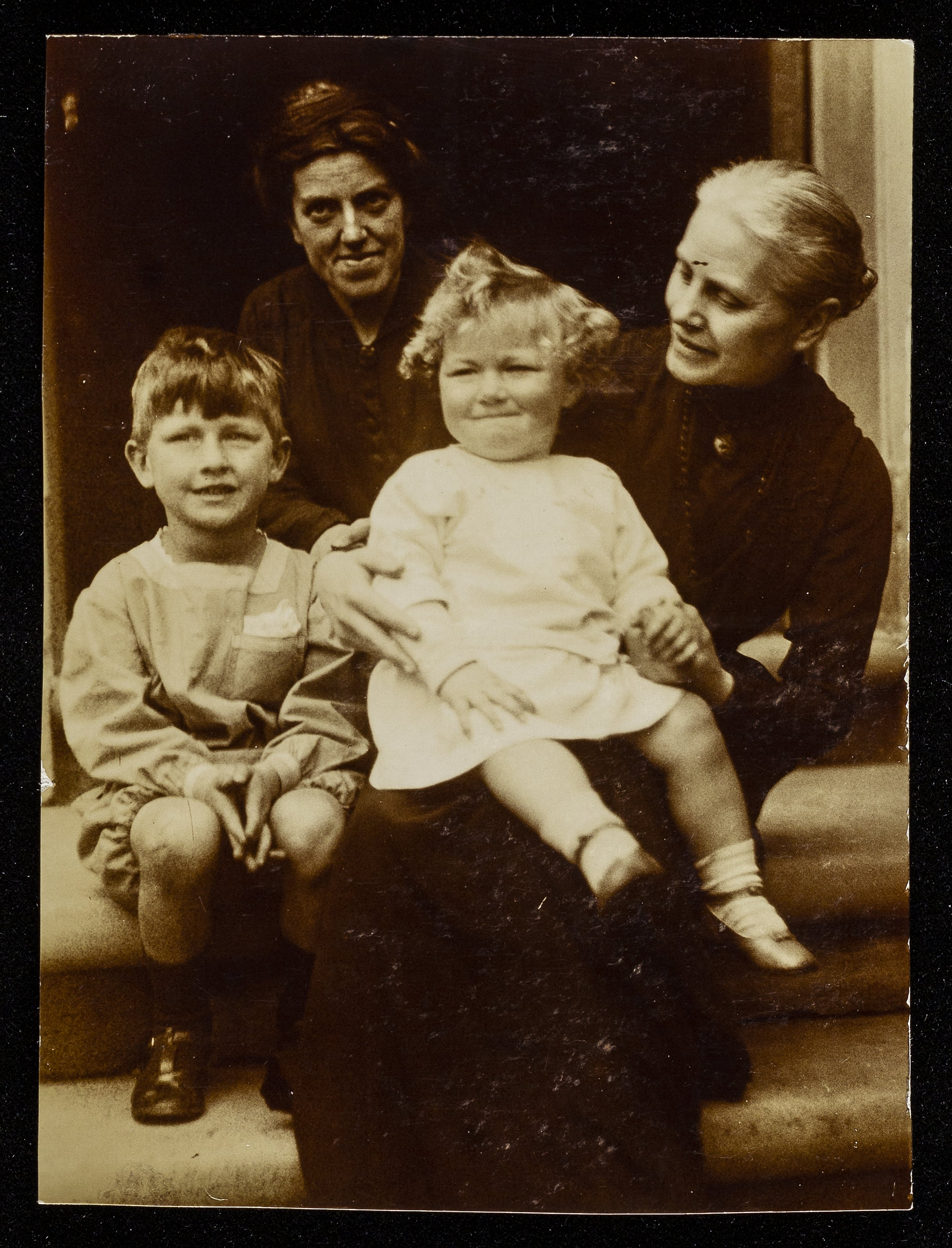
Mary and Dorothea Blagg with Belgian children

During her life, Blagg performed volunteer work, including caring for Belgian refugee children during World War I. One of her favorite hobbies was chess. She was described in her obituary as being of "modest and retiring disposition, in fact very much of a recluse", and rarely attended meetings.

She died from heart disease on 14 April 1944 at her home in Cheadle.

== Honours ==
The crater Blagg on the Moon is named after her. In March 2023, minor planet 2000 EO_{177} was also named 50753 Maryblagg in her honour.

== Bibliography ==
- M. A. Blagg, Collated List of Lunar Formations, Edinburgh, 1913.
- M. A. Blagg and Karl Müller, Named Lunar Formations, London, 1935 — vol. 1, catalogue; vol. 2, maps.
- Blagg, Mary (February 1909). "Visibility of the phase of Venus and of the Pleiades". Journal of the British Astronomical Association. 19 (5): 218–219. Bibcode:1909JBAA...19..216.
- Blagg, Mary (April 1913). "A Suggested Substitute for Bode's Law". Monthly Notices of the Royal Astronomical Society. 73: 414–422. Bibcode:1913MNRAS..73..414B. doi:10.1093/mnras/73.6.414.
- Blagg, Mary (October 1913). "The Shortest Lunar Day". Journal of the British Astronomical Association. 24 (1): 45–46. Bibcode:1913JBAA...24...44.
- Blagg, Mary; Turner, H H (March 1914). "Baxendell's Observations of Variable Stars". Monthly Notices of the Royal Astronomical Society. 74: 451–482. Bibcode:1914MNRAS..74..451T. doi:10.1093/mnras/74.5.451.
- Blagg, Mary; Turner, H H (May 1914). "Baxendell's Observations of Variable Stars. Third Instalment". Monthly Notices of the Royal Astronomical Society. 74: 568–599. Bibcode:1914MNRAS..74..568T. doi:10.1093/mnras/74.7.568.
- Blagg, Mary; Turner, H H (March 1915). "Baxendell's Observations of Variable Stars. Fourth Instalment". Monthly Notices of the Royal Astronomical Society. 75: 398–425. Bibcode:1915MNRAS..75..398T. doi:10.1093/mnras/75.5.398a.
- Blagg, Mary (December 1915). "Baxendell's Observations of Variable Stars. Fifth Instalment". Monthly Notices of the Royal Astronomical Society. 76: 158–190. Bibcode:1915MNRAS..76..158.. doi:10.1093/mnras/76.2.158.
- Blagg, Mary; Turner, H H; Baxendell, J (December 1916). "Baxendell's Observations of Variable Stars. Eighth instalment". Monthly Notices of the Royal Astronomical Society. 77: 125–140. Bibcode:1916MNRAS..77..125B. doi:10.1093/mnras/77.2.125.
- Blagg, Mary; Turner, H H; Baxendell, J (May 1917). "Baxendell's Observations of Variable Stars. Ninth Instalment". Monthly Notices of the Royal Astronomical Society. 77: 555–578. Bibcode:1917MNRAS..77..555B. doi:10.1093/mnras/77.7.555.
- Blagg, Mary; Turner, H H (May 1918). "Baxendell's Observations of Variable Stars. Tenth Instalment". Monthly Notices of the Royal Astronomical Society. 78: 491–541. Bibcode:1918MNRAS..78..491T. doi:10.1093/mnras/78.7.491.
- Blagg, Mary; Turner, H H (November 1919). "The Long-period Variable W Cygni". Monthly Notices of the Royal Astronomical Society. 80: 41–64. Bibcode:1919MNRAS..80...41T. doi:10.1093/mnras/80.1.41.
- Blagg, Mary; Turner, H H (December 1920). "Second Note on the Long-period Variable W Cygni". Monthly Notices of the Royal Astronomical Society. 81: 144–150. Bibcode:1920MNRAS..81..144T. doi:10.1093/mnras/81.2.144.
- Blagg, Mary (June 1924). "Baxendell's Observations of β Lyræ". Monthly Notices of the Royal Astronomical Society. 84 (8): 629–659. Bibcode:1924MNRAS..84..629B. doi:10.1093/mnras/84.8.629.
- Blagg, Mary (March 1925). "Observations of β Lyræ by members of the B.A.A., 1906-1920". Monthly Notices of the Royal Astronomical Society. 85: 484–496. Bibcode:1925MNRAS..85..484B. doi:10.1093/mnras/85.5.484.
- Blagg, Mary (January 1928). "Discussion of some further Observations of β Lyræ". Monthly Notices of the Royal Astronomical Society. 88: 162–173. Bibcode:1928MNRAS..88..162B. doi:10.1093/mnras/88.3.162.
- Blagg, Mary (June 1929). "Discussion of Observations of Three Long-period Variables, No.1". Monthly Notices of the Royal Astronomical Society. 89: 687–697. Bibcode:1929MNRAS..89..687B. doi:10.1093/mnras/89.8.687.
- Blagg, Mary (June 1929). "Beer and Mädler's Heights". Journal of the British Astronomical Association. 39 (8): 328–329. Bibcode:1929JBAA...39..326.
- Blagg, Mary (March 1930). "Discussion of Observations of Three Long-period Variables, No. 2". Monthly Notices of the Royal Astronomical Society. 90: 552–560. Bibcode:1930MNRAS..90..552B. doi:10.1093/mnras/90.5.552.
- Blagg, Mary (December 1930). "Discussion of Observations of Three Long-period Variables, No. 3". Monthly Notices of the Royal Astronomical Society. 91: 231–237. Bibcode:1930MNRAS..91..231B. doi:10.1093/mnras/91.2.231.
