= Friedrich August Ukert =

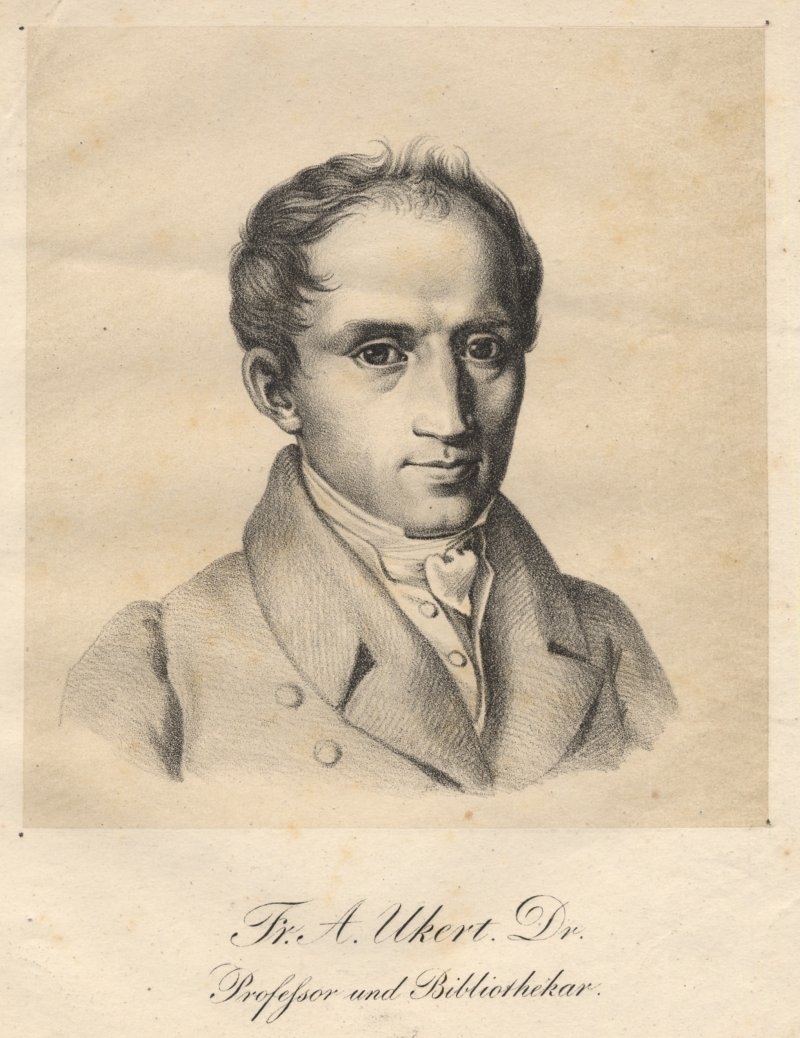
Friedrich August Ukert

Friedrich August Ukert (28 October 1780 – 18 May 1851) was a German history scholar, teacher and humanitarian. He was born in Eutin, Bishopric of Lübeck.

From 1800 he studied philology at the University of Halle as a student of Friedrich August Wolf, then continued his education at the University of Jena, where his instructors included Johann Heinrich Voss, Johann Jakob Griesbach and Christian Gottfried Schütz. After finishing his studies, he worked as a tutor, first in Danzig, then in Weimar, where he provided education for the two sons of the late Friedrich Schiller. In 1808 he relocated to Gotha and worked as an inspector at the Gymnasium Illustre. Shortly afterwards, he found employment as a librarian at the city's ducal library. At the time of his death, he held the title of chief librarian in Gotha.

He helped Arnold Heeren to found the historical collection, Geschichte der Europäischen Staaten (History of the States of Europe).

The crater Ukert on the Moon is named after him.

== Bibliography ==
- F. A. Ukert, Über die Art der Griechen die Entfernungen zu bestimmen (How the Greeks determined Distances), 1813.
- F. A. Ukert, Bemerkungen über Homer's Geographie (On Homer's Geography), 1815.
- F. Beaufort and F. A. Ukert, Reise durch Klein-Asien, Armenien und Kurdistan (Journey to Asia Minor, Armenia and Kurdistan), Weimar, 1821.
- F. A. Ukert, Geographie der Griechen und Römer von den frühesten Zeiten bis auf Ptolemäus, (Geography of the Greeks and Romans from the earliest times up to the time of Ptolemy), Weimar, 1816–1846, 3 volumes).
- F. A. Ukert and Friedrich Jacobs, Beiträge zur ältern Literatur oder Merkwürdigkeiten der herzöglichen Bibliothek zu Gotha (Contributions to the older literature at the ducal library of Gotha), Leipzig, 1835–38.
- F. A. Ukert, Über Dämonen, Heroen und Genien (Demons, Heroes, and Genii), Leipzig, 1850.
