= 998 Bodea =

Dark background asteroid

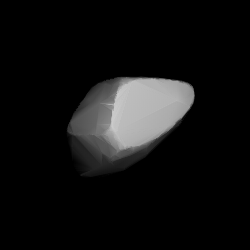
- Modelled shape of Bodea from its lightcurve

Discovery
- Discovered by: K. Reinmuth
- Discovery site: Heidelberg Obs.
- Discovery date: 6 August 1923

Designations
- Pronunciation: /ˈboʊdiə/
- Named after: Johann Elert Bode (German astronomer)
- Alternative designations: A923 PC · 1967 PA; 1923 NU
- Minor planet category: main-belt · (outer); background

Orbital characteristics
- Epoch 27 April 2019 (JD 2458600.5)
- Uncertainty parameter 0
- Observation arc: 96.34 yr (35,187 d)
- Aphelion: 3.7826 AU
- Perihelion: 2.4547 AU
- Semi-major axis: 3.1187 AU
- Eccentricity: 0.2129
- Orbital period (sidereal): 5.51 yr (2,012 d)
- Mean anomaly: 89.259°
- Mean motion: 0° 10^{m} 44.4^{s} / day
- Inclination: 15.505°
- Longitude of ascending node: 301.18°
- Argument of perihelion: 72.139°

Physical characteristics
- Mean diameter: 31.21±0.39 km; 31.761±0.497 km; 38.16±3.1 km
- Synodic rotation period: 8.574 h (Note: Lightcurve plot (998) Bodea, by Roberto Crippa and Federico Manzini at the Sozzago Astronomical Station (A12). The obtained rotation period was 8.574 hours (0.357 days). Summary figures at Raoul Behrend – Geneva Observatory.)
- Pole ecliptic latitude: (7.0°, −59.0°) (λ/β)
- Geometric albedo: 0.0211±0.004; 0.030±0.001; 0.033±0.001
- Spectral type: C (assumed)
- Absolute magnitude (H): 11.5

998 Bodea (prov. designation: A923 PC or 1923 NU) is a dark background asteroid from the outer regions of the asteroid belt, approximately 32 kilometers (20 miles) in diameter. It was discovered on 6 August 1923, by astronomer Karl Reinmuth at the Heidelberg Observatory in southern Germany. The presumed C-type asteroid with an irregular shape has a rotation period of 8.6 hours. It was named after German astronomer Johann Elert Bode (1747–1826).

== Orbit and classification ==
Bodea is a non-family asteroid of the main belt's background population when applying the hierarchical clustering method to its proper orbital elements. It orbits the Sun in the outer asteroid belt at a distance of 2.5–3.8 AU once every 5 years and 6 months (2,012 days; semi-major axis of 3.12 AU). Its orbit has an eccentricity of 0.21 and an inclination of 16° with respect to the ecliptic. The body's observation arc begins at Heidelberg on 8 August 1923, just two days after its official discovery observation.

== Naming ==
This minor planet was named after Johann Elert Bode (1747–1826), German astronomer, author of the Berliner Astronomisches Jahrbuch, known for the empirical Titius–Bode law about the sequence of planetary distances. Bode also was the director of the Berlin Observatory in 1780. The asteroid's name was proposed by Swedish astronomer Bror Asplind (see citation for 958 Asplinda). The official naming citation was mentioned in The Names of the Minor Planets by Paul Herget in 1955 (H 95). The lunar crater Bode is also named in his honor.

== Physical characteristics ==
Bodea is an assumed C-type asteroid. Due to its very low albedo of 0.03 or less, it could also be a P- or D-type asteroid which are very common in the outer asteroid belt and among the Jupiter trojan population.

=== Rotation period ===
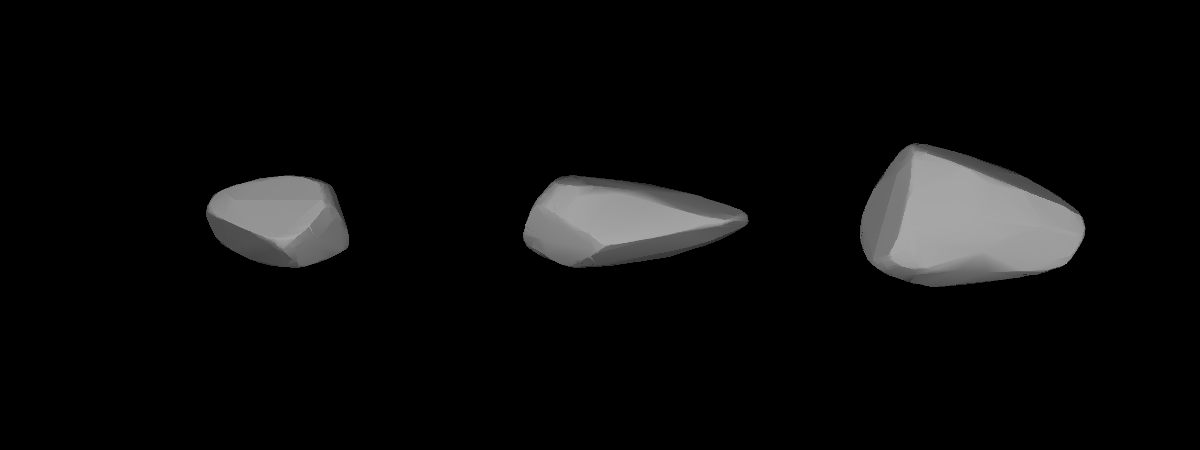
Lightcurve-based 3D-model of Bodea

In September 2006, a rotational lightcurve of Bodea was obtained from photometric observations by Italian astronomers Roberto Crippa and Federico Manzini at the Sozzago Astronomical Station (A12). Lightcurve analysis gave a well defined rotation period of 8.574±0.001 hours with a relatively high brightness amplitude of 0.68±0.01 magnitude (U=3), which is indicative of an elongated, irregular shape.

=== Poles ===
Modeled photometric data from the Lowell Photometric Database (LPD) and WISE thermal data, gave a concurring sidereal rotation period of 8.57412 hours. Each modeled lightcurve also determined the object's spin axes. Durech gives only one pole, namely (7.0°, −59.0°), while Hanus determined two lower rated poles at (336.0°, −70.0°) and (72.0°, −56.0°) in ecliptic coordinates (λ, β).

=== Diameter and albedo ===
According to the survey carried out by the NEOWISE mission of NASA's WISE telescope, Bodea measures 31.761±0.497 kilometers in diameter and its surface has an albedo of 0.030±0.001. Results from the Japanese Akari satellite are in agreement with 31.21±0.39 km and an albedo of 0.030±0.001. Only the Infrared Astronomical Satellite IRAS gave a larger diameter of 38.16±3.1 km and, correspondingly, a lower albedo of 0.0211±0.004. The Collaborative Asteroid Lightcurve Link adopts an albedo of 0.0304 and derives a diameter of 38.23 kilometers based on an absolute magnitude of 11.5.
