= Rhaeticus (crater) =

Crater on the Moon

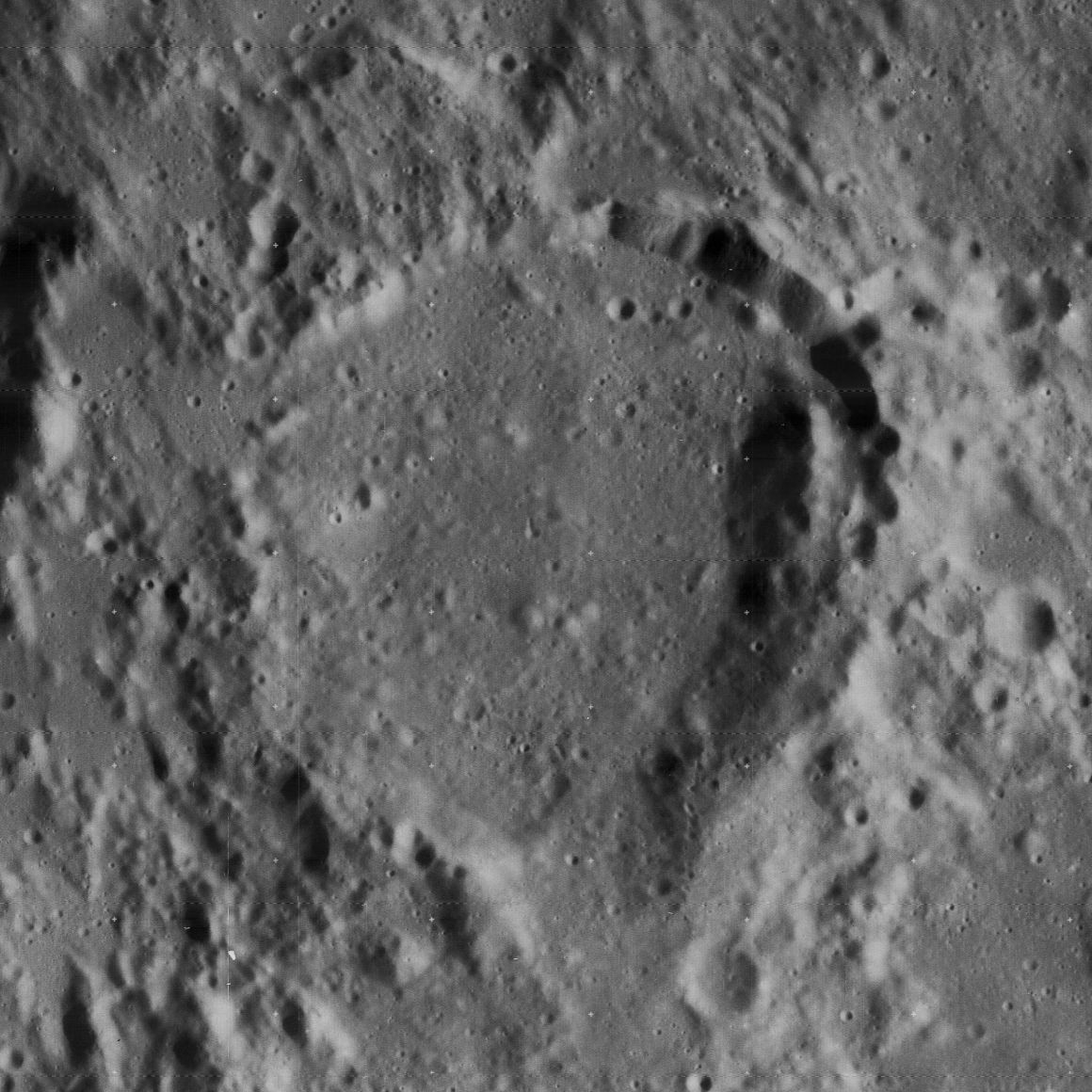
- Lunar Orbiter 4 image
- Coordinates: 0.0°N 4.9°E
- Diameter: 43 × 49 km
- Depth: 1.2 km
- Colongitude: 254° at sunrise
- Eponym: Georg Joachim Rheticus

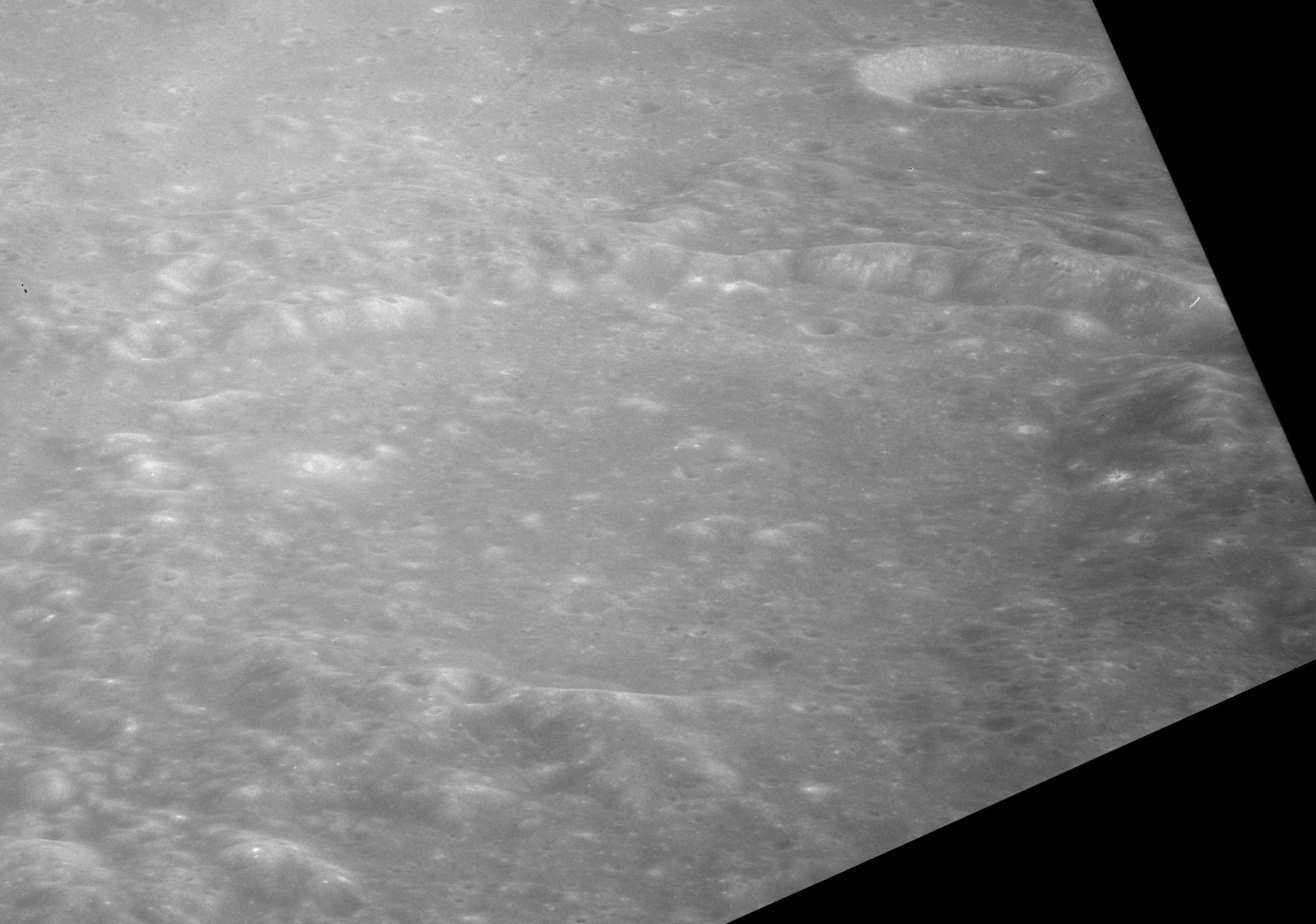
Oblique view of Rhaeticus facing north, and showing Rhaeticus A crater in upper right. From Apollo 12

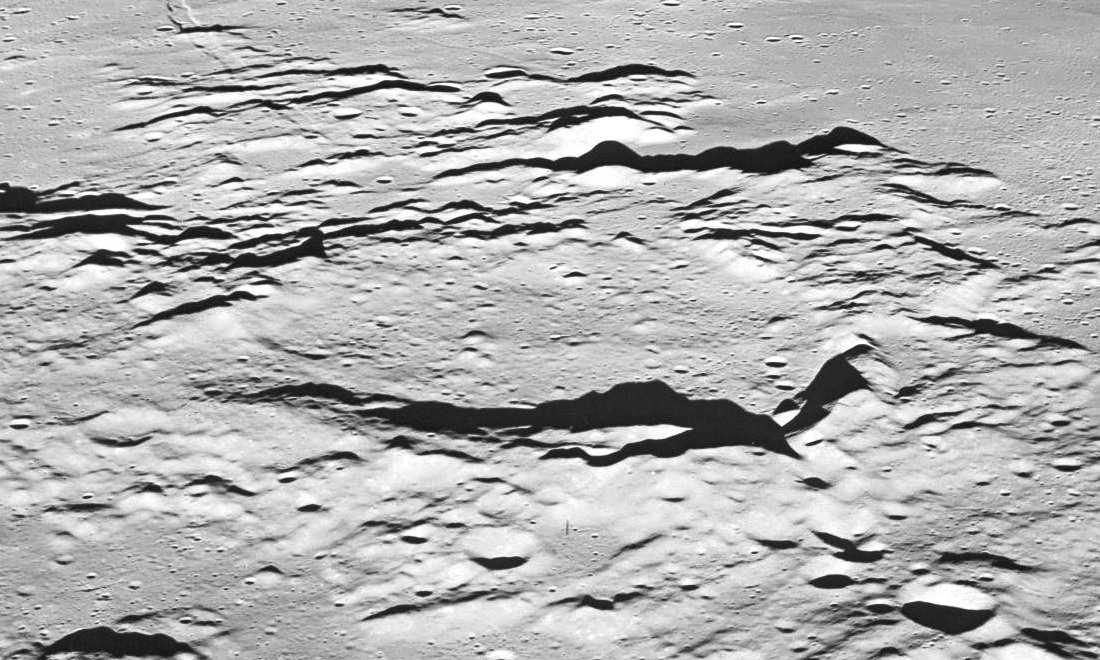
Oblique view of Rhaeticus facing west at low sun angle. From Apollo 10

Rhaeticus is a lunar impact crater that lies astride the equator of the Moon, on the southeast edge of the Sinus Medii. To the north-northwest is the crater Triesnecker, and due south can be found the worn remnant of the walled plain named Hipparchus. The crater was named after Austrian astronomer Georg Joachim Rheticus.

== Description ==
The outer wall of Rhaeticus is heavily disintegrated, with rifts and notches in the northeast. The wall is most intact along the eastern face, while in the northwest it is little more than a low rise in the surface. There is also a low cut in the south-southeast wall. The overall shape of the rim is that of a rough hexagon that is slightly elongated in the north–south direction. The interior has been resurfaced by lava, and only a few low rises remain in the surface. Beginning at the crest of the eastern wall is a chain of craterlets that continue to the east-northeast for about a crater diameter.

Running southwest from Rhaeticus to the crater Réaumur is a long rille, which is difficult to make out near Rhaeticus because of the group of mountains at that crater's southwest. The crater itself is 43 kilometers wide at one diameter and 49 kilometers long at another. It is from the Pre-Imbrian period, which lasted from 4.55 to 3.85 billion years ago.

== Bright satellite crater Rhaeticus B during full moon ==
Although Rhaeticus itself is unrecognizable during full moon, its location could be found with help from the very bright white looking satellite crater Rhaeticus B northeast of it and west of Godin. The bright and almost starlike appearance of Rhaeticus B is also noticeable on the photographic version of chart LAC 59 (page 118) in The Clementine Atlas of the Moon (Ben Bussey / Paul D. Spudis).

== Dark formation Rhaeticus L during full moon ==
Immediately westnorthwest of Rhaeticus, a dark formation in the shape of a lightning stroke pictogram is discernible during full moon. This formation received the officially recognized identification Rhaeticus L.

== Satellite craters ==
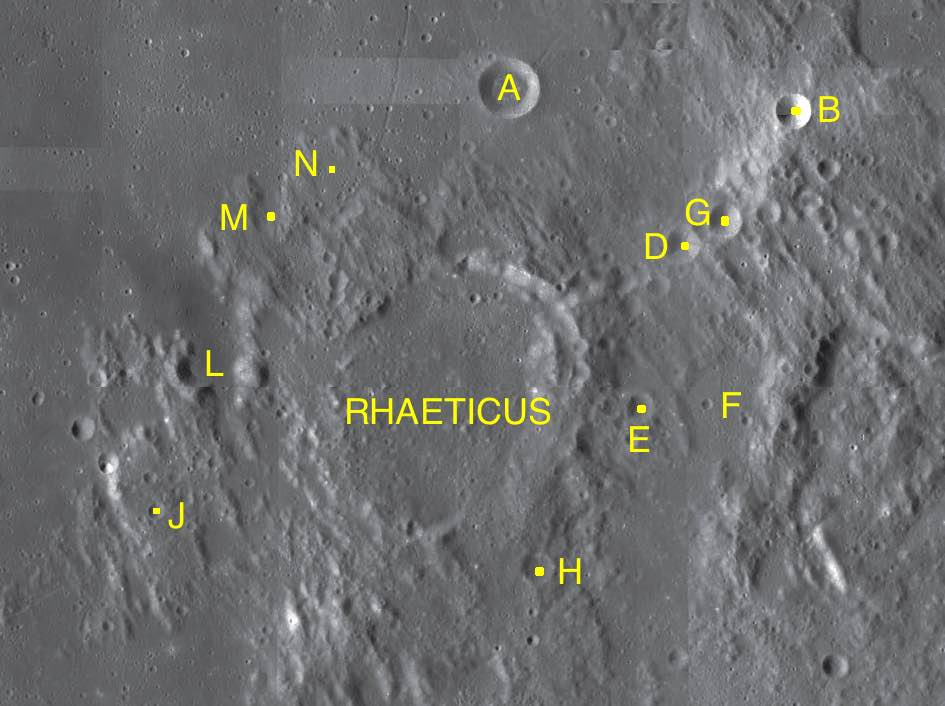
Rhaeticus and its satellite craters map

By convention, these features are identified on lunar maps by placing the letter on the side of the crater midpoint that is closest to Rhaeticus.

Rhaeticus	Latitude	Longitude	Diameter
A	1.8° N	5.2° E	11 km
B	1.7° N	6.8° E	6 km
D	0.9° N	6.2° E	7 km
E	0.1° S	6.0° E	5 km
F	0.1° S	6.5° E	18 km
G	1.0° N	6.4° E	6 km
H	1.0° S	5.4° E	6 km
J	0.7° S	3.2° E	4 km
L	0.2° N	3.6° E	14 km
M	1.0° N	3.8° E	7 km
N	1.2° N	4.2° E	12 km

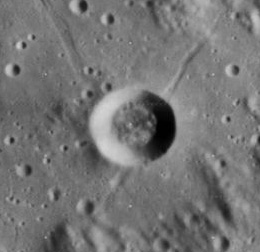
Lunar Orbiter 4 image of Rhaeticus A
