= Pallas (crater) =

Crater on the Moon

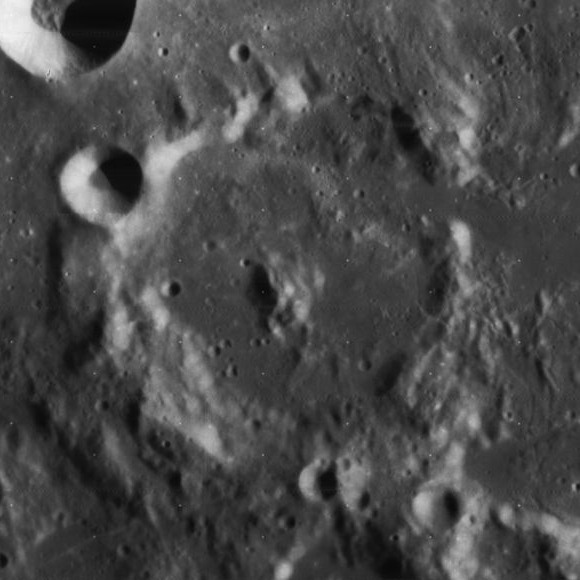
- Lunar Orbiter 4 image
- Coordinates: 5.5°N 1.6°W
- Diameter: 50 km
- Depth: 1.5 km
- Colongitude: 2° at sunrise
- Eponym: Peter Simon Pallas

Pallas is a heavily eroded lunar impact crater located to the north of the Sinus Medii. It was named after the German-born Russian natural historian Peter Simon Pallas. To the northwest is the smaller but less worn crater Bode. Pallas shares a low wall with the crater Murchison that is attached to the southeast, and there are two gaps in the shared rim.

The outer wall of Pallas is worn, notched, and somewhat distorted in shape. The associated crater Pallas A lies across the northwest rim. The inner floor of Pallas has been flooded by lava, leaving a relatively flat surface. The crater possesses a central peak complex.

== Lunar flare ==
On November 15, 1953, the physician and amateur astronomer Dr. Leon H. Stuart took a picture of the Moon that appeared to show a flare of light about 16 km southeast of Pallas. The flare was estimated to last for about 8–10 seconds. The report was published in a 1956 issue of The Strolling Astronomer, a newsletter. However the incident was dismissed by professionals of the period as more likely a meteoroid entering the Earth's atmosphere.

Many years later Dr. Bonnie Buratti of JPL saw the photograph and decided to investigate. Assisted by a graduate student, she identified a 1.5 km. diameter crater imaged by the Clementine spacecraft. The crater has the correct size, shape, and albedo to match the expected impact energy. Some astronomers now agree that Dr. Stuart may indeed have photographed an asteroid impact on the Moon.

== Satellite craters ==
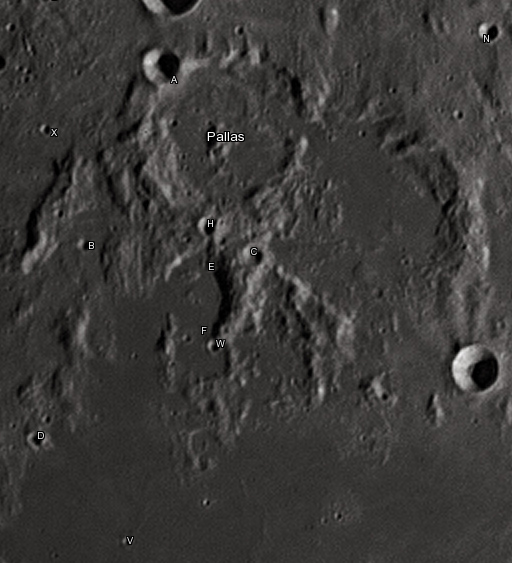
Pallas crater and its satellite craters taken from Earth in 2012 at the University of Hertfordshire's Bayfordbury Observatory with the telescopes Meade LX200 14" and Lumenera Skynyx 2-1

By convention these features are identified on lunar maps by placing the letter on the side of the crater midpoint that is closest to Pallas.

Pallas	Latitude	Longitude	Diameter
A	6.0° N	2.3° W	11 km
B	4.2° N	2.6° W	4 km
C	4.5° N	1.1° W	6 km
D	2.4° N	2.6° W	4 km
E	4.0° N	1.4° W	26 km
F	3.4° N	1.3° W	18 km
H	4.6° N	1.5° W	5 km
N	7.0° N	0.5° E	6 km
V	1.7° N	1.5° W	3 km
W	3.6° N	1.3° W	3 km
X	5.2° N	3.2° W	3 km
