= Murchison (crater) =

Crater on the Moon

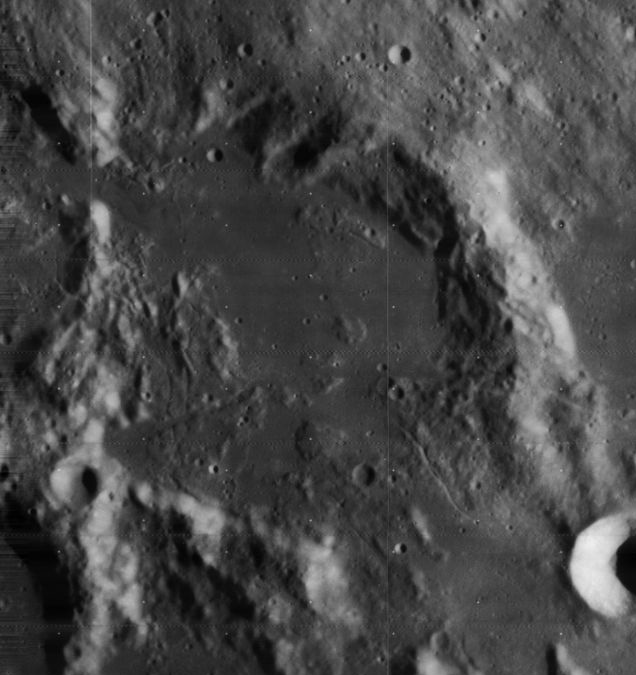
- Lunar Orbiter 4 image
- Coordinates: 5.1°N 0.1°W
- Diameter: 58 km
- Depth: 1.8 km
- Colongitude: 0° at sunrise
- Eponym: Roderick I. Murchison

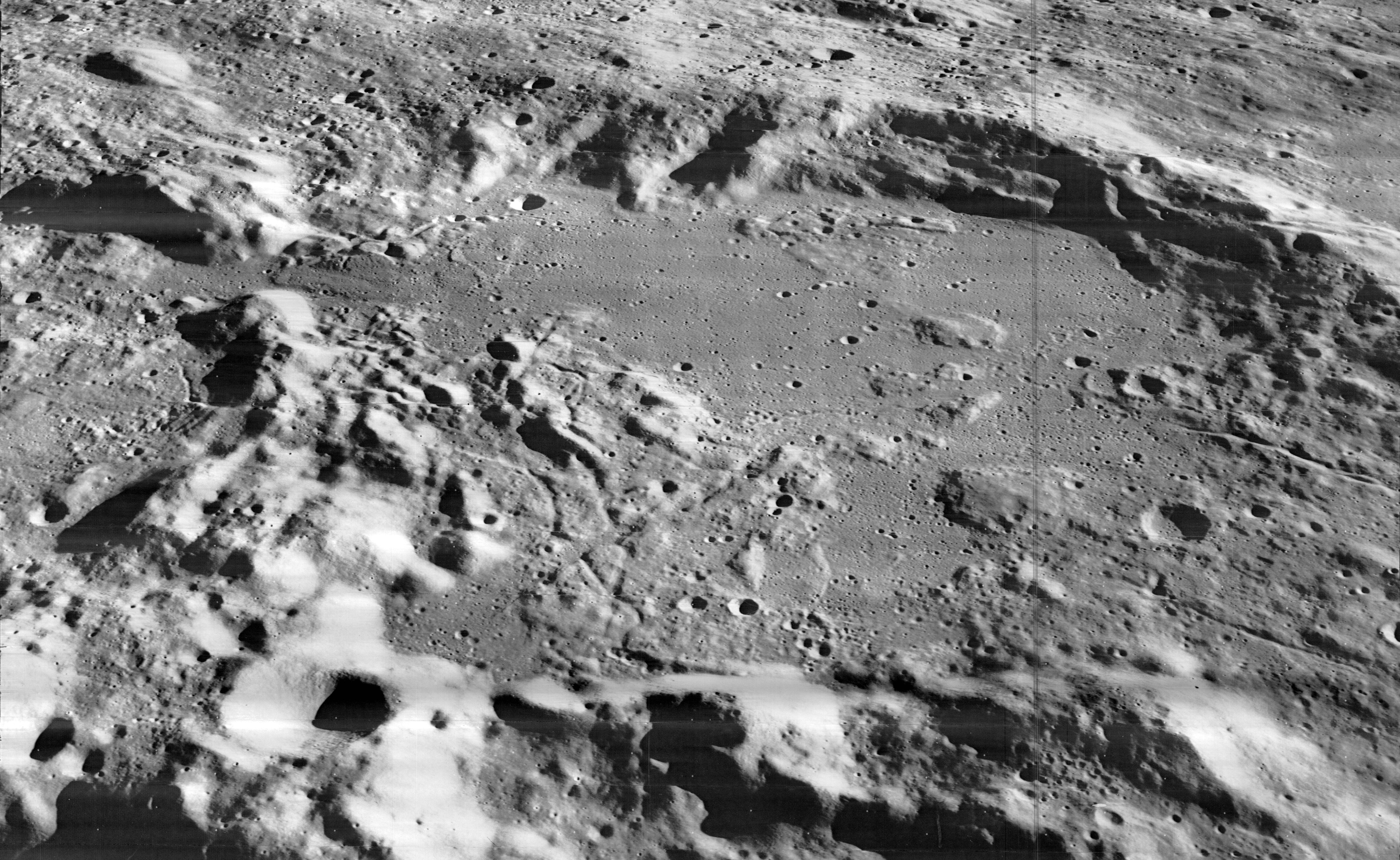
Oblique view from Lunar Orbiter 3

Murchison is a lunar impact crater on the north edge of the Sinus Medii. It was named in honour of the geologist Sir Roderick Murchison. It shares a section of rim with the crater Pallas. To the southeast on the mare is the circular crater Chladni, and to the northeast is Ukert. Farther to the east is the prominent Triesnecker. Murchison lies astride the lunar zenith line, i.e. the starting longitude of the selenographic coordinate system.

The wall of Murchison is heavily worn and has completely disappeared in a wide gap to the southeast. The rim is most intact along the northeast part of the crater, but even there it is indented and irregular. Only a ridge remains of the rim shared by Pallas and Murchison, with gaps to the north and south. A low ridge from the east wall runs south to join the rim of Chladni. The crater floor has been flooded with lava and joins the Sinus Medii through the wide gap in the southeast wall.

== Satellite craters ==
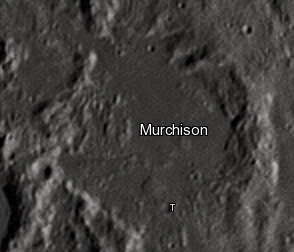
Murchison crater and its satellite craters taken from Earth in 2012 at the University of Hertfordshire's Bayfordbury Observatory with the telescopes Meade LX200 14" and Lumenera Skynyx 2-1

By convention, these features are identified on lunar maps by placing the letter on the side of the crater midpoint that is closest to Murchison.

Murchison	Latitude	Longitude	Diameter
T	4.4° N	0.1° E	3 km
