= Sinus Medii =

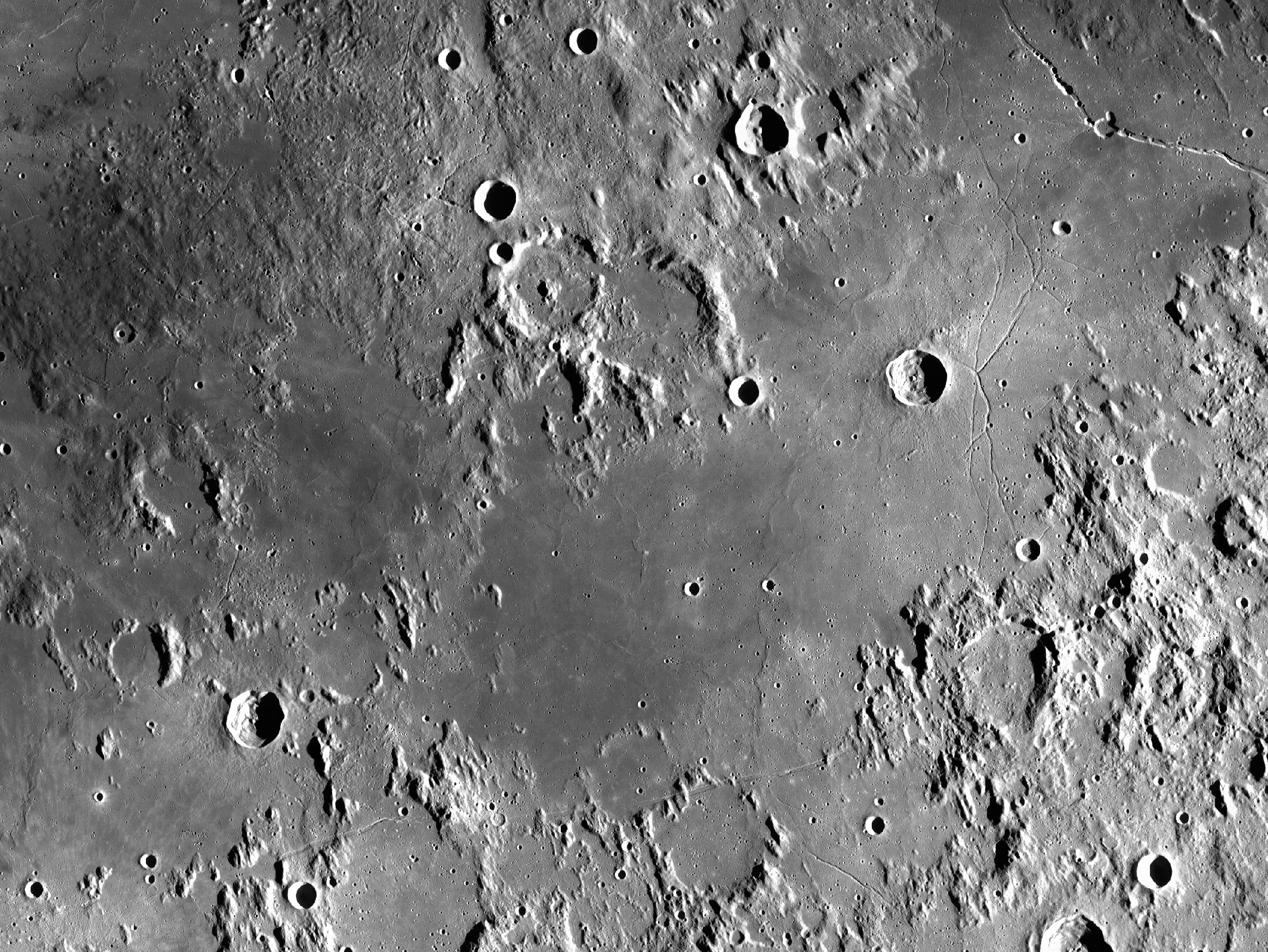
- LRO image
- Coordinates: 1.6°N 1.0°E
- Diameter: 287 km (178 mi)
- Eponym: Bay of the Center

Sinus Medii /ˈsaɪnəs ˈmiːdiaɪ/ (Latin sinus mediī "Middle Bay") is a small lunar mare. It takes its name from its location at the intersection of the Moon's equator and prime meridian. As seen from the Earth, this feature is located in the central part of the Moon's near side, and it is the point closest to the Earth. From this spot, the Earth would always appear directly overhead, although the planet's position would vary slightly due to libration.

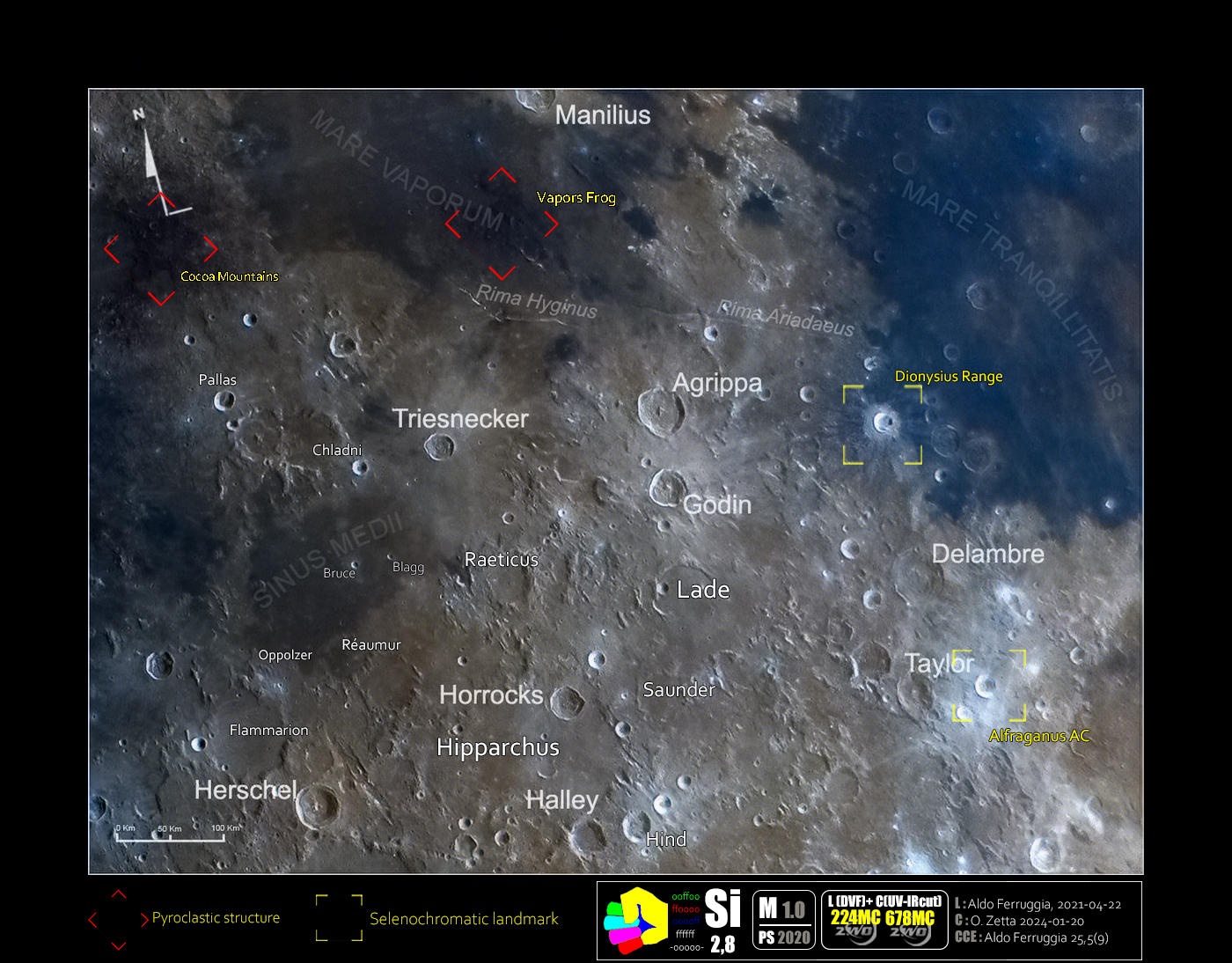
Sinus Medii and closer craters with mineral postprocessing

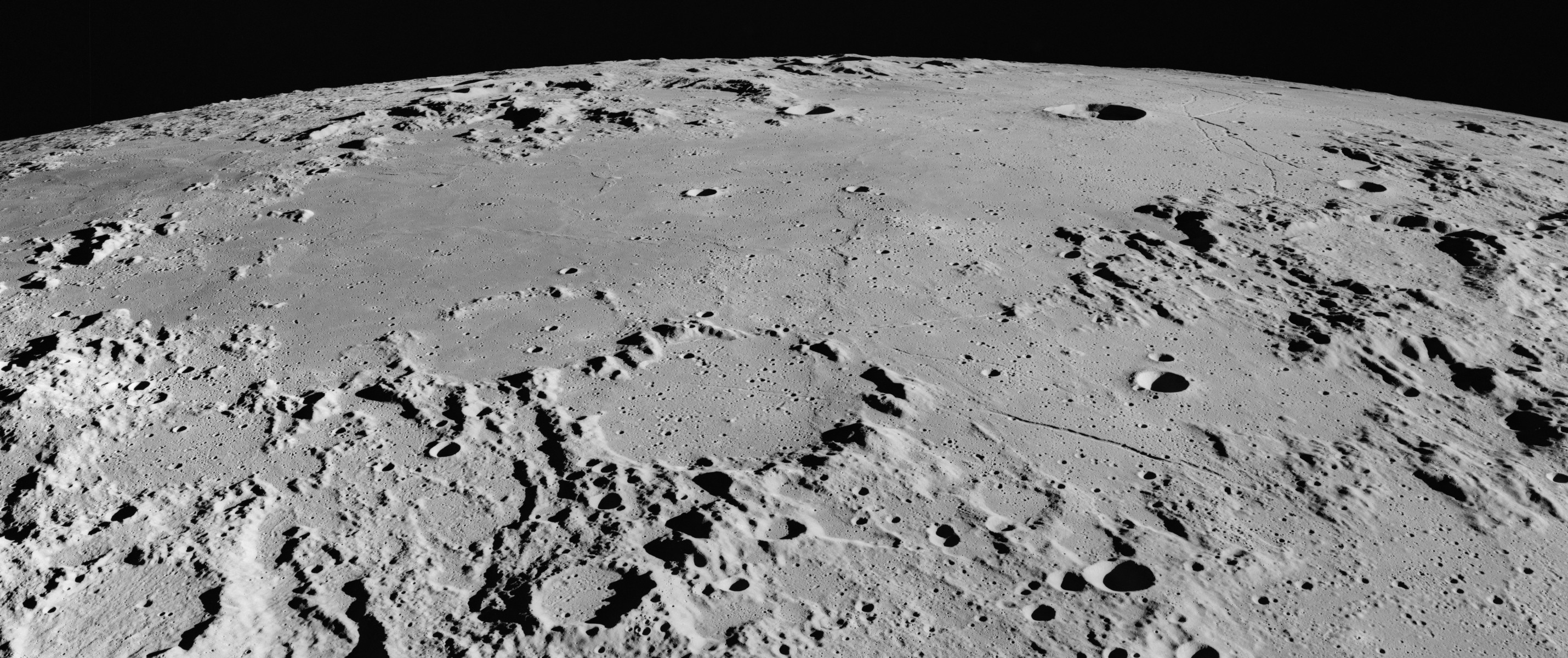
Oblique view facing north from Apollo 16

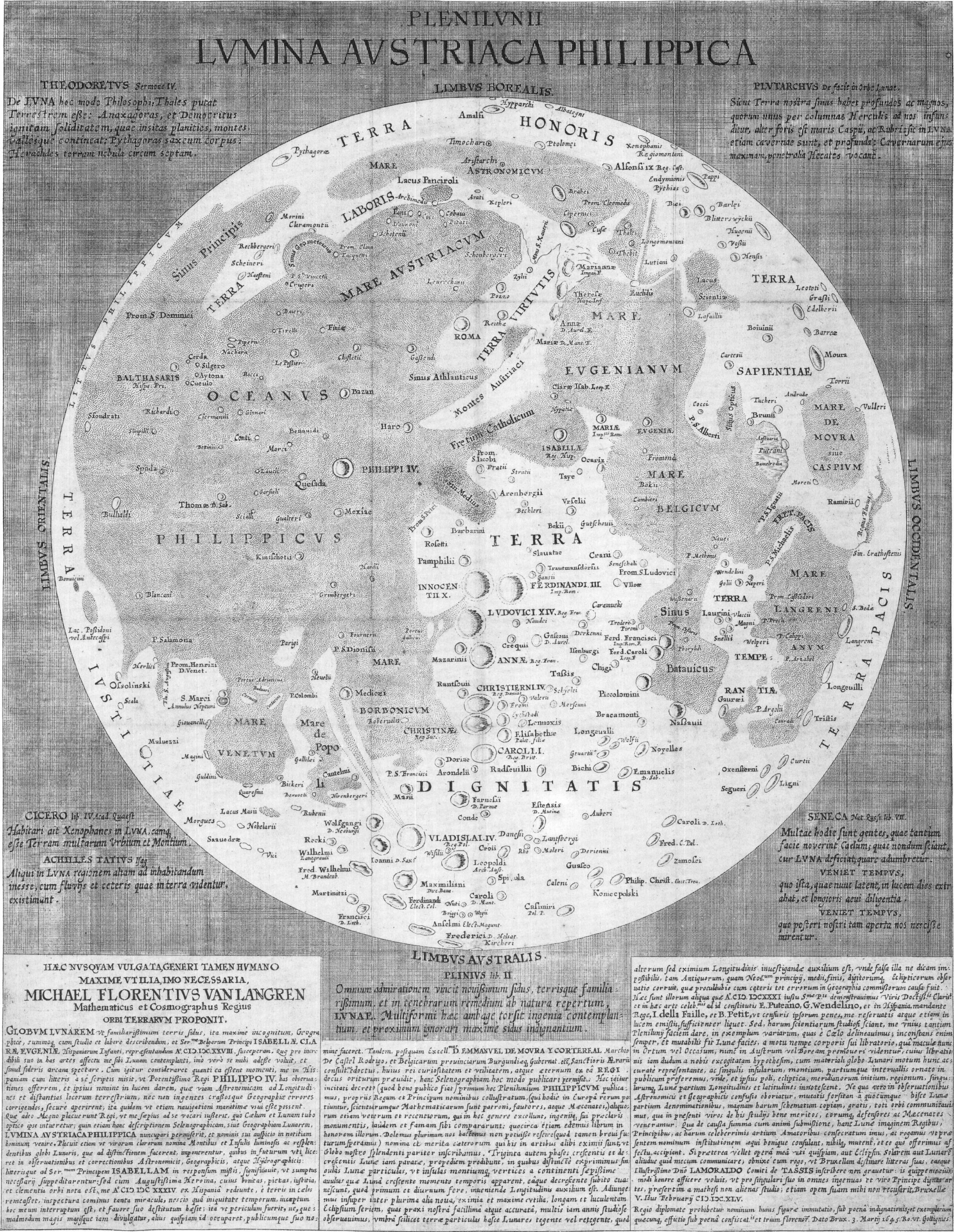
Langren's map (1645), on which the name Sinus Medius first appeared

== Description ==
The selenographic coordinates of Sinus Medii are 1.6°N 1.0°E, and its diameter is 287 km. It joins Mare Insularum in the west with Mare Vaporum to the north. The eastern part of this area is notable for a series of rille systems. In the far northeast is the Rima Hyginus, which is bisected by the crater Hyginus. At the far eastern end is the 220-km long Rima Ariadaeus rille which continues eastward to the edge of the Mare Tranquillitatis. At longitudes 4-6° E is the Rimae Triesnecker rille system, named after the crater Triesnecker just to the west.

The northern edge of the Sinus Medii is formed by a highland region, with the impact craters Murchison and Pallas along the border. Near the northern border on this mare is the cup-shaped Chladni. Another highland region lies to the south and southeastern edge of the Sinus Medii. Several flooded craters lie along this border, with Flammarion near the western edge, then Oppolzer, Réaumur, and Seeliger further east. The Rima Flammarion and Rima Oppolzer rilles lie along the edge of the mare near their corresponding craters. Also along the southeast border and bisecting the equator is the crater Rhaeticus. In the western half of the interior are the small craters Bruce and Blagg. Near the western end of the mare are the flooded craters Schröter and Sömmering.

== Names ==
The English astronomer William Gilbert was the first to give a name to this mare, calling it Insula Medilunaria ("Middlemoon Island"). The idea for its present name originates with Michael van Langren, who labelled it Sinus Medius in his 1645 map. Johannes Hevelius called the feature Mare Adriaticum ("The Adriatic Sea") in his 1647 map. Giovanni Riccioli called it Sinus Aestuum ("Bay of Hot Days") in his 1651 map.

== Exploration ==
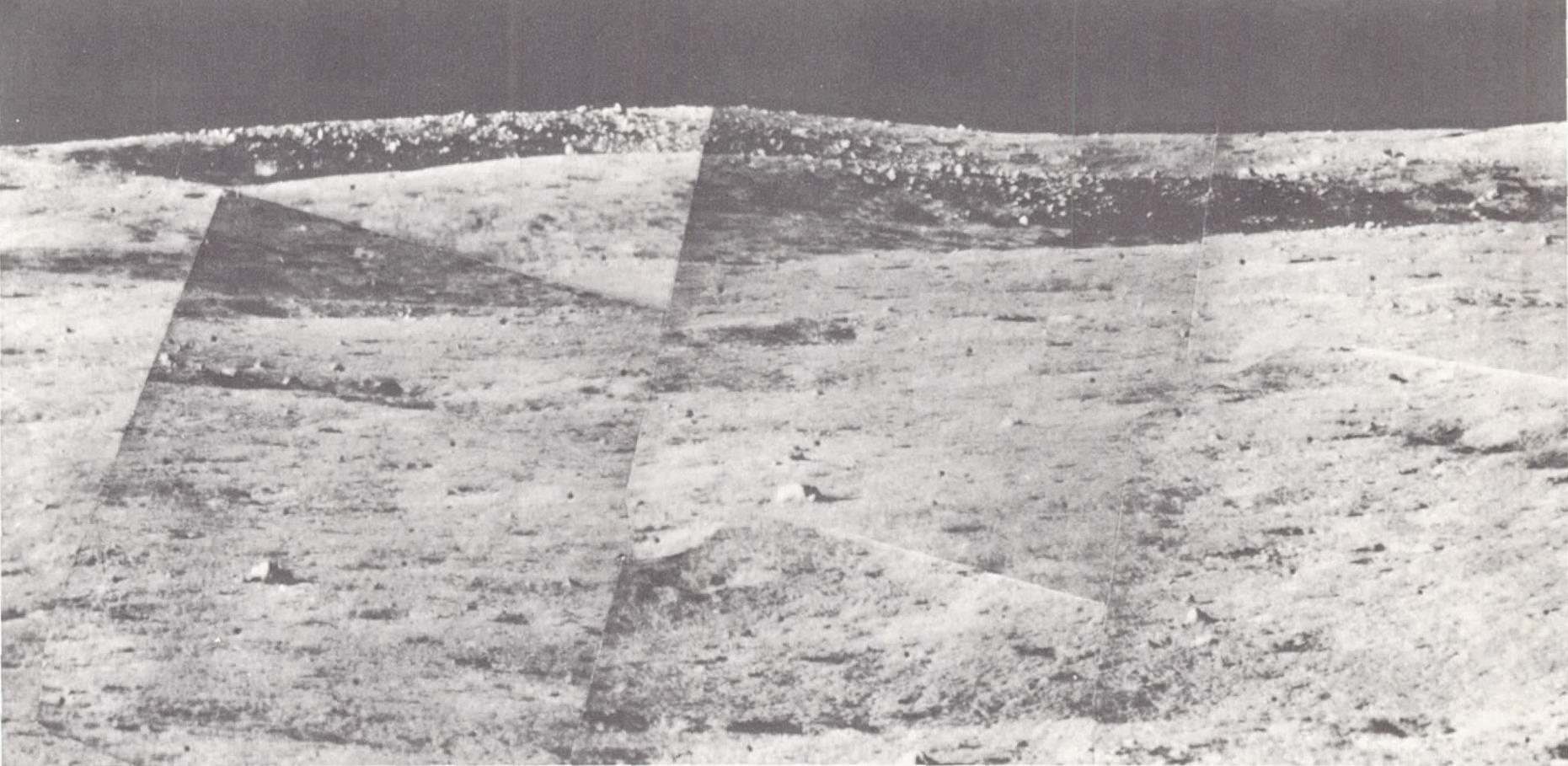
Mosaic of the mare surface from Surveyor 6

The Surveyor 6 mission landed to the west-southwest of Bruce crater inside Sinus Medii in November 1967. Prior to that in July 1967, the Surveyor 4 had crashed nearby.

During the Apollo program, Sinus Medii was designated Apollo Landing Site 3 (ALS3). Flight operations planners were concerned about having the optimum lighting conditions at the landing site. Hence, alternative landing sites moved progressively westward, following the terminator. A delay of two days for weather or equipment reasons would have sent Apollo 11 to Sinus Medii instead of ALS2, Mare Tranquillitatis, where it actually landed. Another two-day delay would have resulted in ALS5, a site in Oceanus Procellarum, being targeted.
