= Triesnecker (crater) =

Crater on the Moon

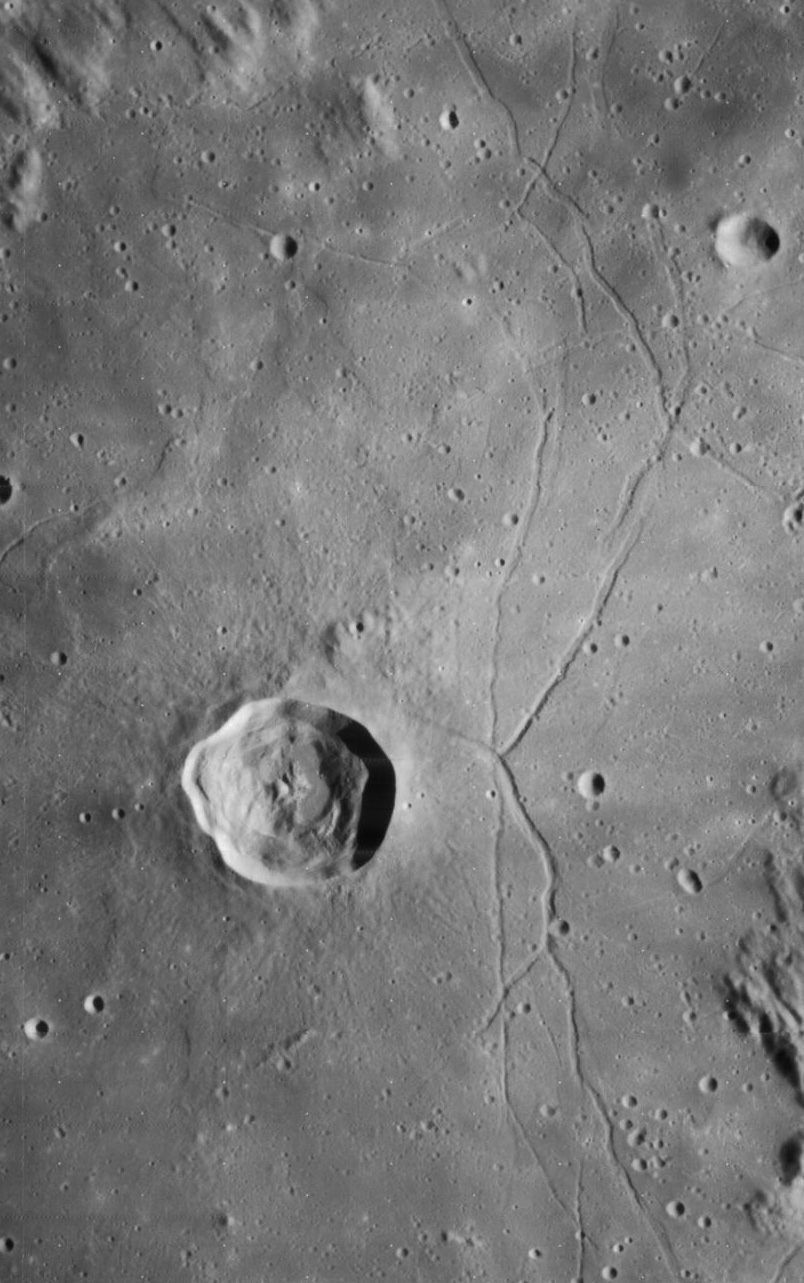
- Lunar Orbiter 4 image of Triesnecker crater and the Rille system
- Coordinates: 4.18°N 3.60°E
- Diameter: 25 km
- Depth: 2.74 km (1.70 mi)
- Colongitude: 356° at sunrise
- Formation: Copernican
- Eponym: Franz de Paula Triesnecker

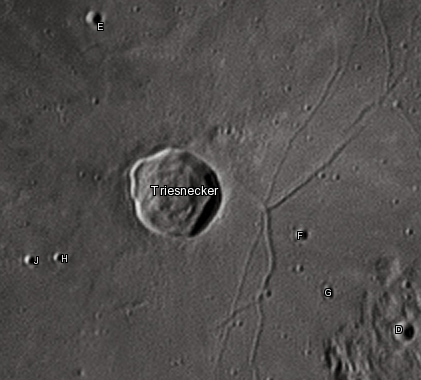
Triesnecker crater and its satellite craters taken from Earth

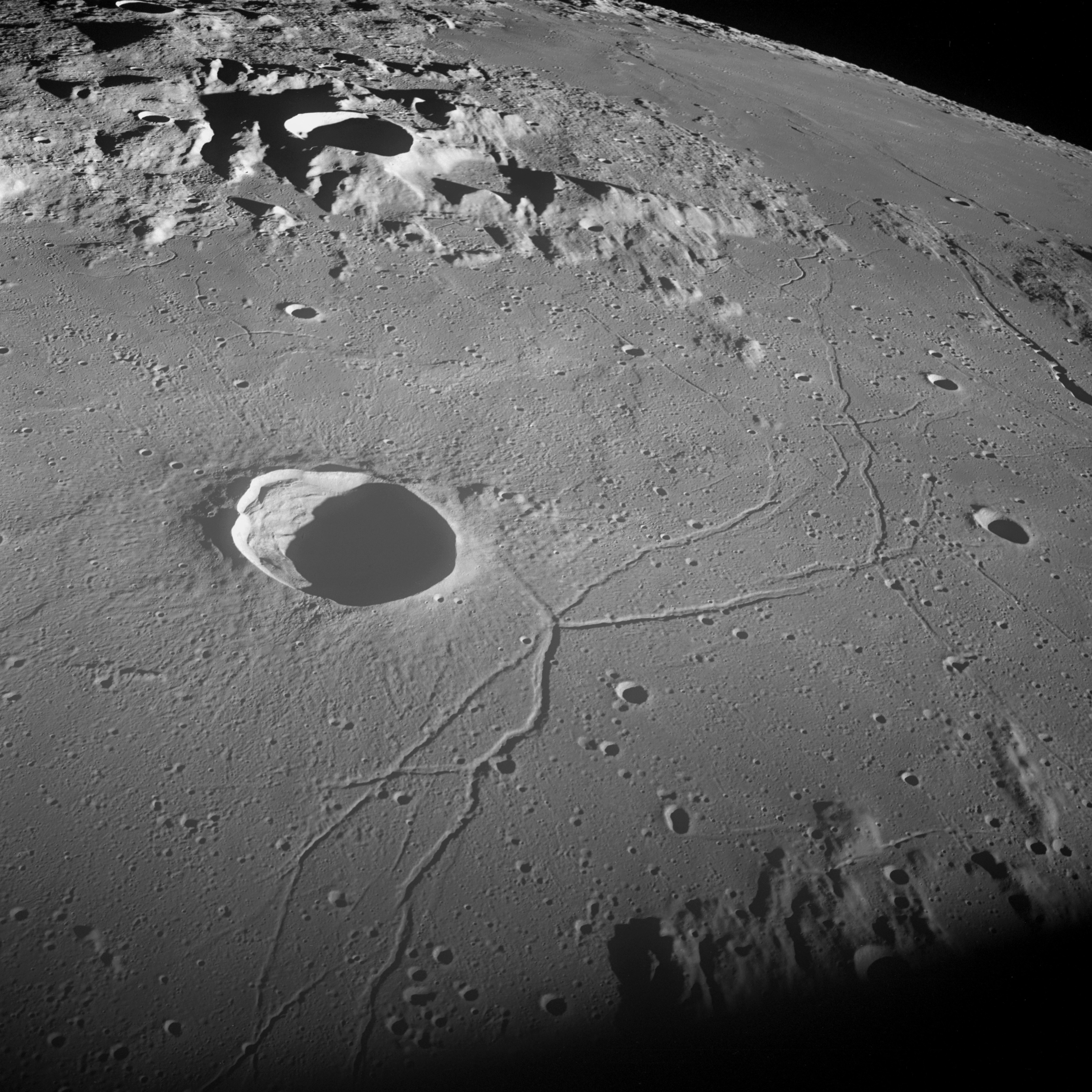
Oblique Apollo 10 image

Triesnecker is a prominent lunar impact crater that is located in the Sinus Medii, near the central part of the Moon's near side. T. W. Webb noted it is "surrounded by several minute clefts". This crater has a diameter of 25 km. It is located to the north-northwest of the crater Rhaeticus, and to the east-southeast of the flooded Murchison.

The crater rim of Triesnecker is somewhat distorted from a circular shape, having a notable bulge in the western wall, and lesser rises in the southeastern and northeastern rims. The inner walls are terraced and the interior is somewhat rough, with a central peak at the midpoint. Triesnecker has a ray system that is most prominent when the sun is at a high angle. The rays extend over 300 kilometers.

To the east of this crater is an extensive system of rilles extending over an area 200 kilometers across, running generally north–south. These were likely created by tectonic forces beneath the surface. Beyond, to the northeast, is the Rima Hyginus valley, with the crater Hyginus at the midpoint.

This feature was named after Austrian astronomer Franz de Paula Triesnecker.

== Satellite craters ==
By convention these features are identified on lunar maps by placing the letter on the side of the crater midpoint that is closest to Triesnecker.

Triesnecker	Latitude	Longitude	Diameter
D	3.5° N	6.0° E	6 km
E	5.6° N	2.5° E	5 km
F	4.1° N	4.8° E	4 km
G	3.7° N	5.2° E	3 km
H	3.3° N	2.8° E	3 km
J	3.3° N	2.5° E	3 km
