= Rille =

Fissure, especially on the Moon

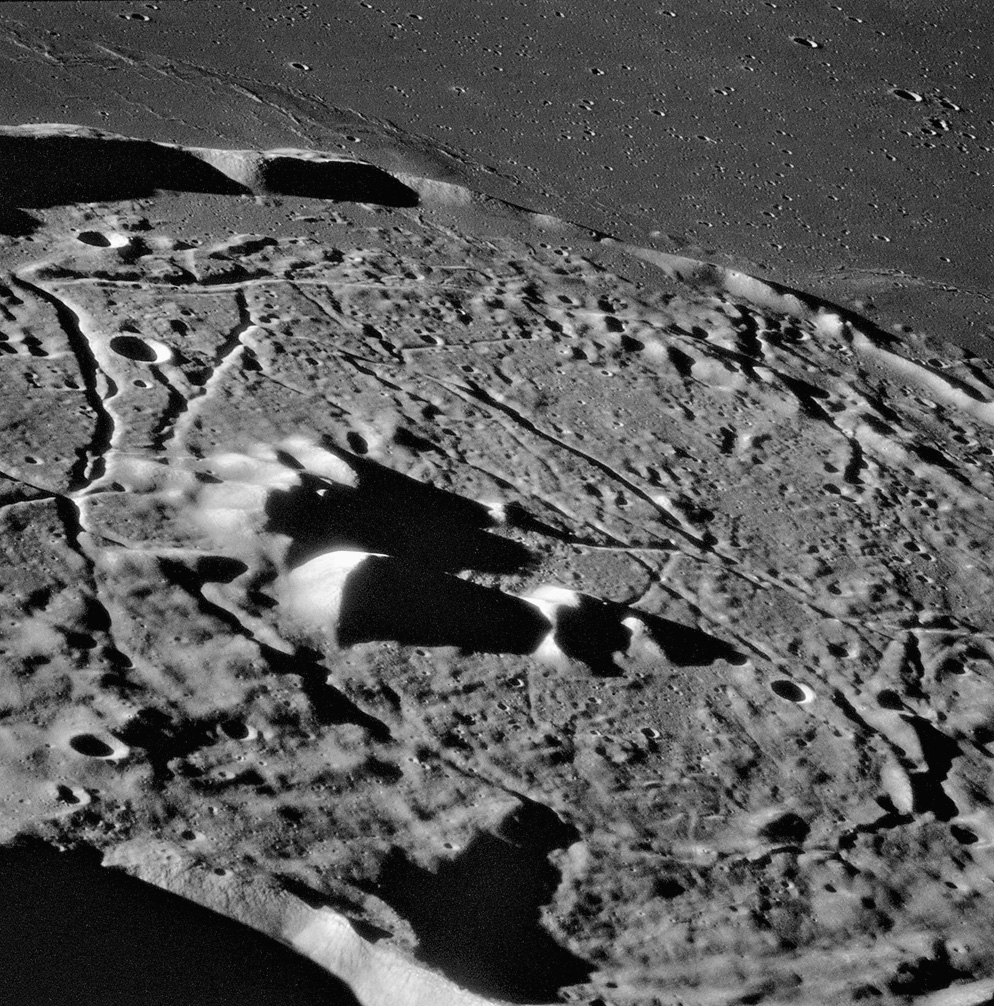
Rimae on the floor of the lunar crater Gassendi, from Apollo 16.

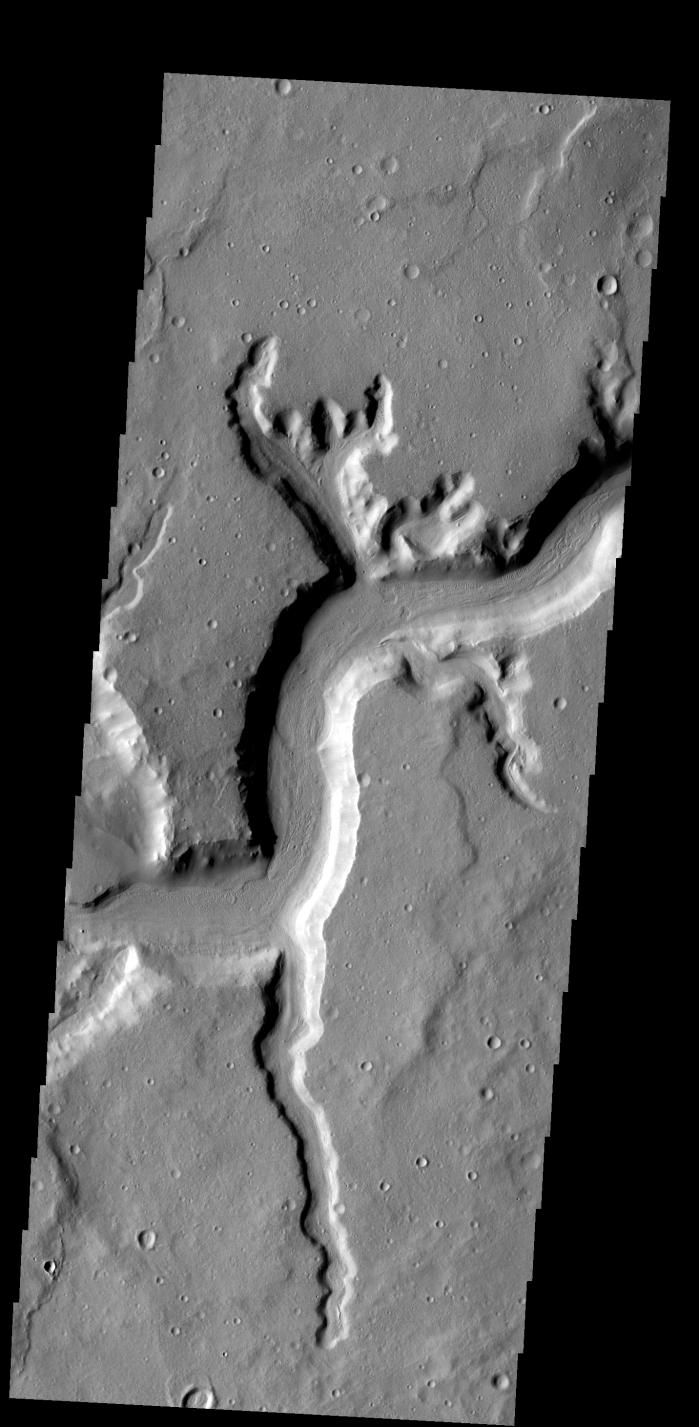
Mamers Valles rille on Mars.

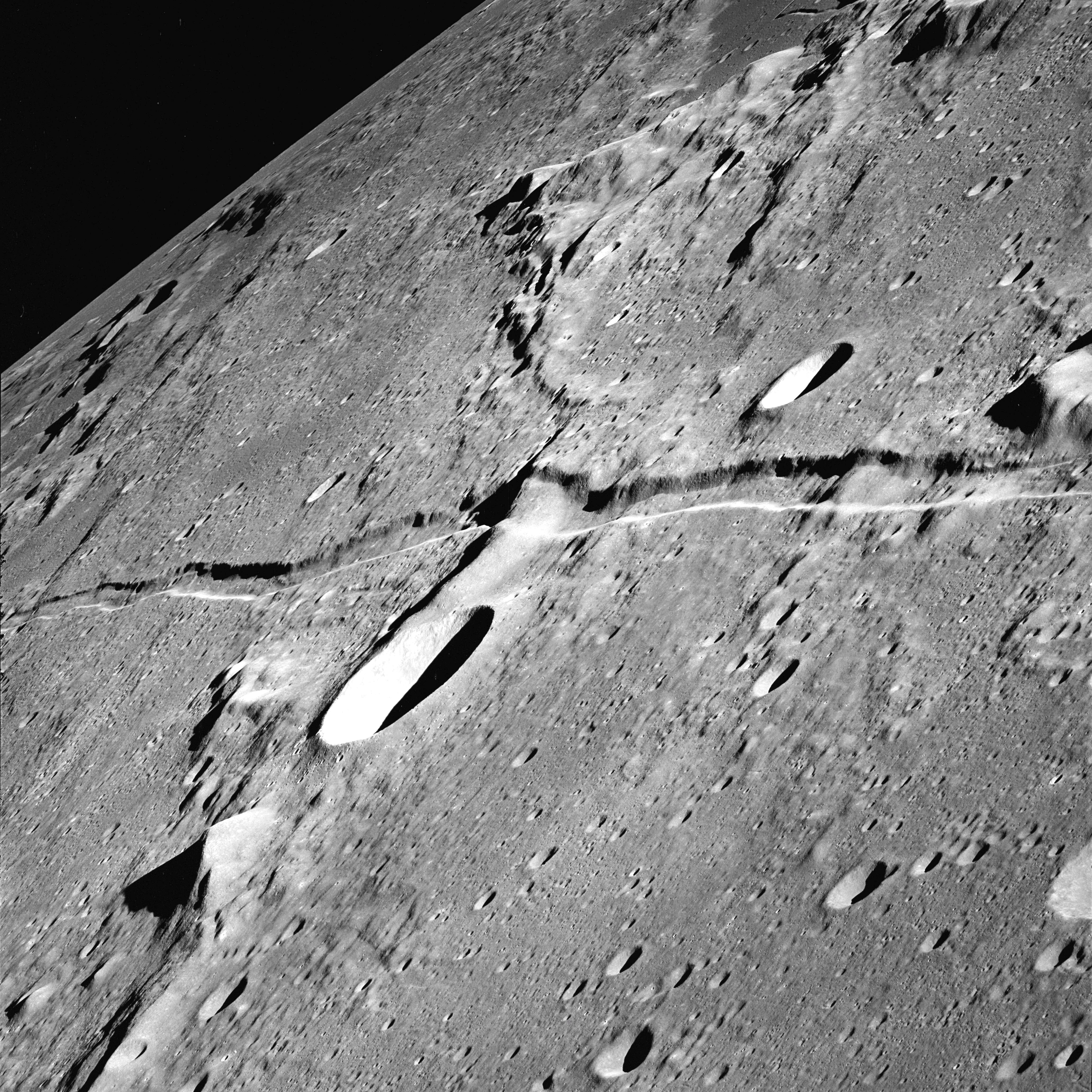
Rima Ariadaeus is categorized as a straight rille (graben) and is over 300 km in length.

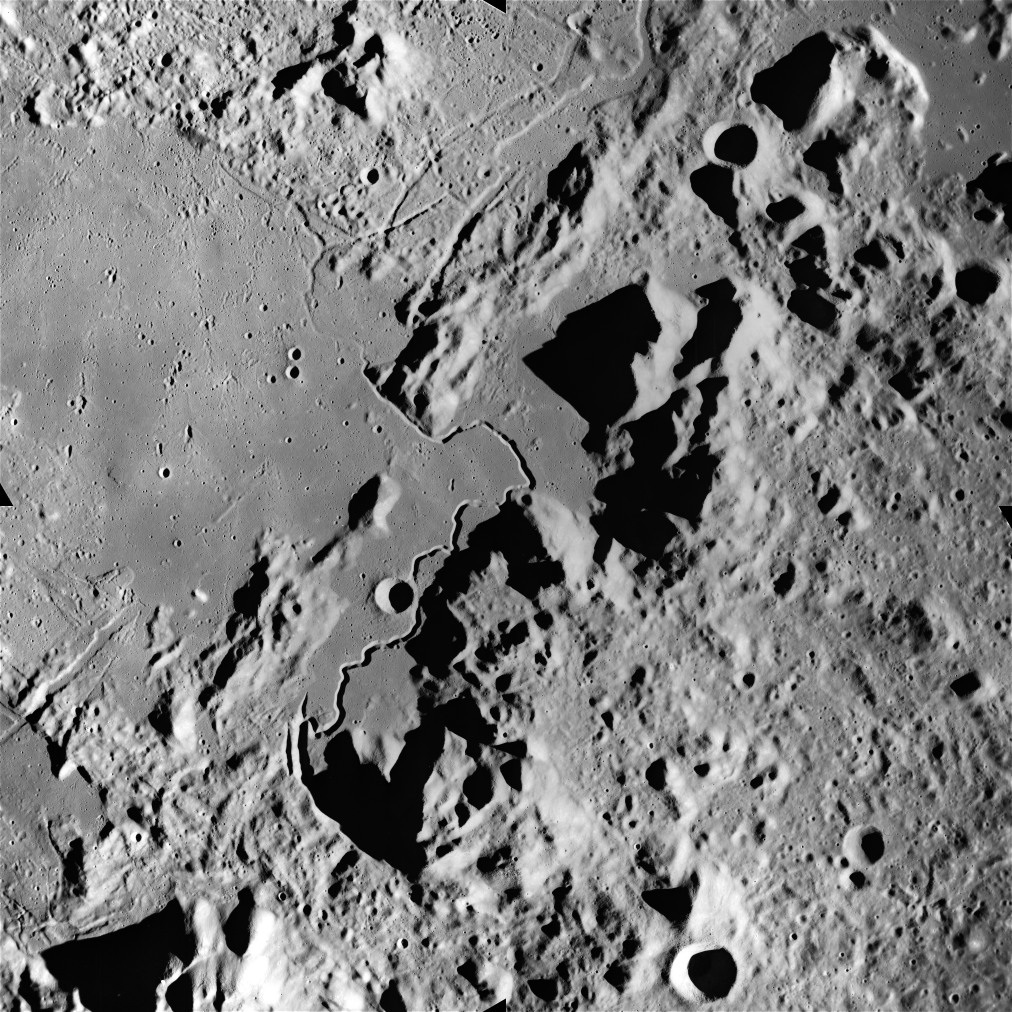
Hadley Rille at center is a sinuous rille visited by the Apollo 15 mission.

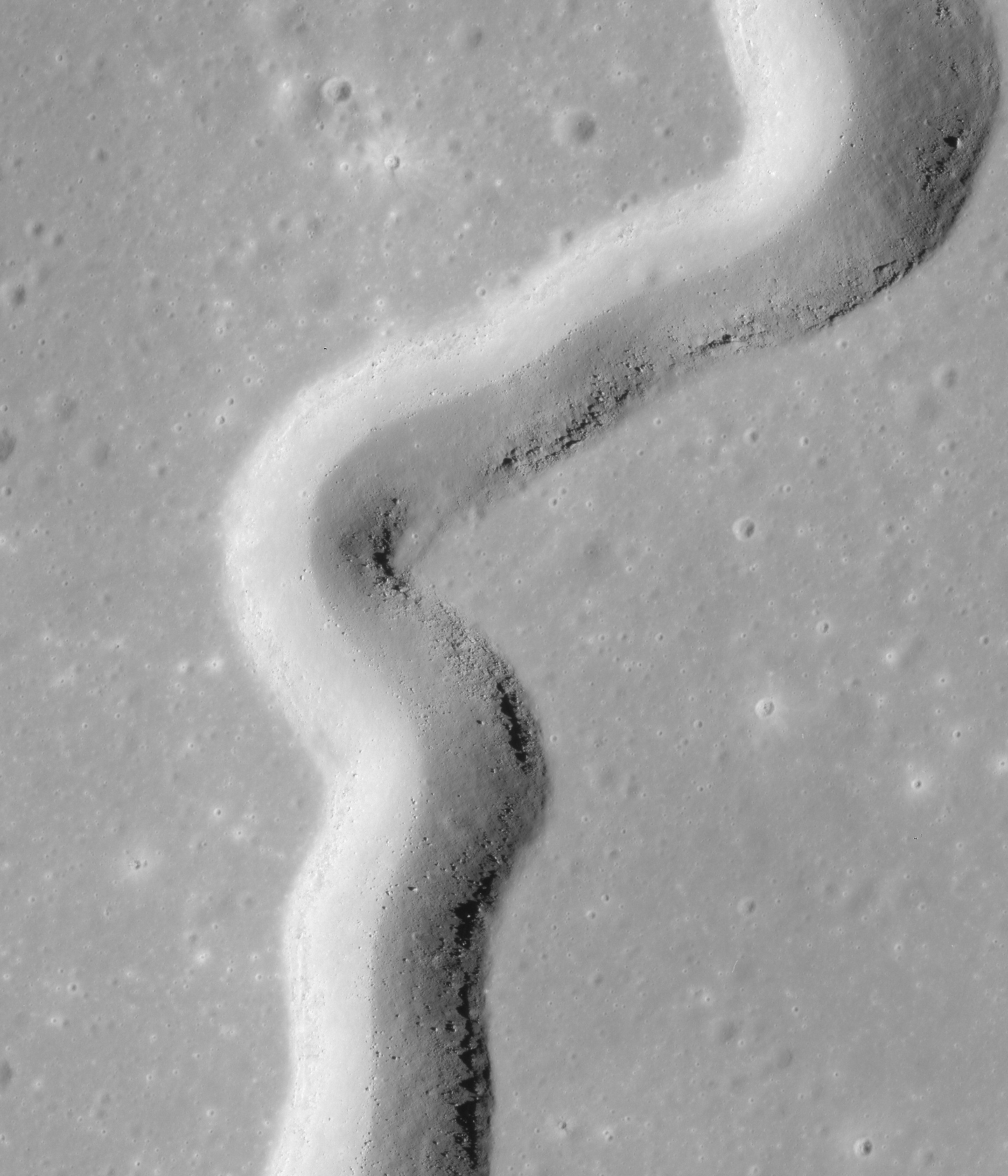
Detail of part of Hadley Rille

Rille /ˈrɪl/ (German for 'groove') is typically used to describe any of the long, narrow depressions in the surface of the Moon that resemble channels. The Latin term is rima, plural rimae. Typically, a rille can be several kilometers wide and hundreds of kilometers in length. However, the term has also been used loosely to describe similar structures on a number of planets in the Solar System, including Mars, Venus, and on a number of moons. All bear a structural resemblance to each other.

== Structures ==
Three types of rille are found on the lunar surface:

- Sinuous rilles meander in a curved path like a mature river, and are commonly thought to be the remains of collapsed lava tubes or extinct lava flows. They usually begin at an extinct volcano, then meander and sometimes split as they are followed across the surface. As of 2013, 195 sinuous rilles have been identified on the Moon. Vallis Schröteri in Oceanus Procellarum is the largest sinuous rille, and Rima Hadley is the only one visited by humans, on the Apollo 15 mission. Another prominent example is Rima Herigonius.
- Arcuate rilles have a smooth curve and are found on the edges of the dark lunar maria. They are believed to have formed when the lava flows that created a mare cooled, contracted and sank. These are found all over the Moon, examples can be seen near the south-western border of Mare Tranquillitatis and on the south-eastern border of Mare Humorum. Rima Sulpicius Gallus is a clear example in southwestern Mare Serenitatis.
- Straight rilles follow long, linear paths and are believed to be grabens, sections of the crust that have sunk between two parallel faults. These can be readily identified when they pass through craters or mountain ranges. Vallis Alpes is by far the largest graben rille, indeed it is regarded as too large to be called a rille and is itself bisected by a linear rille; Rima Ariadaeus, west of Mare Tranquillitatis, is a clearer example.

Rilles which show more than one structure are termed hybrid rilles. Rima Hyginus in Sinus Medii is an example, initially formed through a fault and subsequently subject to volcanic activity.

== Formation ==
Precise formation mechanisms of rilles have yet to be determined. It is likely that the different types are formed by different processes. Common features shared by lunar rilles and similar structures on other bodies suggest that common causative mechanisms operate widely in the solar system. Leading hypotheses include lava channels, collapsed lava tubes, near-surface dike intrusion, nuée ardente (pyroclastic cloud), subsidence of lava-covered basin and crater floors, and tectonic extension. On-site examinations would be necessary to clarify the actual processes.

=== Sinuous rilles ===
According to NASA, the origin of lunar sinuous rilles remains controversial. The Hadley Rille is a 1.5 km wide and over 300 m deep sinuous rille. It is thought to be a giant conduit that carried lava from an eruptive vent far to the south. Topographic information obtained from the Apollo 15 photographs supports this possibility; however, many puzzles about the rille remain.

== See also ==
- Arachnoid (astrogeology)
- Chaos terrain
- Dark dune spot
- List of features on the Moon
- Lunar lava tube
- Martian spiders (dark dune spots)
- Planetary geology
