= 1021 Flammario =

Dark background asteroid

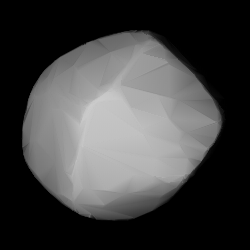
- Shape model of Flammario from its lightcurve

Discovery
- Discovered by: M. F. Wolf
- Discovery site: Heidelberg Obs.
- Discovery date: 11 March 1924

Designations
- Named after: Camille Flammarion (French astronomer)
- Alternative designations: 1924 RG · 1977 UM; A910 CE
- Minor planet category: main-belt · (outer) background

Orbital characteristics
- Epoch 23 March 2018 (JD 2458200.5)
- Uncertainty parameter 0
- Observation arc: 92.70 yr (33,857 d)
- Aphelion: 3.5188 AU
- Perihelion: 1.9556 AU
- Semi-major axis: 2.7372 AU
- Eccentricity: 0.2855
- Orbital period (sidereal): 4.53 yr (1,654 d)
- Mean anomaly: 10.840°
- Mean motion: 0° 13^{m} 3.36^{s} / day
- Inclination: 15.869°
- Longitude of ascending node: 115.44°
- Argument of perihelion: 286.97°

Physical characteristics
- Mean diameter: 84.78±22.26 km 97.38±1.23 km 97.96±34.85 km 98.015±8.377 km 99.39±2.3 km 99.6±19.9 km 100.765±1.608 km 105±11 km
- Mass: (8.6 ± 3.87/2.84)×10^{17} kg (9.3±3.9)×10^{17} kg (Note: Calculated from its standard gravitational parameter GM = 0.062±0.026 km^{3}/s^{2}.)
- Mean density: 1.606 ± 0.722/0.529 g/cm^{3} 1.72 g/cm^{3} (Note: Assuming a diameter of 101 km.)
- Synodic rotation period: 12.146±0.001 h 12.146 h 12.15186±0.00005 h 12.160±0.002 h 12.16 h
- Geometric albedo: 0.04±0.01; 0.04±0.06; 0.045±0.006; 0.0458±0.002; 0.0470±0.0200; 0.048±0.001; 0.05±0.02
- Spectral type: Tholen = F · F SMASS = B B–V = 0.656; U–B = 0.230
- Absolute magnitude (H): 9.06 8.98 9.03; 9.34±0.27

1021 Flammario, provisional designation 1924 RG, is a dark background asteroid from the central regions of the asteroid belt, approximately 100 kilometers (62 miles) in diameter. It was discovered on 11 March 1924, by German astronomer Max Wolf at the Heidelberg-Königstuhl State Observatory in Heidelberg, Germany. The asteroid was named after French astronomer Camille Flammarion. An F-type asteroid, it has a rotation period of 12.16 hours.

== Orbit and classification ==
Flammario is a non-family asteroid from the main belt's background population. It orbits the Sun in the central asteroid belt at a distance of 2.0–3.5 AU once every 4 years and 6 months (1,654 days; semi-major axis of 2.74 AU). Its orbit has an eccentricity of 0.29 and an inclination of 16° with respect to the ecliptic.

The asteroid was first observed as A910 CE at Taunton Observatory (803) in February 1910. The body's observation arc begins at the Pulkovo Observatory near Saint Petersburg, Russia, in January 1928, more than four years after its official discovery observation at Heidelberg.

== Physical characteristics ==
In the SMASS classification, Flammario is a "bright" carbonaceous B-type, while it is an uncommon F-type asteroid in the Tholen taxonomy. (The SMASS taxonomic scheme classifies all F-types as B-type asteroids). More recent polarimetric observations also characterized the asteroid as a dark F-type.

=== Rotation period ===
Several rotational lightcurves of Flammario have been obtained from photometric observations since the 1990s (U=2/2/2). Analysis of the best-rated lightcurve obtained by French amateur astronomer Laurent Bernasconi in January 2005 gave a rotation period of 12.160 hours with a consolidated brightness amplitude between 0.14 and 0.40 magnitude (U=3-).

=== Poles ===
In 2016, a modeled lightcurve using photometric data from various sources, rendered a similar sidereal period of 12.15186 hours and two spin axes of (32.0°, 22.0°) and (216.0°, 55.0°) in ecliptic coordinates.

=== Diameter and albedo ===
According to the surveys carried out by the Infrared Astronomical Satellite IRAS, the Japanese Akari satellite and the NEOWISE mission of NASA's Wide-field Infrared Survey Explorer, Flammario measures between 84.78 and 105 kilometers in diameter and its surface has a low albedo between 0.04 and 0.05.

The Collaborative Asteroid Lightcurve Link adopts the results obtained by IRAS, that is, an albedo of 0.0458 and a diameter of 99.39 kilometers based on an absolute magnitude of 8.98.

=== Mass, density and porosity ===
Fienga et al. estimated the mass of Flammario as (8.6 ± 3.87/2.84)×10^{17} kg, with a theoretical bulk density of 1.606 ± 0.722/0.529 g/cm^{3}. Small Solar System bodies may have 20% of more porosity (which decreases with the size of the body due to self-gravity). The carbonaceous outer-belt asteroids typically show a higher macroporosity than the basaltic, stony asteroids from the inner regions of the asteroid belt.

== Naming ==
This minor planet was named after renowned French astronomer Camille Flammarion (1842–1925), who founded the French Astronomical Society (French: Société astronomique de France) and the astronomical journal L'Astronomie in the 1880s. The official naming citation was mentioned in The Names of the Minor Planets by Paul Herget in 1955 (H 98). The lunar crater Flammarion as well as the crater Flammarion on Mars were also named in his honor.
