= Flammarion =

Flammarion may refer to:

- Camille Flammarion (1842–1925), French astronomer and author
- Ernest Flammarion (1846–1936), French publisher and founder of Groupe Flammarion
- Gabrielle Renaudot Flammarion (1877–1962), French astronomer, second wife of Camille Flammarion
- Sylvie Flammarion (1836-1919), French feminist and pacifist, first wife of Camille Flammarion
- Flammarion engraving by unknown artist; appeared in a book by Camille Flammarion
- Flammarion (lunar crater), a lunar crater named after Camille Flammarion
- Flammarion (Martian crater), a Martian crater named after Camille Flammarion
- Groupe Flammarion, a French publishing company
- Camille Flammarion Observatory, the astronomical observatory
