= Spörer (crater) =

Crater on the Moon

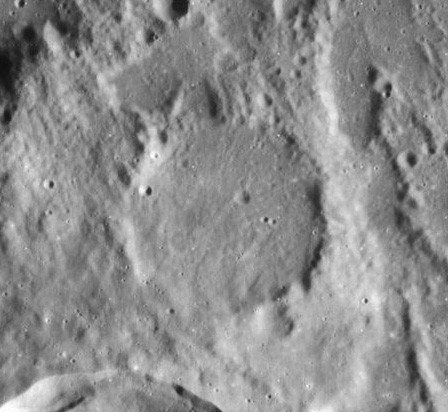
- Lunar Orbiter 4 image
- Coordinates: 4.3°S 1.8°E
- Diameter: 26 km
- Depth: 0.3 km
- Colongitude: 2° at sunrise
- Eponym: Gustav Spörer

Spörer is a lunar impact crater that lies just to the north of the crater Herschel, and southeast of the lava-flooded Flammarion. To the southeast is Gyldén, and to the northeast is Réaumur.

Its diameter is 26 km. The crater is named after German astronomer Gustav Spörer.

The floor of this crater has been flooded with basaltic lava, leaving only a shallow rim above the surface. The narrow rim is roughly circular but irregular and broken in several locations. The rim has a slight outward bulge to the northwest. The interior of the crater is level and featureless.

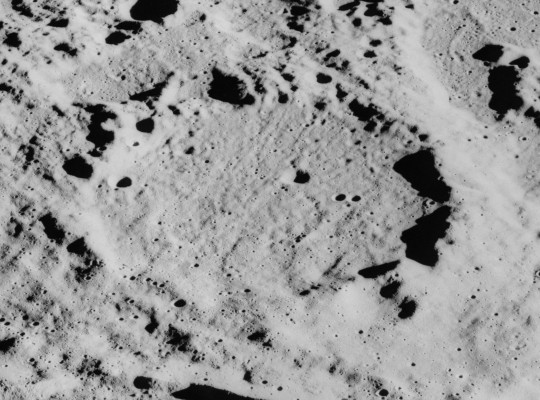
Oblique view from Apollo 16

== Satellite craters ==
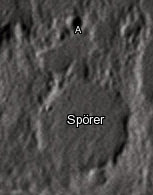
Sporer crater and its satellite craters taken from Earth in 2012 at the University of Hertfordshire's Bayfordbury Observatory with the telescopes Meade LX200 14" and Lumenera Skynyx 2-1

By convention these features are identified on lunar maps by placing the letter on the side of the crater midpoint that is closest to Spörer.

Spörer	Latitude	Longitude	Diameter
A	3.4° S	2.1° W	5 km
