= Flamarion =

Flamarion may refer to:

- Flamarion (footballer, born 1951) (1951–2020), Brazilian football manager and former midfielder Flamarion Nunes Tomazolli
- Flamarion (footballer, born 1996), Brazilian football forward Flamarion Jovinho Filho
- the title character of The Great Flamarion, a 1945 noir mystery film, played by Erich von Stroheim

== See also ==
- Flamarion's tuco-tuco, South American rodent species
- Flammarion (disambiguation)
