= Alita (Battle Angel Alita) =

Fictional character in the cyberpunk manga series Battle Angel Alita

- Battle Angel Alita character
- Alita in Battle Angel Alita: Last Order
- First appearance: Battle Angel Alita chapter 1: "Rusty Angel" (錆びた天使 Sabita Tenshi), 1990
- Created by: Yukito Kishiro
- Portrayed by: Rosa Salazar
- Voiced by: Japanese Miki Itō (OVA) Mone Kamishiraishi (Alita: Battle Angel); English Amanda Winn-Lee (OVA; ADV Films dub) Larissa Murray (OVA; Manga UK dub)

In-universe information
- Aliases: Yoko; 99; HK-BR035; A-1
- Nicknames: Yoko von der Rasierklinge; Octopus Lips; Killing Angel; Angel of Death; Koshka; Last Order
- Species: Full-body cyborg (Battle Angel Alita, Mars Chronicle, Panzer Kunst Chronicle); Sentient android (Last Order, Mars Chronicle)
- Origin: Cydonia, Mars

Alita, or Gally (Japanese: ガリィ, Hepburn: Garii) in the original Japanese version, is the title character and the main protagonist of Yukito Kishiro's cyberpunk manga series Gunnm (known as Battle Angel Alita in the English translation) and its sequels Last Order, Mars Chronicle and Panzer Kunst Chronicle.

Originally a Martian cyborg named Yoko (陽子, Yōko), Alita is known for her fighting prowess as a practitioner of the powerful cyborg martial art Panzer Kunst (機甲術, Pantsā Kunsuto; lit. "armor art") and her racing skill at Motorball (モーターボール, Mōtā Bōru), the most popular sport in the western district of Scrapyard. Her background and past history were briefly hinted at in the original series, but were not explored until Last Order and more extensively in Mars Chronicle, which reveals that in her previous life she was highly instrumental in creating the world within which the manga series are set. During the 10th ZOTT, Alita is entrusted the relic "Fata Morgana" by Caerula Sanguis, which grants her direct access to the quantum supercomputer Melchizedek and makes her the Last Order agent.

Last Order reveals that Alita has been a cyborg since she was three years old, while Mars Chronicle reveals that she has been a cyborg her entire life since "birth". She has been shown in a human body twice – during the dream sequence after Bigott Eizenburg halted her imminent execution and offered to recruit her as a TUNED agent, she appeared as a young human woman wearing the long-sleeved white top and pants of an institution. In the epilogue of the original series, years after sacrificing herself to save Zalem from crashing down to Iron City, Alita was regenerated as a fully flesh-and-blood woman with long black hair and appeared to be taller than her typical height.

In the original manga, "Alita" was actually the name of her adopted father Daisuke Ido's black pet tomcat, who died a month before he found the remains of cyborg girl in the huge junkyard. The cat makes an appearance in the manga as part of a dream that Alita experiences while being trapped in Desty Nova's Ouroboros program. In the dream, Alita is named "Gally" while the cat is named "Alita". The side story "Holy Night" reveals that Ido took the original "Alita" in shortly after he arrived in the Scrapyard, at least five years before he found the cyborg Alita in the junkyard.

== Conception and creation ==
=== Character ===
Alita's appearance is that of a beautiful young woman of average height with shoulder-length dark hair. Although she used several cyborg bodies, her height has tended to remain consistent. The Japanese version of Angel Redux has a lineup of several characters in Last Order and shows that she is around 150 centimetres (4 ft 11 in) tall in her Imaginos 2.0 body. Beginning with her TUNED body, Alita's face features permanent eye black, although it did not appear in her first Imaginos body. In the 1993 OVA she is depicted as having red eyes and black hair. While her face is fair-skinned, the rest of her body has typically been a metallic grey.

During the course of the story Alita wore several outfits. In her first cyborg body, this consisted of casual wear in the form of a shirt, track pants and sneakers. After gaining the Berserker Body, she switched to attire more appropriate for a hunter-warrior (bounty-hunter) that featured black sleeveless leather catsuit with fingerless gloves combined with brown knee-high boots and a light yellow trench coat. In Gunnm: Martian Memory, the trench coat is omitted.

Her Motorball body is depicted as being purple, with the number "99" in yellow on the cover of the third manga volume ("Killing Angel"), the 3D special and in Gunnm: Martian Memory. When not on the track, Alita wore dark pants over the lower half of the body, while switching out the upper half, over which she wore a jacket as well as dark fingerless gloves. While using her second civilian body she is first shown wearing a hat, a short black dress, light-coloured jacket, dark fingerless gloves, dark pantyhose and dark boots. She later wore a sleeveless dark top, dark elbow pads, dark fingerless gloves, jeans, and white shoes.

As a TUNED agent, Alita wore a black bodysuit with body armour, over which she typically wore a cape. Two illustrations that initially appeared in Business Jump and are reproduced in the Guncyclopedia depict the bodysuit as being red while the armour is white. The cover illustration of volume 5 of the Gunnm: Complete Edition depicts the bodysuit as being black and the armour a light green. In Gunnm: Martian Memory the bodysuit is a dark green with the armour in a lighter shade of green. Her signature weapon is a sword known as the Damascus Blade, which consists of two separate blades joined together.

=== Personality ===
"Why do they not fight to conquer their weakness? Why do they accept it, and find solace in that fact?"

— Alita

Alita is known for her fierce determination and willingness to back this up with force when necessary. This is in stark contrast to her docile personality when she was a young girl, as she was much less certain of herself and tended to rely on her companion Erica for support. Nonetheless, she developed into a highly competent Künstler who was assigned to carry out Operation Maulwurf in ES 386, when she was 16. After she was caught and sentenced to atmospheric drop as punishment, she lost most of her memories and temporarily her personality after atmospheric entry and crash landing near Star City.

When she was discovered two centuries later by Daisuke Ido and resuscitated, Alita's initial personality was that of an innocent teenage girl. However, after she saved him from the mutant woman, she began to instinctively recall her past Panzer Kunst training and also became much more confident and independent. Against Ido's wishes she decided to become a hunter-warrior in order to rediscover her memories through fighting. Alita has proven highly resilient as she has had to face her inner doubts and fears many times but has been able to rebound each time and reaffirm her belief in herself.

In Last Order, she suffered a mental breakdown when she discovered that her brain had been replaced with a brain bio-chip and her body was subsequently dissolved by Super Nova's Seca attack. However, after Melchizedek called out to her failing consciousness she responded, allowing her to be resurrected after fusing with Tunguska and absorbing its wormhole core. Her personality has become markedly more cat-like and mischievous, a physical manifestation of which is a tail that she chose to transform from a piece of Tunguska that was stuck to her rear end.

=== Background ===
From flashbacks in the original series, and further elaborated on in Last Order and Mars Chronicle, Alita remembered that she is from Mars and that her original name is Yoko. As a young adult, Yoko was part of a group of Künstlers whose final mission was to target Earth's orbital ring during the Terraforming Wars. At the penultimate moment, her comrades were ambushed by an unknown opponent. Yoko escaped, but was left to crash onto Earth. This event was later retconned by Last Order and Mars Chronicle, which elaborate more on Yoko's recruitment and activities as a Künstler.

==== Early life ====
Originally codenamed HK-BR035, Yoko was "born" in Cydonia in ES 370 during the crumbling Archduchy Era that was plagued with civil wars, as a maske tumor extracted from a woman named Nollin Sonann and grafted into a mechanical body, and is the only known successful case of such experiments that produced a healthy, viable subject. When the villain Baron Muster (Nollin's vengeful brother) learned of her existence, he took her away and named her Yoko, and used her in a conspiracy plotted with Marquis Maruki Baumburg to overthrow Cydonia's ruling queen Kagura Dornburg. As a result of Muster falsifying records to state that Yoko was Kagura's daughter (and thus had a claim to Kagura's throne), Yoko was abducted by the Cydonian armed forces and forced to walk across a minefield as a means of execution. As Yoko was unable to walk because she was too young to properly control her mechanical body, a sympathetic one-eyed girl named Erica Wald volunteered to accompany her. After walking together for a hundred paces, Yoko and Erica were rescued by a group of Panzer Kunst warriors, who slaughtered the soldiers. Left in the care of a nomadic medic named Finch, Yoko and Erica were left at an orphanage in the Flammarion town of Mamiana, which was later attacked and massacred by the renegade Papagei Corps. Yoko and Erica were the only two survivors (spared only for political propaganda purposes) and were later picked up by Finch, who returned half a day late and missed the slaughter. When the canopy membrane maintaining Mars' atmosphere was ruptured by an explosion, Yoko, Erica and Finch were rescued by Baldachin Association Gärtner Mui, who demanded they sacrifice their lives to restore the pillar that supports the canopy. However Mui was then contacted by her superior, who ordered them released according to a prophecy that one (or both) of Yoko and Erica would become the chosen one that could change humanity's direction.

Later, Finch was contacted by a woman called Kyoko Bima, who claimed to be Yoko's long-lost mother but in reality was an agent hired by Marquis Maruki to keep Yoko under custody. Yoko spent the next year living a happy comfortable life at the Baumburg Mansion under the watch of Kyoko, who actually developed a genuine maternal bond with her. When Muster came to visit Maruki to discuss their plan, Erica, who had become Muster's apprentice, plotted for Kyoko and Yoko to run away with the help of two bounty-hunters. However, in the chase, the bounty-hunters were killed and Erica stabbed Kyoko dead before both girls were retrieved by Muster and Maruki. Later Muster's assistant Zoe revealed to the girls that Yoko was not genetically related to Princess Kagura and her real genetic mother was Muster's late sister Nollin.

After impressing Künstlers with her combat skill thanks to accidentally ingesting the Leaf of Nagendra, a rare Martian artefact, Yoko was admitted into the mercenary organization Grünthal alongside Erica and was trained in Panzer Kunst at Grünthal's Mauser School, although she might also have received training on techniques from the Schneider School and possibly the vanished Gossen School. However, as teenagers the two childhood friends had a falling-out, which resulted in Yoko mortally wounding Erica during a sparring. As an intermediate Geselle level Künstler, Yoko was recruited into the Mauser School's covert op unit Kammer Gruppe, and earned the nickname "Yoko von der Rasierklinge" ("Razorblade Yoko") for her ferocious efficiency in combat. In ES 386 during the height of the interplanetary Terraforming War, the 16-year-old Yoko was picked to carry out Operation Maulwurf against the Venusian-Earth alliance, and managed to infiltrate Ketheres and upload a virus into the supercomputer Melchizedek. This disrupted the navigational systems of the five Leviathan-class colony ships, destroying four and killing 450,000 civilians, as well as causing a complete Gestalt breakdown in Melchizedek's organizational processes, from which it never fully recovered. After this event (known as the Camranh Tragedy), Yoko was captured by Caerula Sanguis and tried as a class-A war criminal, and was sentenced to death by immolation via atmospheric drop as punishment. Due to special protocol built into her cyborg body, Yoko's brain survived atmospheric entry, but crash-landed near Star City where she lay in suspended animation for almost 200 years.

== Depiction ==
=== Battle Angel Alita ===
In ES 577, Yoko's damaged head and torso were found by the exiled Tipharean cyberphysician Daisuke Ido when he was searching the dump for spare parts. When Ido discovered that she was still alive, he took the cyborg girl back to his clinic to rebuild her. As she was an amnesiac, he named her after his recently deceased black tomcat, Alita. When the reconstructed Alita suspects Ido of murdering women to provide her body parts, her guilt caused her to stalk and confront Ido, only to discover that he is a hunter-warrior seeking the true killer. When protecting the injured Ido, her fighting caused an instinctive recollection of the lost Martian battle technique "Panzer Kunst", which allowed her to quickly deliver a single killing blow to the murderer. She decided to become a hunter-warrior herself, in which job Alita occasionally displayed a disturbing bloodlust and love of battle. When fighting the powerful, body-snatching and brain-eating cyborg named Makaku, the original body that Ido had made for Alita was destroyed. Feeling he has no other choice, Ido reconnected Alita to a Berserker Body, which allowed her to kill an upgraded Makaku in a long fight in the sewers beneath the Scrapyard.

Shortly after becoming a hunter-warrior, Alita met and fell in love with Hugo, a young boy who dreamed of going to Tiphares. Hugo's obsession with Tiphares wound up ruining any chance of them being together, as he was caught mugging cyborgs for their spinal columns and had a bounty placed on him. Alita protected Hugo from Zapan – resulting in the latter's humiliation – and resuscitated him. However, upon Vector telling Hugo that going to Tiphares alive was impossible, Hugo snapped and tried to scale the massive pipes connecting the Factories to the floating city. Alita tried to persuade Hugo to turn back, but a defense ring threaded him to pieces and Alita was unable to save Hugo from falling to his death.

After Hugo's death, the grieving Alita ran away from home. She was found crying in a bar by Esdoc, a former Top League Motorball player, who talked her into signing a 12-race contract. To keep her from quitting, Esdoc secretly sold Alita's Berserker Body to the mad scientist Desty Nova. Alita's final and greatest match was against Jashugan, the Top League champion whose mastery of chi' enabled him to surpass the limits of his body despite having been mortally wounded. Alita was defeated but survived the fight to become the champion. She then retired from Motorball and lived as a civilian for two years, taking up music and often performing as a bar singer. Later on, Desty Nova attached Zapan's brain to the Berserker Body, creating a rampaging monster that killed Ido and destroyed Bar New Kansas. Promising to resurrect Ido, Nova provided Alita with a Smith & Wesson Model 610 revolver and a capsule containing collapser, a nanite agent designed to destroy Berserker cells. After a battle that almost ended in Zapan assimilating her, Alita managed to shoot and kill Zapan with the collapser-loaded hollow-point bullets. She was then apprehended by Factory forces and sentenced to death for the Class A crime of using a firearm.

The head of the Tipharean Ground Investigation Bureau, Bigott Eizenburg, intervened and managed to postpone Alita's execution. Bigott offered to give Alita a purpose in life working as an agent of Tiphares, but she refused until he mentioned that her primary mission would be to hunt down Desty Nova. Given a new body and weapons, Alita spent ten years working in the Badlands as the TUNED agent A-1, hunting down rogue Deckmen and other criminals. She quickly came to resent Bigott's callous attitude towards "surface dwellers" like her, and came to revel in combat and bloodlust as a means of drowning out her despair. In ES 590 she was tasked with eliminating the rebel organization Barjack. Cultivating a friendship with her new operator, Lou Collins, Alita also fell in love with a mercenary named Figure Four, who helped break her out of her fatalistic mindset while she accompanied him to his hometown of Alhambra. Promising to return once her business with TUNED was concluded, Alita learned that Desty Nova was behind Barjack and that if she wanted to find him she would have to defeat Barjack's leader, Den. After falling into a river and being rescued by a sickly radio host named Kaos, Alita persuaded him to stand up against Barjack and faced off with Den; discovering that not only was Kaos the son of Desty Nova but that Den was Kaos' split personality projected into a remote body. Locating the supposedly revived Ido with help from Kaos, Alita travelled to Farm 21 only to learn from nurse Kayna that Ido had erased his memories after learning the "truth about Tiphares". Learning that Nova's hideout was in the Granite Inn, Alita set out to apprehend him but was attacked by AR-2, one of the TUNED AR Series 2 androids that Bigott ordered to be built in order to replace Alita. With Lou's help Alita managed to kill AR-2, and persuaded Bigott to let her finish the original mission and win her freedom. Alita infiltrated Granite Inn and confronted Nova, who revealed the secret of Tiphares – that all adults had their brains extracted and replaced with brain bio-chips. With Bigott and several of the other adults going insane and committing suicide from this revelation, Nova trapped Alita inside a virtual reality called the Ouroboros Program and attempted to break her fighting spirit. Breaking free with Kaos' help, Alita decapitated Nova and set out to reunite with Figure Four, but was killed by a doll bomb planted by Nova, who had survived decapitation by having a second brain-ship installed into his abdomen. However, Nova then transports Alita's remains to Tiphares and resurrects her with a new "Imaginos Body" with a neuronal accelerator which gives her unlimited potential.

In the original series, Nova guides Alita to confront the Melchizedek – the supercomputer ruler of Tiphares – about the truth of Tiphares and Ketheres' history. Nova provokes Melchizedek too far, causing it to go haywire and self-destruct. To save Tiphares from falling and colliding with Scrapyard below, Alita takes an Imaginos trigger given by Nova and sacrificed herself to secure the Sky Hook by fusing with it. Nova immediately regrets giving Alita the trigger, as he cannot bear being saved by her selflessness, and goes completely mad. Five years later, Kiyomi and Figure encounters a senile, insane Nova, who lures them in to a cavern deep in Ketheres, where they find Alita reborn from the Tree of Life with a human body.

=== Last Order ===
The original ending of Battle Angel Alita is retconned in Last Order, where Alita wakes up in the new Imaginos Body only to find Nova has died a week earlier. A pre-recorded video message then reveals that Nova exposed the brain bio-chip conspiracy to the Tipharean population, resulting in mass insanity quickly spreading and devastating the floating metropolis, culminating in a chaotic two-week civil war. His assistant Roscoe also goes crazy and kills Nova, disembowelling him and looting his two brain bio-chips, which later fall into Alita's hands. However, it is later revealed that Nova has already invented the Stereotomy process, which allows him to create reincarnations of himself, making him effectively an immortal presence. Going into space with new and old companions alike, to look for her lost friend Lou Collins and to find out more about her forgotten past, Alita is caught up in an interplanetary struggle between the major powers of the colonized solar system. Along the way, she forms an alliance with three of the Alita Replicas who have now begun to think for themselves, an unsavory superhacker, and Nova himself when she enters the Zenith of Things Tournament (Z.O.T.T.), a fighting competition held every ten years. Later on, Super Nova (one of reborn versions of Nova) reveals that the Alita in the story is actually a replica android with a brain bio-chip that contains the same memories and combat abilities, while her original organic brain is actually sealed inside a box that she was tasked to safeguard the whole time. When the android Alita was revived by Melchizedek, she chooses to let her organic brain be reborn into a genetically reconstructed organic body and live a normal peaceful human life with Figure Four, while the android Alita goes on to discover her past life and explore her new destiny.

=== Mars Chronicle ===
Three years after the 10th ZOTT, Alita visits Mars to honor the slaughtered inhabitants of the orphanage she lived at during childhood. At the Mariama memorial site, she re-encounters her childhood friend and fellow Künstler Erica, who became an undead Necro-Soldier – the infamous assassin known as "Frau X" – and is immediately drawn into a Martian power struggle. Determined to save her childhood companion from the control of the Einherjar, Alita vows to unveil the truth and discover the cure for Necro-Soldiers.

== Appearances ==
=== In anime ===
In the 1993 OVA Battle Angel, Gally (known as Alita in the Manga Entertainment UK and European releases) is immediately given a variant of the Berserker Body after being discovered by Ido. She is voiced by Miki Itō in the Japanese version, Amanda Winn-Lee in the ADV Films dub, and Larissa Murray in the Manga UK dub.

=== In video game ===
Gally is the main character in the 1998 Sony PlayStation video game Gunnm: Martian Memory.

=== In film ===
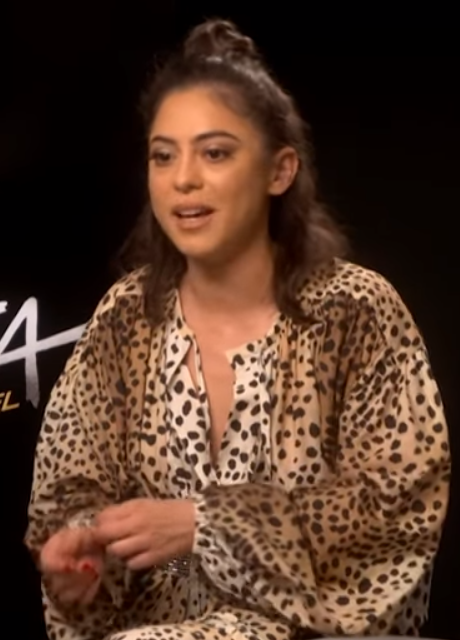
Rosa Salazar portrayed Alita in the 2019 live-action film.

Rosa Salazar portrays Alita through performance capture in the 2019 live-action adaptation Alita: Battle Angel, produced and co-written by James Cameron and directed by Robert Rodriguez. Alita's design was noted for retaining the big eyes of the manga's art, which Rodriguez stated was an intent to "bring a true manga and anime character to life." In the film, she is given the name Alita by Dr. Dyson Ido (played by Christoph Waltz) after his late daughter, as well as given a cyborg body that was originally meant for said daughter. While traveling with Hugo (played by Keean Johnson) and his friends to a ruined Martian warship, Alita acquires a highly advanced Berserker body and brings it home, but Ido refuses to transplant her into it, fearing the consequences of combining lost Martian technology will trigger her instinct for conflicts. However, after her body is destroyed by the giant cyborg killer Grewishka (played by Jackie Earle Haley), Ido proceeds to transplant her into the Berserker body, which brought back more of her lost memories.
