= List of Battle Angel Alita: Mars Chronicle characters =

The following is a list of characters from the Battle Angel Alita: Mars Chronicle manga by Yukito Kishiro, and comprises two separate timelines more than 200 years apart. Most of the characters in the ES 594 (current) timeline have previously appeared in Battle Angel Alita: Last Order, while almost all the characters who appear in the ES 373 (past memory) timeline are newly introduced.

== Present timeline ==
=== Main characters ===
==== Alita / Yoko ====
Three years after the 10th ZOTT, Alita visits Mars to honor the slaughtered inhabitants of the orphanage she lived at during childhood. At the Mamiana memorial site, she re-encounters her childhood friend and fellow Künstler Erica, who became an undead Necro-Soldier — the infamous terrorist assassin known as "Frau X" — and is immediately drawn into a Martian power struggle. Determined to save her childhood companion from the control of the Einherjar, Alita vows to unveil the truth and discover the cure for Necro-Soldiers.

==== Erica ====
Erica Wald (エーリカ・ヴァルト, Ērika Varuto), also known as Frau X (フラウ・X, Furau Ikusu; German for "Woman X"), is a surviving Künstler and a member of the Einherjar, and has a tendency to use German words in her speech. She was Yoko's closest childhood friend and a de facto older sister, as both girls were orphaned during the chaotic Martian wars and relied on each other for survival. They were subsequently recruited together into Grünthal to be trained as Künstlers. Erica was more confident, proactive and outgoing than Yoko, and Tzykrow also mentions that Yoko used to cling to Erica and only really became effective because of his training in the Kammer Gruppe.

Though hinted at the beginning of Last Order in Alita's memory, Erica does not appear until later during Operation Hagel, where Captain Zazie and her troops were attacked by an unknown female Panzer Kunst user who single-handedly wiped out two elite squads of the LADDER-Mars-Venusian allied forces and almost killed Zazie. Because this assailant was so fast that Zazie couldn't even see her face, she was only reported as "Frau X". The true identity of "Frau X" as Erica is not definitively confirmed until the events of Mars Chronicle, where her backstory is further explored.

Erica was born sometime between ES 362 and ES 370 in Curie Stadt in central-southern Cydonia. As a child, Erica was abused by her deranged parents and lost her left eye and left hand as a result. To cope with these childhood trauma, Erica developed a kind of dissociative personality that causes her to repress as well as confabulate some of her memories. For a long time, she believed her family to be happy and loving (a false memory generated from a "Happy family, happy life" billboard opposite her bedroom window), but in reality she was chiefly responsible for her parents' murder at the hands of armed burglars. After months of wandering as an orphan, she encountered the young cyborg Yoko, towards whom she was very kind, sisterly and protective, at one point volunteering to accompany Yoko across a minefield while under the gunpoint of Martian soldiers. However, after her suppressed dark side was awakened and cultivated by the villain Baron Muster, she later became a cruel and sadistic person out of personally bitterness and jealousy. After being trained by Grünthal, she became an embodiment of the Künstler fighting ethic in its prime, that of a ruthless and brutally efficient warrior. The last time Erica and Yoko saw each other was during the Terraforming Wars just prior to Operation Maulwurf, where during a sparring Yoko was severely beaten and Erica died from her injuries. Their trainer Master Gregt resurrected Erica as a Necro-Soldier (屍人兵士, Nekuro Sorujā), though Erica is not aware of this.

Alita and Erica met again in ES 594 when Alita returns to Mars to visit the memorial site of Mamiana, the town of their childhood orphanage that was massacred during the war. After a little discussion about her role in the Neo-Third Reich Division, Erica commenced a fight with Alita, demonstrating her formidable abilities and initially dominated the battle, forcing Alita to sacrifice an arm. Alita later turned the tables against Erica, forcing her to amputate a foot to get away, before their fight was interrupted by the arrival of the other Einherjar. This encounter makes Alita determined to find a cure for the Necro-Soldiers and take Erica back from the Einherjar, and eventually resorts to seek help from an unlikely individual. Meanwhile, at the Einherjar headquarters, Erica furiously confronts Gergt regarding Alita's accusations and is devastated to learn that she is indeed a Necro-Soldier, having been mortally-wounded by Yoko 200 years ago. Revealing that he is also a Necro-Soldier, Gregt states that Caerula had been prying into their affairs and that he had managed to temporarily stall her, then berates Erica for questioning their mission.

==== Danko ====
Also known as the "Berserker Gun", Danko (ダンコ) is a talking Venusian nanobiotic weapons system consisting a jawed serpent-like creature (similar in appearance to a Chestburster from Alien, but with a large mono-eye) and an omnidirectional high-power gun attached to its back. A sentient artificial intelligence created from Berserker Cells, it acts as an early warning and ranged weapon supporting unit to Alita, anchoring itself by wrapping onto her right shoulder. As Alita's travel companion, its precise origin is currently unknown, but it is revealed that Alita picked it up at some point during the three-year timeskip between Last Order and Mars Chronicle when she was working as a Last Order agent on Venus.

Danko possesses dexterous digits with which it discharges its guided nanotech bullets, which are projectiles spliced with a mix of Berserker cells/organic Collapser. These slugs are sure-kill shots which destroy targets on a biomolecular level, remotely guided by the mechanoid itself to hit from odd angles, but can be deflected as they're slower than a railgun.

==== Super Nova ====
Desty Nova's evil reincarnation makes a surprising reappearance, when Priesterin Mui suggests Alita to visit a scientist whom she knows to possess the knowledge to discover a cure for the Necro-Soldiers and hence take Erica back from the Einherjar. When Mui's ship arrives at the scientist's laboratory, Alita recognizes the person coming out to greet them as Tzykrow, and they immediately start attacking each other. After Alita easily defeats Tzykrow, Super Nova emerges from the laboratory to greet Alita and remarks that the fact she didn't attack him on sight means she must have learned restraint, before inviting Mui and Alita into his lab. Inside, Alita asks if Super Nova can restore a Necro-Soldier to a living being, saying she won't take no for an answer; and Super Nova gleefully agrees to help.

=== Einherjar ===
==== Gergt ====
Gergt (ゲルクト, Gerukuto) is surviving Künstler and the leader of the Einherjar (英霊団, Einheruyaru). He was Yoko's former training master, and was responsible for reviving Erica as a Necro-Soldier after her fatal sparring match with Yoko 200 years prior. He was watching from the shadows during the 10th ZOTT, expecting Alita to be killed by Caerula Sanguis in combat so he can also revive her as a pawn, but was surprised when Caerula deliberately lost to Alita and entrusted her the Fata Morgana. When Erica angrily confronts him regarding Alita's accusations of her being a Necro-Soldier, Gergt coldly tells her the truth and reveals that he is also a Necro-Soldier. Gregt then states that Caerula had been prying into their affairs and that he had managed to temporarily stall her, then berates Erica for questioning their mission.

==== Parabellum ====
Parabellum (パラベラム, Paraberamu) is a surviving Künstler, who is later revealed to be a Necro-Soldier.

==== Bremen ====
Breman (ブレーメン, Burēmen) is a surviving Künstler and a "War Professor", who is later revealed to be a Necro-Soldier.

=== Mars Canopy Association ===
==== Mui ====
Mui (ムイ) is a Priesterin (大巫女, Purisuterin; "priestess" in German) of the Mars Baldachin Verein (天蓋協会, Tengai Kyōkai; MBV for short, "Mars Canopy Association" in German), a celestial organization responsible for building, maintenance and repair of the Baldachin (the atmospheric canopy that domes over the inhabited Martian surface), as well as surveying and keeping records of events on Mars. Mui had encountered Alita two centuries ago, when she was only a Gärtner (庭師, Gerutonā; "gardener" in German) in charge of the Säule pillars (which supports the atmospheric canopy) and the latter was still the 3-year-old cyborg girl Yoko. In ES 373, when a segment of the Baldachin ruptured and later collapsed due to sabotage by warlords, Dr. Finch's vehicle carrying Yoko and Erica narrowly escaped being crushed by the fallen canopy, but was trapped beneath a huge rock. Mui rescued them with her shuttlecraft Beine 244, before demanding one of them to be sacrifice to biomolecularly regenerate the Säule. Because Finch was old (and hence had short telomeres, making him useless) and Yoko was over 80% mechanical, Mui demanded Erica to be sacrificed, and gagged Finch when he protested. Erica agreed to be the sacrifice, on the condition that Finch got released and Yoko also joined her as a companion sacrifice so they could be forever together. Before Mui could proceed with the sacrifice, her superior Priesterin Naef intervened and ordered her to release them at once, citing the "Thirteenth Orakel" that the Säule quantumancy prophesied the arrival of a child with the "sign of change", who would be one (or both) of Yoko and Erica if they could survive and overcome the many terrible trials in life and change the world.

In ES 594, when Alita was accused by Zazie of assassinating Queen Limeira and being held prisoner for interrogation, Mui intervened despite the MBV's traditional policy of non-interference and demanded the Mars Kingdom Parliament to release her immediately, offering to provide a Säule network record to clear Alita's name. To everyone's surprise, Limeira herself then arrived and agreed to Mui's request. Mui also revealed that her actual body was already a part of the Säule network, and she was only appearing in a ceremonial avatar. Taking over the custody of Alita, Mui was initially distraught that Alita displayed no trust of her, mainly due to their previous history and Mui's rather peculiar personality. When Alita claimed wanting to find a cure of Necro-Soldier to take Erica back from the Einherjar, Mui told her that the MBV did not have the expertise in such areas, but offered to seek help from a "very talented doctor" she knew. When they arrived at the destination, Mui was very surprised to find out that Alita knew the doctor she was referring to — being none other than Alita's ambiguous archenemy Super Nova. After Mui voiced her support for Alita's request, Super Nova agreed to help them.

== Past timeline ==
=== Muster's gang ===
==== Baron Muster ====
Itall Sonann (イタル・ソナン, Itaru Sonan), later known by the pseudonym Baron Muster (バロン・ムスター, Baron Musutā), is a self-described villain and the mysterious leader of a notorious criminal enterprise running rampant over multiple Martian provinces between the years ES 363 to 374, and was famous for petrifying his victims into crystallized statues using a poison called Krista Morten (結晶化毒, Kurisutamoruten) that is activated by ultrasonic signals. Through his sister Nollin, Itall is the "uncle" (genetics-wise, actually brother) of Yoko.

When he was younger, Itall was a spirited, kind-hearted young man who aspired to be a poet/minnesanger. While working excavation for his scholar father Krucht at the Merli Jota Ruins with his younger sister Nollin, Itall befriended a sulky, foul-mouthed southern drifter-laborer named Johan Wald. He was also secretly infatuated with the sponsor of the excavation, Crown Princess Kagura Dornburg of Cydonia. When Kagura came to inspect the unsealing of an artifact cane called Goldstock (黄金杖, Gorutoshutokku), Itall was the person who pried open the box and retrieved the artifact, and was exposed to a fine sweet dust from the box along with the other six people at the scene. After he handed the Goldstock to Kagura, who immediately left and ordered him to gather all the crews there for rewards, Itall received an urgent call from Johan warning that Kagura was planning to bury everyone alive. An explosion then ensued, and in the shock and confusion Itall found his sister Nollin unconscious from blast injury, as he and other survivors desperately searching for exit. When they made it outside, Johan was already having a gunfight with Kagura's bodyguards and managed to hijack Kagura's transport using her chamberlain Policella as a hostage. Only seven people from the excavation team escaped alive, but Nollin was bleeding out and could not be taken to a hospital due to the survivors being now wanted fugitives. Despite Johan's objection, Itall and the others chose to surrender after Policella promised them a pardon. Johan then asked to speak to Itall alone and told Itall to blame everything on him. Before he left to flee, Johan gave Itall the Goldstock and told him to hide it in a secret place as an insurance against the worst-case scenario of Kagura not honoring the pardon. Itall complied and hid the Goldstock in a water purification plant before surrendering to authority.

After he surrendered, Itall was subjected to interrogations but could not bring himself to blame Johan for everything, instead choosing to speak the truth about what happened at the excavation. This resulted in Policella immediately revoking any promised pardon and subjecting Itall to solitary confinement. With no knowledge of the well-being of his father and sister, Itall grew increasingly agitated and was shocked to discover an eye beginning to grow out of his shoulder. It was then revealed that everyone present at the Goldstock unsealing had contracted a strange condition that causes face-like teratomatous growths all over their bodies, which recurred stubbornly even after extensive resections. The treating surgeon, Dr. Ngema Neubauer, then coined the condition as "Maske Tumor" (人面腫, Masuketōma) and began to use the survivors as guinea pigs to conduct unethical human experimentations. Itall, while enduring horrific procedures himself, had to witness his father being eventually vivisected to death. When the other survivors (except Nollin, whom Itall had not seen since surrendering) were also sacrificed in the experiments over the next few months, Itall lost his mind and began to reject reality. He was then retrained prone in a room for a "final experiment", to be supervised by none other than Kagura herself. Despite the revelation, Itall's rage all but disappeared when he saw Kagura (as he was still hopelessly in love with her), and he resorted to begging for salvation. Disgusted, Kagura left and asked Policella to perform the torture, who rubbed erosive hydrofluoric acid on Itall's legs to inflict intense pain so his semen can be harvested as fertilizer to cultivate Kagura's pet mandrakes. When Itall apparently died from the torture, Policella ordered his body disposed by incineration. However, Itall didn't die and woke up from the coma in the crematory, where a disguised Johan killed the cremator and rescued him out of Kagura's castle. The horribly disfigured Itall then spent several months recovering under Johan's care, who also told him that Kagura was now queen of Cydonia after the previous archduke suddenly died. After finally being able to walk with mechanical limbs (his legs were melted by the acid torture), Johan asked him to retrieve the Goldstock. When Itall did so, Johan suddenly shot him three times (twice in the torso, once in the right eye) with a shotgun. Shocked that his trusted friend betrayed him, Itall refused to let go of the Goldstock and apparently fell to his death down the cistern with it, much to Johan's dismay.

Somehow, Itall managed to survived death a second time (presumably because his tumors took the brunt of the gunshots), but his former virtuous soul never returned. Full of resentment towards the world, he decided that the horrible things that happened to him were not punishments for his past deeds, but for his future crimes, and the only way to justify the suffering was to become an evil man worthy of such punishments. After he recovered, he established a corpse-recycling conglomerate that turned dead bodies into construction materials using the Krista Morten poison, and used that to fund his criminal activities. At this point he adopted the infamous pseudonym "Baron Muster" and gathered a gang of henchmen, and began to use Krista Morten to murder and pillage, operating out of a mobile castle hidden near the border between Cydonia and Xantha to terrorize various parts of Mars. Muster also developed an antidote using his own cancer cells to temporarily inhibit his Maske Tumors, so he could live long enough to exact his vengeance upon Kagura. Several years later, when Muster heard about a Maske Tumor victim being paraded at a Sklodowska Carnival sideshow, he grew curious and decided to see it himself. At the show, he recognized the "extremely hideous living monster" on display as his previously-presumed-dead sister Nollin, who was severely mutilated from years of torture. Muster then silently killed everyone at the show, and euthanized Nollin to relieve her of suffering. He then tracked down Dr. Ngema, who was in hiding doing Maske Tumor research, and murdered the latter's entire family. When Muster confronted Ngema at his lab, he was shocked to find a newborn cyborg girl, who was revealed to originate from a Maske Tumor resected from Nollin. When Ngema confessed to have told nobody else, Muster killed him in an "unspeakable" fashion. Muster then took the young girl, who he named Yoko, to be secretly raised in Flammarion, and falsified Yoko's birth record as deriving from Kagura. He also formed an alliance with Kagura's uncle and political enemy, Marquis Maruki Baumburg, with whom he conspired to use Yoko to usurp Kagura's throne.

In 373 ES, Muster intruded the 12th Council of Edom and openly killed Policella Porwit, and coerced the other lords to strip away Cydonia's sharing rights to the Tiida Kagan orbital solar mirrors in order to use a harsh winter to rile up public resentment against Kagura. On his way back, he intercepted a trio of bounty hunters hired by Policella to hunt down Yoko, and picked up young Erica, who he knew was the daughter of Johan Wald and was in possession of Vom Kriege Vol. 2, the companion artifact of the Goldstock, needed to find the Secret Treasure of Mars. However a gunshot from the bounty hunter Das punctured the fuel tank of his transport, and they crash-landed in the wasteland and fell into a buried spaceship. After learning that Erica was responsible for her father's murder, Muster was impressed and decided to take her in as an apprentice. Erica then helped Muster to decipher the location of the Secret Treasure at the northern polar region of Acidalia Planitia, and eventually find the treasure, which was revealed to be a large optical disc which Muster wrongly assumed to contain the Immortal Medicine (不滅の秘薬, Horobizu no Kusuri) that could cure his tumor.

In 374 ES, Muster visited the Baumburg mansion and met up in person with Maruki for the first time. Erica eavesdropped and heard them planning to kill Yoko and her (fake) mother Kyoko after their plan succeeded, so she planned an escape and hired two of the bounty hunter trio, Das and Rocco, to escort them away. However, they were intercepted by the third (and strongest) bounty hunter from the trio, Giratin, who was hired by Maruki, and both Das and Rocco were killed in combat. When Maruki and Muster caught up with the girls, they were told that Kyoko was responsible for hiring the bounty hunters and committed suicide when the escape plan failed. Muster inspected the body and realized the wound not being self-inflicited, so he immediately suspected Erica, but chose to say nothing at all. When Maruki later staged a succession ritual to pass Kagura's throne to Yoko, Muster sabotaged the ritual and ordered his henchwoman Zoe (disguised as him) to kill all the noblemen at the scene (Maruki included) and threw the bedridden Kagura into the Ethnarch Odeon Bach. In the Odeon Bach, Muster deliberately chained himself half suspended in the air, and revealed himself as Itall and taunted Kagura to lash him with whip. It turned out that the Secret Treasure of Mars did not contain the cure Muster had hoped for, so he decided to exact his final revenge — using Kagura's sadistic emotion to activate the Odeon Bach into berserk mode. He then triggered a rig to pour hydrofluoric acid over himself and Kagura to kill her along with himself. The berserking Odeon Bach then proceeded to autonomously demolish the capital city, killing thousands. Erica witnessed this happening and claimed that even though she hated Muster, she really respected his dedication to hate and applauded his successful revenge.

==== Zoe ====
Zoe (ゾーイ, Zōi) is Baron Muster's loyal bodyguard and right-hand woman. An athletic woman with lean muscles, scars covering her body and a tattoo over her left eye who wears a beanie and typically a trench coat or a black tanktop while training, Zoe served as Erica's trainer and was verbally abusive and often threatening to harm her. Even though Muster was frequently physically abusive towards her, she appears to have deep love and respect for him.

==== Damjan ====
Prisoner of Baron Muster, claiming to search for his missing girlfriend, later revealed to be a mole sent to spy on Muster while he searched for the Secret Treasure of Mars. He tried to eliminate Muster's gang and take the treasure when they found it, but was killed when Muster tricked him into using the Krista Morten poison on himself.

=== Civilians ===
==== Dr. Finch ====
Finch (フィンチ, Finchi) is an elderly medic who travels from town to town. After Yoko and Erica were saved by a group of passing Künstlers returning from a mission in Maggini Stadt, they were handed over to Finch, who took a special effort to care for the girls because he lost his young daughter to sickness while too busy with work and regretted that ever since. Due to work schedules, he left them to the all-girl orphanage at the town of Mamiana (マミアナ, Mamiana) near the border between Cydonia and Flammarion. During the few days that he was away, he got drunk and returned to Mamiana half a day late, only to find the town massacred and destroyed. Struck down with guilt, he was rejoiced to find Yoko and Erica alive, who were spared by the Pagagei Corps only for propaganda purposes.

While driving the girls to Cydonia, an explosion in the Martian Baldachin (gigantic canopies that maintain the artificial atmosphere) breached the killed all the refugees on the highway and causes Baldachin to fall down and crush everything beneath. Finch, Yoko and Erica were saved by Mui, a Gartner (German: "gardener") of Beine 244 from the Mars Baldachin Verein (MBV for abbreviation, meaning "Mars Canopy Association" in German), who detained them all and demanded one of them to be used as a DNA sacrifice to reconstruct the Saule (giant pillars that supports the canopy that maintains the artificial atmosphere). Finch pleaded for the girls to be released, but was restrained and gagged. Because Finch was old and Yoko was almost full cyborg, Erica was selected to be sacrificed, and she asked to have Yoko as a sacrifice companion. The girls then demanded Finch to be released and bid him a thankful farewell, while Finch could only watch silently in tears. However, the MBV's Priesterin Naef intervened and ordered Mui to release them all, as the Thirteenth Orakel cited that one (or both) of the girls would become the prophesied child with the "sign of change".

After being released from MBV, Finch took the girls to Curie Stadt, where he found out about Erica tragic childhood at the hands of her abusive parents. He was then contacted via the mayor by a woman who claimed to be Yoko's mother, and handed over Yoko's care to her. After taking Erica with him and leaving Curie, they were intercepted by three bounty hunters named Das, Rocco and Giratin, who were hired to track down Yoko. The bounty hunters destroyed Finch's ambulance, but were stopped by the arrival of Baron Muster, who told them that their previous employer was dead and left with Erica hopping onto his transport. Hearing their bounty was now null, the bounty hunters left immediately, leaving Finch alone in the wild with the wreckage of his vehicle. The girls never met Finch again after that, and they both remembered him with respect and appreciation, and often opted to eat Bemite bread (which Finch made them eat for nutrition) even though they both found it absolutely disgusting.

==== Kyoko Bima ====
Kyoko Bima (キョーコ・ビマ, Kyōko Bima) is an ordinary woman from a shanty town at the base of a Martian Säule. In her younger days she lived a passive, mediocre life, and was married with a child, but for unexplained reasons both her husband and child died. In grieving she had given up on life, until Marquis Maruki chose to hire her to pose as Yoko's mother (due to her likeness in looks) in order to keep Yoko under custody for his conspiracy against Queen Kagura. When Dr. Finch brings Yoko and Erica to Erica's hometown Curie Stadt, Kyoko contacts them via the mayor, and with a made-up story about Yoko having to undergo cyberization shortly after birth due to illness and she losing track of Yoko after being injured when the hospital was bombed, convinces Finch to hand over Yoko in her care after citing Yoko's scarf as proof. Over the next year, Kyoko is responsible for watching Yoko in the Baumburg mansion in the Cydonian capital Sklodowska. However, she is moved by Yoko's cute, naive innocence, and gradually develops a maternal bond and genuinely cares for Yoko's well-being, and is as close to a real mother as Yoko ever had in her childhood.

When Baron Muster arrives at the Baumburg house to discuss their plan to overthrow Kagura, Erica (who has now become Muster's apprentice) finds and reunites with Yoko, with Kyoko affectionately promising to be mother to both girls. While playing hide-and-seek with Yoko, Erica drags Kyoko into a private conversation and calls out her fake identity, forcing Kyoko to beg not to tell Yoko and agrees to obey everything Erica orders. Erica then reveals that Muster and Maruki plans to have both Kyoko and Yoko killed after their plan succeeds, and tells them to escape. She then leads them to two bounty hunters Dass and Rocco, who she hired for protection, and flees the mansion with Maruki's men in hot pursuit. After Dass and Rocco are both killed, Erica decides to blame Kyoko as the fall person and stabs Kyoko in the heart. Before succumbing to her injury, she confesses to Yoko about her life story, and claims she really loved both girls despite what Erica has done. Later Muster notices that Kyoko's knife wound is not self-inflicted and immediately suspects Erica, but decides to say nothing instead. When Muster and Maruki's convoy leave, Kyoko's dead body is left out in the snow, with Yoko tearfully rebuffing Erica's taunt that Kyoko is an impostor.

==== Nollin Sonann ====
Nollin Sonann (ノリン・ソナン, Norin Sonan) was the younger sister of Itall Sonann, and Yoko's true "mother" (genetic progenitor, since Yoko is technically her clone). Nollin worked with her scholar father and brother in the excavation at the Merli Jota Ruins (also known as the "Face Rock") in northwestern Cydonia. When their team dug up a box, Princess Kagura Dornburg came for an inspection later that day to witness the unsealing. After Itall retrieved the Goldstock inside the box, Kagura left with the artifact and immediately ordered her bodyguards to blow up the cave and kill all the excavation team members. The Sonanns barely survived the explosion, and only escaped because Itall's friend Johan Wald held Kagura's chamberlain Policella Porwit hostage and hijacked Kagura's transport after a gunfight. Nollin was critically injured in the explosion and bleeding out, and the survivors were eventually forced to surrender to get her medical help after being promised amnesty. After their surrender, it was found that everyone present at the unsealing of Goldstock had contracted a strange form of cancer, which the treating Dr. Ngema coined "Maske Tumor". The survivors were then subjected to horrific live experimentation. Because Itall never saw Nollin again, he assumed she died of the experiments like the others. In reality, Nollin survived her blast injury but was kept imprisoned and subjected to years of torture for Kagura's enjoyment.

After Itall survived torture and near-death twice and became the infamous serial murderer Baron Muster, he heard about a Maske Tumor subject appearing in a Sklodowska Carnival sideshow. At the sideshow, he recognized the "extremely hideous living monster" on display as a mutilated Nollin, who had her tongue cut, eyes and ears crushed, arms and legs severed, and scars indicating torture all throughout her body. Muster then had his henchmen blockade the tent and silently killed all the troupe members and spectators. He then euthanized his sister by disintegrating her with the experimental Sabulum Morten — Muster's henchwoman Zoe claims that was the first time she saw him cry. Muster then tracked down Dr. Ngema and murder his entire family (including the pet cat), but Ngema was indifferent and proudly presented the fruit of his research – an infant cyborg girl coded HK-BR035, whom he claimed was the first case of a resected Maske Tumor developing a healthy brain after being grafted into an artificial body. He then revealed the origin source being from Nollin, whom he gave to the sideshow after finish using her. When Muster learned that Ngema told nobody else, he killed the doctor in a way "better left unsaid", according to Zoe.

==== Krucht Sonann ====
Professor Krucht Sonann (クルヒト・ソナン, Kuruhito Sonan) was a renowned Cydonian archaeologist and is the father of Itall and Nollin Sonann, and hence the "grandfather" (genetically the father) of Yoko. Just prior to the Northern Expeditions wars broke out, he led an excavation mission at the Merli Jota Ruins funded by Princess Kagura Dornburg, and successfully discovered the ancient relic Goldstock. After witnessing the unsealing and receiving the artifact, Kagura secretly ordered her body guards to bury the excavation crew alive by blowing up the cave. The Sonanns survived the explosion and managed to escape. However, Krucht's daughter Nollin was gravely injured, and eventually Krucht and Itall decided to surrender to the authority in order to save Nollin. Afterwards, it was discovered that almost all the survivors had contracted a strange disease called Maske Tumor. Krucht and the others were subjected to multiple resections and later vivisections, and eventually died of the inhuman experiments.

==== Johan Wald ====
Johan Wald (ヨハン・ヴァルト, Yohan Varuto) is Erica's father. He was previously a soldier from a southern warlord's army, but deserted after supposedly killing a superior officer after having an affair with the latter's consort Marita (although the truthfulness of this account might be in question due to Johan's notoriety of being a repeated liar). After desertion he became a drifter until finding work in ES 360 as a laborer with Krucht Sonann's excavation team at the Merli Jota Ruins, where he became an uneasy friend with an idealistic Itall Sonann. On the day of the discovery of the Goldstock, the team's sponsor Princess Kagura Dormburg came with an envoy to inspect the unsealing. Johan stayed outside and (being an ex-military) seeing that Kagura's bodyguards were carrying explosives, immediately recognized foul play and called Itall to warn about Kagura's sinister motive. When the caves were blown up, Johan engaged in an intense gunfight outside with Kagura's men, managed to hijack Kagura's personal transport by kidnapping her chamberlain Policella (who was carrying both the Goldstock and the Vom Kriege book for Kagura) as a hostage, and allowed the surviving excavation crews (the Sonanns and three other workers) to escape. However, the survivors then faced the dilemma that they were hunted as fugitives and Itall's sister Nollin was gravely injured and desperately in need for medical treatment. When the group opted to surrender due to Policella's (false) promise of amnesty, Johan was doggedly against it and chose to flee. Before he left, he told Itall to name him the fall guy and lay all the blame on him. He then took the Vom Kriege book and gave the Goldstock to Itall, telling him to hide it separately as a leverage in the worst-case scenario of Kagura not honoring the pardon.

After fleeing, Johan hid the Vom Kriege in a dried up well, only to return after evading a storm to find a giant building being constructed on top of where he hid the book. Several months later, Johan snuck into the Dornburg castle and rescued a tortured Itall from being cremated alive, and after further several months of hiding, managed to rehabilitate Itall with mechanical limbs. He then asked Itall to retrieve the hidden Goldstock, before betraying the latter by shooting him three times with a shotgun. However, the critically wounded Itall refused to let go of the Goldstock and fell down the water treatment facility with it, much to Johan's dismay.

Johan spent the following years digging and somehow managed to retrieve the Vom Kriege book. At some point he reunited with Marita and settled in Curie Stadt where they had a daughter named Erica. Bitter about losing the Goldstock, Johan became a loud-mouthed drunk and a grave robber, while Marita worked as a prostitute. Both of them were deranged and extremely abusive towards Erica; at one point Johan ordered the family dog Hershey to bite off half of Erica's left forearm, and Marita poked a fork into Erica's left eye for "looking the wrong way". However, Johan's drunken bragging about his "treasure" at the local bar caught the attention of a pair of burglars in ES 373, whom Erica overheard talking about wanting to rob Johan. Resentful of what her parents did to her, Erica deliberately led the burglars to her home, tied up Johan's gun when he was asleep and revealed where the book was hidden. When Johan woke up at gunpoint and found out his abused daughter had betrayed him, he furiously dashed towards Erica only to be shot dead by the robbers. The burglars then also shot and critically wounded Marita, before leaving disappointed that the so-called treasure was merely an old book (the value of which they didn't recognize). When the burglars left, Erica walked to her badly injured mother (who was now begging Erica to find a doctor) and sadistically poured alcohol over her before burning the entire house down with her parents' bodies inside, and then hid the Vom Kriege under a billboard across the street from her house.

=== Bounty hunters ===
==== Das ====
Das (ダス, Dasu)

==== Rocco ====
Rocco (ロッコ, Rokko)

==== Giratin ====
Giratin (ギラティン, Giratin)

=== Cydonia ===
==== Kagura Dornburg ====
Kagura Dornburg (カグラ・ドルンブルク, Kagura Dorunburuku) was the ruling lord of Cydonia during the final years of the Era of the Eighteen Archdukes. Renowned for her beauty and praised as the "Rose of Mars", Kagura was very ambitious and also manipulative, ruthless and sadistic, and secretly enjoyed torturing prisoners.

Twelve years prior to Yoko's birth, Kagura funded Krucht Sonann's excavation dig at the Merli Jota Ruins to uncovered the artifact Goldstock — one of the two keys to finding the Secret Treasure of Mars (火星の秘宝, Kasei no Hihō), the other key being a special copy of the book Vom Kriege Vol. 2 possessed by the Dornburg family. When Krucht's son Itall (who was secretly infatuated with Kagura) retrieved the artifact and handed it to Kagura, she immediately left and attempted to bury alive the entire excavation team using explosives. The Sonanns survived the cave collapse and managed to escape after Itall's friend Johan Wald hijacked Kagura's transport using her chamberlain Policella as a hostage. Because Itall's sister Nollin was gravely injured during the blast and couldn't be brought to a hospital due to Kagura issuing a nationwide arrest warrant on the Sonanns, they were eventually forced to surrender to the authorities. Afterwards, it was discovered that everyone present during the Goldstock unsealing was exposed to a mysterious substance that triggers the growth of a strangely aggressive teratoma all over the body. Also infected, Kagura ordered Dr. Ngema Neubauer to conduct inhuman experiments on the Sonanns and the other survivors, and personally tortured Itall with hydrofluoric acid in order to harvest his semen to nourish her pet mandrakes. When Itall apparently died of the torment, Kagura ordered him disposed by incineration. Several months later, the ruling Cydonian Archduke suddenly died (it was rumored that Kagura poisoned her lord father) and Kagura inherited the throne as queen and held the control of the Odeon Bach, Cydonia's Ethnarch (giant robotic superweapon). It was later revealed that Kagura also kept Nollin (who survived her blast injuries) imprisoned and tortured her for fun.

However, Ngema's research failed to yield any cure for Kagura's tumor, and she grew impatient and threatened to kill him on multiple occasions, resulting in Ngema running away from her laboratory. As her disease progressed, Kagura became grotesquely disfigured and bedridden, and was forced to hide from public view, leaving her unable to stop her uncle Maruki's scheme after the death of her secretary Policella. Later on, Maruki staged an abdication ceremony to pass Kagura's throne to the 4-year-old cyborg girl Yoko, who was said to be Kagura's genetic heir. However, the chief priest hosting the ceremony suddenly announced that Yoko is genetically unrelated to Kagura, and revealed himself to be Baron Muster (actually Muster's henchwoman Zoe in disguise), who then killed all the noblemen (including Maruki) and threw Kagura into the Odeon Bach. Inside the Ethnarch, Kagura encounters a chained Muster, who revealed himself to be a survived Itall Sonann and provokes Kagura to whip him. By inciting Kagura's sadistic lust, the Odeon Bach was activated into berserk mode (which Kagura could not shut down due to neural interference from her tumors) and proceeded to devastate the capital. When Kagura attempted to throttle Itall, a trap pre-prepared by Itall poured hydrofluoric acid and melted them both. After her death, the Cydonian Archduchy collapsed, triggering a domino effect that quickly spread to surrounding regions and lead to the end of the Era of the Eighteen Archdukes and the start of the chaotic Warlord Era.

==== Maruki Baumburg ====
Marquis Maruki Baumburg (マルキ・バウムブルク, Maruki Baumuburuku) was the head of the Baumburg family, a noble retainer branch to the Dornburg family based around the Cydonian capital Sklodowska. Despite being Queen Kagura's uncle, Marquis Maruki was her political enemy, who desires to obtain lordship and control of Cydonia's Ethnarch. He made secret alliance with Baron Muster due to their shared hatred towards Kagura, and conspired to use Yoko (who was falsely reported to be a genetic product of Kagura) to obtain control of the throne. For this scheme, he chose and hired a woman named Kyoko Bima from a refugee camp to pose as Yoko's mother in order to keep the girl under custody. He later staged a succession ceremony to pass Kagura's throne to Yoko, but was double-crossed by Muster and killed by Muster's henchwoman Zoe.

==== Policella Porwit ====
Policella Porwit (ポリセラ・ポルヴィット, Porisera Poruvitto) was Kagura Dornburg's right-hand woman, who served as her chamberlain during Kagura's princess years and became her secretary after Kagura's ascension to the Cydonian throne. She participated in Kagura's conspiracy to murder the Merli Jota Ruins excavation crews after they uncovered the Goldstock for her, but was caught by Johan Wald as a hostage (while carrying both the Goldstock and the Vom Kriege book) to allow the Sonanns to escape. She later gave a false promise of amnesty to the Sonanns and convinced them to surrender, and took part in torturing Itall Sonann with hydrofluoric acid to harvest his semen for Kagura's mandrakes, and ordered the body to be incinerated when Itall reportedly died from the torment.

Years later, Policella found out that Kagura's uncle Marquis Maruki Baumburg was secretly harbouring a plan to overthrow Kagura by using a cyborg girl hidden in the Flammarion province named Yoko, so she hired the bounty hunter trio Giratin, Daz and Rocco to hunt down Yoko. She later represented the bedridden Kagura in the 12th Council of Edom to negotiate the sharing rights to the Tiida Kagan orbital solar mirrors. However, the meeting was immediately interrupted by a mysterious intruder going by the name Baron Muster, who killed the guards and threatened the council to strip away Cydonia's rights to the solar mirrors. Policella angrily objected, but was horrified to recognize Muster as none other than Itall Sonann, who was supposed to be dead years ago. Immediately after her shocked realization, Muster petrified and shattered her with the poison Krista Morten. Her death left Kagura completely vulnerable to Maruki's scheme.

==== Ngema Neubauer ====
Dr. Ngema Neubauer (ヌゲマ・ヌーバウアー, Nugema Nūbauā) was the doctor assigned by Kagura Dornburg to find a cure for a strange tumor Kagura contracted after witnessing the unsealing of Goldstock. After it was discovered that the surviving excavation crews also contracted the same ailment, Ngema isolated the triggering compound and coined the disease as "Maske Tumor". He then conducted agonizing inhuman experiments on the survivors and killed them one by one by vivisection. Instead of trying to find a cure, Ngema switched his interest to try mass-producing the tumor for grafting onto mechanical bodies to make cyborg babies (which he called "Heraus Kind"), because he saw it as "the hope of mankind".

Due to Ngema no longer yielding any progress on finding a cure for Maske Tumor, Queen Kagura grew increasing impatient and angry, and threatened to kill him on multiple occasions. This caused Ngema to abscond into hiding and continue his Heraus Kind research in secrecy. However, as before, almost all his grafted babies failed to develop normal brains and had to be exterminated, until years later one tumor taken from a tortured woman named Nollin Sonann miraculously succeeded in growing into a healthy cyborg female infant, which Ngema codenamed HK-BR035. After he finished using Nollin, who was now crippled by years of mutilation, he sold her to a Sklodowska sideshow troupe, where she was found by her surviving brother Itall (now a homicidal criminal supervillain called Baron Muster), who tracked down Ngema's laboratory. When Muster confronted Ngema with the petrified severed heads of his wife, sons, and cat, rather than being afraid or upset, Ngema was amazed that Itall was still alive and demanded to examine him, and was largely indifferent to his family's murder, prompting Muster's henchwoman Zoe to comment in disgust that Ngema had the morality of an insect. Ngema then proudly presented to Muster the HK-BR035 girl, and confessed that he planned to reveal this achievement altogether when his paper was ready to be published. After hearing Ngema had yet to tell anyone about the girl, Muster killed him in an allegedly "unspeakable" way.

=== Flammarion ===
==== Ninon Silber ====
Ninon Silber (ニノン・ズィルバー, Ninon Zirubā) was the queen bee of the all-girl orphanage at the Flammarion town of Mamiana, and the self-claimed oldest daughter and heiress to the deposed Flammarion ruling family. When Erica and Yoko were left in the care of the Mamiana orphanage, Ninon's gang of five girls, consisting also of Morla, Gemma, Rena and Ulanova, starts bullying Yoko for her awkward mechanical gaits. When Erica jumped in to defend Yoko, Ninon immediately took an interest and wanted to make Erica her personal servant, and attempted to coerce Erica into feeding Yoko pillbugs. When Erica refused and fought back, Ninon's gang beat her up with brooms, and Ninon threatened to cut out Erica's tongue with scissors if she ever told any adults. However, the next day Ninon had a change of heart and personally apologized to both Erica and Yoko, and offered to tour them around the town and invited them to her "secret palace" — a makeshift leisure room inside the town's pumping station, and kindly read Yoko books. The town was then suddenly attacked by soldiers from the Flammarion Papagei Corps, who indiscriminately slaughtered residents. Only Ninon, Erica and Yoko managed to escape the pumping station alive. When Ninon recognized the banner of the Papagei Corps, which she mistakenly thought were still loyal to her family, she promised to protect Erica and Yoko, before going out alone trying to order the soldiers (in her family's name) to stop the massacre, and was fatally shot as a result. Her body was then disposed of with other victims using enzymatic decomposition.

Centuries later, Erica builds a monuments at the Mamiana ruins engraved with the names of Ninon and others, and Yoko (now renamed Alita) visits the site with flowers when she finally returns to Mars. When Erica (now a terrorist Necro-Soldier working for the Einherjar) provokes a fight with Alita in front of the memorial, Alita initially refuses to engage out of respect towards Ninon and the other deceased girls.
