= Herschel (lunar crater) =

Lunar impact crater

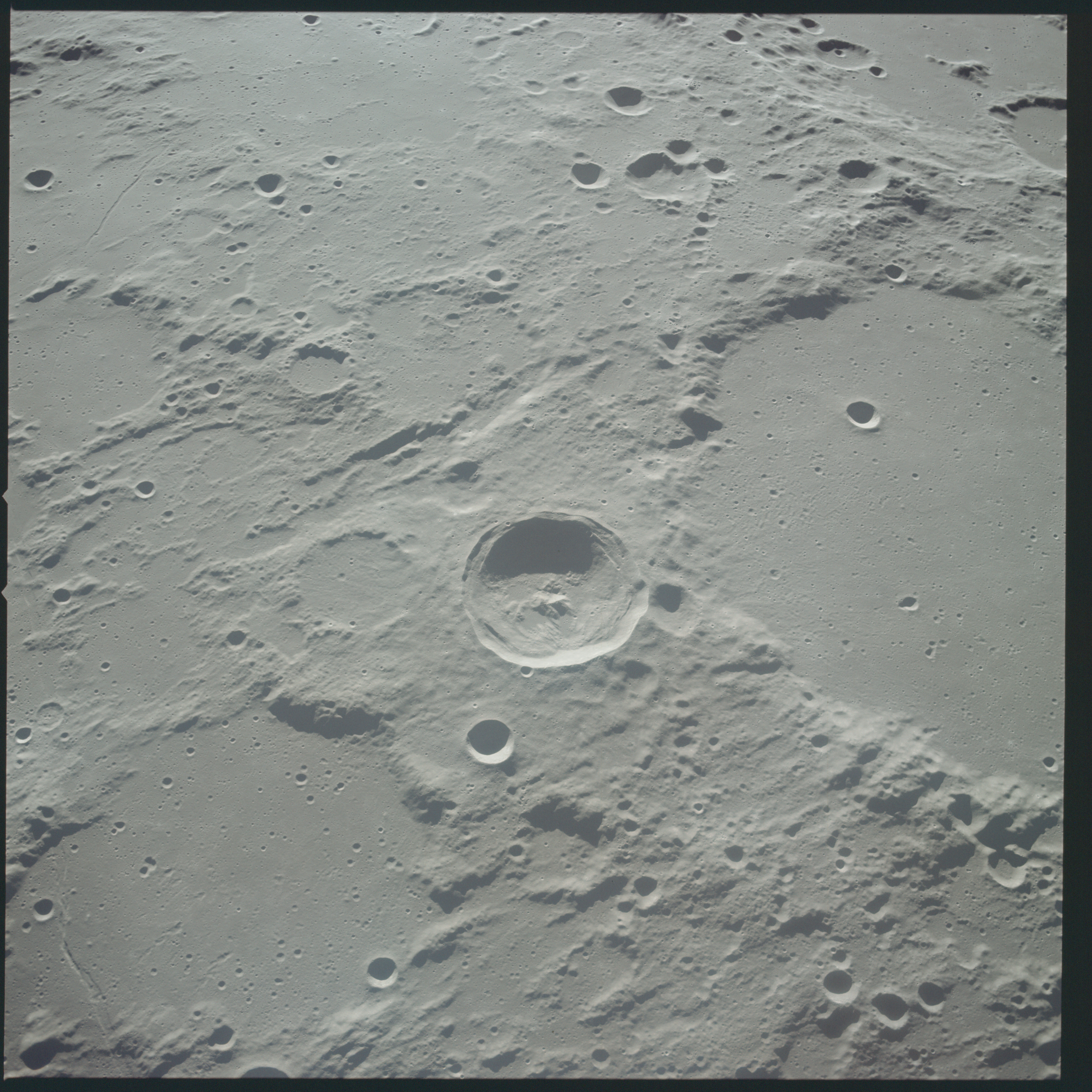
- Herschel (center), with Ptolemaeus (right) and Flammarion (lower left), from Apollo 12
- Coordinates: 5.7°S 2.1°W
- Diameter: 39 km
- Depth: 3.33 km
- Colongitude: 3° at sunrise
- Formation: Eratosthenian
- Eponym: William Herschel

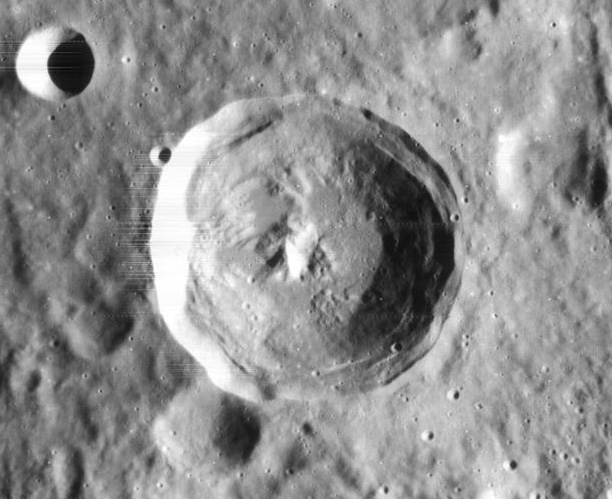
Lunar Orbiter 4 image of Herschel

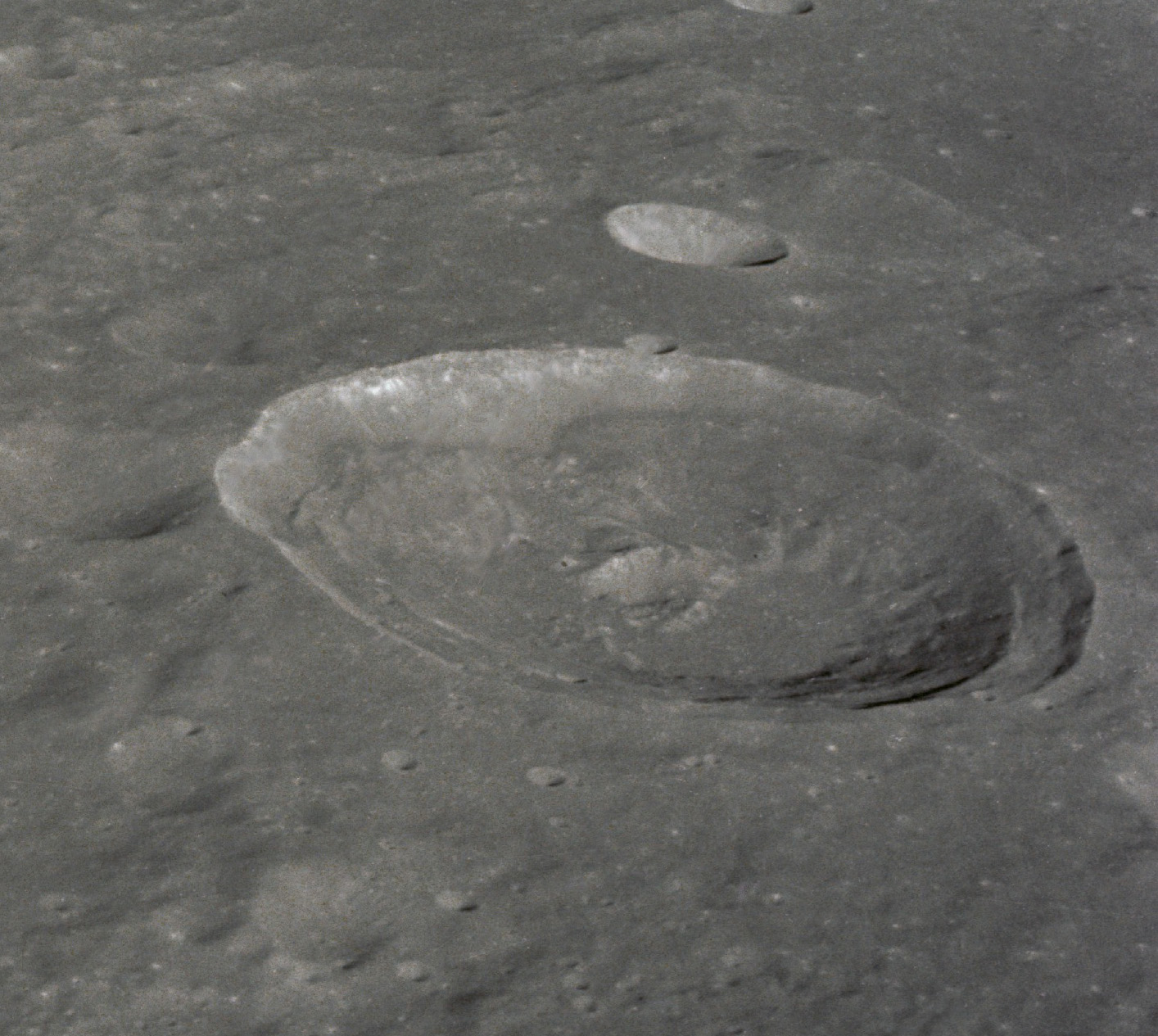
Oblique image of Herschel from Apollo 12

Herschel is a lunar impact crater located just to the north of the walled plain named Ptolemaeus. Its diameter is 39 km. It was named after German-born British astronomer William Herschel.

Just to the north is the flooded crater Spörer, and around 30 km due east lies the disintegrated crater Gyldén. About a crater diameter to the northwest (35 km) is the walled plain Flammarion, along the southern edge of the Sinus Medii.

The rim of this crater is generally circular, although the western side is straight. It has a well-defined edge that is not significantly worn, and the inner walls are terraced. On the rough inner floor is a notable central rise. This peak is offset slightly to the west of the crater midpoint. The infrared spectrum of pure crystalline plagioclase has been identified on this central peak. The small crater Herschel G is attached to the south-southwest rim, and a tiny craterlet lies across the southern rim.

Herschel is a crater of Eratosthenian age.

== Satellite craters ==
By convention these features are identified on lunar maps by placing the letter on the side of the crater midpoint that is closest to Herschel.

| Herschel | Latitude | Longitude | Diameter |
|---|---|---|---|
| C | 5.0° S | 3.2° W | 10 km |
| D | 5.3° S | 4.0° W | 20 km |
| F | 5.8° S | 4.4° W | 7 km |
| G | 6.5° S | 2.4° W | 14 km |
| H | 6.3° S | 3.4° W | 5 km |
| J | 6.4° S | 4.3° W | 5 km |
| N | 5.2° S | 1.1° W | 15 km |
| X | 5.3° S | 2.7° W | 3 km |
