= Hugo Gyldén =

Finland-Swedish astronomer

Johan August Hugo Gyldén
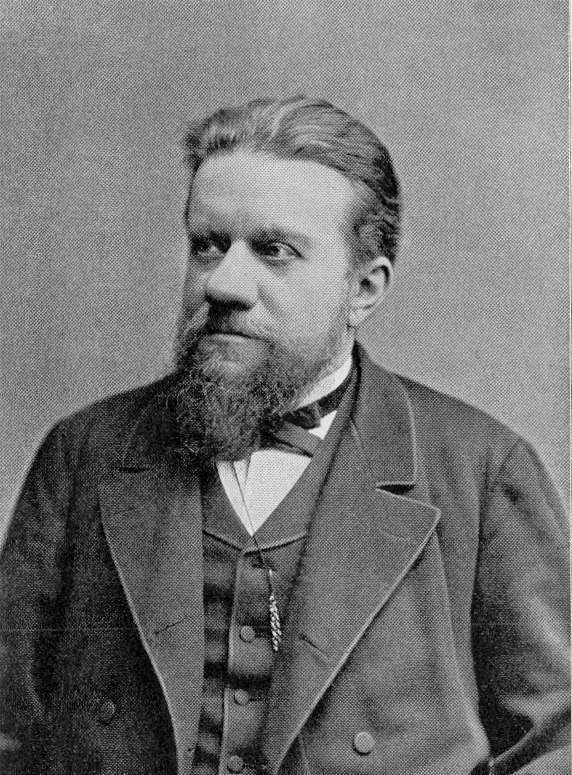
- Born: May 29, 1841; Helsinki
- Died: November 9, 1896 (aged 55); Stockholm
- Education: University of Helsinki (1860)
- Known for: Gyldén (crater), minor planet 806 Gyldénia

Johan August Hugo Gyldén (May 29, 1841 in Helsinki – November 9, 1896 in Stockholm) was a Finland-Swedish astronomer primarily known for work in celestial mechanics.

Gyldén was the son of Nils Abraham Gyldén, Professor of Classical philology at the University of Helsinki and baroness Beata Sofia Gyldén. He spent his student years at his father's university, graduating as a filosofie magister from the Faculty of Physics and Mathematics in 1860. He studied under Lorenz Leonard Lindelof and then went to do a postdoctoral at Gotha under Peter Hansen working on the orbit of Neptune. In 1871 he was called by the Royal Swedish Academy of Sciences to be its astronomer and head of the Stockholm Observatory. From 1872 he was a member of the Academy. In 1885 he became foreign member of the Royal Netherlands Academy of Arts and Sciences.

The lunar crater Gyldén and the minor planet 806 Gyldenia were named in his honor.

Photograph of astronomer Hugo Gylden (1841-1896) taken by Hugo Buchholz, Ehrhardt Karras, Halle.
