= 806 Gyldénia =

Main-belt asteroid

Discovery
- Discovered by: M. F. Wolf
- Discovery site: Heidelberg Obs.
- Discovery date: 18 April 1915

Designations
- Named after: Hugo Gyldén (astronomer)
- Alternative designations: 1915 WX · 1950 LT
- Minor planet category: main-belt · (outer)

Orbital characteristics
- Epoch 16 February 2017 (JD 2457800.5)
- Uncertainty parameter 0
- Observation arc: 101.57 yr (37,097 days)
- Aphelion: 3.4506 AU
- Perihelion: 2.9678 AU
- Semi-major axis: 3.2092 AU
- Eccentricity: 0.0752
- Orbital period (sidereal): 5.75 yr (2,100 days)
- Mean anomaly: 280.53°
- Mean motion: 0° 10^{m} 17.04^{s} / day
- Inclination: 14.240°
- Longitude of ascending node: 43.987°
- Argument of perihelion: 119.50°

Physical characteristics
- Mean diameter: 57 ± 8 km (pole solution 1); 55 ± 4 km (pole solution 2)
- Synodic rotation period: 16.85695 ± 0.00003 h (pole solution 1); 16.85699 ± 0.00007 h (pole solution 2)
- Pole ecliptic longitude: 34° ± 12° or 39° ± 2°
- Pole ecliptic latitude: 235° ± 15° or 42° ± 5°
- Geometric albedo: 0.022±0.001; 0.023±0.004; 0.0259±0.001 (IRAS:14); 0.0373 (derived)
- Spectral type: C
- Absolute magnitude (H): 9.953±0.002 (R) · 10.10 · 10.2 · 10.55±0.22 · 10.6

806 Gyldénia, provisional designation 1915 WX, is a carbonaceous asteroid from the outer region of the asteroid belt, approximately 63 kilometers in diameter. It was discovered on 18 April 1915, by German astronomer Max Wolf at Heidelberg Observatory in southern Germany. The discovery observation was ignored for orbital determination, with the first used observation made at Vienna Observatory on 1 May 2015, reducing the asteroid's observation arc by 2 weeks.

The dark C-type asteroid orbits the Sun at a distance of 3.0–3.5 AU once every 5 years and 9 months (2,100 days). Its orbit has an eccentricity of 0.08 and an inclination of 14° with respect to the ecliptic. Several photometric light-curve analysis rendered a rotation period of 16.852±0.006 hours (best result) with a brightness variation of 0.18 in magnitude (U=3).

According to the surveys carried out by the Infrared Astronomical Satellite, IRAS, the Japanese Akari satellite, and NASA's Wide-field Infrared Survey Explorer with its subsequent NEOWISE mission, the asteroid's surface has a notably low albedo of less than 0.03, while the Collaborative Asteroid Lightcurve Link derived a somewhat higher value of 0.04.

The minor planet was named in honor of the Fenno-Swedish astronomer Hugo Gyldén (1841–1896), who was a director of the Stockholm Observatory. He developed a new technique to calculate the perturbations of planets and comets. The lunar crater Gyldén is also named after the astronomer (H 80)
