= List of Battle Angel Alita: Last Order characters =

The following is a list of characters from the Battle Angel Alita: Last Order manga by Yukito Kishiro. With the exception of a few characters who appeared previously in Battle Angel Alita, the majority of the characters who appear in Last Order are new. Some of them are based on fan submissions that were submitted to Kishiro for character ideas that he has adopted and expanded on.

== New major characters ==
=== Caerula Sanguis ===
Caerula Sanguis (カエルラ・サングウィス, Kaerura Sanguwisu; Latin for "blue blood") is one of several Last Order characters adapted from fan submissions that were solicited by Kishiro from his readers for character ideas. She is based a design called "Blue" by tfng, and the color blue is a recurring theme in the various aliases she has adopted. Formerly known as Vilma Fachiri, Caerula is first introduced as the Chairman of the Stellar Nursery Society, a small faction that operates within the main asteroid belt. However, she turns out to have a much longer history and background going back more than 700 years that parallel the creation of the current world within which the Battle Angel Alita universe is set, but was not revealed in the original manga series. As one reviewer notes, "in a very real sense Caerula's story is also the foundation of the present...her actions in the past played an instrumental role in bringing about the state of affairs that exists in Alita's current time."

Caerula is the last surviving Type-V mutant or "Cognate" as they refer to themselves as, a human who was infected by a retrovirus known as the V-virus, giving her vampire-like characteristics such as eternal youth. As a result of abilities that she has developed as a Type-V mutant, she is a formidable martial artist able to fully contend with cyborg opponents such as Alita, the series protagonist, even though she is still fully flesh and blood. Caerula is the protagonist of Battle Angel Alita: Last Order volume 9 (titled Angel's Duty by Viz Media), in which Alita does not appear once, making it the only volume thus far in both manga series to have this distinction.

Caerula is a highly skilled martial artist, a student of "48 schools and 125 divisions" of kung fu. She was a formidable fighter second only to Victor because of his skin hardening ability, and following his death, she might be peerless. Caerula is highly skilled in both hand-to-hand combat and sword combat (she fights with dual jian). Her long history of combat experience enables her to anticipate and counter her opponents while taking into account the surroundings and all possibilities. She developed a tactic known as the Eight Block Death Gate Array, a series of maneuvers designed to drive an opponent into an untenable position from which they can be killed in a final blow, which Mbadi acknowledges as inescapable once it has been executed.

As a result of being a Type-V mutant, Caerula's combat abilities are further enhanced. Because she is fully flesh and blood, more cyberized opponents tend to think that she is an ordinary human, which leads to underestimating her. She has more physical strength and heightened senses, such as being able to "see neural pulse flow", nullifying any speed advantage a more cyberized opponent may have over her. This is further enhanced by an acquired capability to ascertain the presence and trajectory of everything in her immediate environment during a fight, from the presence of her enemies, bullet trajectories, and minute details such as "the mice scurrying to take cover". Caerula's acquired regenerative ability can regenerate lost limbs over time and revive her from catastrophic injuries that appear to be fatal, such as her disembowelment following her fight with Victor Byron in ES 126 and her apparent "death" during her fight with Alita in ES 591. This ability appears to be aided by the consumption of fresh human blood, and she can completely suck an adult male dry, leaving him a desiccated corpse in seconds.

=== Sechs/Xechs ===
The sixth 'TUNED AR/GR Series 2' robot copy of Alita/Gally. After the shut down of the GIB, the abandoned AR-6/GR-6 renamed themselves Sechs, and found new purpose through combat, hunting down and destroying the other copies. Intending to ultimately destroy Alita in single combat, surpass the original, and earn the right to exist as a real warrior. After being defeated by Alita, and having the TUNED body destroyed, Sechs is temporarily put inside of Alita's old interactive interface to use as a body. After registering for the Z.O.T.T., Sechs transitions into the anatomically male Fizziroy body, made of cutting edge polyethylene materials, and different from his initial make as a replica of Alita.

=== Ping Wu/The Weasel ===
A hacker extraordinaire, refugee from the outside world and justice, Ping Wu (ピング・ウー, Pingu Ū) saves Alita and company after Mbadi expels them from Ketheres to burn up in atmospheric reentry. He offers to assist Alita in her rescue of Lou's brain from the Ketheres brain matrix. Although Alita distrusts him, she has no recourse, giving Ping one of Nova's brain chips as partial payment. Ping turns out to have a history with Trinidad and Ketheres, as it was he who stole the secret of nanotechnological longevity and spread it to the masses. He attempted to hack into the first Zenith of Things Tournament, but failed. Barely escaping with his life, Ping lost his left arm, which is now a robot named Kale who assists him. He spent 100 years in hiding in Robo-Asyl. He is officially listed as a member of the Space Angels' pit crew, and provides Alita with technical support when she invades Melchizedek.

=== Aga Mbadi/Trinidad ===
Officially the assistant chairman of LADDER, the Tiphares council and a celebrated hero, Aga Mbadi (アガ・ムバディ, Aga Mubadi) is known as Trinidad (トリニダード, Torinidādo) because he has the brain chips of three Tipharean geniuses inside his own head. Mbadi has more power and hidden agendas than most realize. Officially a supporter of the Mars Kingdom Parliament, he had Queen Limeira's father assassinated for yet undisclosed reasons. He directs the development of the transhuman world and the cooperation between the powers of the solar system. LADDER's military forces including its interplanetary peacekeepers and special forces who use stealth camouflage to make themselves invisible also fall under his command. Part of his rise to power appears to have been because of a mission to Pluto in which he appeared to be the sole survivor. Mbadi had a previously close relationship with Caerula Sanguis that has not yet been fully revealed. The two were once friends, and Mbadi knows quite a great deal about Caerula's background and her capabilities as a Type-V mutant. This relationship however has since evolved into one of mutual hostility, and both now seek to kill each other. Mbadi attempted to kill Alita and her companions after capturing Desty Nova soon after they arrived in Ketheres by ejecting them into space, but they were rescued by Ping. He takes an interest in the Space Angels after they enter the Zenith of Things Tournament (ZOTT). Mbadi is a powerful hacker and the only one who is a match for Ping. He can hack into cyborg bodies by just being in the same room as his targets, but in Alita's case, requires direct contact. He is a master of yoga and the ancient martial art of Kalarippayattu.

== Tiphareans ==
=== Nola Defarge ===
Nola Defarge, known in Japan as Nora Lafargue (ノーラ・ラファルグ, Nōra Rafarugu), is a young woman who lives in Tiphares, but hasn't had her brain switched for a biochip. She survives the breakdown of Tiphares society and her parents' suicide, and joins a group led by Jim Roscoe. With Pam Mahan and David Frank she sets out to find Desty Nova's lab and stumble upon the newly awakened Alita. Nola follows Alita through the chaotic city for a while and learns how to deal with her hopelessness in the process. She stays in Tiphares and helps with the rebuilding process.

=== Marge Mahan ===
Marge Mahan (マージ・マハン, Māji Mahan) is Pam's assigned mother. Unlike other adults, she seeks to bring peace to Tiphares by reconciling the adults and children. After Sachumodo is defeated by Alita, she emerges as the leader of the Tipharean survivors.

=== Pam Mahan ===
Pam Mahan (パム・マハン, Pamu Mahan) is a young, slightly ditsy girl and a close friend of Nola Defarge. She reminds Alita of Lou, and it is theorized that they come from the same genetic stock.

=== Jim Roscoe ===
Jim Roscoe (ジム・ロスコー, Jimu Rosukō) is one of the manufactured geniuses of Tiphares society, much like Desty Nova and Daisuke Ido. He becomes Nova's protégé and seems to have a bright future with him until Nova brings down Tipharean society by revealing the secret of Tiphares to all. Jim kills Nova to see if he told the truth about the brains of the adult populace being replaced with chips. This begins his spiral into despair over the state of the world.

Jim assumes the leadership of a band of children and young adults, and although he proves an effective leader, he is detached and manipulative, and carries a genocidal hatred against Tiphareans who have had their brains replaced with brain chips. He leads a party of youths into the core of the MIB with plans to hack it so that it will create a powerful giant robot named Sachumodo to defend his followers. Instead, his group runs afoul of a group of bloodthirsty adults led by his stepfather Casey. Jim barely escapes as his group is annihilated in the battle.

Reaching the MIB core, Jim discovers that Tiphares itself is simply a proving ground for manufactured intelligences like himself, with no other real purpose. This knowledge drives him over the edge, and he orders the newly created Sachumodo to destroy all of Tiphares, starting with Casey and his group. As Sachumodo slaughters them, he is killed by an arrow fired from one of Casey's henchmen.

=== Deckman 100 ===
One of Nova's creations, Deckman 100 is specially built to repair and maintain Alita's Imaginos body. He has been reprogrammed to loyally follow Alita wherever she travels, addressing her as "Master".

=== Sachumodo ===
Sachumodo (サチュモド) is a monstrous robot created by the MIB facilities, hacked by Jim Roscoe. Originally meant to be a protector, he becomes a tool of vengeance and destruction when Jim dies, leaving his memories and detached nihilism in the robot.

== Kunstlers ==
=== Gelda ===
Portrayed by Michelle Rodriguez

Gelda (ゲルダ, Geruda) is the woman who saved Erica and Yoko (Alita) when they were children from a squad of Martian soldiers and took them into Grünthal. Alita considers Gelda her master. She taught Yoko and Erica the Übergeheimnis combo Hertzer Nadel. Gerla has only appeared in Alita's flashbacks thus far and her status is unknown.

=== Tzykrow ===
Tzykrow (ツァイクロウ, Tsaikurou) is a former Höher Krieger of the Mauser School and the Kammer Gruppe instructor, known both as "The Raven" and "Tzyk the Brute". He is now a major of the High Order Squad, a group of LADDER special forces soldiers under Trinidad's direct command. Alita runs into him again 200 years after she was a former subordinate of his in the Kammer Gruppe when she infiltrates the Ketheres Central Core Block during the Z.O.T.T. to recover Lou's brain. After she dispatches two of his fellow guards, Tzykrow manages to slip through Alita's attacks and hit the override switch of her EVA suit, shutting off her stealth mode. After the introductions, Tzykrow reminds Alita of the results of the last mission she undertook as Yoko, Operation Maulwurf, and how she was supposed to self-destruct to avoid capture. He then fights Alita and initially has the upper hand, but then Alita recalls who she is and starts to press him. Tzykrow resorts to using Kurz Bombe Kunst, managing to hit Alita's arms with several of the tiny bombs. Alita's use of an original technique on him, the Plasma Bissen, completely surprises Tzyk, who falls to Alita's use of the Geheimnis Einsatzrhythmen, followed by Hertzer Nadel. He manages to escape the destruction of his body by distracting Alita with an eyeball bomb and detaching his head via his Seinerweisen. When Tzykrow opens a communications channel to contact Trinidad, Ping is able to hack into the channel and electrically shock him, disabling his circuits, if not frying them outright, and causing him to fall unconscious into the depths of the core. He is later shown to have made it back alive, only to be badly damaged by an enraged Trinidad and given over to the newly reincarnated Desty Nova for experimentation.

Tzykrow is a direct reference to the character Zycrow seen in Yukito Kishiro's previous manga series Aqua Knight, both in name and appearance.

== Ketheres residents ==
=== Lambda Nam Nam ===
Lambda Nam Nam (ランダ・ナムナム, Randa Namu Namu) is the leader of the independent robots who exist in a symbiotic relationship with Ketheres, performing maintenance in exchange for a power source. Considered a friend by Ping, he exiled Ping for rescuing Alita, Sechs, Elf, Zwölf and Deckman 100 after they were expelled from Ketheres by Aga Mbadi. When Ping and Alita later returned to Ketheres, he had all the entrances that they knew of sealed to prevent them from reentering. Lambda Nam Nam has a change of heart after witnessing Ping's sacrifice for Alita. Following her defeat by Super Nova, he had his robots gather the remnants of her body along with the Fata Morgana, and implored Melchizedek to save her.

== Leviathan 1 residents ==
=== Jack Gerambo ===
Jack Gerambo (J.ゲルランボー, Jakku Geruranbō) is a reporter for Combat TV who is first introduced during Alita and Zazie's quest through the combat chamber to capture all the flags. He has his crew deliver them to the final flag as part of a deal struck with Ping Wu in exchange for an interview with them. Gerambo later covers the Zenith of Things Tournament (ZOTT) with the aid of martial arts scholar Hegeor Hopper.

=== Hegeor Hopper ===
Hegeor Hopper (ヘジオア・ホッパー, Hejioa Hoppā) is a martial arts scholar who provides commentary and analysis alongside Jack Gerambo during the ZOTT. His knowledge of martial arts techniques and history is very comprehensive, as Caerula Sanguis acknowledges, and he realizes that Alita is possibly a surviving Kunstler. During the Space Angels' fight against the Starship Cult, the Cult's leader Whophon unleashes a deadly hypnotic technique that causes members of the audience to spontaneously combust. Hopper is one of those affected, but is able to mentally block out the fact that he actually is afire in the belief that it is an illusion. He survives his burns and continues to cover the ZOTT.

=== Colonel Payne ===
Colonel Payne (ペイン大佐, Pein Taisa) was originally the heartless owner of a juvenile infantry school, providing children to fight wars for entertainment on the space colony Leviathan 1. He owned Giraud's platoon and Zazie was a former member of his school. After being dispatched by Alita for using innocent children as cannon fodder, Colonel Payne stays in her psyche as a Jungian shadow, embodying her dark side and, ironically, exerting more influence on her in his death than in life.

=== Rem Ray ===
Ping Wu's ex-girlfriend, Rem Ray (レム・レィ, Remu Rei) is a field surgeon who operates on survivors of the war games in Leviathan I. Although she helps Ping and Alita meet Martin, she rebuffs his attempt to get back together with her after he went into hiding on Ketheres for 100 years. Later on however, Desty Nova in the form of Portanova contacts her for assistance after Ping is attacked by LADDER special forces, nearly killing Ping.

=== Martin Tsang ===
A morbidly obese man and Ping's former partner in crime, Martin Tsang (マルチン・ツァン, Maruchin Tsan) was known as the "Skunk". He survived Trinidad's assault on Ping and his fellow hackers and established himself as a commodities broker on Leviathan I. After Ping met him again after 100 years, the two got into a major fight for Martin's backing out on Ping, but he ended up helping Ping out by sponsoring the Zenith of Things Tournament team headed by Alita, the Space Angels. Ping uses his likeness to fool LADDER cameras that are spying on him when he is in Ketheres.

== Mars Kingdom Parliament ==
The Mars Kingdom Parliament is a constitutional monarchy sponsored by LADDER and one of three factions fighting for control of the planet Mars. The Kingdom Parliament has a unique philosophy in that it has officially rejected the Methusalization made possible by Ping Wu's discovery that enables people to become effectively immortal, believing that human life has more value because of mortality. As a result, they are sympathetic to causes such as that of Guntroll which attempts to save children.

=== König ===
A talking teddy bear that Queen Limeira has had with her since she was a toddler, it has not yet been revealed what König (ケーニッヒ, Kēnihhi)'s true nature is. His first appearance at a LADDER meeting led the Venusian and Jovian factions to suspect that Queen Limeira's dead father had transplanted his brain into König because his name means "king" in German. He appears to be capable of speech and independent thought, although it may simply be ventriloquism on the part of Limeira.

=== Queen Limeira ===
The constitutional head of the Mars Kingdom Parliament, Queen Limeira (リメイラ女王, Rimeira Joō) is young, but has a wisdom beyond her years, being able to confound even Aga Mbadi. However, she tends to lapse into a younger, more immature version of herself more reflective of her actual age, partly due to her behavior around König. It has been suggested that she is a ventriloquist who often uses König as a mouthpiece. However, when König does speak, it is usually to make serious policy pronouncements or statements on behalf of the Mars Kingdom Parliament. Her father the king was assassinated under Mbadi's orders, but she has yet to discover this fact.

=== Zazie ===
Queen Limeira's devoted escort and bodyguard, Zazie, known in Japan as Xazi (ザジ, Zaji), has served her since she was a toddler. She was a survivor of Colonel Payne's school and as a result is a highly trained and skilled soldier especially in the use of firearms. She discovers Alita and Ping as stowaways on the Mars Kingdom Parliament's spacecraft and nearly self-destructs to kill Alita. Later on however, she assists Alita in the combat chamber on Leviathan I by capturing the flags scattered throughout the chamber to atone for their failure to save Giraud's platoon on time. She fights and defeats Hogan, a member of the Space Karate team, and helps Alita in her fight against the leader, Toji. In volume 11 she joins the Space Angels in the arena, though she is suffering from the aftereffects of a blow from Frau X, Kunstler on Mars.

== Zenith of Things Tournament competitors and affiliates ==
Elf and Zwolf

Elf (エルフ Erufu, Eleven in German) and Zwölf (ツヴェルフ Tsuverufu, Twelve in German) appears in Last Order as the only two TUNED units to escape Sechs' killing spree. Throughout the series they appear as cuter twin versions of Alita, supplying comic relief and craziness through personality, dress styles and fighting styles. They are seen together, acting like twins, although they call each other best friends. At first they worked as singers in Barjack City before they becoming Desty Nova's bodyguards, and eventually they enter the Zenith of Things Tournament (Z.O.T.T.) as "Dark Alita" (Zwölf) and "White Alita" (Elf) of the Space Angels team.

=== Guntroll ===
Also known as the Stellar Nursery Society Team, the Guntroll are formed from a group that takes care of children. With widespread immortality through advanced nanotechnology, children are widely seen as a threat. Guntroll fight in the tournament to win the first prize of nationhood, which would allow them to create a safe place for children they rescue.

==== Qu Tsang ====
Second-in-command of the Guntrolls, Qu Tsang (クー・ツァン, Kū Tsan) is a dark-skinned cyborg woman with clearly visible mechanical arms. Her appearance is probably the least menacing of the whole team, as even in combat she appears clothed like a nursery school's teacher. She does hold her own in combat however, and demonstrates to be a formidable foe, quickly defeating Elf and Zwölf and then Sechs, only to be mercilessly dismembered by Alita seconds later. She survives the fight, and is last seen recommending Caerula "not to get killed".

==== Getz and Koen ====
A cyborg clad in an armor-like suit with many scars on his face, that of a human old man, Getz (月門, Getto) fights against Sechs, Elf and Zwölf. He appears to have a little degree of arrogance, as he deems his enemies "too little" for him, as he usually fights building-size robots. He fights using a peculiar rotation technique based on the blade-like appendages located on his armor and a gigantic, jet-propelled sword dubbed "Dizaster". More importantly, he is always seen with a mechanical monkey named Koen (虹猿, Kōen), which is mainly responsible for assisting Getz in combat with its wrist-mounted batons. Getz is also protected by a powerful shield, which in turn is useless against Koen, who can travel freely across its perimeter. Sechs notices this and uses the monkey to her own advantage, impaling it and nullifying Getz's barrier, before stabbing and defeating him.

==== Niz ====
One of the most normal-looking members of Guntroll, Niz (ニッツ, Nittsu) fights with an enormous, armor-like exoskeleton similar to a mecha, armed with catapults on each of its extremely long arms. Niz himself is not prone to fight like his comrades, but when urged can hold his own and demonstrates it as he engages Sechs. He attacks by throwing punches at very high speed using his arm-catapults, or throwing items and/or his own enemies, obliterating them with the impact. This turns out to work against him when Sechs, before being launched, binds Niz's head with an elastic belt and, using it to prevent himself from being launched, defeats him with his Solenoid Quench Gun.

==== Saya ====
Last member of the Guntroll, no more than an ordinary human nurse teacher, and a young one of all things, Saya (サヤ) appears to be carefree and always prone to smile, even when facing brutal opponents. She appears to be a competent fighter, specialized in throws, but instead of going to a probable slaughter at the hands of Alita she is ordered to stay behind by Caerula.

=== Space Karate Forces ===
==== Gavit ====
An arrogant practitioner of the Gadokai style, Gavit (牙鼻人, Gavito)'s strength and endurance was such that he could break a tank leg in half with a single kick. Gavit earned the nickname "Scarab" for his habit of pummeling his opponents until they resembled balls of compacted metal. He was defeated by Alita in the Combat Room of Leviathan I when his torso exploded from the strain he suffered using his "phalanx" punching technique.

==== Hogan ====
Hogan (鳳眼, Hōgan)'s cyborg body was modelled after a bird of prey, or perhaps a tengu, complete with wings, talons and a beaked face. Although Zazie had trouble fighting him at first due to his electromagnetic shield deflecting her bullets, she later wingclipped him with a non-metallic grenade and finished him off with her combat knife. Like Gavit, he was reputed to usually underestimate his opponents.

==== Toji ====
Undefeated master of Electromagnetic Space Karate, Toji (刀耳, Tōji)'s gigantic body and expressionless face gives him the menacing look of a simple brute, in contrast to his calm and calculating personality. He chose to surrender to Alita and Zazie in the Combat Chamber after they earned his respect by wounding and incapacitating him in the midst of his own "Mud Tsunami" death-trap. Toji later vowed to face and defeat Alita in the ZOTT. Currently he is awaiting his match against the Venusians in the quarter-finals. He was a disciple of former Space Karate founder Don Fua (who was also Zekka's comrade during their training), who sometimes appears to him as a sort of illusionary guide. In his early years as a karate master Toji was arrogant, but changed drastically after he got at odds with the master of his dojo, accusing its philosophies to have drift far away from those wished by Don Fua. During his fight with anomaly in volume 11, Toji expresses disbelief when he hears of Alita's death and claims that she will not be dead as long as he can fight on.

==== Zekka ====
A tall cyborg with slanted compound eyes and dreadlocks, Zekka (絶火) has a reputation for being a brutal and unpredictable fighter. One of the two known combat cyborgs to possess a Fizziroy Body (Sechs being the other), he entered ZOTT to fight for Toji's team during the last matches. Absurdly powerful and extremely confident, he sometimes acted as a non-willing comic relief, such as when his motorbike got vandalized by Sechs. He is often seen slacking off, not even going to fight with his teammate Toji, whom considers a mere young and inexperienced one.

Zekka and Don Fua fought in the semi-finals of a previous ZOTT. The impact of their techniques incapacitated both, destroyed the arena and sent a shockwave down the orbital elevator that shook loose one of the cables connecting Tiphares to the Scrapyard. Mbadi is seen musing on the political consequences as it showed individuals could have as much power as entire nations.

=== Starship Cult ===
==== Springfoot Jack ====
The founder and former leader of the Starship Cult, Springfoot Jack (バネ足ジャック, Bane Ashi Jakku) was a former Stellar Nursery Society alumnus named Molonev Menhir who was left to his own devices along with other "graduates" upon reaching the age of fifteen. After spending fifteen years working dead-end jobs and finally living as a vagrant, Menhir finally finds a higher purpose during a chance encounter with a dying criminal dressed as a clown. The incident inspires Menhir to believe that life itself is madness, and plans on spreading this belief to others, particularly children.

Menhir then adopts a new persona named "Springfoot Jack", a sinister clown with extendable legs, arms, neck and fingers which are now attached by powerful springs. He also has incredible powers of hypnotism, able to take control of victims on the spot and have them perform incredible feats. The effects of his hypnotism depend on the victim's receptiveness to suggestion, with some reaching as far as supernatural levels (such as becoming hard as steel). He forms a traveling circus named "The Magic Troupe", a cult in which Jack captures victims to test their receptiveness to his hypnotism using brutal physical torture. The survivors of the tests become additions to his cult. His cult is eventually taken over by one of own his captives, Whophon, who renames it "The Starship Cult".

The Starship Cult enters the tenth annual ZOTT tournament. Jack longs to face the Guntrolls, composed of the very Stellar Nursery School faculty he feels abandoned him. The Guntrolls instead are defeated early on by the Space Angels, who go on to match against the Starship Cult. He easily makes hypnotized victims of Elf and Zwölf, deluding Elf into shooting herself in a rigged game of Russian Roulette while having Zwölf behave as a human boomerang. His trickery and hypnotism are not enough to deter Sechs, who easily overcomes his gimmicks and slays him.

==== Lily ====
Found by Springfoot Jack, Lily (リリー, Rirī) became a member of the Starship Cult, along with Whophon, by merit of having been one of the few survivors of Jack's tests. Lily functions as Jack's assistant, her receptiveness to hypnotism so strong she is able to physically imitate any object that Jack commands her to. Ordered to become a "human sword", Lily's body becomes hard enough to counter Sechs' Titan Blade, much to the latter's surprise. Sechs is able to defeat her by mimicking Springfoot Jack's voice and ordering her to take the form of flan, causing her to literally melt.

==== Whophon ====
An experimental subject of Dr. Gor Din known as Jetan G, Whophon (フーフォン, Fūfon) escaped from Dr. Gor Din's lab and was found by Springfoot Jack. Jack adds him to the Starship Cult under the alias Moonchild or MC when he survives his brutal "tests". Whophon eventually seizes control of the cult from Jack, and uses the cult for his own endeavors and designs for power, including a harem of one hundred women. Whophon has incredible psychic powers, strong enough to delude entire audiences with illusions and even cause spontaneous combustion to occur.

He leads the Starship Cult during their campaign in the ZOTT, and takes on Sechs after he defeats Jack. Insane and genocidal, Whophon instead decides to commit mass chaos, causing various audience members to spontaneously combust (including announcer H. Hopper and nearly Mbadi himself), and orders all of his harem to commit mass suicide when the ZOTT judges ask the women to depart the arena. Sechs himself nearly succumbs to madness and spontaneous combustion, until he realizes at the last moment that Whophon's illusions do not appear in reflective surfaces, and uses a mirror plating on his costume to track down and destroy Whophon amongst the illusions.

However, observing the carnage outside, Mbadi and Dr. Din discover that the "Whophon" Sechs has slain in the arena is a double. The real Whophon appears and launches incomprehensible illusions at Mbadi. Mbadi merely marches through the illusions and, declaring that reality is not to be altered without his "consent", snaps Whophon's neck.

==== Misha ====
A member of The Starship Cult who was saved from committing suicide by Sechs, curious as to why she would want to kill herself. Fearful of the cult leader Whopon, Misha again attempted to kill herself leading to Sechs knocking her out for the remainder of the match. Waking up shortly after Whopon's defeat by Sechs, it was revealed that Misha was accounted as the last member of the Starship Cult team that Sechs had to fight, and submitted to whatever decision that Sechs may make. Sechs considered killing her in combat to be easy, but far too easy and spared her, leaving her on the battlefield alive.

=== Anomaly ===
Anomaly (アノーマリー, Anōmarī) is not a team, but a single contender of the ZOTT. A "true inorganic life form" as dubbed by Mbadi, it is a nanomachine-based monstrosity born from unknown origin, but supposedly from the surface of Mercury years after the whole planet became covered in a sea of uncontrollable nanomachines in a Grey Goo event, and was created as a way to make contact with humans through the language of combat, though it was only able to form a grotesque caricature of what the nanomachines' collective mind thought humans were like. Standing dozens of feet in height and sporting a menacing, almost disturbing look, it has humanoid appendages, a thin body and a massive head, but his most prominent feature is a massive penis almost as big as Anomaly itself is, used as a battering ram (in a fashion similar to the movement of a real penis during intercourse) and a powerful energy cannon (dubbed "Libido Cannon"). While gargantuan and enormously powerful, Anomaly was basically instinct-driven and thus easily destroyed multiple times during the tournament, only to repair itself completely in a matter of seconds and then obliterate its enemies. Toji faced this "Freudian nightmare" (as nicknamed by Nova) and was almost defeated when Zekka saved the day and pierced Anomaly's penis with a beer bottle, then used Toji himself as a projectile to cause the beast to overheat and detonate in melted pieces, thus rendering its regeneration completely useless.

=== War-Men 609 ===
The only member of the Jupiter Team, War-Men 609 (ウォーメン609, Wōmen 609) cannot be considered a fighter but an engine of destruction. It sports an array of menacing weapons and a gargantuan size (exactly the maximum allowed size according to tournament rules), coupled with the ability to change its form and thus adapt itself to the flow of battle. The longer the fight, the more powerful this mechanical beast becomes. Three forms appear: the Übernaut, Voyna, and Tunguska, the most powerful and final form.

=== Genome Kingdom ===
The flagship team of Venus. Whereas the Jovians rely on technology, the Venusians specialize solely on an extreme and highly sophisticated form of bioengineering, having everything from clothes to weapons created from organic matter into grotesque forms.

==== Homme du Feu ====
Literally "man from fire" in French ("man of fire" in French is "homme de feu"), Homme-du-feu (オムデュフー, Omudyufū) is mostly a younger, pre-cyborgization Zekka, after he became a martial arts master. He is not the same character but a clone, created by Genome Kingdom using his genes after Zekka sold his human body (and the right to his genome) in favor of a more powerful, cybernetic one. While his face is that of a young Zekka, Homme-du-feu sports a menacing, lycanthrope-like body with large clawed hands and feet, a mane around his head and wolf ears. He is almost always silent, responding to orders in polite French, and fights with the same style as his older, cybernetic self. What little was revealed of his technique was a somewhat slower, less experienced method of karate, which was only able to strike Zekka once (albeit with great power) and only because Zekka had let his guard down momentarily. Homme-du-feu is the Captain of the Venusian team and while he lacks the raw power of other contestants he makes up for it with unsurpassed cunning able to trick his opponents and exploit their weaknesses. It is revealed in his youth that he was called Igrec and was raised by a gynoid named Olympe, at some point in his adulthood he was gripped by a maddening hunger which drove him to rip her to pieces but was unable to consume her non-biological body. It is suggested that he is in love with her and that his "hunger" might be lust which his specifically combat engineered body may be unable to express. After Olympe was rebuilt the only reward he desired for victory at the ZOTT was her freedom.

==== Bigorne ====
Quadrupedal monster, protected by a biological reactive armor through his metallic-hydrogen scales, attacks using biological missiles created on the spot as well as high-velocity projectiles out of its fingers. His tail is a semi-independent millipede-type organism attacking using pincers made of a tungsten-californium alloy.

==== Chichevache ====
Quadrupedal monster also protected by metallic-hydrogen scales, Chicheface attacks using a hydrogen fluoride laser.

==== Arduinna ====
Colonial organism starting as an 80 cm embryonic form and growing through consumption of inorganic matter, ends up as a gigantic organism taking over the whole arena and using multitudes of attacks.

==== Gargantua ====
The final warrior of Genome Kingdom, Gargantua is created by firing a vegetative graft into Homme-Du-Feu. The graft fuses Arduina and Homme-Du-Feu, giving birth to a giant bigger than the ZOTT arena and controlled by Homme-Du-Feu, but having a very limited life span (two hours). Gargantua seems mostly vegetal, and is able to use sound-based attacks (howls) as well as direct physical ones (taking apart the arena and using its pieces as weapons). Gargantua has enough physical force to overwhelm the arena's containment field and throw platforms through the arena's walls and right into space (along with Toji).

Gargantua ultimately self-destructs after Homme Du Feu witnesses Olympe being shot by Pissaro.

==== Pissarro Crie De Vouivre ====
The creator of the Genome Kingdom, Pissarro is a Gesigner (a portmanteau of Genome and Designer), a type of bio-engineer that manipulates biology for a similar way a fashion designer designs clothes. His true form is a small rat-like humanoid piloting a suit composed of multiple creatures that together resemble as a tall man with flamboyant clothing affixed to a stumpy platform-like creature. He always carries around a hand-fan which appears to be a feathered creature.

==== Olympe ====
An antique sentient gynoid created as a pleasure doll at unknown point in the distant past that raised Homme-du-feu and taught him cunning. She was destroyed at some point by Homme-du-feu, as he attempted to eat her as a means of being closer to her, only to find that he couldn't devour her synthetic body. She was later rebuilt to serve as a motivation for him to win the ZOTT. She attempted to kill Chief Gesigner Pissarro as a means of freeing herself and Homme-du-feu from his control, but was subsequently killed by Pissarro in retaliation for her failed attempt.

== Type-V mutants ==
See also Type-V mutant

=== Victor Byron ===
The most powerful Type-V mutant and Vilma's husband, Victor Byron (ヴィクター・バイロン, Vikutā Bairon) was a knight during the Crusades and has been alive for more than 1,000 years, becoming a Type-V mutant after he survived a hanging. He still speaks in an archaic manner reflecting his medieval origins. Victor is the last surviving leader of The Society, a group of Type-V Mutants that has dwindled to a handful members. They accompany him in roaming the snow-covered post-apocalyptic world, killing and eating the humans they find in an area and then moving on. Until the Type-V mutants are the only ones left on Earth, Victor is content to continue this existence after which he would kill Jacco and Morse, eat them, then die together with Vilma. Indeed, Vilma is the only other Type-V mutant Victor cares for more than himself, as he nearly committed suicide in his grief and depression after she disappeared in ES 69, and was willing to sacrifice Zapolska to demonstrate human treachery to her. He also threatened to kill anyone who insulted her when Jacco questioned his motivations for leading them into the trap set by Keiran Farrell and left it up to Vilma whether to choose them or the humans of the Farrell Shelter.

Based on his experience of being betrayed and turned into a Type-V mutant and as a result of his Christian beliefs, Victor sees his fate as being heaven-sent and his mission as one to rid the world of "every last sinful lamb". He has a deep distrust of all humans and sees Type-V mutants as the wolves who prey on human sheep. Victor is a skilled swordsman, but his real abilities lie in being able to withstand devastating amounts of damage that would kill any other Type-V mutant many times over. After having gone through and survived numerous states of "Altered Shock" due to his prolonged age, Victor can increase the hardness and durability of his body surface by degrees until it reaches a near impenetrable armored state that is impervious to nearly all of Vilma's deadliest attacks. This final state however, uses up a lot of energy, leaving him a coma for months afterwards. Thanks to this ability, he won the previously recalcitrant Vilma over when she challenged him in ES 32 in Hong Kong by being able to withstand nine out of ten attacks that she threw at him in an attempt to kill him. Realizing that she had been defeated, she was unable to make her tenth attack.

In ES 126, the Cognate encountered Arthur Farrell, the grandson of John Farrell (see Earth Impact winter Survivors). Vilma's hope for humanity was rekindled, but she realized that Victor stood in the way and that there would be no chance for the Merlin Project that Arthur was supervising as long as Victor was still alive. She attempted to kill him, but failed, getting dragged into a prolonged fight that nearly resulted in her death and Victor's near triumph, although he had to push himself to his full armored transformation to withstand her attacks. By chance, the impact winter ended as Merlin predicted, enabling Vilma to deal Victor a death blow before he finished her off. Believing that God had chosen the humans over the Cognate by ending the impact winter, he enjoined Vilma to watch over them and not grieve for him before he died.

== Impact winter survivors ==
=== Arthur Farrell ===
Arthur Farrell (アーサー・ファレル, Āsā Fareru) is the grandson of John Farrell, and is in charge of the Merlin Project. He becomes the leader of the Bradley Shelter after his fiancée, Haruka, is killed by the leader of the surviving Type-V mutants, Victor Byron. His fame for "defeating" Victor and Vilma allows him to take leadership of the remnants of the human race after the impact winter ends. He realizes that the human race could never survive a second impact, so pushes relentlessly forward to re-establish a human presence in space and on other planets. His ruthless tactics make him an object of fear and hatred, but he never wavers in achieving his ultimate goal. His last act before his death is to give Vilma, the Type-V mutant, the "Fata Morgana". This is a specially encrypted program that can be used to deactivate Melchizedek, the computer that controls Tiphares and Ketheres and helps Aga Mbadi to maintain complete control over Earth.

=== John Farrell ===
John Farrell (ジョン・ファレル, Jon Fareru) is the son of Keiran Farrell and grandfather of Arthur. He discovered Vilma Fachiri in the snow after a fight with some mutant humans and took her to the Farrell Shelter, where she was nursed back to health.

=== Keiran Farrell ===
Keiran Farrell, known in Japan as Colin Farrell (コリン・ファレル, Korin Fareru), is the leader of the Farrell Shelter, a small shelter community and a former scientist pre-Catastropher who worked on the forerunner of the supercomputer Merlin.

=== Haruka ===
Arthur Farrell's fiancée, whom he grew up with, Haruka (ハルカ) has a gentle nature and is a talented flutist, although she once became very upset with Arthur for inviting Vilma to make him a Type-V mutant after she found out that they lose their reproductive capabilities. A bit naive, Haruka is the only other resident of the Bradley Shelter besides Arthur who trusts Vilma, and believes that Victor Byron will decide to peacefully coexist with them. Fearing a possible repetition of the events of fifty years before, Victor, happening upon Haruka in the woods, attacks her and tries to turn her into a Type-V mutant, telling her that if she can still wish for peace after becoming one then he will truly reconsider his position on humans. The trauma of the transformation and the realization that she will no longer be able to bear children prove too great, however, and Haruka succumbs to blood loss and exposure.

=== Radha ===
Arthur Farrell's friend and a student of Vedic math, Radha (ラダ, Rada) is one of those working on the Merlin project.
