= Beata Sofia Gyldén =

Finnish poet (1804–1864)

- Born: 5 December 1804 Anjala, Finland
- Died: 5 June 1864 (aged 59) Jena, Germany
- Occupation: Writer

Beata Sofia Gyldén born Wrede af Elimä (5 December 1804 Anjala – 5 June 1864 Jena) was a Finnish poet who wrote in Swedish.

== History ==
Gyldén's parents were a free lord, lieutenant colonel Gustaf Wrede af Elimä and Fredrika Lovisa Georg-Fredrikintytär Tigerstedt. In 1837, she married Nils Abraham Gyldén, who in 1847 became a professor of Greek literature at the University of Helsinki. Their son Johan August Hugo Gyldén (1841–1896) was an astronomer at the Royal Swedish Academy of Sciences and director of the Stockholm Observatory.

Gyldén published her poems in the Insjövågen album published in 1853, where the authors appeared under the common name Fruntimmer. Other authors of the album were at least Sara Karolina Gadolin from Oulu (born Ekman, 1800–1875) and Lucina Constantia Ingeborg Wallenius (1832–1913). The album received a bad reception in the columns of Helsinki newspapers, and the authors were even accused of a lack of self-criticism.
