= Gyldén (crater) =

Crater on the Moon

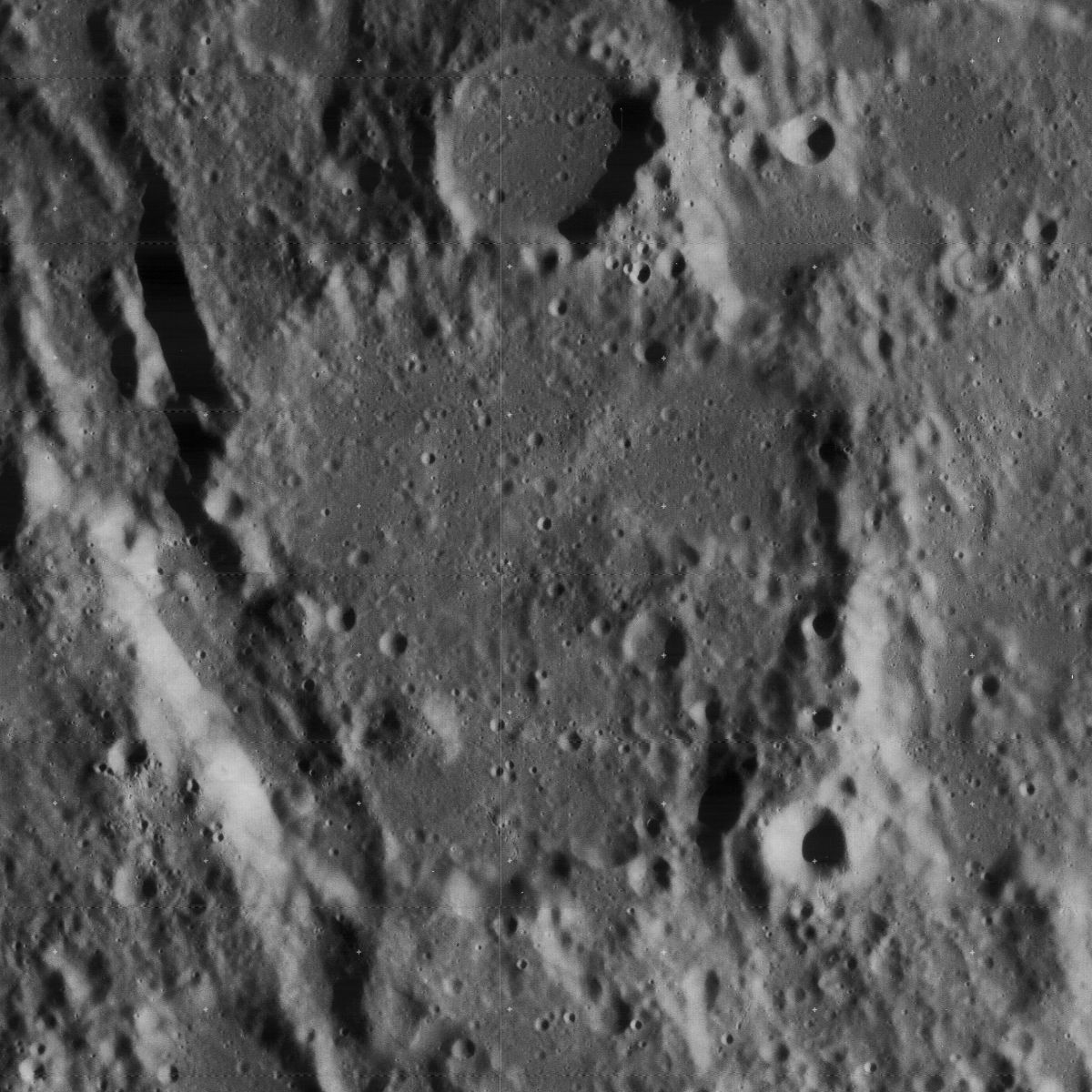
- Lunar Orbiter 4 image
- Coordinates: 5.3°S 0.3°E
- Diameter: 48 km
- Depth: 1.8 km
- Colongitude: 0° at sunrise
- Eponym: Hugo Gyldén

Gyldén is the remnant of a lunar impact crater that is located to the northeast of the walled plain Ptolemaeus on the Moon. Its diameter is 48 km. It is named after the Finland-Swedish astronomer Hugo Gyldén. It lies along the prime meridian of the selenographic coordinate system, and less than 150 km south of the lunar equator. Nearby craters of note include Herschel to the west, the flooded Réaumur to the north, and Hipparchus to the east.

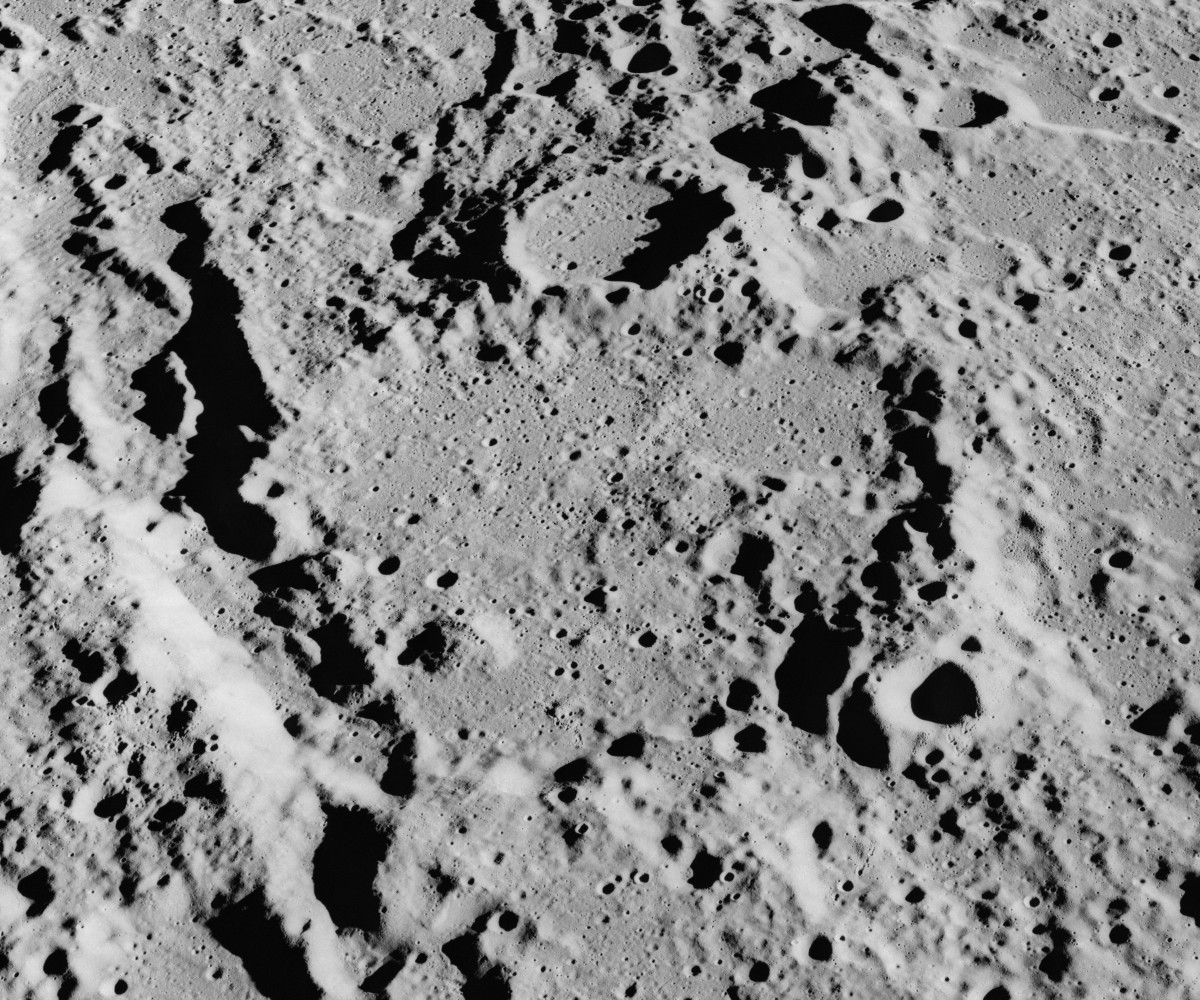
Oblique view from Apollo 16

The heart-shaped rim of this crater is in poor condition, having been eroded by impacts until the disintegrating remnants form an uneven ring of peaks and valleys around the interior floor. The satellite crater Réaumur A is attached to the northern rim. A wide cleft cuts through the western rim, continuing to the north-northwest past Spörer. The interior floor is relatively featureless, although the small crater Gyldén K is located just to the southeast of the midpoint.

== Satellite craters ==
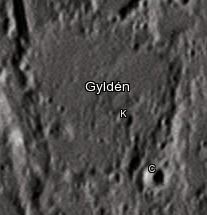
Gyldén crater and its satellite craters taken from Earth in 2012 at the University of Hertfordshire's Bayfordbury Observatory with the telescopes Meade LX200 14" and Lumenera Skynyx 2-1

By convention these features are identified on lunar maps by placing the letter on the side of the crater midpoint that is closest to Gyldén.

Gyldén	Latitude	Longitude	Diameter
C	5.8° S	1.0° E	6 km
K	5.5° S	0.6° E	5 km

== See also ==
- 806 Gyldénia, minor planet
