= Flammarion (lunar crater) =

Crater on the Moon

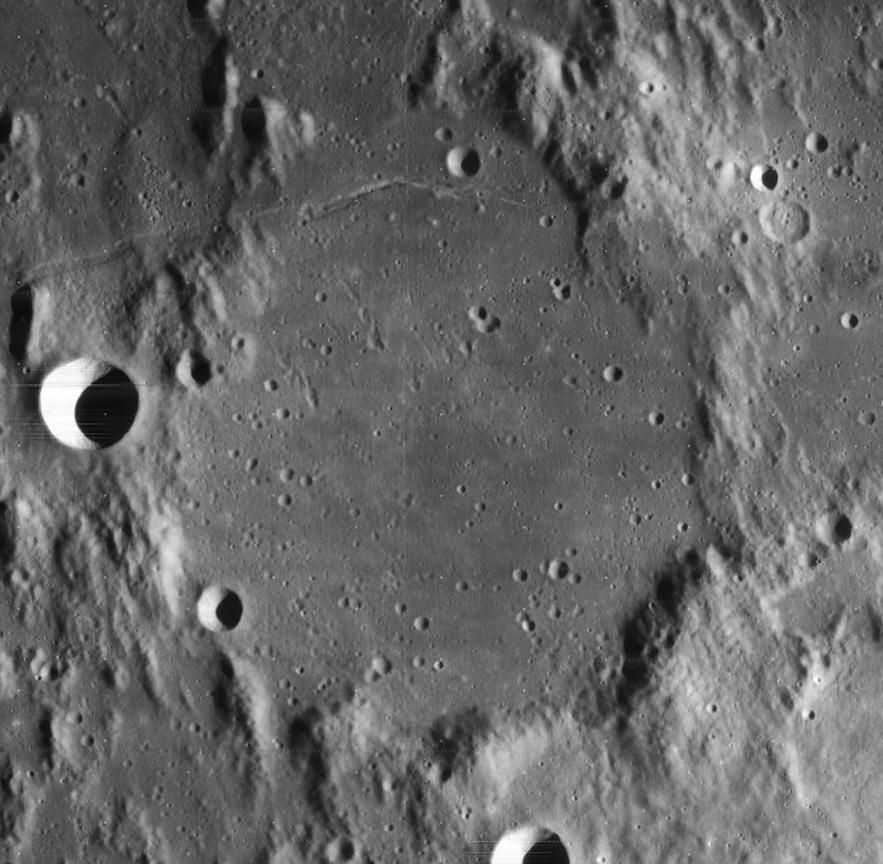
- Lunar Orbiter 4 image
- Coordinates: 3.4°S 3.7°W
- Diameter: 76.18 km (47.34 mi)
- Depth: 1.5 km (0.93 mi)
- Colongitude: 4° at sunrise
- Eponym: Camille Flammarion

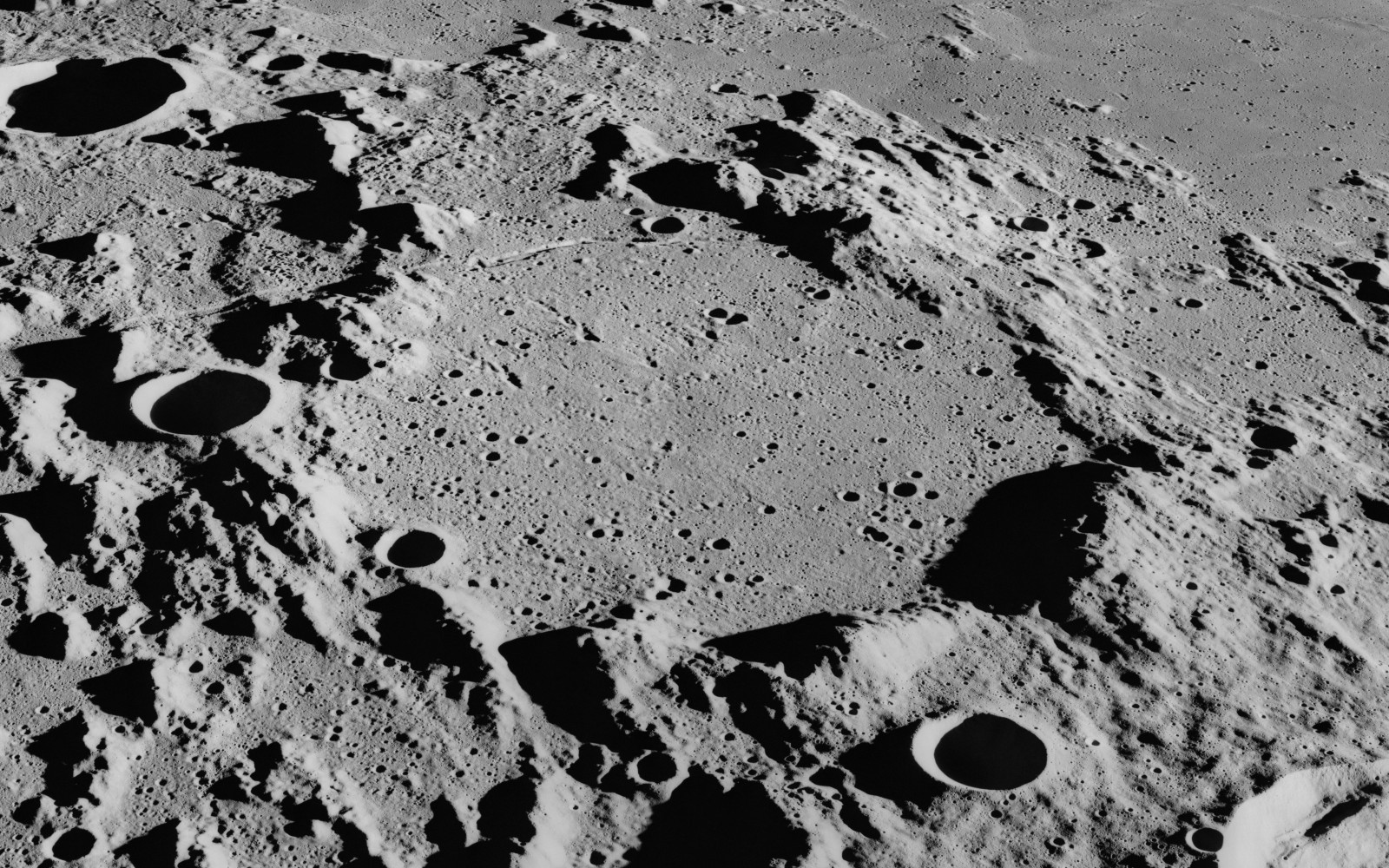
Oblique view from Apollo 16

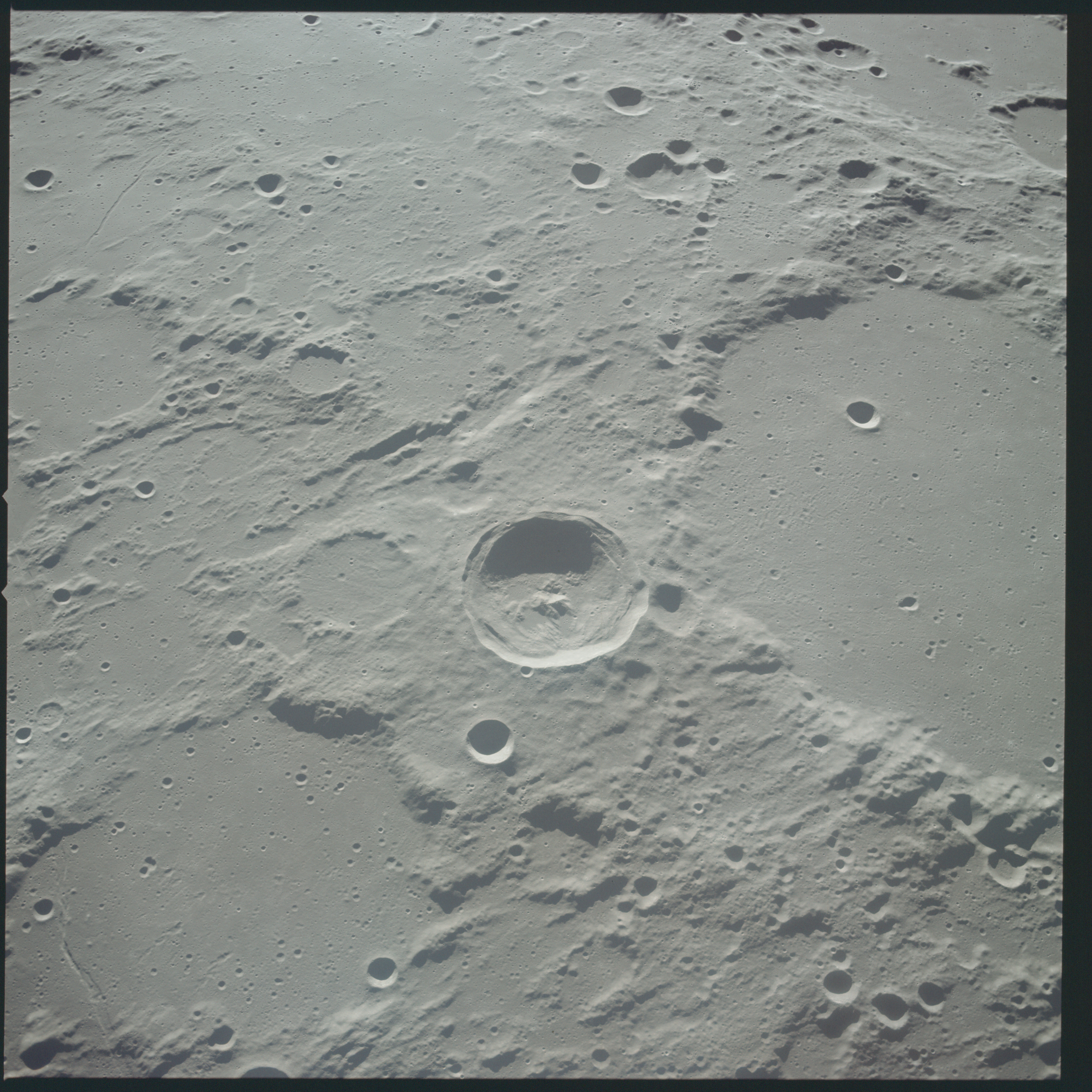
Oblique view from Apollo 12, with Herschel at center and Flammarion in lower left

Flammarion is a degraded lunar impact crater on the south edge of Sinus Medii. Its diameter is 76 km. Flammarion is located between the crater Mösting to the northwest and Herschel to the southeast. The bowl-shaped Mösting A intersects the western rim of Flammarion.

The worn outer wall of Flammarion is broken in the northwest, and the remainder is eroded and damaged. The most intact section of the wall lies to the southeast. A rille designated Rima Flammarion lies across the gap in the northwest rim, extending about 50 kilometers to the west-southwest. (This is an extension of Rima Oppolzer to the west.) The crater floor has been flooded by lava basalt, and is relatively smooth with only a few scattered craterlets to mark the surface.

This formation is named after French astronomer Camille Flammarion (1842-1925). Its designation was formally adopted by the International Astronomical Union in 1935.

== Satellite craters ==
By convention these features are identified on lunar maps by placing the letter on the side of the crater midpoint that is closest to Flammarion.

Flammarion	Latitude	Longitude	Diameter
A	1.9° S	2.5° W	4 km
B	4.0° S	4.5° W	6 km
C	2.0° S	3.7° W	5 km
D	3.0° S	4.8° W	5 km
T	2.9° S	2.1° W	34 km
U	3.0° S	1.4° W	10 km
W	2.1° S	2.4° W	7 km
X	2.9° S	3.0° W	3 km
Y	3.7° S	3.2° W	3 km
Z	2.2° S	1.4° W	4 km

== See also ==
- Flammarion (Martian crater)
- 1021 Flammario, asteroid
