= Flammarion (Martian crater) =

Crater on Mars

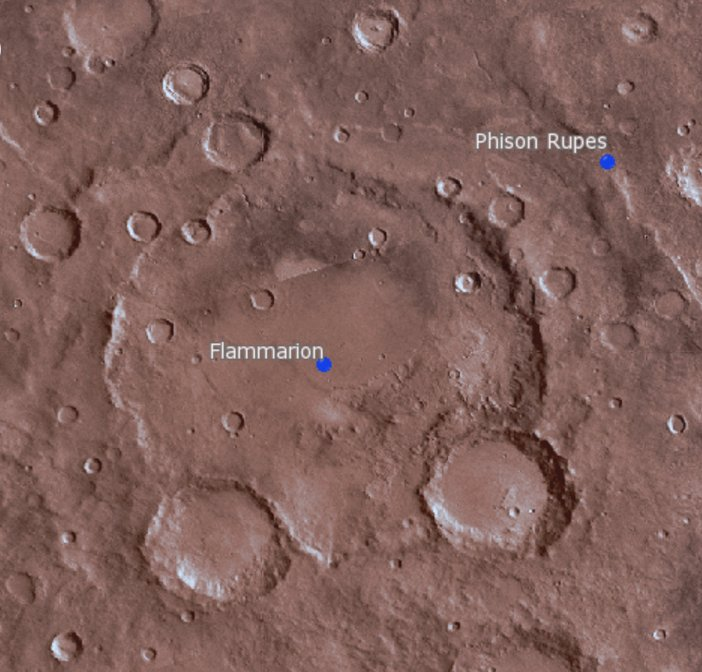
- Location of Flammarion crater
- Planet: Mars
- Region: Syrtis Major quadrangle
- Coordinates: 25.2°N 48.3°E
- Quadrangle: Syrtis Major
- Diameter: 173 km
- Eponym: Camille Flammarion

Flammarion is an impact crater in the Syrtis Major quadrangle on Mars at 25.2 ° N and 48.3 ° E. It is 173.0 km in diameter. Its name was approved in 1973, and refers to French astronomer Camille Flammarion. There may have been a lake in the crater in the past because a channel is present on the northern rim, and sedimentary layers are present within the crater.

== Description ==
Many places on Mars show rocks arranged in layers. Rock can form layers in a variety of ways. Volcanoes, wind, or water can produce layers. Sometimes the layers are of different colors. Light-toned rocks on Mars have been associated with hydrated minerals like sulfates. The Mars rover Opportunity examined such layers close-up with several instruments. Some layers are probably made up of fine particles because they seem to break up into fine dust. Other layers break up into large boulders so they are probably much harder. Basalt, a volcanic rock, is thought to be present in the layers that form boulders. Basalt has been identified on Mars in many places. Instruments on orbiting spacecraft have detected clay (also called phyllosilicate) in some layers. Recent research with an orbiting near-infrared spectrometer, which reveals the types of minerals present based on the wavelengths of light they absorb, found evidence of layers of both clay and sulfates in many places, especially craters. This is exactly what would appear if a large lake had slowly evaporated. Moreover, since some layers contain gypsum, a sulfate which forms in relatively fresh water, life could have formed in some craters.

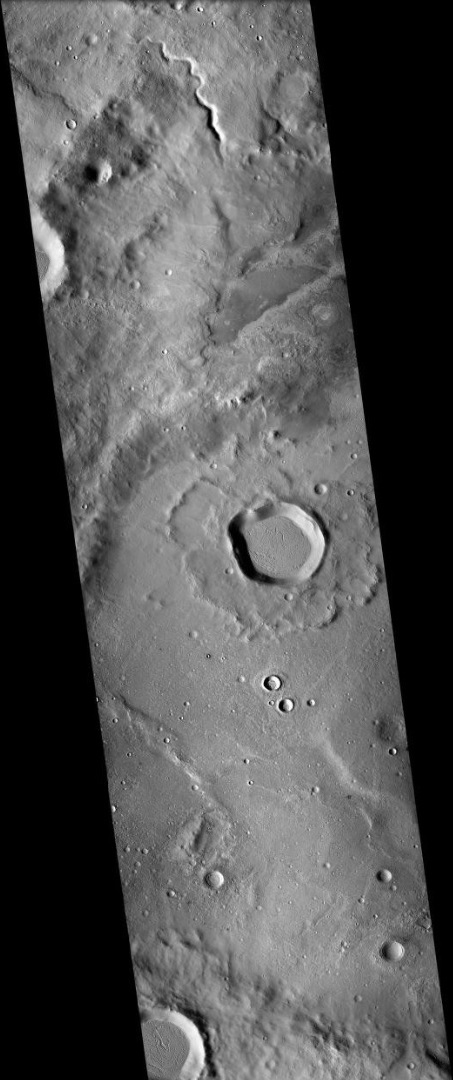
Flammarion crater, as seen by CTX. A small channel is visible on the northern wall (top).

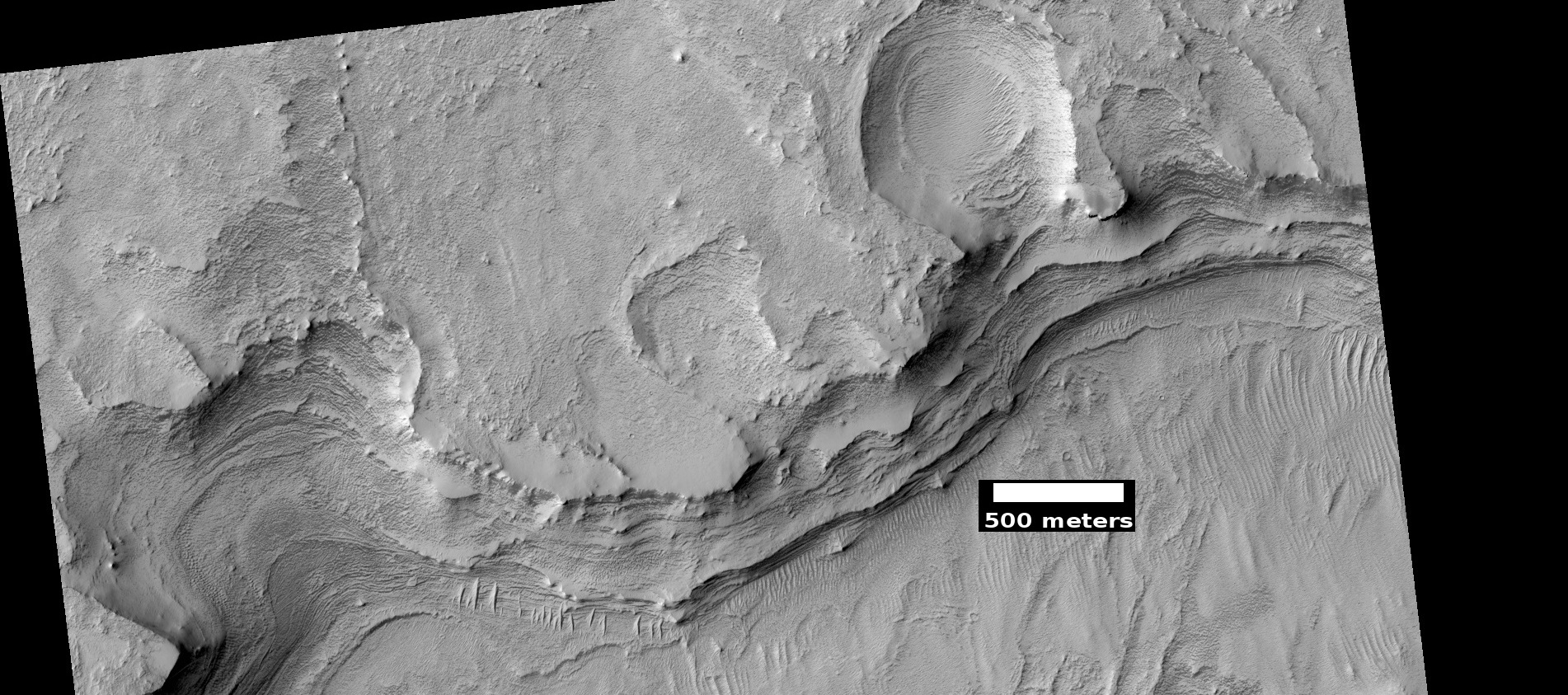
Layers in wall of Flammarion crater, as seen by HiRISE under the HiWish program.

== See also ==
- List of craters on Mars: A-G
