= Horrocks (crater) =

Crater on the Moon

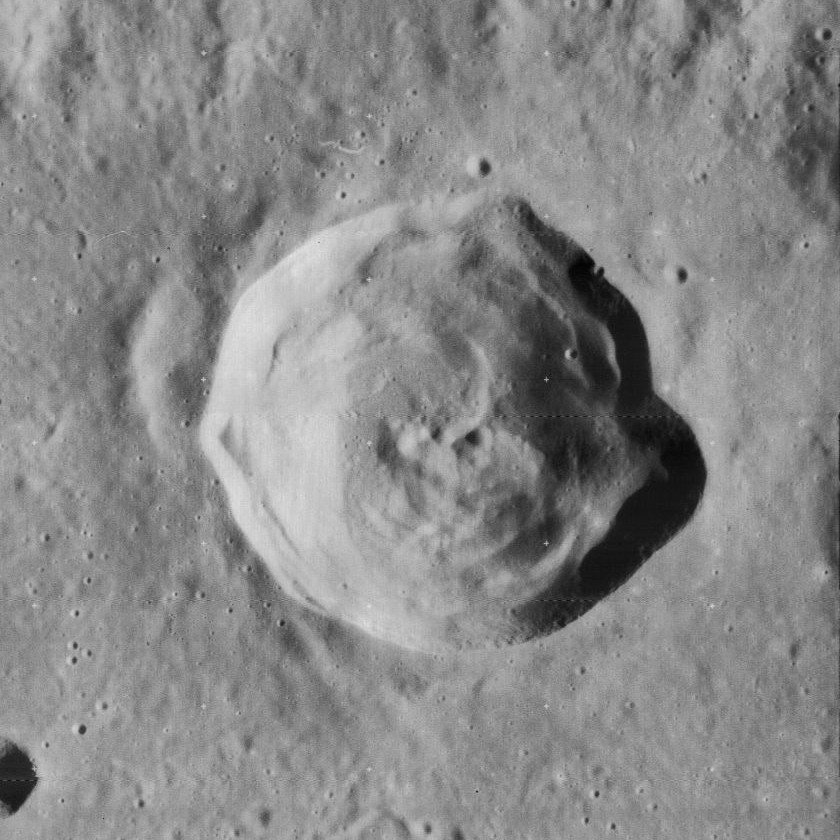
- Lunar Orbiter 4 image
- Coordinates: 4.0°S 5.9°E
- Diameter: 30 km (19 mi)
- Depth: 2.81 km (1.75 mi)
- Colongitude: 355° at sunrise
- Eponym: Jeremiah Horrocks

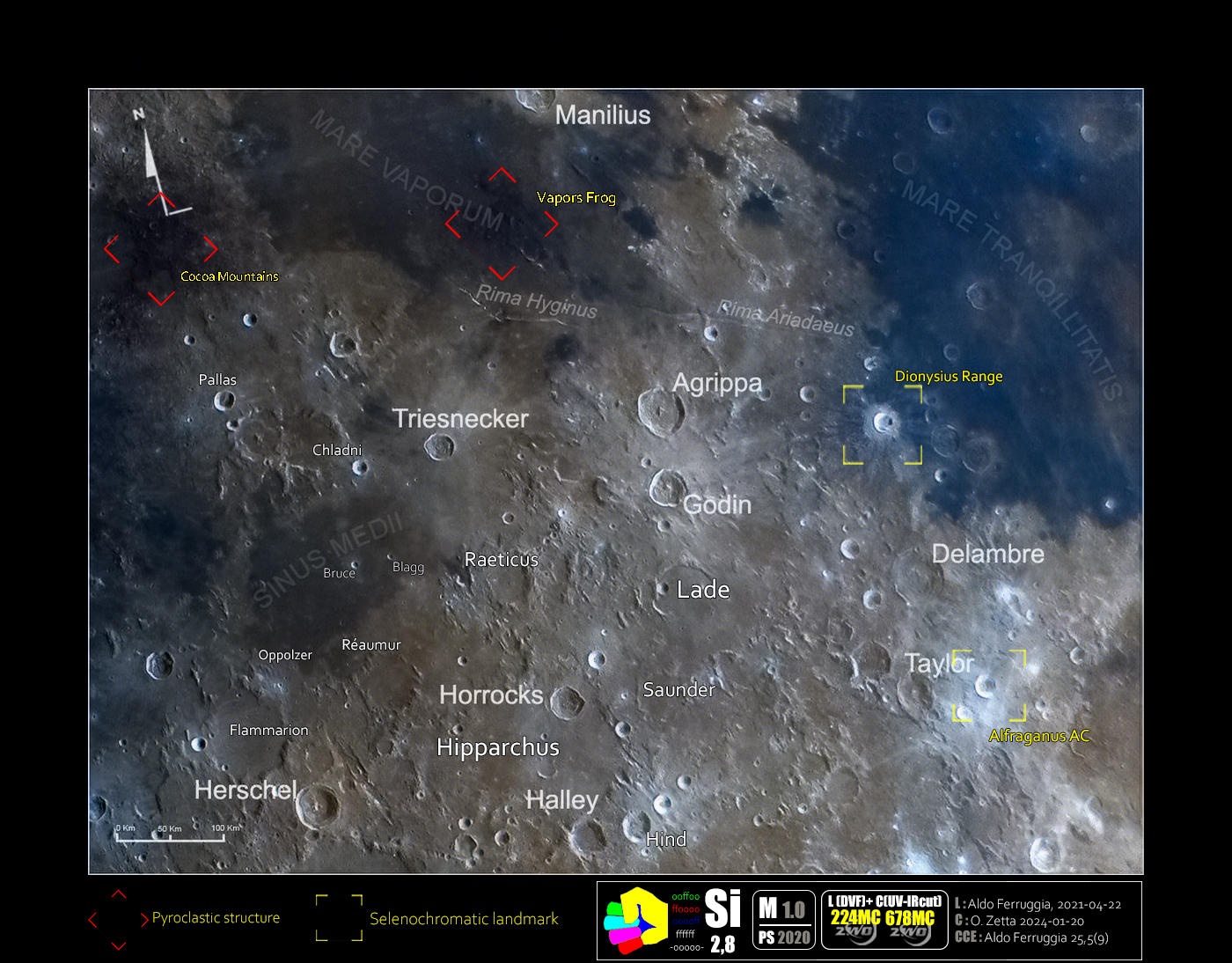
Horrocks crater and closer craters with mineral postprocessing

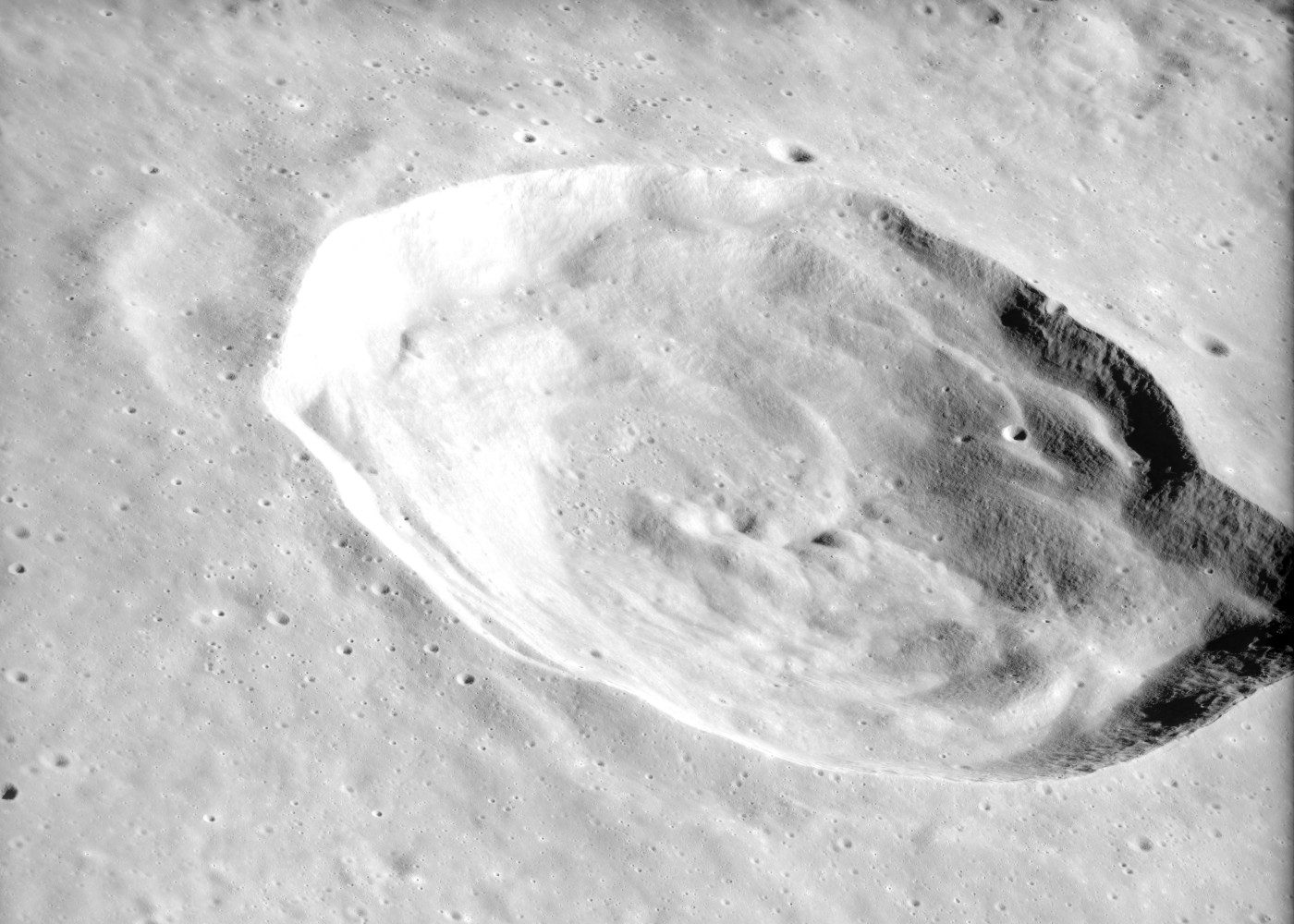
Oblique view from Apollo 16

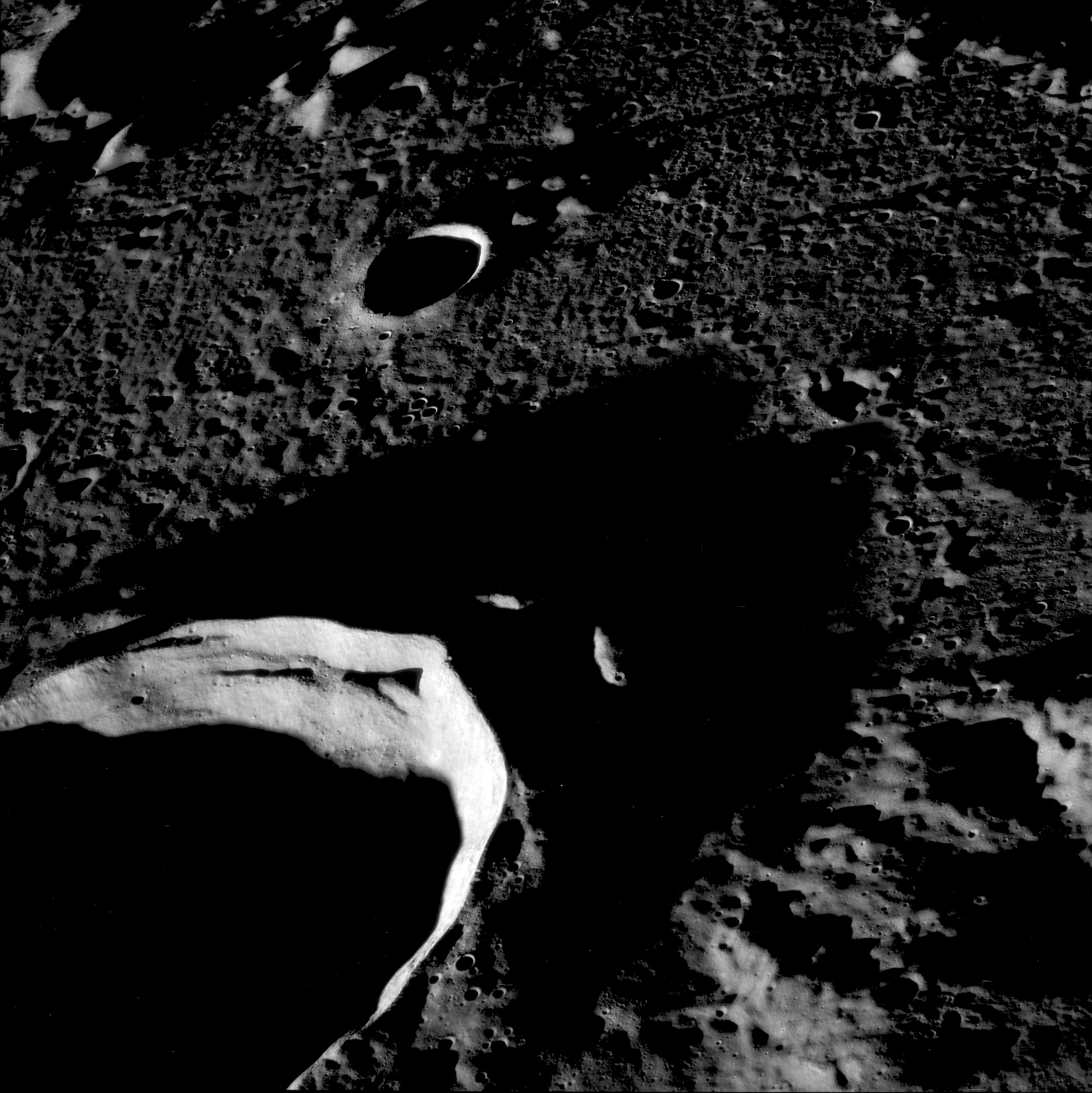
Horrocks at the terminator from Apollo 11

Horrocks is a lunar impact crater located entirely within the eroded northeast rim of the much larger walled plain named Hipparchus. Its diameter is 30 kilometres (19 mi). It was named after the 17th-century English astronomer Jeremiah Horrocks. To the south of Horrocks are the craters Halley and Hind, Rhaeticus is to the north, and Pickering to the northeast. Gyldén and Saunder lie to the west and east, respectively.

The rim of Horrocks is somewhat irregular and polygonal, particularly with an outward protrusion on the eastern rim. It has a small outer ridge. The inner wall is slumped, particularly along the northwest where it forms a heap of talus. The interior floor is uneven, and it has a central mountain and hills. The crater is approximately 30 kilometres (19 mi) in diameter and 3 kilometres (1.9 mi) deep. It is from the Eratosthenian period, which lasted from 3.2 to 1.1 billion years ago.

== Satellite craters ==
By convention these features are identified on lunar maps by placing the letter on the side of the crater midpoint that is closest to Horrocks.

Horrocks	Latitude	Longitude	Diameter
M	4.0° S	7.6° E	5 km
U	3.2° S	4.8° E	4 km
