= Saunder =

Saunder could refer to:

- Samuel Arthur Saunder (1852–1912), British mathematician and selenegrapher
- Saunder (crater), a crater on the Moon, named after Samuel Arthur Saunder

== See also ==
- Saunders, a surname
