= Pickering (lunar crater) =

Crater on the Moon

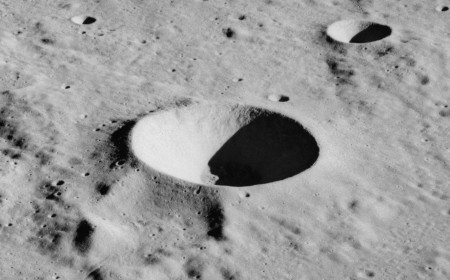
- Oblique Apollo 16 image
- Coordinates: 2.9°S 7.0°E
- Diameter: 15 km
- Depth: 2.74 km
- Colongitude: 353° at sunrise
- Eponym: Edward C. Pickering and William H. Pickering

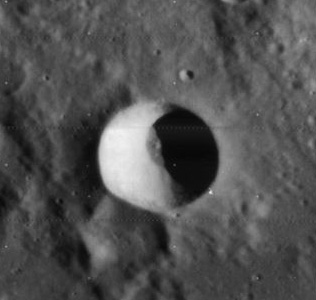
Lunar Orbiter 4 image

Pickering is a small lunar impact crater located to the northeast of a worn walled plain named Hipparchus in the central region of the Moon. It was named after American astronomers Edward Charles Pickering and William Henry Pickering. It lies more than 25 km northeast of the crater Horrocks, which lies within Hipparchus. To the southeast is the lava-flooded Saunder.

Pickering is a bowl-shaped formation with a circular rim that has received little wear. It has a ray system that extends for about 160 kilometers.

== Bright Pickering during full moon ==
Pickering is an eye-catching formation during full moon. The inner slopes of this bowl-shaped crater look like the white iris of a staring eye. The dark floor looks like the pupil. The brightness of Pickering is also noticeable on the photographic version of chart LAC 77 (page 154) in The Clementine Atlas of the Moon (Ben Bussey / Paul D. Spudis). To the south-southeast of Pickering, bowl-shaped crater Hipparchus C shows the same brightness.

== Satellite craters ==
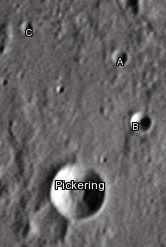
Pickering crater and its satellite craters taken from Earth in 2012 at the University of Hertfordshire's Bayfordbury Observatory with the telescopes Meade LX200 14" and Lumenera Skynyx 2-1

By convention these features are identified on lunar maps by placing the letter on the side of the crater midpoint that is closest to Pickering.

Pickering	Latitude	Longitude	Diameter
A	1.5° S	7.1° E	5 km
B	2.1° S	7.4° E	6 km
C	1.5° S	6.1° E	4 km

== See also ==
- Asteroid 784 Pickeringia
