= Hermann Klein =

Hermann Klein may refer to:

- Herman Klein (1856–1934), English music critic, author and teacher of singing
- Hermann Joseph Klein (1844–1914), German astronomer, author and professor
