= Halley (lunar crater) =

Crater on the Moon

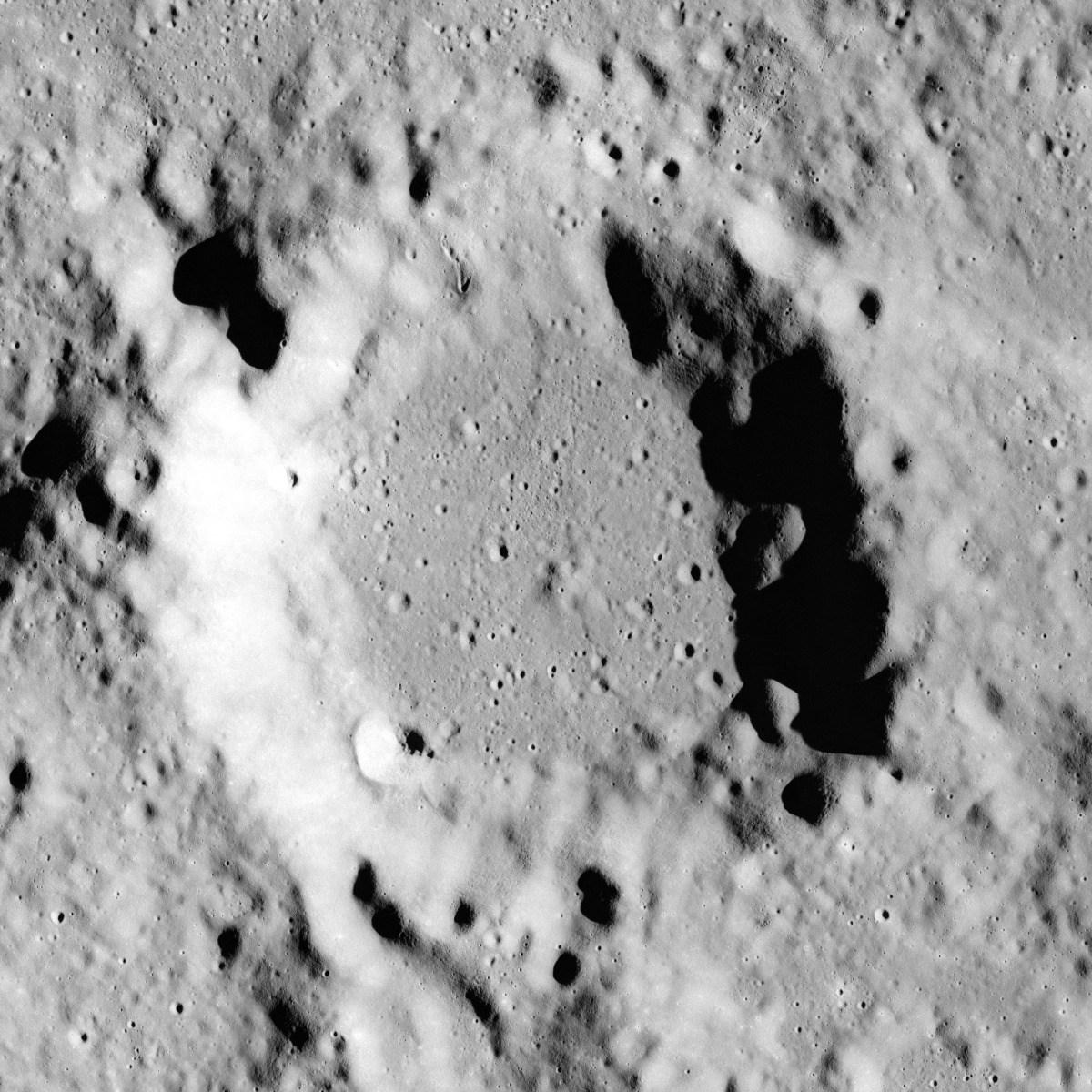
- Apollo 16 image
- Coordinates: 8.0°S 5.7°E
- Diameter: 34.59 km (21.49 mi)
- Depth: 2.49 km (1.55 mi)
- Colongitude: 355° at sunrise
- Eponym: Edmond Halley

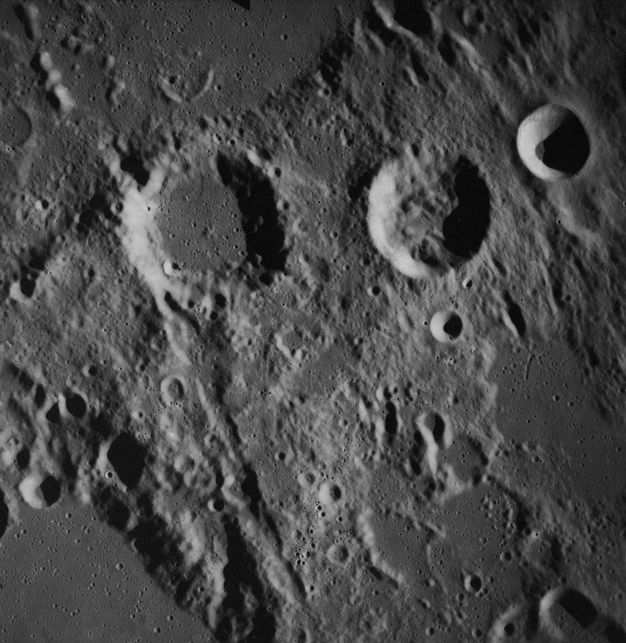
Hind (upper right centre) and Halley (upper left centre) from Apollo 16. At top right is Hipparchus C. Hind C is south of Hind. NASA photo.

Halley is a lunar impact crater that is intruding into the southern wall of a walled plain named Hipparchus. Its diameter is 35 km. To the southwest of Halley is the large crater Albategnius, and due east lies the slightly smaller Hind.

The rim of Halley is somewhat worn, the east being scoured by debris from the Imbrium basin, hence forming part of the Imbrium Sculpture. The interior floor of Halley is relatively flat, being filled with material of the same albedo of the surrounding terrain, and is probably melt from the Imbrium impact.

This formation is named after the English astronomer Edmond Halley (1656-1742). On the 1645 map by Michael van Langren, the crater is called Gansii, for the gansa (a kind of wild swan) of Francis Godwin's The Man in the Moone. Its modern designation was formally adopted by the International Astronomical Union in 1935.

== Satellite craters ==
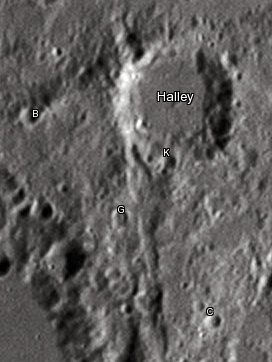
Halley and its satellite features as seen from Earth

By convention these features are identified on lunar maps by placing the letter on the side of the crater midpoint that is closest to Halley.

Halley	Latitude	Longitude	Diameter
B	8.5° S	4.5° E	6 km
C	8.9° S	6.6° E	5 km
G	9.1° S	5.6° E	5 km
K	8.6° S	5.9° E	5 km
