= Klein (crater) =

Crater on the Moon

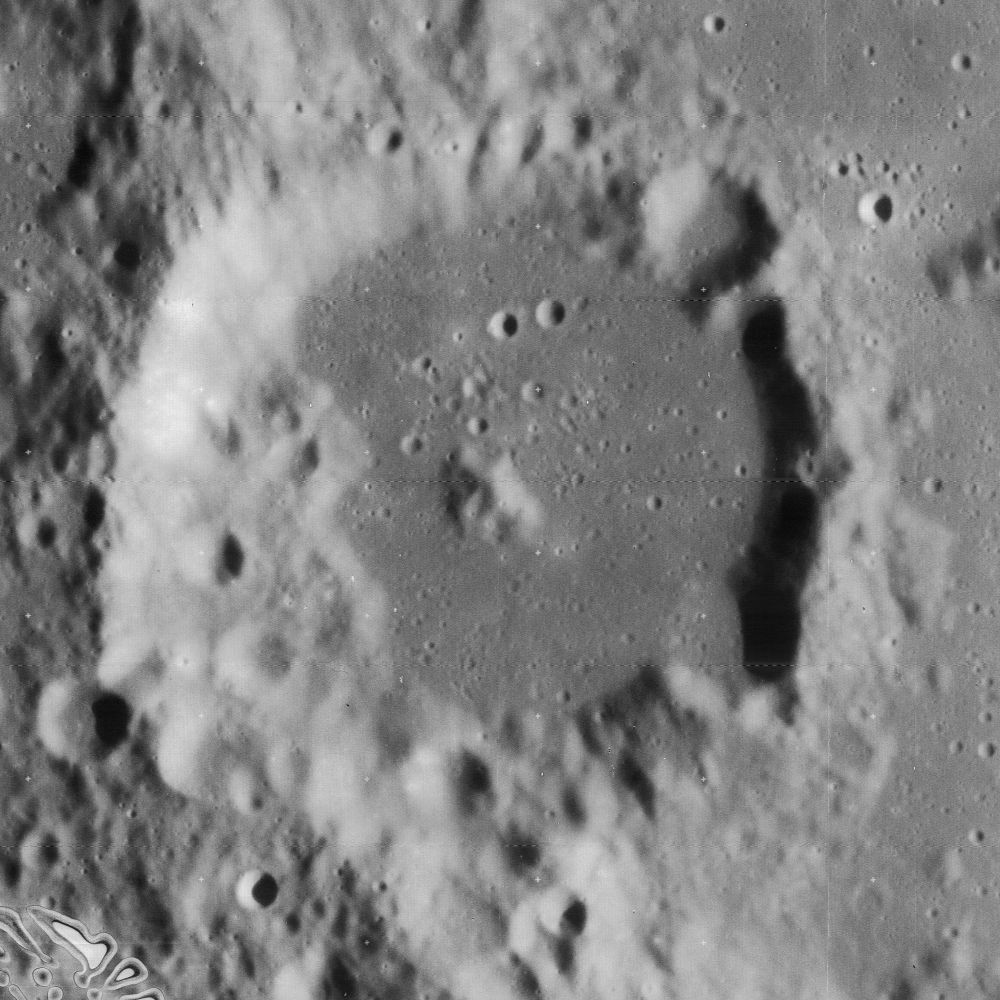
- Lunar Orbiter 4 image
- Coordinates: 12.0°S 2.6°E
- Diameter: 44 km
- Depth: 1.5 km
- Colongitude: 1° at sunrise
- Eponym: Hermann J. Klein

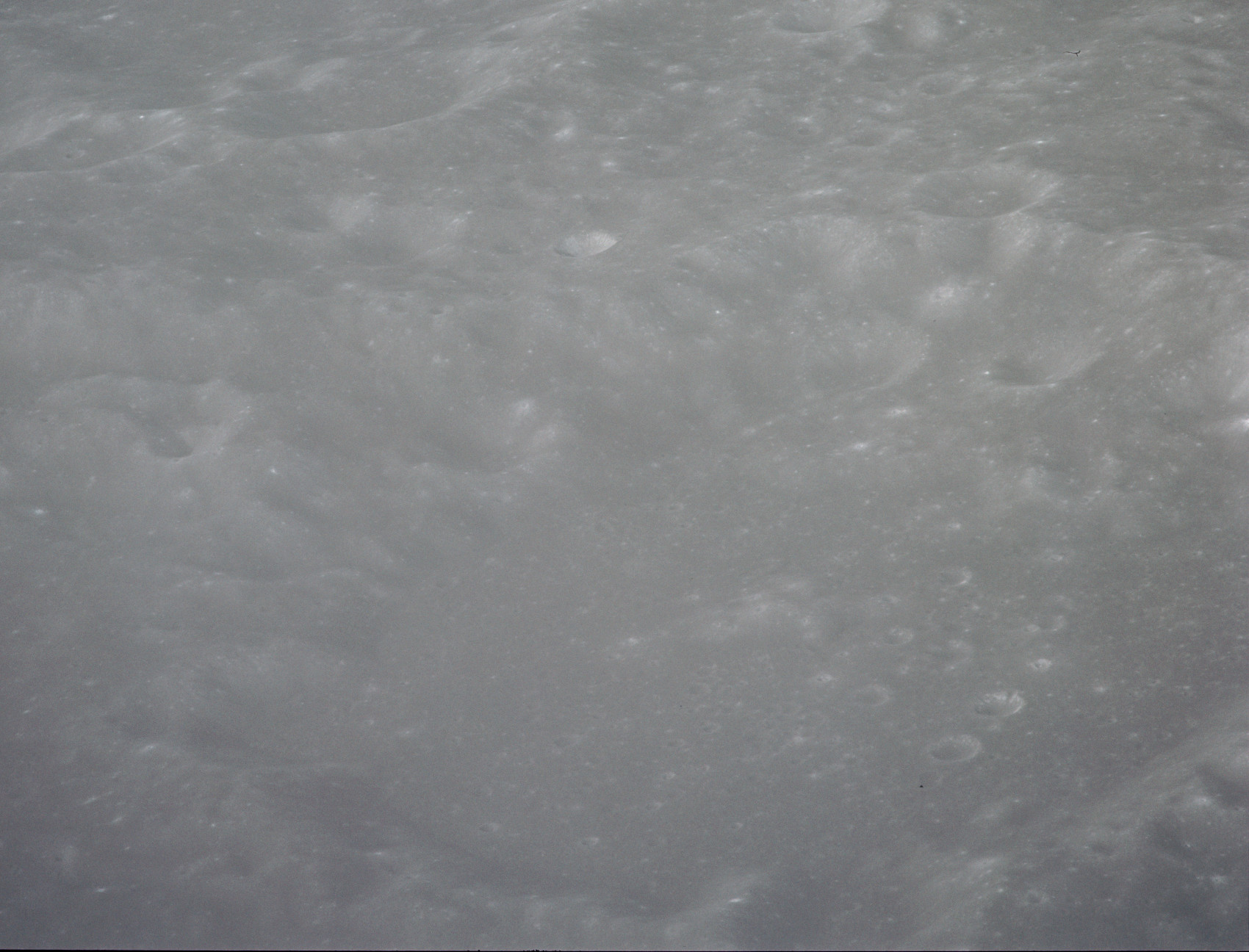
Oblique view from Apollo 14

Klein is a lunar impact crater that is located across the western rim of the larger crater Albategnius, in the central highlands region of the Moon. The crater is named after German astronomer Hermann Joseph Klein.

The rim of Klein has been worn and incised by a history of impacts, and the western rim is larger than the remainder. There are low saddles in both the northern and southern parts of the rim, and the crater Klein A cuts through the northeast rim. The floor has been covered and smoothed by a lava flow, and there is a small central peak.

== Satellite craters ==
By convention these features are identified on lunar maps by placing the letter on the side of the crater midpoint that is closest to Klein.

Klein	Latitude	Longitude	Diameter
A	11.4° S	3.0° E	9 km
B	12.5° S	1.8° E	6 km
C	12.5° S	2.6° E	6 km
