= Hipparchus (lunar crater) =

Crater on the Moon

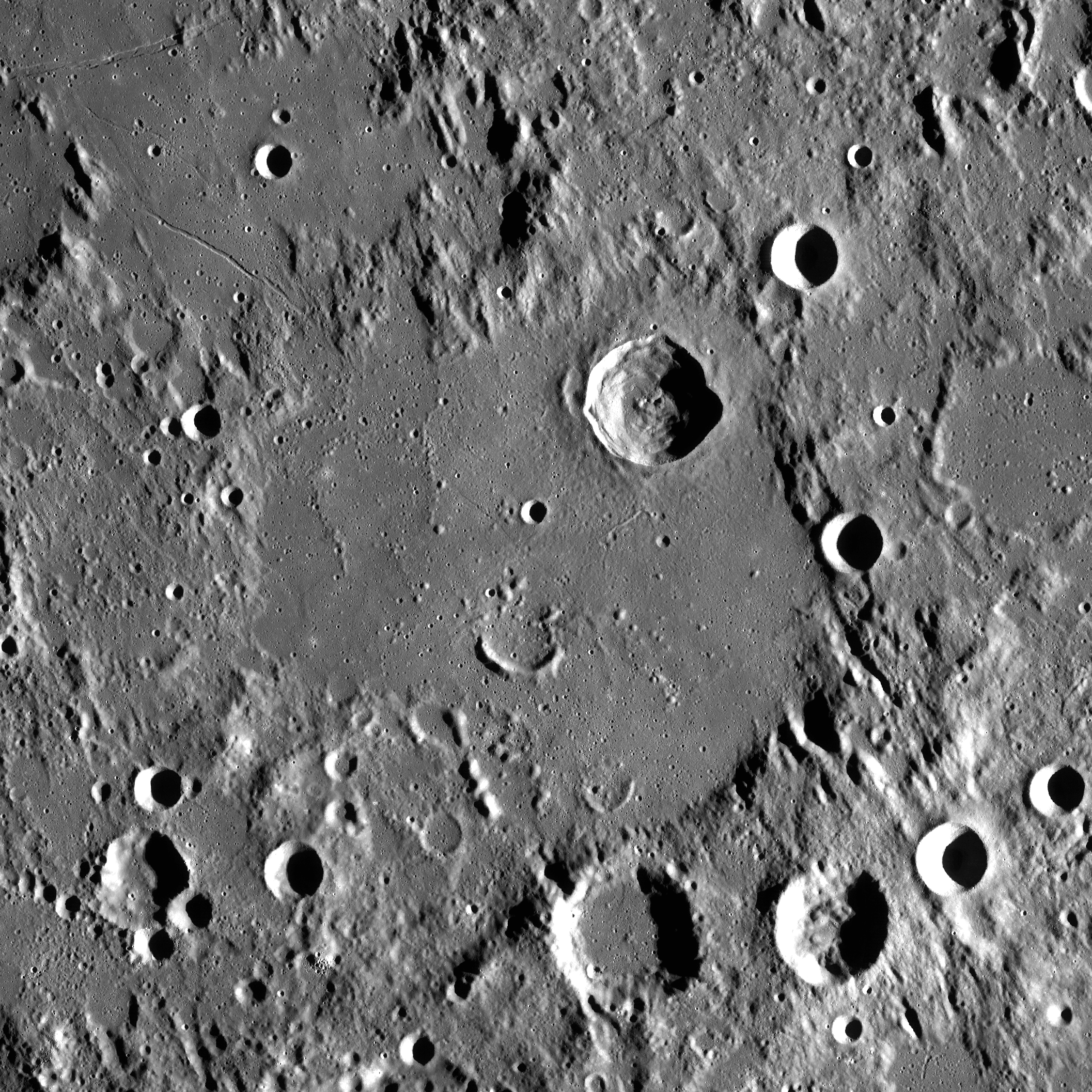
- LRO image of Hipparchus
- Coordinates: 5.5°S 4.8°E
- Diameter: 150 km
- Depth: 1.1 km
- Colongitude: 354° at sunrise
- Formation: Pre-Nectarian
- Eponym: Hipparchus

Hipparchus is the degraded remnant of a lunar impact crater. It was named after the Greek astronomer, geographer and mathematician Hipparchus. It is located to the southeast of Sinus Medii, near the center of the visible Moon. To the south is the prominent crater Albategnius, and to the southwest lies Ptolemaeus, a feature of comparable dimensions to Hipparchus. Horrocks lies entirely within the northeast rim of the crater. Halley is attached to the south rim, and Hind lies to the southeast. To the north-northeast is the bowl-shaped Pickering, and the flooded Saunder is located off the northeast rim. High-resolution images of Hipparchus were obtained by Lunar Orbiter 5 in 1967.

== Description ==
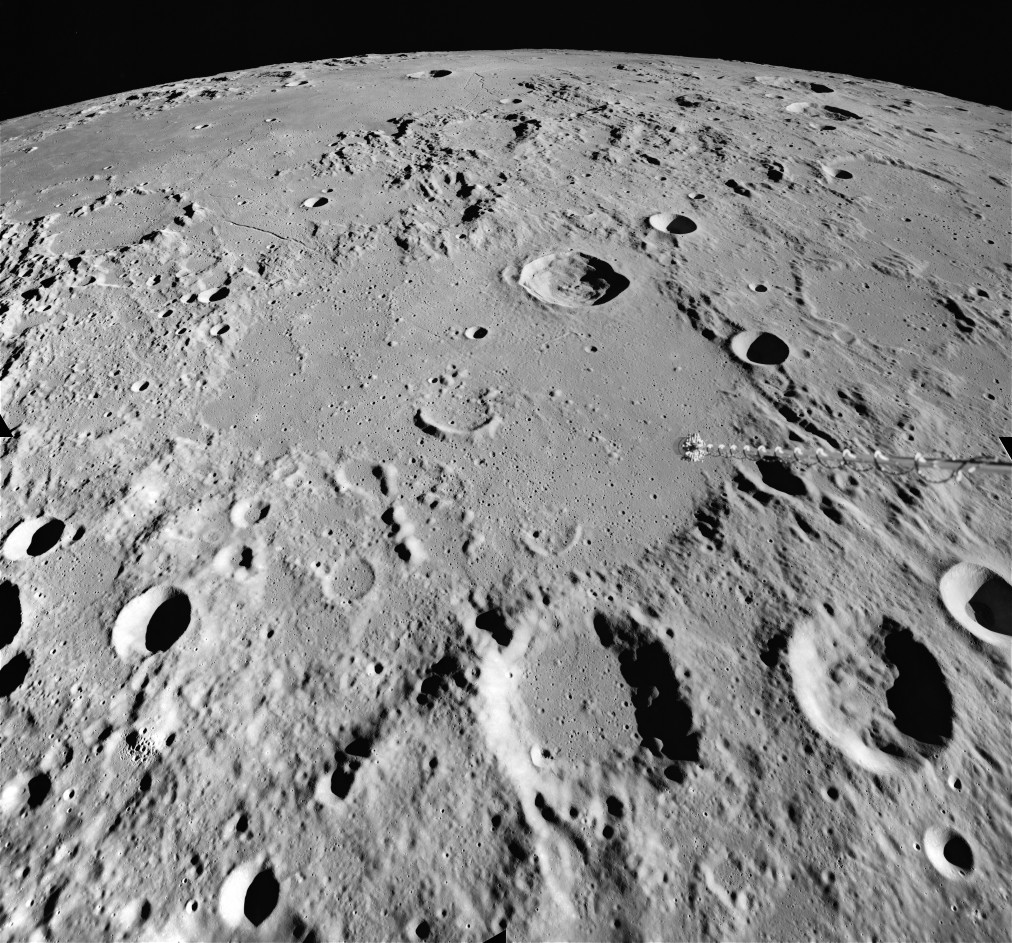
Hipparchus seen by Apollo 16

This feature is an ancient crater that has been subject to considerable modification due to subsequent impacts. The western rim of Hipparchus has been all but worn away from impact erosion, and only low hills and rises in the surface remain to outline the feature. The wall to the east is somewhat more intact, but it too is heavily worn. A pair of deep clefts lie in the western wall. These parallel a sets of scars running through the south-central highlands. The crater floor has been partially resurfaced by basaltic lava flow. The southwest part of the floor, however, is slightly raised and much more rugged than the remainder. A few small rises and the raised partial rim of a flooded crater are all that remain of a central massif. Gaps in the northwest rim of Hipparchus form valleys that connect with the mare to the northwest. A rille named Rima Réaumur runs from this site to the outer wall of Réaumur.

== Satellite craters ==
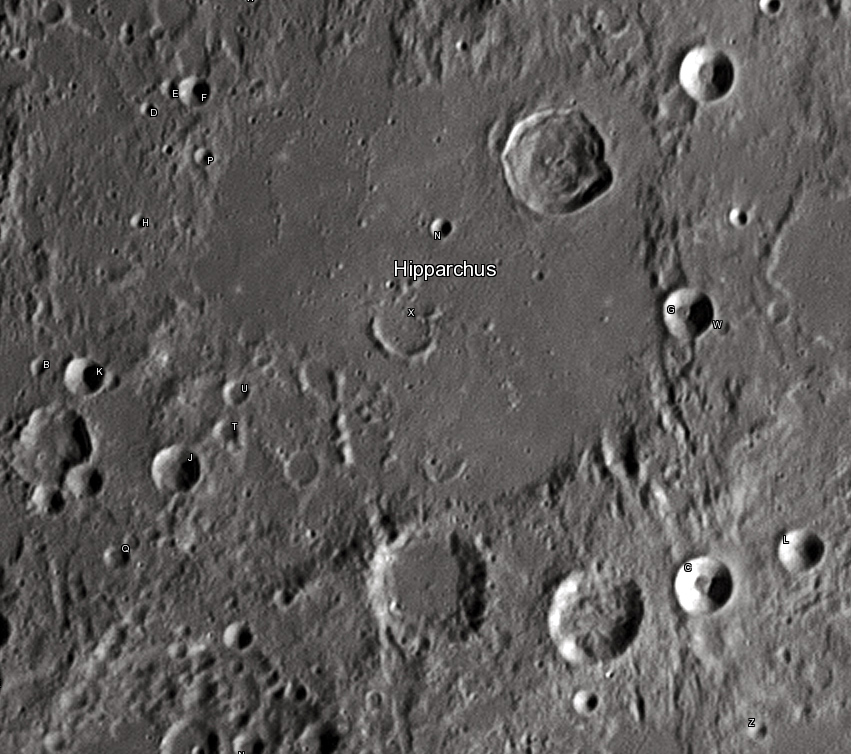
Hipparchus crater and its satellite craters taken from Earth in 2012 at the University of Hertfordshire's Bayfordbury Observatory with the telescopes Meade LX200 14" and Lumenera Skynyx 2-1

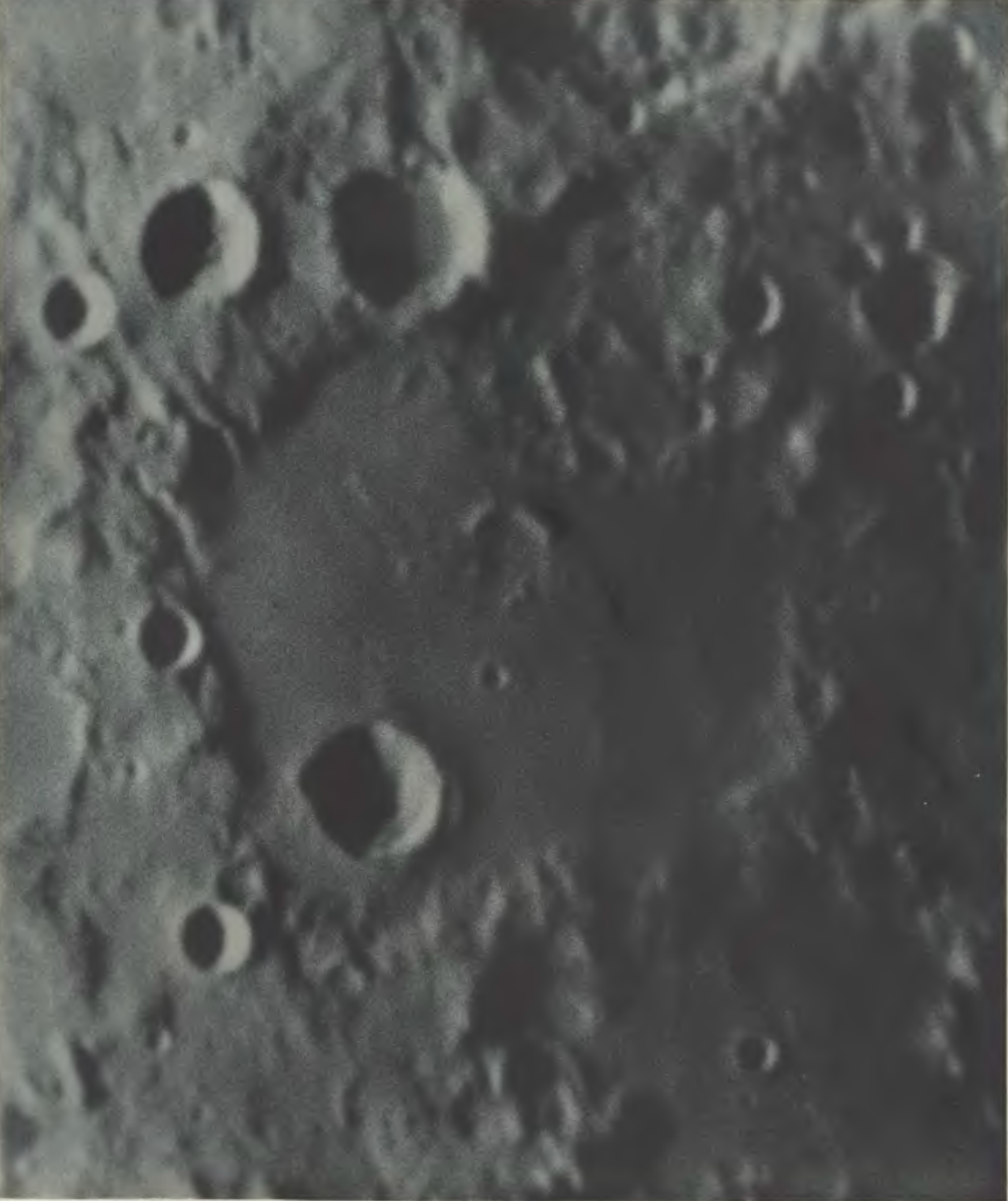
Hipparchus and its surrounding satellite craters in Weinek's Lunar Atlas (1898); North is faced downward

By convention these features are identified on lunar maps by placing the letter on the side of the crater midpoint that is closest to Hipparchus.

Hipparchus	Latitude	Longitude	Diameter
B	6.9° S	1.7° E	5 km
C	7.3° S	8.2° E	17 km
D	4.5° S	2.1° E	5 km
E	4.2° S	2.3° E	5 km
F	4.2° S	2.5° E	9 km
G	5.0° S	7.4° E	15 km
H	5.4° S	2.3° E	5 km
J	7.6° S	3.2° E	14 km
K	6.9° S	2.2° E	12 km
L	6.8° S	9.0° E	13 km
N	4.8° S	5.0° E	6 km
P	4.7° S	2.8° E	5 km
Q	8.5° S	2.9° E	8 km
T	7.1° S	3.6° E	8 km
U	6.7° S	3.6° E	8 km
W	5.0° S	7.8° E	5 km
X	5.7° S	4.9° E	17 km
Z	8.5° S	9.1° E	6 km

== Hooke's Observations ==
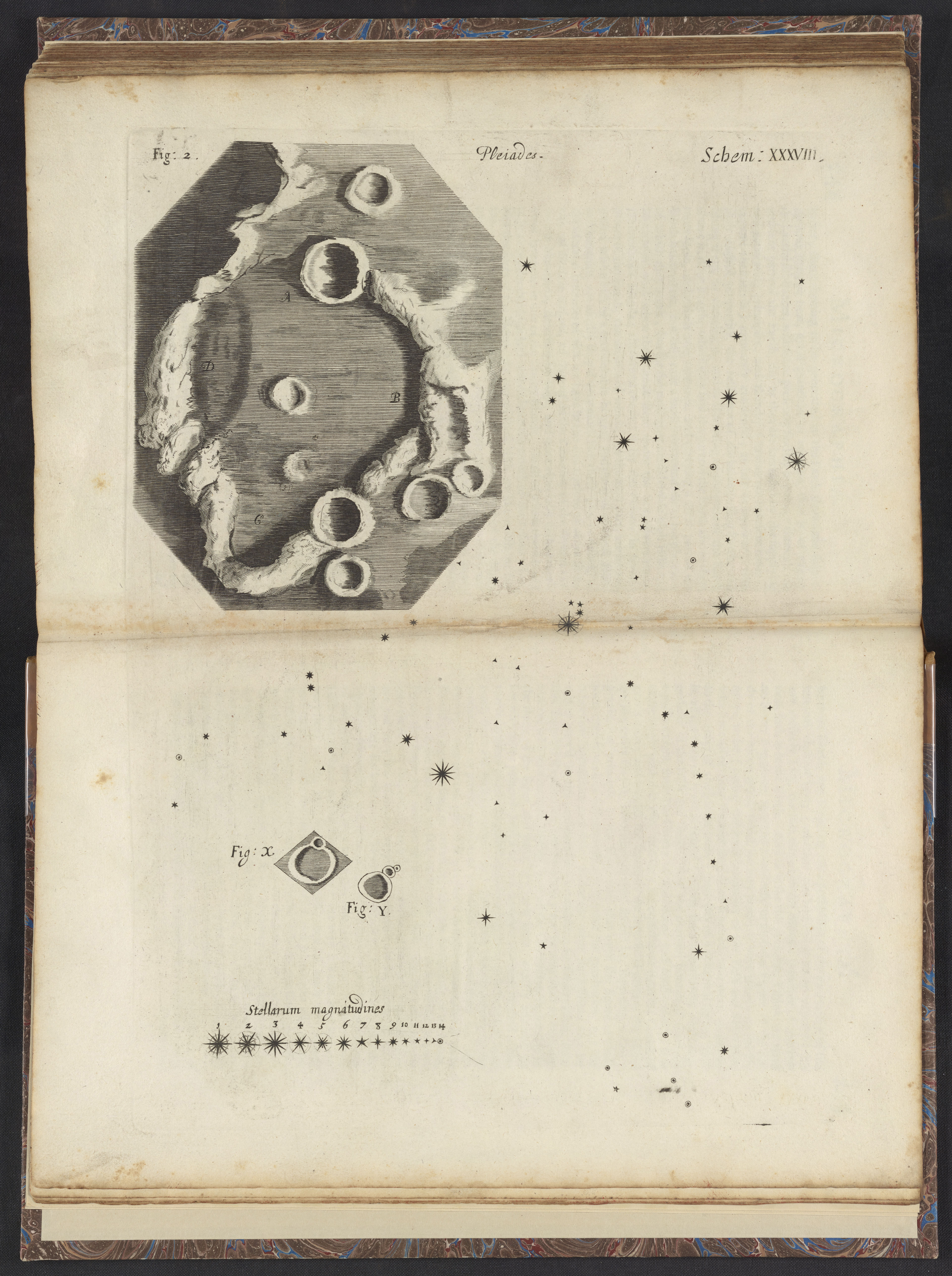
Robert Hooke's observations of the lunar crater Hipparchus, 1665

In October 1664, Robert Hooke used a 36-foot telescope to make a detailed drawing of the single crater Hipparchus and surrounding terrain, which he published as a plate in his Micrographia (1665). His drawing contained an abundance of detail, and can be considered the first high-definition illustration of an individual lunar feature. Hooke argued that its features were not fixed, but were a product of ongoing physical forces. He suggested two possible models to explain lunar crater formation: projectile bombardment from space and subterranean lunar vulcanism. Less accurately, he speculated that the crater might contain "verdant pastures" and "Vegetables analogous to our Grass, Shrubs, and Trees”.

== Hipparchus C during full moon ==
During full moon, satellite crater Hipparchus C, southeast of Hipparchus, looks very bright. The inner slopes of this bowl-shaped crater look like the white iris of a staring eye, while the dark floor looks like a pupil. The brightness of Hipparchus C is also noticeable on the photographic version of chart LAC 77 (page 154) in The Clementine Atlas of the Moon (Ben Bussey / Paul D. Spudis). Bowl-shaped crater Pickering, to the north-northwest of Hipparchus C, also shows this brightness.

== Hipparchus in fiction ==
In the original version of the 1954 Tintin book Explorers on the Moon (On a marché sur la lune), the crew lands on Hipparchus.

== See also ==
- Asteroid 4000 Hipparchus
