= William Henry Pickering =

American astronomer (1858–1938)

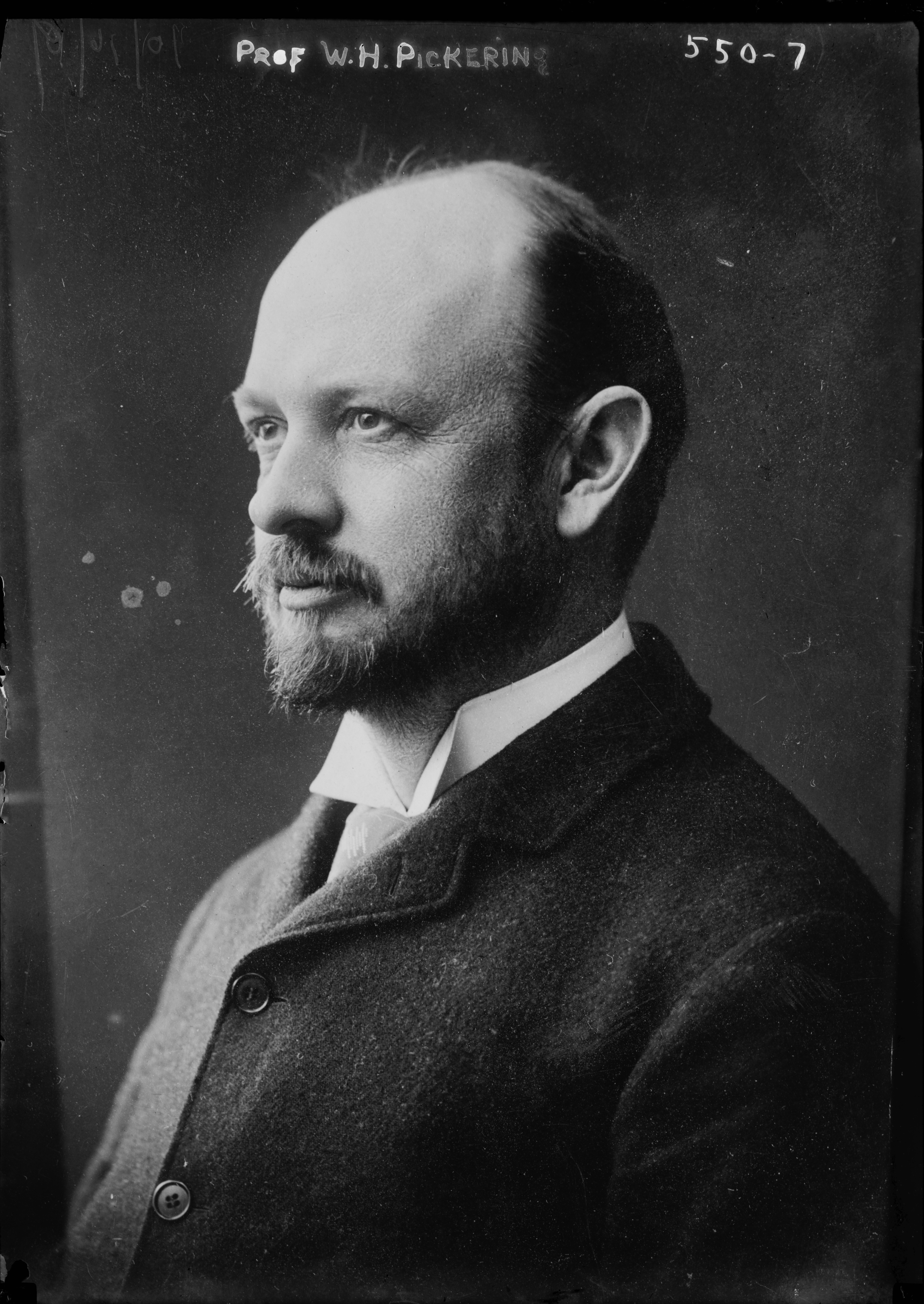
- Pickering in 1909
- Born: February 15, 1858; Boston, Massachusetts, US
- Died: January 16, 1938 (aged 79); Mandeville, Jamaica
- Education: Massachusetts Institute of Technology (1897)
- Relatives: Edward Charles Pickering (brother)
- Awards: Lalande Prize (1905); Prix Jules Janssen (1909)
- Scientific career
- Fields: Astronomy

William Henry Pickering (February 15, 1858 – January 16, 1938) was an American astronomer. Pickering constructed and established several observatories or astronomical observation stations, notably including Percival Lowell's Flagstaff Observatory. He spent much of the later part of his life at his private observatory in Jamaica.

== Early life ==
William Henry Pickering was born on February 15, 1858, in Boston, Massachusetts, to Edward Pickering and Charlotte Hammond. His older brother, Edward Charles Pickering, was director of the Harvard College Observatory (HCO) from 1876 to 1919.

He attended secondary schools in Boston and Cambridge. In 1878, he published his observations of the coronal polarization of the 1878 solar eclipse in Colorado.

He graduated from the Massachusetts Institute of Technology (MIT) with a bachelor in science in 1879.

== Career ==
Pickering was an instructor in physics at MIT from 1880 to 1887. As early as 1882, pioneered in celestial photography. In 1883, he was elected a Fellow of the American Academy of Arts and Sciences at the age of 25.

In 1887, he became an assistant professor of astronomy at HCO, teaching there until 1893. He either led or participated in Harvard's solar eclipse expeditions in Grenada in 1886, California in 1889, Chile in 1893, Georgia in 1900, and New England in 1932. In 1888, he took some of the first photographs of Mars.

He selected the site for the Mount Wilson Observatory of Los Angeles County, California, in 1889. In 1891, he established the Boyden astronomical station for the Harvard College Observatory in Arequipa, Peru. In 1894, he set up the Lowell Observatory and telescope for Percival Lowell in Flagstaff, Arizona.

Pickering discovered Saturn's ninth moon Phoebe in 1899 from plates taken in 1898. In 1900, he established an astronomical station for the Harvard College Observatory in Mandeville, Jamaica. He produced a photographic atlas, The Moon: A Summary of the Existing Knowledge of our Satellite, in 1903. In 1905, he conducted studies of volcanic craters in Hawaii, noting their similarity to those of the moon. This was followed by similar studies in Canada, Alaska, and the Azores.

Pickering discovered a tenth Saturnian moon in 1905 from plates taken in 1904, which he called "Themis". For this discovery, he was awarded the Lalande Prize of the French Academy of Sciences in 1905. "Themis" was later shown not to exist.

Following George Darwin, he speculated in 1907 that the Moon was once a part of the Earth and that it broke away where now the Pacific Ocean lies. He also proposed a version of continental drift before Alfred Wegener where America, Asia, Africa, and Europe once formed a single continent, which broke up because of the separation of the Moon. In 1908, he made a statement regarding the possibility of airplanes that had not yet been invented, saying that "a popular fantasy is to suppose that flying machines could be used to drop dynamite on the enemy in time of war".

In 1919, he predicted the existence and position of a Planet X based on anomalies in the positions of Uranus and Neptune but a search of Mount Wilson Observatory photographs failed to find the predicted planet. Pluto was later discovered at Flagstaff by Clyde Tombaugh in 1930, but in any case, it is now known that Pluto's mass is far too small to have appreciable gravitational effects on Uranus or Neptune, and the anomalies are accounted for when today's much more accurate values of planetary masses are used in calculating orbits. When the planet was named, he interpreted its symbol as a monogram referring to himself and Lowell by the phrase "Pickering-Lowell".

He led solar eclipse expeditions and studied craters on the Moon, and hypothesized that changes in the appearance of the crater Eratosthenes were due to "lunar insects". He claimed to have found vegetation on the Moon in 1921.

In September 1923, he retired from Harvard University as an assistant professor emeritus. The Harvard observatory in Jamaica became his private facility where he continued his work. From 1928 to 1932, he published a series of papers, mostly in Popular Astronomy. Throughout his career, he published more than 450 papers and two books.

== Professional affiliations ==
Pickering was a member of the American Astronomical Society, the American Academy of Sciences, the Société astronomique de France, and the International Astronomical Union Committee on Physical Observations of the Planets and Satellites. He became a fellow in the American Academy of Arts and Sciences in 1882 and an associate of the Royal Astronomical Society on June 10, 1910. In 1893, he became an honorary member of the Royal Astronomical Society of Canada. He was also an honorary member of the British Astronomical Association.

== Awards and honors ==
He won the Prix Lalande in 1905 and the Prix Jules Janssen in 1909. He was named a chevalier the Military Order of Saint James of the Sword of Portugal and received two medals from the Societie Astronomique de Mexico.

The asteroid 784 Pickeringia, and the craters Pickering on Mars are jointly named for him and his brother. Crater W. H. Pickering on the Moon was named in his honor.

== Personal life ==
Pickering married Anne Atwood, the daughter of Isaac Butts of Boston. They had two children: William T. Pickering and Esther Pickering.

Throughout his life, Pickering was known as an avid hiker and mountaineer. He was also a charter member of the Appalachian Mountain Club, founded in 1876. In 1878, he was one of the first to scale Half Dome in Yosemite National Park. He also climbed El Misti in Peru. In 1882 he published Walking Guide to the Mt. Washington Range, arguably the first modern hiking trail guide to be published in America. The book contained a topographical trail map, which is also likely to be the first published trail map of the White Mountains. He was a member of the Harvard Travellers’ Club and the New York Authors’ Club.

In his retirement, Pickering lived in Mandeville. It was there that he died on January 16, 1938, aged 79.
