= Alfred Fowler =

English astronomer

Alfred Fowler CBE FRS
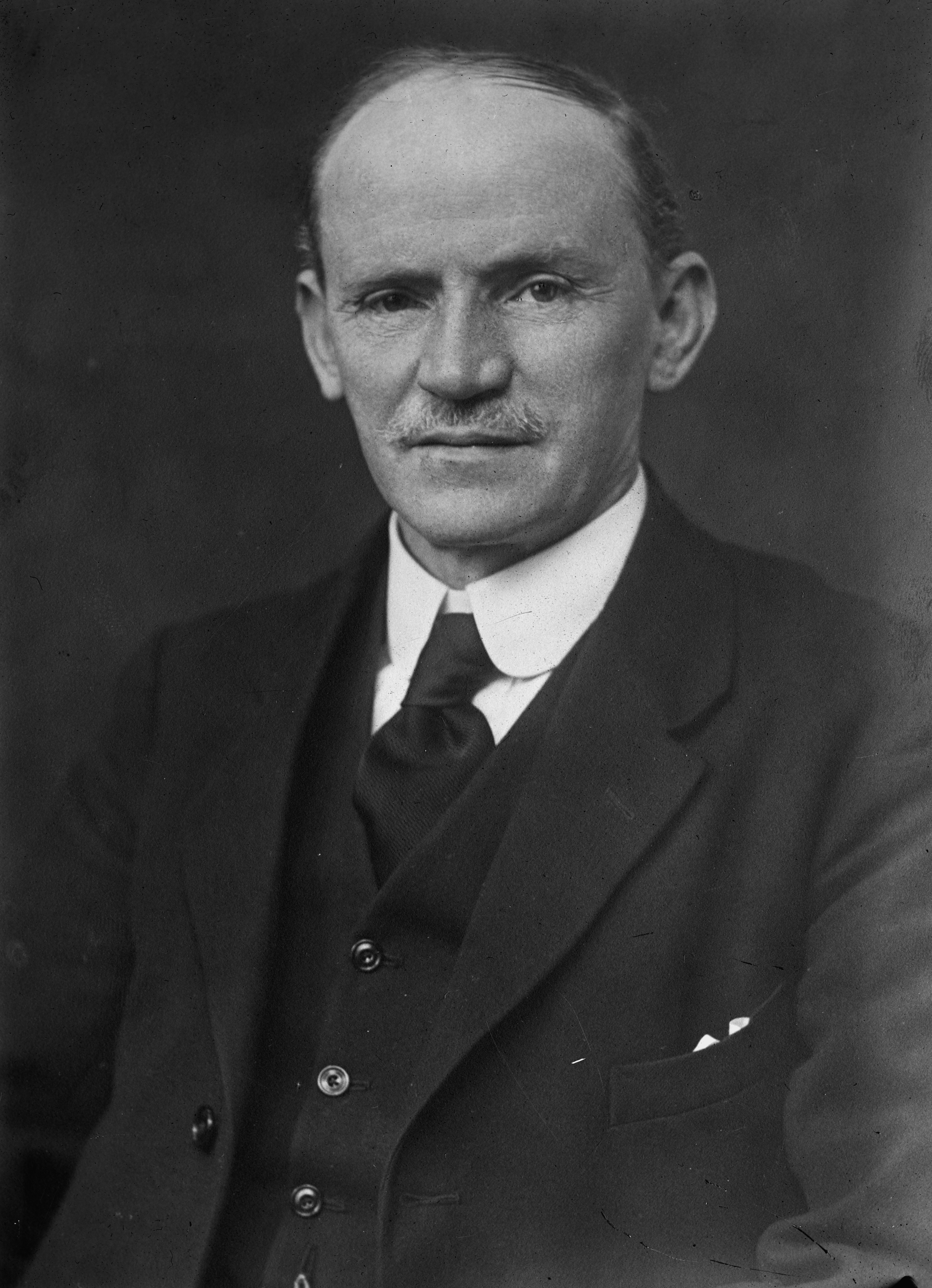
- Born: 22 March 1868; Yorkshire, England
- Died: 24 June 1940 (aged 72); Ealing, London, England
- Known for: Pickering–Fowler series
- Awards: Valz Prize (1913); Gold Medal of the Royal Astronomical Society (1915); Royal Medal (1918); Henry Draper Medal (1920); Bruce Medal (1934)
- Scientific career
- Fields: Astronomy
- Academic advisors: Norman Lockyer
- Notable students: Herbert Dingle

Alfred Fowler (22 March 1868 – 24 June 1940) was an English astronomer and spectroscopist.

== Early life and career ==
He was born in Wilsden on the outskirts of Bradford, Yorkshire and educated at London's Normal School of Science, which was later absorbed into Imperial College, London.

Fowler was appointed Instructor (later Assistant Professor) of Astrophysics at Imperial College and worked there until his death. He was an expert in spectroscopy, being one of the first to determine that the temperature of sunspots was cooler than that of surrounding regions.

He was elected a Fellow of the Royal Society in 1910, when his citation read

"Associate of the Royal College of Science. Assistant Professor of Physics (Astrophysics Department) Imperial College and Technology, South Kensington. Distinguished for his contributions to Astronomical Physics by spectroscopic observations of eclipses, solar prominences, and sunspots, and by experimental researches bearing on their interpretation. Associated in observations of total eclipses of the sun with Sir Norman Lockyer in 1893, 1896, 1898, 1900, and (with Prof Callendar) in 1905. "

He was awarded their Royal Medal in 1918 and delivered their Bakerian Lectures in 1914 and 1924.

Fowler was president of the Royal Astronomical Society from 1919 to 1921 and died in Ealing, London in 1940.

Fowler at the Fourth Conference International Union for Cooperation in Solar Research at Mount Wilson Observatory, 1910

== Pickering–Fowler series ==
In 1896, Edward Charles Pickering published observations of previously unknown lines in the spectra of the star Zeta Puppis, which he attributed to hydrogen. Fowler managed to reproduce these lines experimentally from a hydrogen-helium mixture in 1912, and agreed with Pickering's interpretation that they were previously unknown features in the spectrum of hydrogen. These lines became known as the Pickering–Fowler series and turned out to be of great significance in understanding the nature of the atom. Niels Bohr included a theoretical examination of these lines in his 'trilogy' on atomic structure and concluded that they had been wrongly attributed to hydrogen, arguing instead that they arose from ionised helium, He^{+}. Fowler was initially skeptical but was ultimately convinced that Bohr was correct, and by 1915 "spectroscopists had transferred [the Pickering–Fowler series] definitively [from hydrogen] to helium." Bohr's theoretical work on the series had demonstrated the need for "a re-examination of problems that seemed already to have been solved within classical theories" and provided important confirmation for his atomic theory.

== Honours ==
Awards

- Valz Prize from the French Academy of Sciences (1913)
- Gold Medal of the Royal Astronomical Society (1915)
- Royal Medal (1918)
- Fellow of the Royal Society
- Henry Draper Medal from the National Academy of Sciences (1920)
- Bruce Medal (1934)
- Commander of the Most Excellent Order of the British Empire (1935)

Named after him

- The crater Fowler on the Moon (jointly with Ralph H. Fowler)

== Selected papers ==
- The Spectra of Metallic Arcs in an Exhausted Globe (with H Page, (Proc Roy Soc, vol lxxii);
- Formulae for Spectrum Series (with H Shaw, Astrophys Journ, vols xviii, xxi);
- The Spectra of Antarian Stars in relation to the Fluted Spectrum of Titanium (Proc Roy Soc, vol lxxiii, 1904);
- Observations of the Spectra of Sunspots, Region C to D (Monthly Notices Roy Astron Soc, vol lxv, 1905);
- Spectroscopic Observations of the Great Sunspot (February, 1905) and Associated Prominences (ibid, vol lxv, 1905);
- Total Solar Eclipse, 1905, August 30 (with H L Callendar) (Proc Roy Soc, vol lxxvii, 1905);
- High Level Chromosperic Lines and their Behaviour in Sunspot Spectra (Monthly Notices Roy Astron Soc, vol lxvi, 1906);
- Observations and Discussion of the Spectra of Sunspots, Region B to E (Trans Internat Union Solar Research, vol i, 1906);
- Enhanced Lines of Iron in the Region F to C, and Note on Silicon in the Chromosphere (Monthly Notices, Roy Astron Soc vol lxvii, 1906);
- The Fluted Spectrum of Titanium Oxide (Proc Roy Soc, vol lxxx, 1907);
- The Origin of certain Bands in the Spectra of Sunspots (Monthly Notices, Roy Astron Soc, vol lxvii, 1907);
- Report of Committee on Sunspot Spectra (Trans Internat Union Solar Research, vol ii, 1908);
- The Spectrum of Scandium and its relation to Solar Spectra (Phil Trans, A, 1908);
- The Reproduction of Prismatic Spectrum Photographs on a Uniform Scale of Wave-lengths (Astrophys Journ, vol xxviii, 1908);
- Spectroscopic Comparison of o Ceti with Titanium Oxide (Monthly Notices, Roy Astron Soc, vol lxix, 1909).
