= Pickering series =

The Pickering series (also known as the Pickering–Fowler series) consists of three lines of singly ionised helium found, usually in absorption, in the spectra of hot stars like Wolf–Rayet stars. The name comes from Edward Charles Pickering and Alfred Fowler. The lines are produced by transitions from a higher energy level of an electron to a level with principal quantum number n = 4. The lines have wavelengths:

- 10124 Å (n = 5 to n = 4) (infrared)
- 6560 Å (n = 6 to n = 4)
- 5412 Å (n = 7 to n = 4)
- 4859 Å (n = 8 to n = 4)
- 4541 Å (n = 9 to n = 4)
- 4339 Å (n = 10 to n = 4)
- 3645.56 Å (n = ∞ to n = 4, theoretical limit, ultraviolet)

The transitions from the even-n states overlap with hydrogen lines and are therefore masked in typical absorption stellar spectra. However, they are seen in emission in the spectra of Wolf-Rayet stars, as these stars have little or no hydrogen.

In 1896, Pickering published observations of previously unknown lines in the spectra of the star Zeta Puppis. Pickering attributed the observation to a new form of hydrogen with half-integer transition levels. Fowler managed to produce similar lines from a hydrogen–helium mixture in 1912, and supported Pickering's conclusion as to their origin. Niels Bohr, however, included an analysis of the series in his 'trilogy' on atomic structure and concluded that Pickering and Fowler were wrong and that the spectral lines arise instead from singly ionised helium, He^{+}. Fowler was initially skeptical but was ultimately convinced that Bohr was correct, and by 1915 "spectroscopists had transferred [the Pickering series] definitively [from hydrogen] to helium." Bohr's theoretical work on the Pickering series had demonstrated the need for "a re-examination of problems that seemed already to have been solved within classical theories" and provided important confirmation for his atomic theory.

== Wavelength formula ==
The energy differences between levels in the Bohr model, and hence the wavelengths of emitted or absorbed photons, is given by the Rydberg formula:
$$\frac{1}{\lambda} = Z^2 R_M \left( \frac{1}{{n_1}^2} - \frac{1}{{n_2}^2} \right)$$
where

- $Z$ is the atomic number,
- $n_1$ is the principal quantum number of the lower energy level,
- $n_2$ is the principal quantum number of the upper energy level, and
- $R_M$ is the Rydberg constant for a nucleus of mass $M$. It follows $R_M=\frac{\mu}{m_e}R_\infty$ with $\mu$ the reduced mass of the nucleus and $R_\infty = \frac{m_e{q_e}^4}{64\pi^3{\varepsilon_0}^2\hbar^3c}$ is Rydberg constant.

For helium, $Z=2$, the Pickering-Fowler series is for $n_1=4$ and the reduced mass for ${}_2^4\text{He}^{+}$ is $\mu=\frac{1}{\frac{1}{m_e}+\frac{1}{2m_p+2m_n}}$ thus $\frac{\mu}{m_e}=\frac{1}{1+\frac{m_e}{2m_p+2m_n}}\approx 0.99986396$, which is usually approximated as $1$ (in fact, although this number changes for each isotope of helium, it is approximately constant). A more accurate description may be used with the Bohr–Sommerfeld model of the atom.

The theoretical limit for the wavelength in the Pickering-Fowler is given by: $\lambda_\infty^\text{PF} = \frac{4}{R_\infty}$, which is approximatedly 364.556 nm, which is the same limit as in the Balmer series (hydrogen spectral series for $n_2=2$). Notice how the transitions in the Pickering-Fowler series for n=6,8,10 (6560Å ,4859Å and 4339Å respectively) are nearly identical to the transitions in the Balmer series for n=3,4,5 (6563Å ,4861Å and 4340Å respectively). The fact that the Pickering-Fowler series has entries in between those values led scientists to believe it was due to hydrogen with half transitions ("half-hydrogen"). However, Niels Bohr used his model to show that it was due to the singly ionised helium ${}_2\text{He}^{+}$, a hydrogen-like atom. This also shows the predictability of the Bohr model.
