= 784 Pickeringia =

Large background asteroid

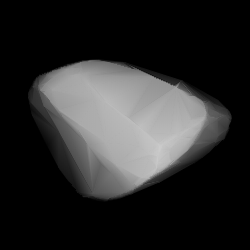
- Shape of Pickeringia from modeled lightcurve

Discovery
- Discovered by: J. H. Metcalf
- Discovery site: Winchester Obs. (799)
- Discovery date: 20 March 1914

Designations
- Named after: Edward Charles Pickering; William Henry Pickering; (American astronomers)
- Alternative designations: A914 FC · 1914 UM
- Minor planet category: main-belt · (outer); background

Orbital characteristics
- Epoch 31 May 2020 (JD 2459000.5)
- Uncertainty parameter 0
- Observation arc: 105.82 yr (38,652 d)
- Aphelion: 3.8458 AU
- Perihelion: 2.3455 AU
- Semi-major axis: 3.0956 AU
- Eccentricity: 0.2423
- Orbital period (sidereal): 5.45 yr (1,989 d)
- Mean anomaly: 97.354°
- Mean motion: 0° 10^{m} 51.6^{s} / day
- Inclination: 12.284°
- Longitude of ascending node: 14.917°
- Argument of perihelion: 238.01°

Physical characteristics
- Mean diameter: 82.52±7.18 km (composite estimate) Individual estimates: 74.89±0.92 km; 75.596±0.311 km; 89.42±3.4 km
- Mass: (1.0±1.0)×10^{18} kg (Note: Calculated from its standard gravitational parameter GM = 0.07±0.07 km^{3}/s^{2}.) (SB441)
- Mean density: 2.8–4.8 g/cm^{3} (calculated)
- Synodic rotation period: 13.144±0.005 h
- Pole ecliptic latitude: (103°, 68.0°) (λ_{1}/β_{1}) (Note: DAMIT-Online: Poles for (784) Pickeringia, with (103°, 68.0°) (λ_{1}/β_{1}) and (282°, 35.0°) (λ_{2}/β_{2}) in ecliptic coordinates. Summary figures and shape models at the Database of Asteroid Models from Inversion Techniques (DAMIT).); (282°, 35.0°) (λ_{2}/β_{2})
- Geometric albedo: 0.0555±0.005; 0.080±0.002; 0.086±0.014
- Spectral type: SMASS = C; V–R = 0.416±0.023
- Absolute magnitude (H): 9.00; 9.3

784 Pickeringia (prov. designation: A914 FC or 1914 UM) is a large background asteroid, approximately 76 kilometers (47 miles) in diameter, located in the outer region of the asteroid belt. It was discovered on 20 March 1914, by American astronomer Joel Hastings Metcalf at the Winchester Observatory (799) in Massachusetts. The dark C-type asteroid has a rotation period of 13.1 hours and an irregular shape. It was named after American astronomers Edward Charles Pickering (1846–1919) and his brother William Henry Pickering (1858–1938).

== Orbit and classification ==
Pickeringia is a non-family asteroid of the main belt's background population when applying the hierarchical clustering method to its proper orbital elements. It orbits the Sun in the outer asteroid belt at a distance of 2.3–3.8 AU once every 5 years and 5 months (1,989 days; semi-major axis of 3.1 AU). Its orbit has an eccentricity of 0.24 and an inclination of 12° with respect to the ecliptic. The body's observation arc begins at Heidelberg Observatory on 30 September 1921, more than seven years after its official discovery observation at Winchester Observatory (799).

== Naming ==
This minor planet was named after American astronomers Edward Charles Pickering (1846–1919) and his brother William Henry Pickering (1858–1938), who were the directors of the Harvard Observatory and the Boyden Station at Arequipa, respectively. William Henry also discovered Phoebe, an irregular moon of Saturn. The naming was mentioned in The Names of the Minor Planets by Paul Herget in 1955 (H 78). The lunar crater Pickering and the Martian crater Pickering were also named in honor of the two astronomers.

== Physical characteristics ==
In the Bus–Binzel SMASS classification, Pickeringia is a common, carbonaceous C-type asteroid.

=== Rotation period ===
In January 2017, a rotational lightcurve of Pickeringia was obtained from photometric observations by the Spanish group of asteroids observers (OBAS). Lightcurve analysis gave a rotation period of 13.144±0.005 hours with a brightness variation of 0.17±0.03 magnitude (U=2+).

The result supersedes observations taken during the 1990s by European astronomers using the ESO 0.5-metre telescope at La Silla Observatory, Chile, which gave a period of 13 hours with an amplitude of 0.40 magnitude (U=2). as well as a period determination by French amateur astronomer Laurent Bernasconi in December 2004, which gave 13.17±0.05 h and an amplitude of 0.20±0.01 magnitude (U=2).

=== Modeled lightcurve ===
Two modeled lightcurves, published by Josef Ďurech and Josef Hanuš in 2016, using photometric data from the Lowell Photometric Database (LPD) and other sources, gave a sidereal period of 13.16995±0.00001 and 13.16998±0.00005, respectively. Each modeled lightcurve also determined two spin axes of (99.0°, 67.0°) and (283.0°, 30.0°), as well as (282.0°, 35.0°) and (103.0°, 68.0°) in ecliptic coordinates (λ, β), respectively. The online version of the Database of Asteroid Models from Inversion Techniques gives two poles at (103°, 68.0°) and (282°, 35.0°) with a nearly identical sidereal period.

=== Diameter and albedo ===
According to the surveys carried out by the Japanese Akari satellite, the NEOWISE mission of NASA's Wide-field Infrared Survey Explorer (WISE), and the Infrared Astronomical Satellite IRAS, Pickeringia measures (74.89±0.92), (75.596±0.311) and (89.42±3.4) kilometers in diameter and its surface has an albedo of (0.080±0.002), (0.086±0.014) and (0.0555±0.005), respectively. The Collaborative Asteroid Lightcurve Link derives an albedo of 0.0423 and a diameter of 89.19 kilometers based on an absolute magnitude of 9.3. while Carry gives a diameter of 82.52±7.18 km and estimates a mass of (3.74±0.32)×10^{18} kilogram from an unrealistic density of 12.70±3.49 g/cm^{3}. Alternative mean-diameter measurements published by the WISE team include (70.14±18.05 km), (89.13±13.47 km) and (89.673±1.178 km) with corresponding albedos of (0.049±0.348), (0.0552±0.0109) and (0.06±0.02). On 7 August 2008, an asteroid occultation of Pickeringia gave a best-fit ellipse dimension of (89.0 km × 89.0 km), with a poor quality rating of 1. These timed observations are taken when the asteroid passes in front of a distant star.
