= Edward Charles Pickering =

American astronomer

Edward Charles Pickering ForMemRS HFRSE
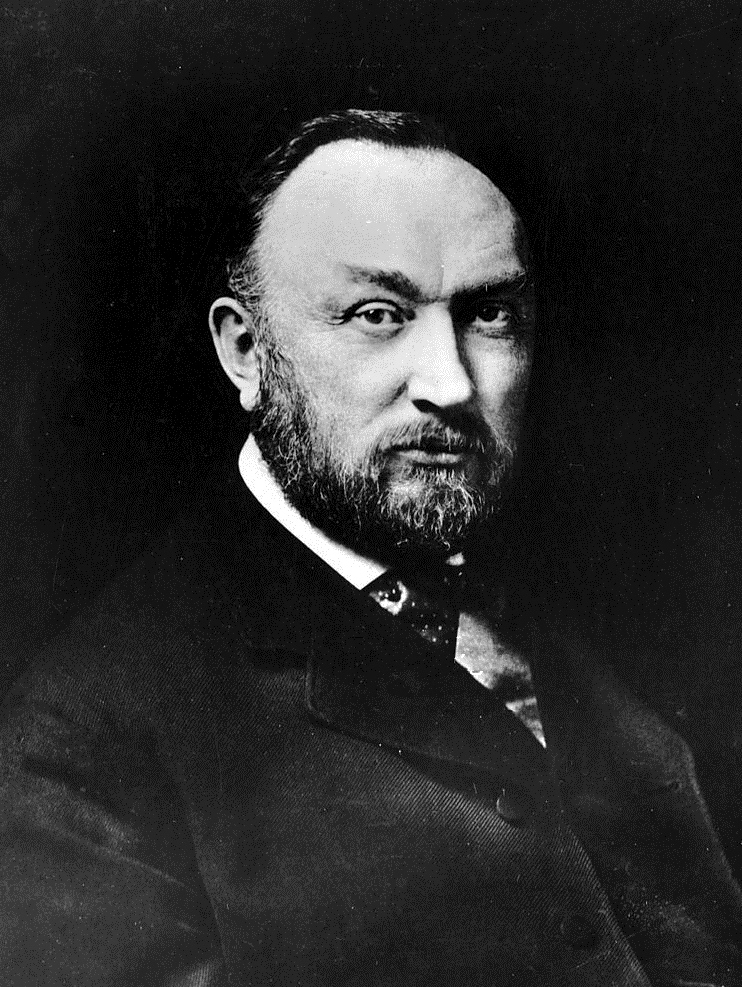
- Pickering in the 1880s
- Born: July 19, 1846; Boston, Massachusetts, U.S.
- Died: February 3, 1919 (aged 72); Cambridge, Massachusetts, U.S.
- Resting place: Mount Auburn Cemetery, Cambridge, Massachusetts, U.S.
- Education: Harvard University
- Known for: Spectroscopic binary stars Pickering–Fowler series
- Relatives: William Henry Pickering (brother)
- Awards: Member of the National Academy of Sciences (1873); Henry Draper Medal (1888); Valz Prize (1888); Bruce Medal (1908); Gold Medal of the Royal Astronomical Society (1886 and 1901)
- Scientific career
- Fields: Astronomy

Edward Charles Pickering (July 19, 1846 – February 3, 1919) was an American astronomer and physicist and the older brother of William Henry Pickering. Along with Carl Vogel, Pickering discovered the first spectroscopic binary stars. He wrote Elements of Physical Manipulations (2 vol., 1873–76).

== Personal life ==
Pickering was born at 43 Bowdoin Street in Boston, Massachusetts, on July 19, 1846, to Edward Pickering and Charlotte Hammond. His brother, William Henry Pickering, was a graduate of the Massachusetts Institute of Technology (MIT) and professor of physics and astronomy.

Pickering was interested in the stars as a boy, and constructed his own telescope by the age of 12. He enjoyed his work at the observatory, but he also enjoyed mountain climbing and bicycling in earlier days and later he was an interested spectator of football games. He was co-founder and first president of the Appalachian Mountain Club. He was also a lover of classic music. During the First World War, he was busy trying to devise useful applications to win the war. The Pickering Polaris Attachment was a device used to determine the range of guns. In 1874, Pickering married Lizzie Wadsworth Sparks, whose father was formerly the president of Harvard. Pickering spent his final thirteen years a widower atter Lizzie's death in 1906.

== Education ==
Pickering was educated at Boston Latin School, and then studied at the Lawrence Scientific School at Harvard, where he received his bachelor of science (BS) degree in 1865.

== Career and research ==
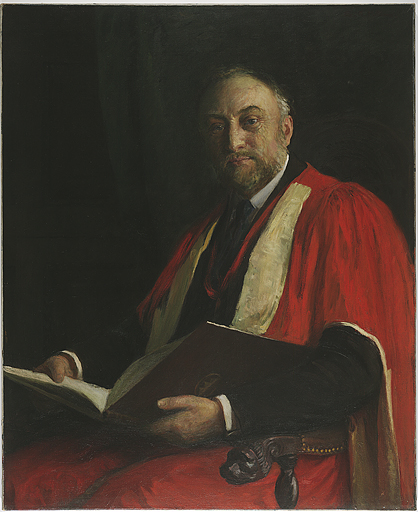
This portrait was painted in 1911 by Sarah Gooll Putnam and is now part of the Harvard Art Museum.

Immediately upon graduating from Harvard he was hired as an instructor of mathematics there, and a year later he moved to MIT to be an assistant professor of physics. In 1868, he was made Thayer Professor of Physics, succeeding William Barton Rogers. During the decade he was there, Pickering created the first physics lab in America which was designed for students to publish their own findings and research. Pickering named this lab the Rogers Laboratory of Physics and pronounced himself Director of the Laboratory. He resigned as Thayer Professor of Physics in 1877, and was succeeded by Charles R. Cross. Pickering served as director of Harvard College Observatory (HCO), from 1877 to his death in 1919, where he made great leaps forward in the gathering of stellar spectra through the use of photography.

Pickering at the Fourth Conference International Union for Cooperation in Solar Research at Mount Wilson Observatory, 1910

Shortly after the death of college doctor and amateur astronomer Henry Draper, an opportunity presented itself for Pickering. Draper's death left the incompletion of his work studying astronomy using photography. Draper had no children to carry on and finish his legacy, so his wife, Mary Anna Draper, planned on finishing his work. Pickering wrote a letter to Mrs. Draper "...pray recollect that if I can in any way advise or aid you, I shall be doing but little to repay Dr. Draper for a friendship which I shall always value, but which can never be replaced." Mrs. Draper urgently responded and soon dropped off her husband's work to Pickering. Pickering concluded that Draper's use of photography in astronomy was very promising compared to the traditional method of observation and recording using one's eye through instruments. In 1884, a paper on such observations was published with the author "the late Henry Draper". After receiving criticism from Dr. William Huggins, a friend of Dr. Draper, Pickering began to hire more assistants to strengthen Draper's findings. This consequently also strengthened and contributed to Harvard Computers.

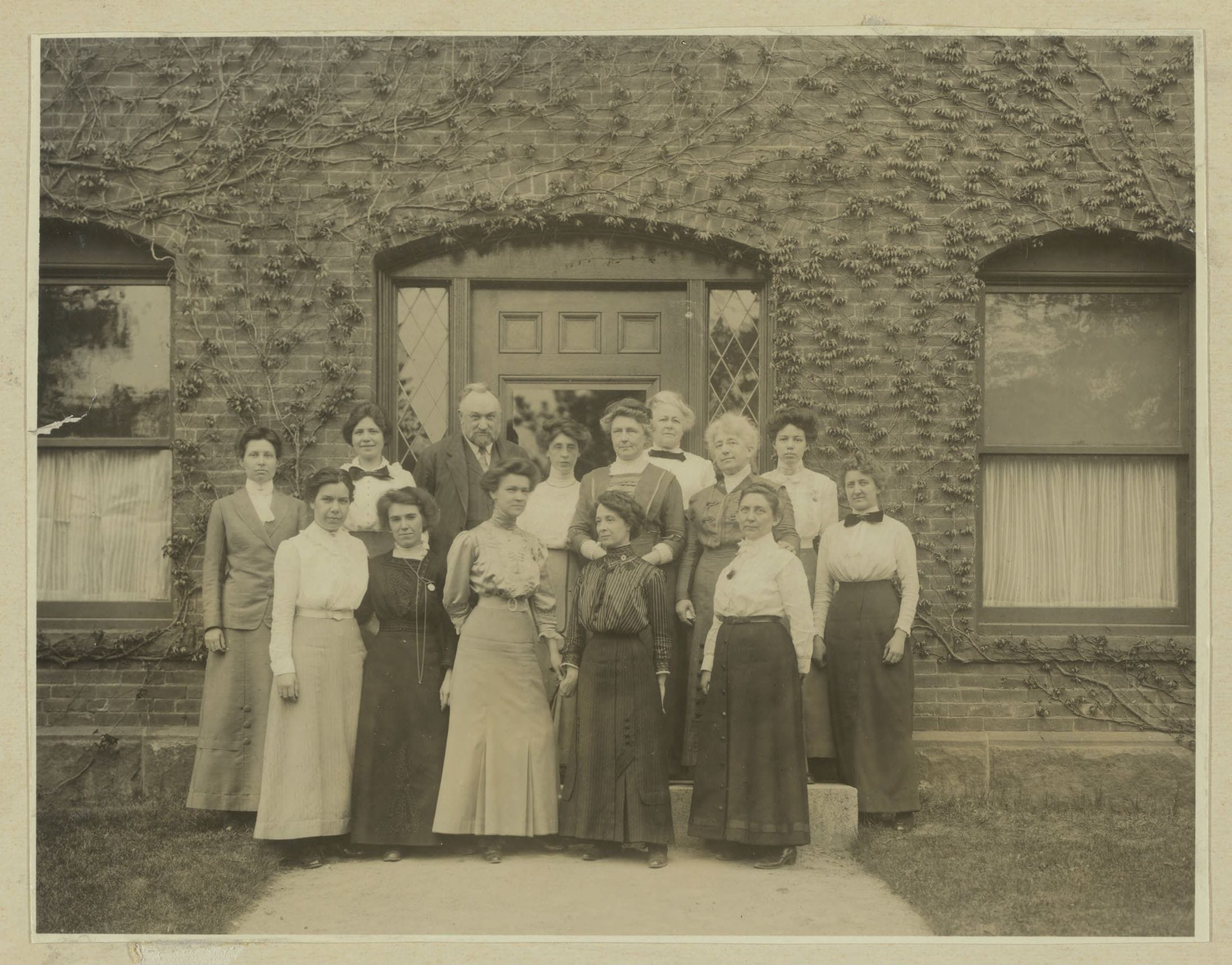
Pickering and the Harvard Computers, standing in front of Building C at the Harvard College Observatory, 13 May 1913

In 1882, he started his appeals for international variable star observations. This was met with opposition, but eventually such a cooperation was realized in the Variable Star Section of the British Astronomical Association and the American Association of Variable Star Observers (AAVSO). Pickering had a good relationship with the AAVSO and received a gold paper knife with precious stones.

In 1882, Pickering developed a method to photograph the spectra of multiple stars simultaneously by putting a large prism in front of the photographic plate. Using this method, Pickering and his team captured images of over 220,000 stars. Over the following decades, this technique was used to produce a catalog recording every visible star's movements. At the time of his death, the total weight of the photographic plates produced by his research was reported in his obituary as exceeding 120 tons.

He also, along with Williamina Fleming and Annie Jump Cannon, designed a stellar classification system based on an alphabetic system for spectral classes that was first known as the Harvard Stellar Classification and became the basis for the Henry Draper Catalog.

In 1896, Pickering published observations of previously unknown lines in the spectra of the star ζ-Puppis. These lines became known as the Pickering series (or the Pickering–Fowler series) and Pickering attributed them to hydrogen in 1897. Alfred Fowler gave the same attribution to similar lines that he observed in a hydrogen-helium mixture in 1912. Analysis by Niels Bohr included in his 'trilogy' on atomic structure argued that the spectral lines arose from ionized helium, He^{+}, and not from hydrogen. Fowler was initially-skeptical but was ultimately convinced that Bohr was correct, and by 1915 "spectroscopists had transferred [the Pickering series] definitively [from hydrogen] to helium." Bohr's theoretical work on the Pickering series had demonstrated the need for "a re-examination of problems that seemed already to have been solved within classical theories" and provided important confirmation for his atomic theory.

Pickering is credited with making the Harvard College Observatory known around the world. It is still considered today to be a well-known observatory and program.

=== Harvard Computers ===
The Harvard College Observatory was becoming a premiere observatory in the world and with it came the demand for more assistants. These assistants were critical for taking notes, running calculations and performing analytics. College educated women from around the country offered to work for the Harvard Observatory unpaid to gain experience or until proving their value to be paid. During this time, Pickering recruited over 80 women to work for him, including Annie Jump Cannon, Henrietta Swan Leavitt, Antonia Maury, and Florence Cushman. It was very unusual for such an accomplished scientist to work with this many women, but it has been said that he "became so exasperated with his male assistant's inefficiency, that even his maid could do a better job of copying and computing". These women, the Harvard Computers (also described as "Pickering's Harem" by the male scientific community at the time), made several important discoveries at HCO. Leavitt's discovery of the period-luminosity relationship for Cepheids, published by Pickering, would prove the foundation for the modern understanding of cosmological distances.

Pickering's treatment of women, during his time, was considered better than most. It is true that they were underpaid compared to their male counterparts and were not given credit nearly as often, but his willingness to include them in the world of astronomy paved the way for many great female scientists and leaders. This added to the observatory's funding through fellowships and the procurement of women including alumnus and professors aiding in the creation of Harvard Computers.

== Death and legacy ==
Pickering was the fourth and longest-serving director of HCO, having filled the role for 42 years. On February 3, 1919, Pickering unexpectedly died at age 72, from pneumonia and heart complications after being ill for around ten days. He died while holding the position of director of the University Observatory, continuing an odd 42-year tradition of HCO directors dying in office. He is interred in Mount Auburn Cemetery. After his death, Solon Bailey served as interim director. Pickering's friends and colleges remembered him for his great ability, originality, initiative, and warm-heartedness. Pickering would be remembered by the world for his contribution to astronomical photography, advancement of astronomical discoveries, and his progressive view of women.

Although today his treatment of women is associated with a negative connotation, he was known during the time to give women more equal treatment than most. Doing so paved the way for many more women to become interested and involved in astronomy. Pickering's work with glass plates to photograph the sky was the start of major technological advances for astronomical photography. Although glass plates are no longer used, his work led to modern uses of charged coupled devices in the 1970s.

== Honors and awards ==
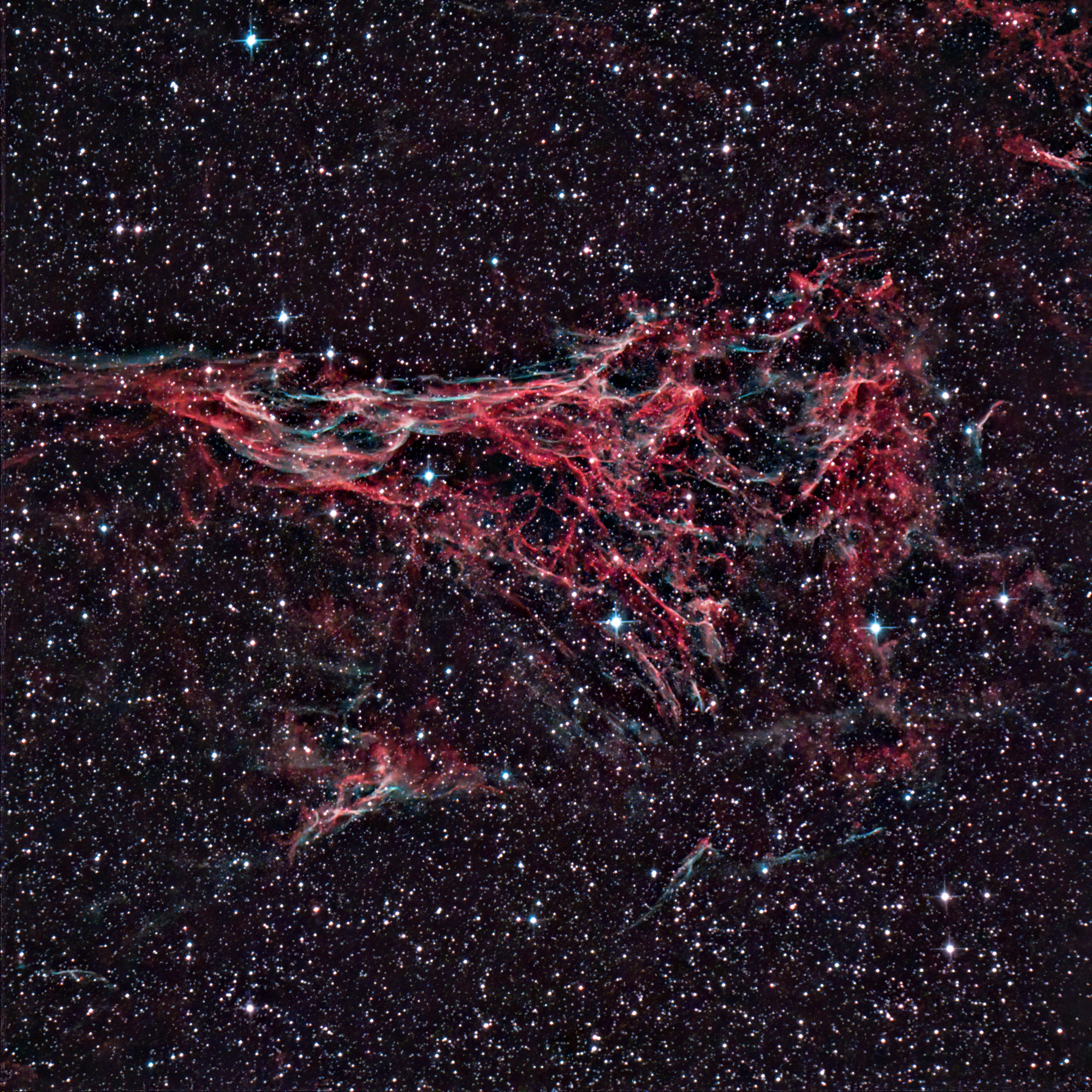
Pickering's Triangle. The filaments are also known as Williamina Fleming's Triangular Wisp

His awards and honors include:

- Pickering was the youngest person to be elected a Member of the National Academy of Sciences in 1873 when he was 26 years old.
- Fellow of the American Academy of Arts and Sciences (1867)
- Gold Medal of the Royal Astronomical Society (1886 and 1901)
- Valz Prize of the French Academy of Sciences (1888)
- Henry Draper Medal from the National Academy of Sciences (1888)
- Member of the American Philosophical Society (1896)
- Bruce Medal (1908)
- Prix Jules Janssen, the highest award of the Société astronomique de France, the French astronomical society (1908)
- LL. D. (honorary degree) at six American universities and two doctor degrees at foreign universities
- Rumford Medal
- Pour le Merite

The following are named in his honor:

- The crater, Pickering lunar crater
- The crater, Pickering martian crater
- Asteroid 784 Pickeringia
- Part of the Veil Nebula, Pickering's Triangle
- Mount Pickering, a mountain in California

=== Publications ===
- (1873–76) Elements of physical manipulation New York: Hurd & Houghton OCLC 16078533
- (1882) A plan for securing observations of the variable stars Cambridge: J. Wilson and Son OCLC 260332440
- (1886) An investigation in stellar photography Cambridge: J. Wilson and Son OCLC 15790725
- (1891) Preparation and discussion of the Draper catalogue Cambridge: J. Wilson and Son OCLC 3492105
- (1903) Plan for the endowment of astronomical research Cambridge: Astronomical observatory of Harvard College OCLC 30005226
- Pickering, EC (1912). "The Allegheny Observatory In Its Relation To Astronomy". Science. Vol. 36, no. 927 (published October 4, 1912). pp. 417–421. Bibcode:1912Sci....36..417P. doi:10.1126/science.36.927.417. PMID 17788756.
