= RRL =

RRL may refer to:

- Regional Rail Link a new regional railway line in Victoria, Australia
- Regional Red List
- Rich Representation Language a computer language used for multi-agent animation
- Russian Rugby League Federation
- Regional Research Laborotaries, under the Council of Scientific and Industrial Research (CSIR), in India
- Road Research Laboratory, former name of the Transport Research Laboratory in the UK
- Rocket Racing League
- Radio relay link
- Radio Recombination Lines
- An acronym for Recommended Reading List
