= Hyginus (crater) =

Volcanic formation on the Moon

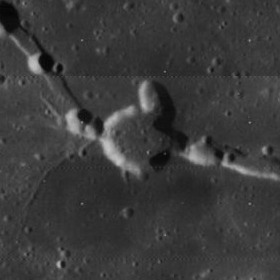
- Lunar Orbiter 4 image
- Coordinates: 7.8°N 6.3°E
- Diameter: 11 km
- Depth: 0.8 km
- Colongitude: 354° at sunrise
- Eponym: C. Julius Hyginus

Hyginus is a lunar caldera located at the east end of the Sinus Medii. It was named after ancient Roman astronomer Gaius Julius Hyginus. Its rim is split by a 220 kilometer-long rille, Rima Hyginus, that branches to the northwest and to the east-southeast. The crater is deeper than the rille, and lies at intersection of the rille's branches. Together, the crater and the rille form a prominent feature in an otherwise flat surface. Smaller craters along the length of the rille may have been caused by the collapse of an underlying structure.

== Geology ==
Hyginus is one of the few craters on the Moon that were not created as a result of an impact, and is instead believed to be volcanic in origin. It lacks the raised outer rim that is typical with impact craters.

== Exploration ==
Hyginus was considered a possible landing site during the Apollo Program, because it was thought to be a site of potentially active volcanism. The landing point would have been northwest of the crater, within a few kilometers of the main crater rim and the rille to the west. Major objectives would have included examining and sampling the Cayley Formation and dark overlying rocks, the crater rim and floor, and other possible volcanic features in the area.

== Appearance ==
It was near Hyginus that in 1878 Hermann Klein claimed to have discovered a new crater.

Immediately south of the eastern end of the chevron shaped Rima Hyginus, a dark spot is noticeable during full moon. This dark spot received the officially recognized identification Hyginus S. It is also seen on the photographic version of chart LAC 59 (page 118) in The Clementine Atlas of the Moon (Ben Bussey / Paul D. Spudis).

== Views ==
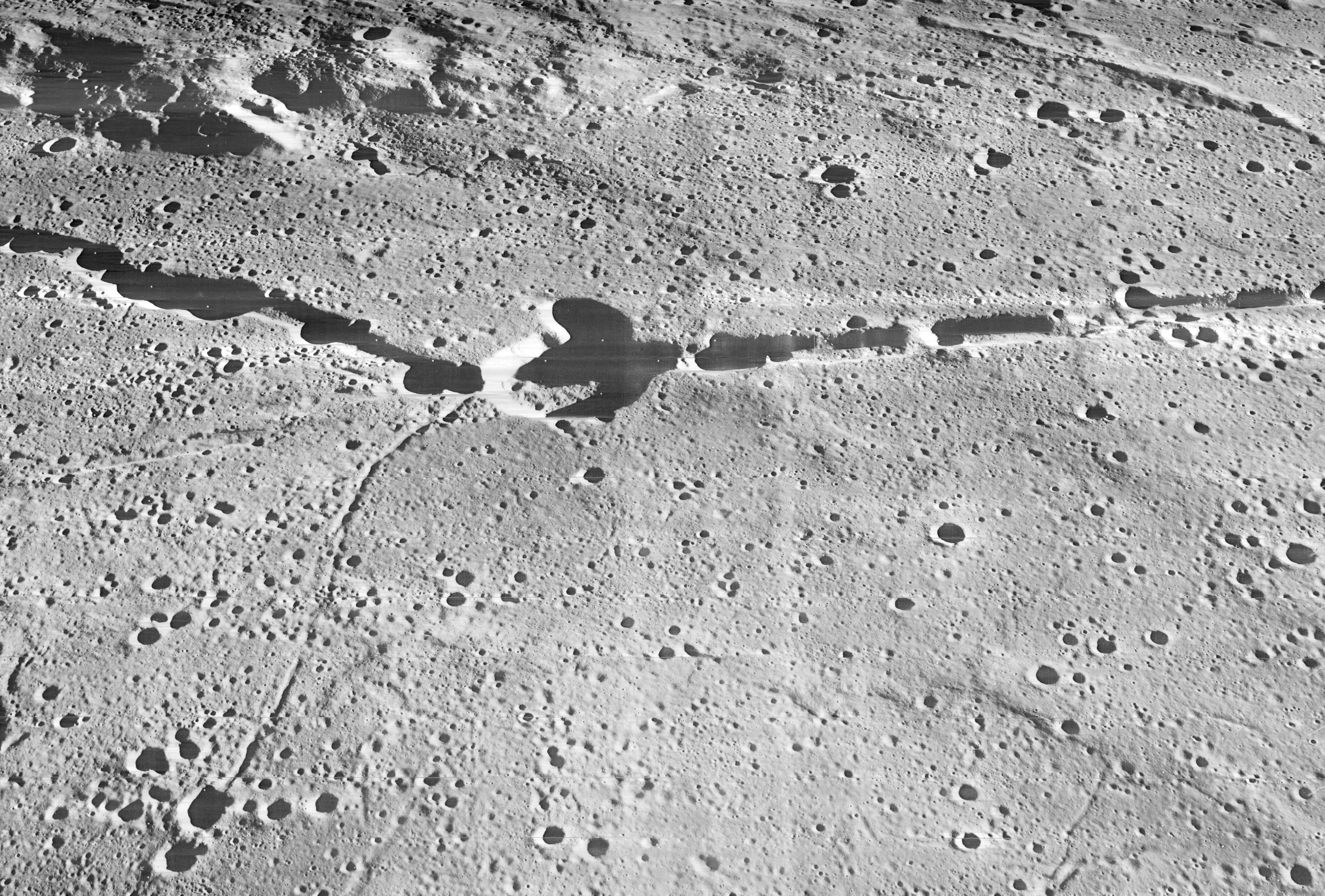
Lunar Orbiter 3 image

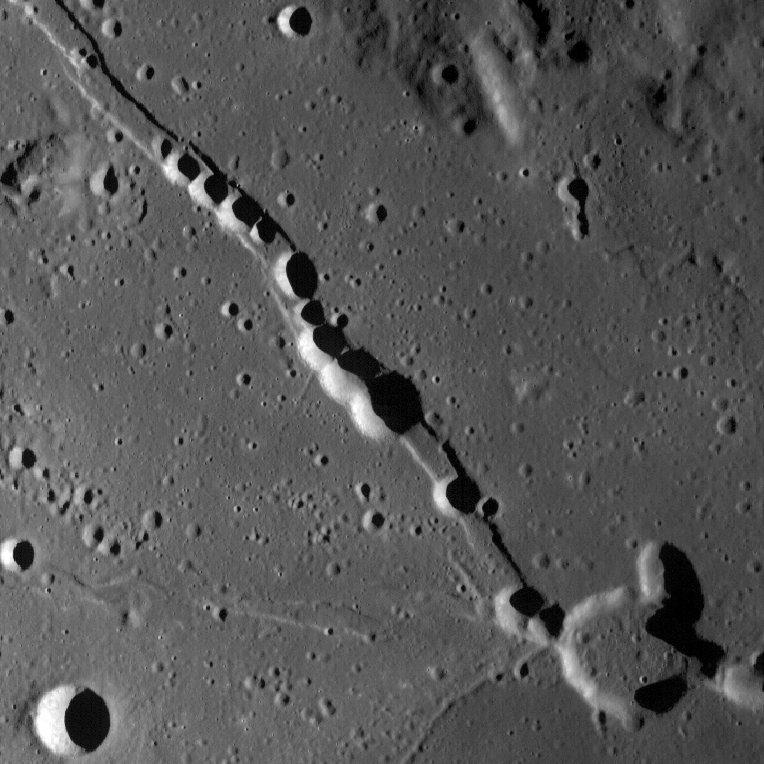
LRO image of Hyginus (lower right) and part of Rima Hyginus

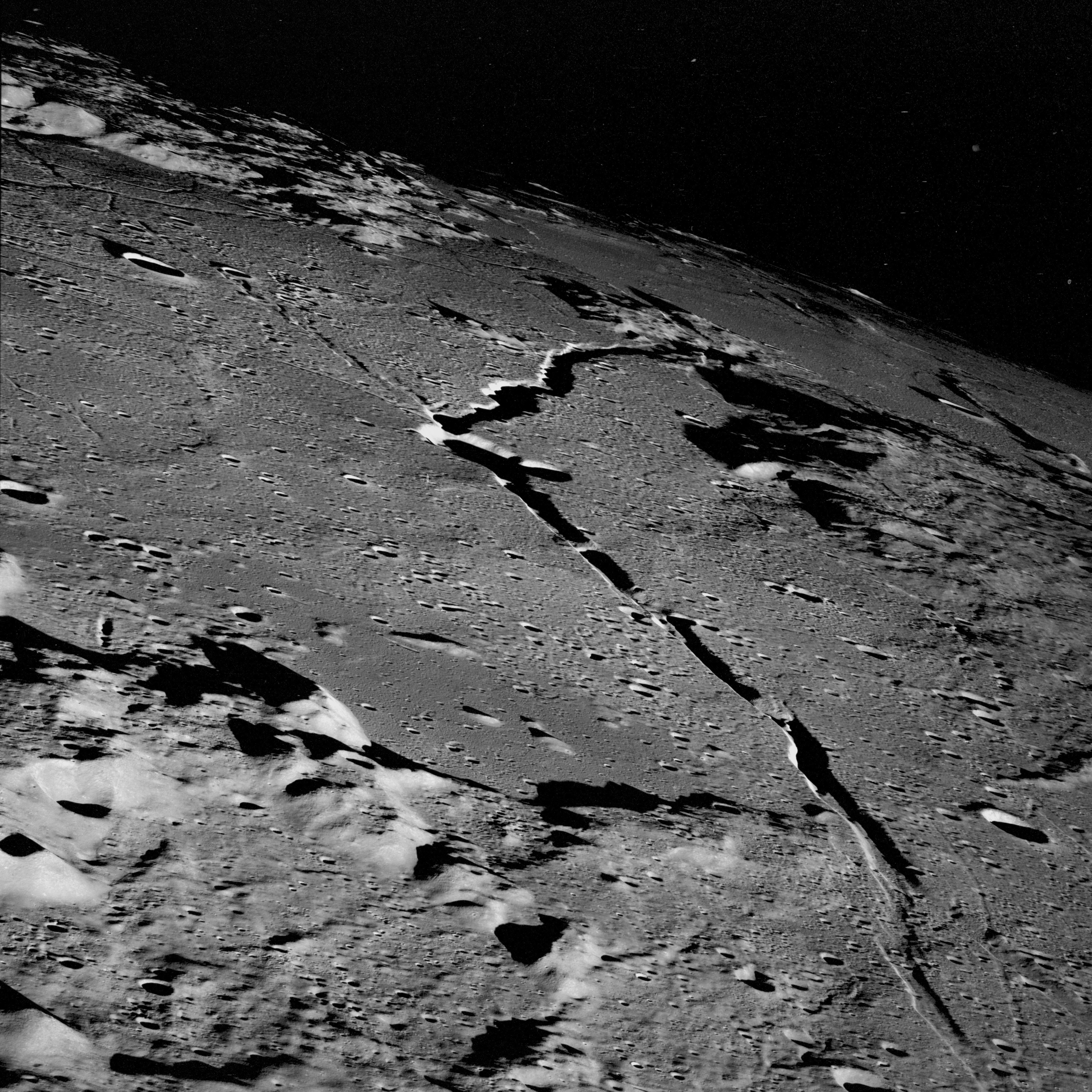
Oblique view from Apollo 10

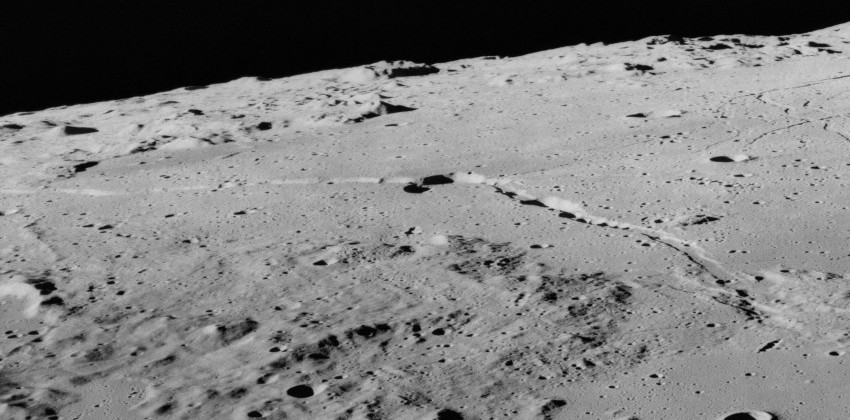
Oblique view from Apollo 17

== Satellite craters ==
By convention these features are identified on lunar maps by placing the letter on the side of the crater midpoint that is closest to Hyginus.

Hyginus	Latitude	Longitude	Diameter
A	6.3° N	5.7° E	8 km
B	7.6° N	5.1° E	6 km
C	7.7° N	8.3° E	5 km
D	11.4° N	4.3° E	5 km
E	8.7° N	8.5° E	4 km
F	8.0° N	8.6° E	4 km
G	11.0° N	6.0° E	4 km
H	6.0° N	7.0° E	4 km
N	10.5° N	7.4° E	11 km
S	6.4° N	8.0° E	29 km
W	9.7° N	7.7° E	22 km
Z	8.0° N	9.5° E	28 km
