= Albategnius (crater) =

Crater on the Moon

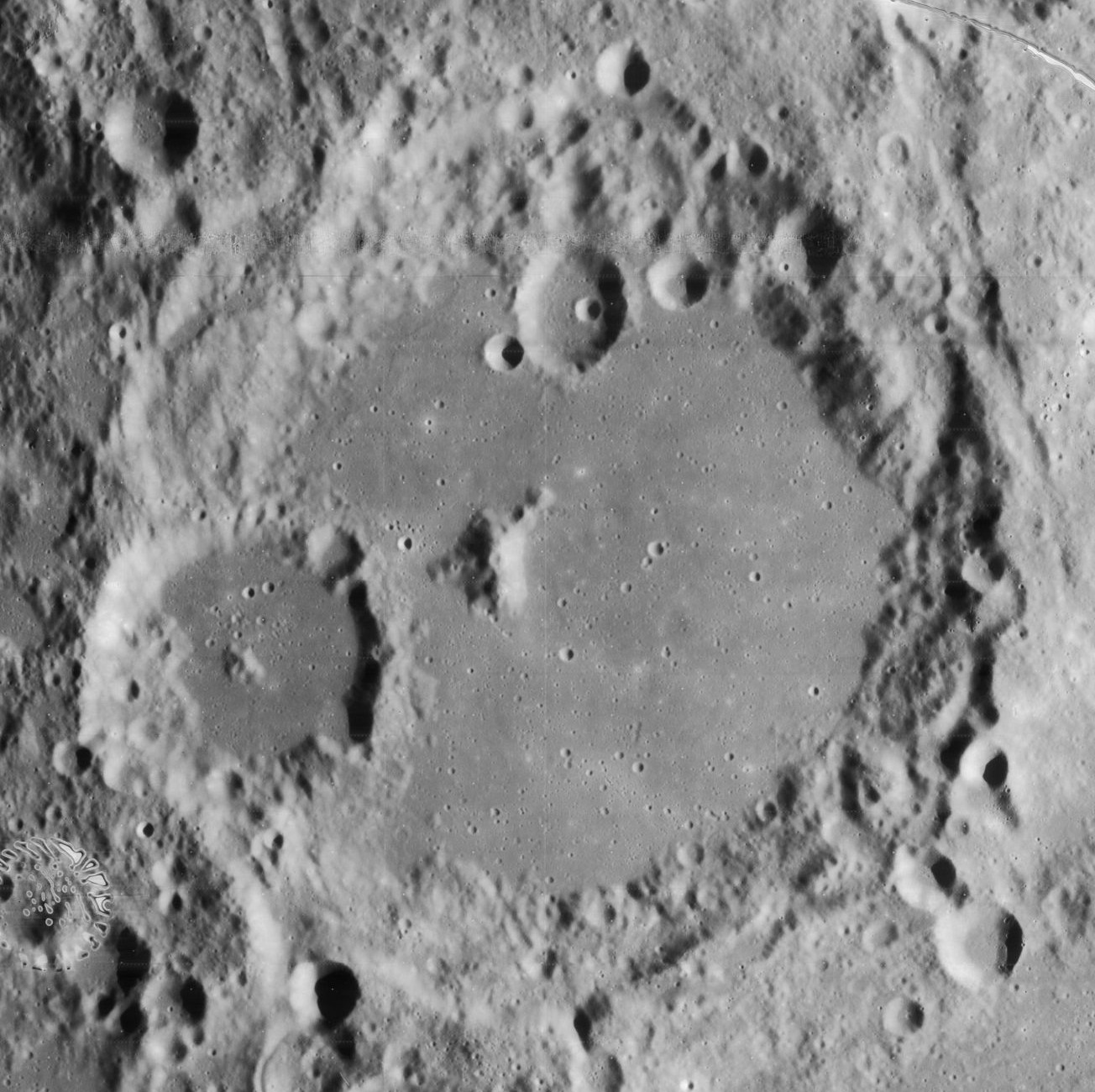
- Lunar Orbiter 4 image
- Coordinates: 11.2°S 4.1°E
- Diameter: 130.84 km
- Depth: 3.2 km
- Colongitude: 356° at sunrise
- Formation: Nectarian
- Eponym: Al-Batani

Albategnius is an ancient lunar impact crater located in the central lunar highlands. It is south of the crater Hipparchus and to the east of both Ptolemaeus and Alphonsus. The surface in this area is marked by a set of nearly parallel scars that form channels running roughly in a north–south line, bent slightly to the southeast.

== Description ==
Albategnius is one of the largest craters of Nectarian age. The level interior of Albategnius forms a walled plain, surrounded by the high, terraced rim. The outer wall is somewhat hexagon-shaped, and has been heavily eroded with impacts, valleys, and landslips. It attains a height above 4,000 metres along the northeast face. There is a crater chain along the northwest wall. The rim is broken in the southwest by the smaller crater Klein.

Offset to the west of the crater's midpoint is its central peak, designated Alpha (α) Albategnius. It is longest in extent in the north–south direction, extending for just under 20 kilometres, and has a width about half that. The peak rises to an altitude of roughly 1.5 km, and a tiny, relatively fresh crater is at the top. The peak is only a fraction of the size observed of central peaks in comparable younger craters. This suggests the rise has been modified since it originally formed.

== Nomenclature ==
This crater is named after Mesopotamian Muslim astronomer and scientist Abū ʿAbd Allāh Muḥammad ibn Jābir ibn Sinān al-Raqqī al-Ḥarrānī aṣ-Ṣābiʾ al-Battānī (before 858 – 929), Latinized as Albategnius. Its designation was formally adopted by the International Astronomical Union in 1935.

Like many of the craters on the Moon's near side, this crater was given its name by Giovanni Riccioli, whose 1651 nomenclature system has become standardized. Earlier lunar cartographers had given the feature different names. Michael van Langren's 1645 map calls it "Ferdinandi III Imp. Rom." after Ferdinand III, the Holy Roman Emperor. Johannes Hevelius called it "Didymus Mons".

Albategnius is believed to have been featured prominently in an early sketch drawing by Galileo in his book Sidereus Nuncius (1610), appearing along the lunar terminator.

== Satellite craters ==
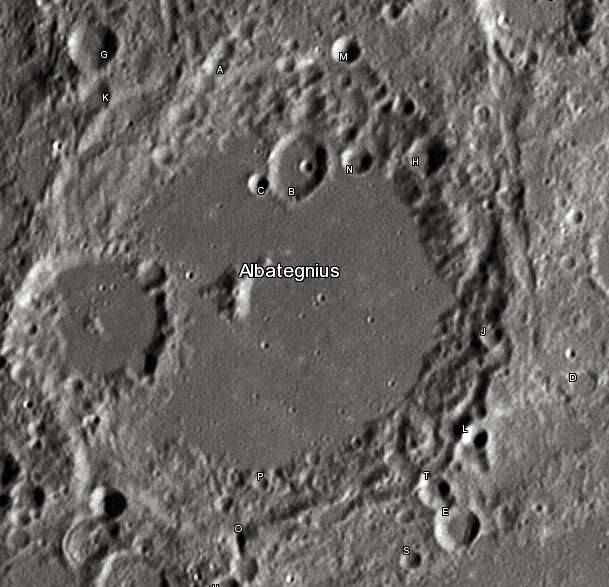
Albategnius crater and its satellite craters taken from Earth at the University of Hertfordshire's Bayfordbury Observatory with the telescopes Meade LX200 14" and Lumenera Skynyx 2-1 (2012).

By convention these features are identified on lunar maps by placing the letter on the side of the crater midpoint that is closest to Albategnius.

Albategnius	Latitude	Longitude	Diameter
A	8.9° S	3.2° E	7 km
B	10.0° S	4.0° E	20 km
C	10.3° S	3.7° E	6 km
D	11.3° S	7.1° E	9 km
E	12.9° S	6.4° E	14 km
G	9.4° S	1.9° E	15 km
H	9.7° S	5.2° E	11 km
J	11.1° S	6.2° E	7 km
K	9.9° S	2.0° E	10 km
L	12.1° S	6.3° E	8 km
M	8.9° S	4.2° E	9 km
N	9.8° S	4.5° E	9 km
O	13.2° S	4.2° E	5 km
P	12.9° S	4.5° E	5 km
S	13.3° S	6.1° E	6 km
T	12.6° S	6.1° E	9 km

Albategnius B lies in the northern floor of the main crater.

== Gallery ==
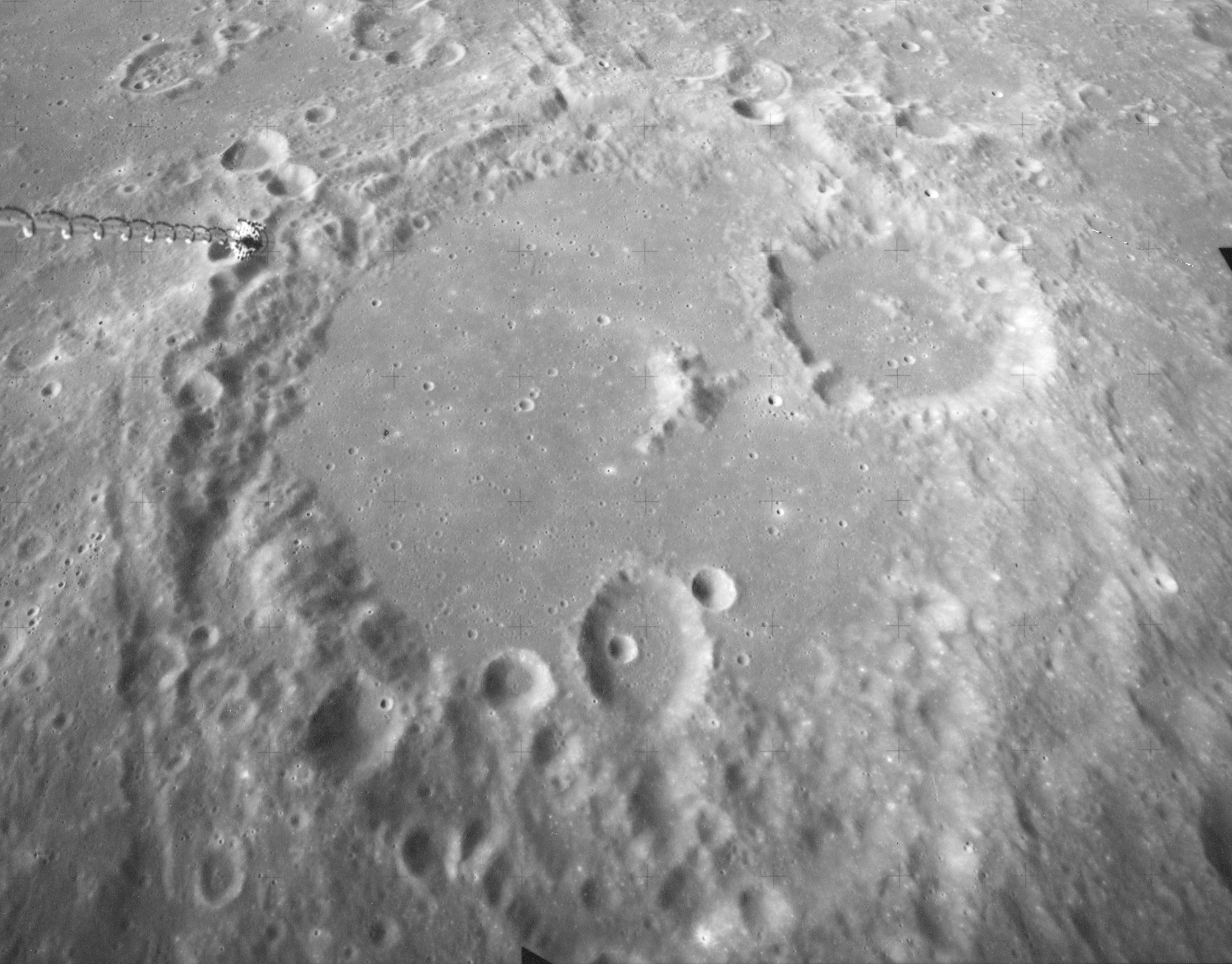
Oblique view from Apollo 16, facing south, with Klein in upper right.

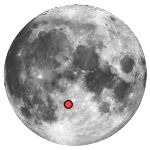
Location of Albategnius on the Moon.

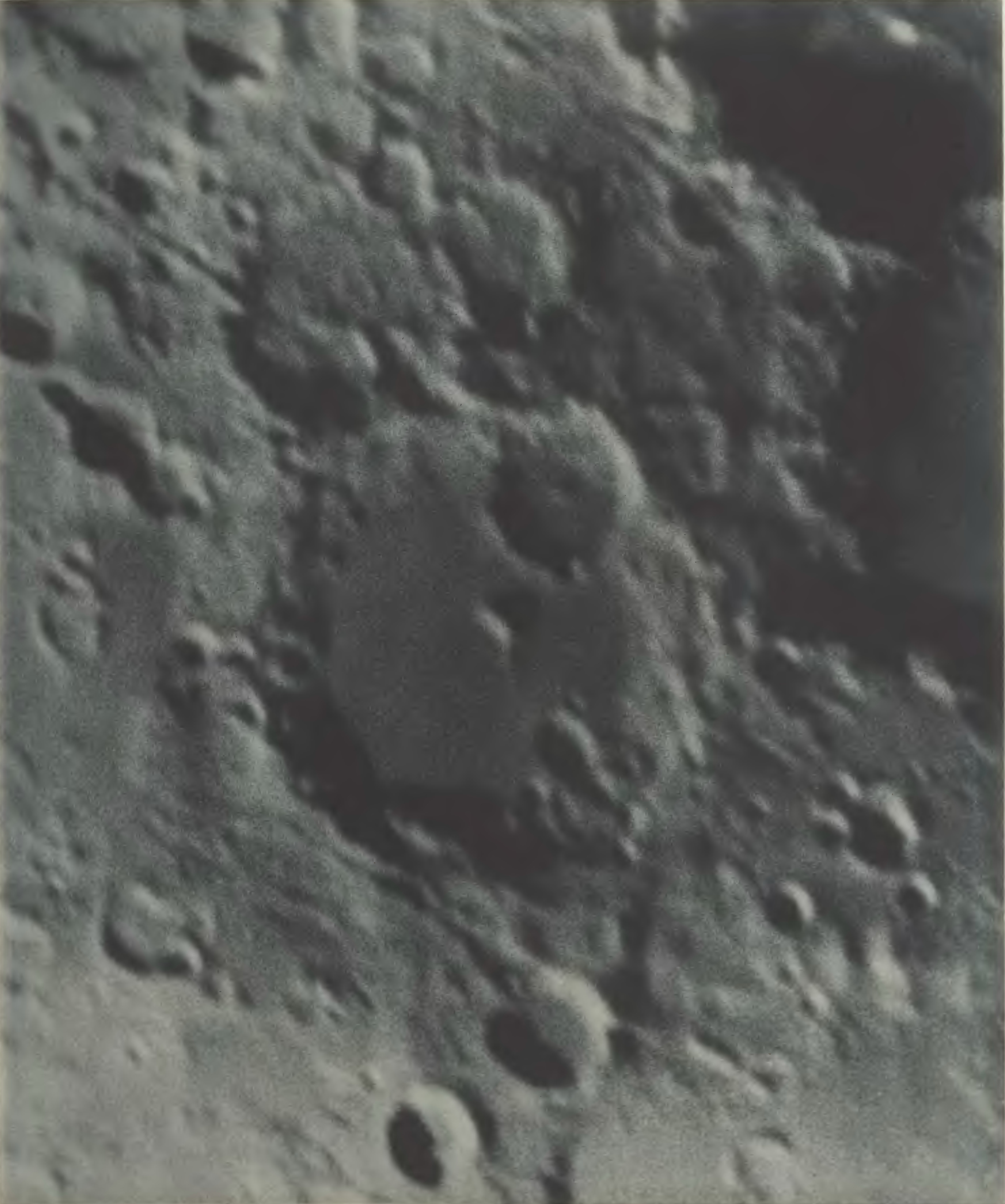
Albategnius crater in the Lunar Atlas (1898) by Ladislaus Weinek. North is upside down.

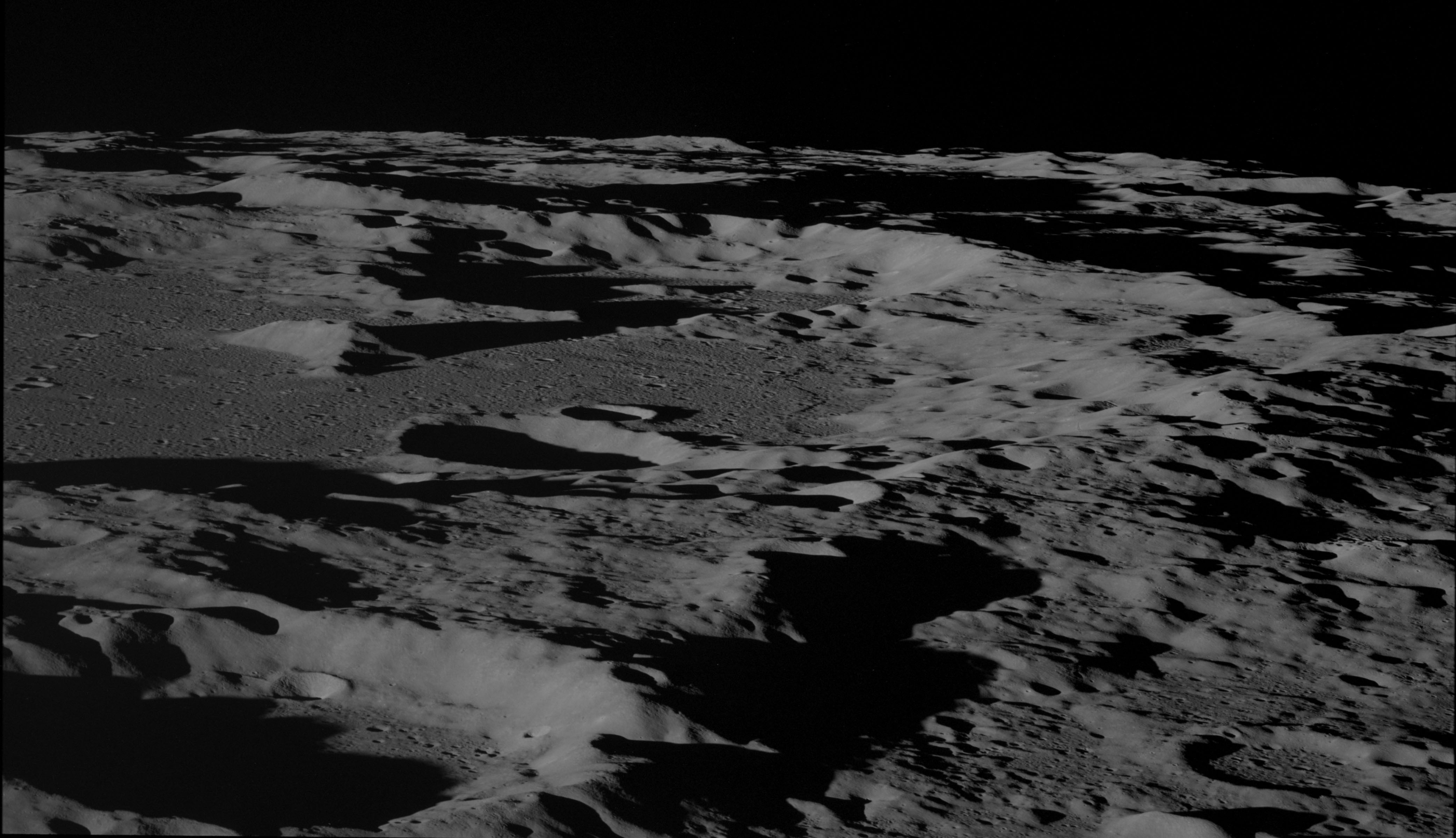
Albategnius crater at the terminator, from Apollo 10.

== See also ==
- Thebit (crater)
