= Hermann Joseph Klein =

German astronomer

- Born: September 14, 1844; Cologne, Germany
- Died: July 1, 1914 (aged 69)
- Education: doctorate
- Alma mater: University of Cologne
- Occupation: astronomer
- Known for: member, Selenographic Society
- Notable work: claimed to have discovered a new crater on the Moon near Hyginus (1878)
- Awards: crater Klein on the Moon is now named after him

Hermann Joseph Klein (14 September 1844 – 1 July 1914) was a German astronomer, author and professor. Born in Cologne, Germany on 14 September 1844, he attained his doctorate from the University of Cologne in 1874, and taught at the school. He was a member of the Selenographic Society and the crater Klein on the Moon is now named after him. In 1878 he claimed to have discovered a new crater on the Moon near Hyginus.

== Bibliography ==
- The Creator's Wonders in Living Nature (Ward, Lock and Company, 1885)
- Star Atlas: Maps of all the stars from 1-6.5 magnitude between the North Pole and 34° south declination
