= Hind (crater) =

Crater on the Moon

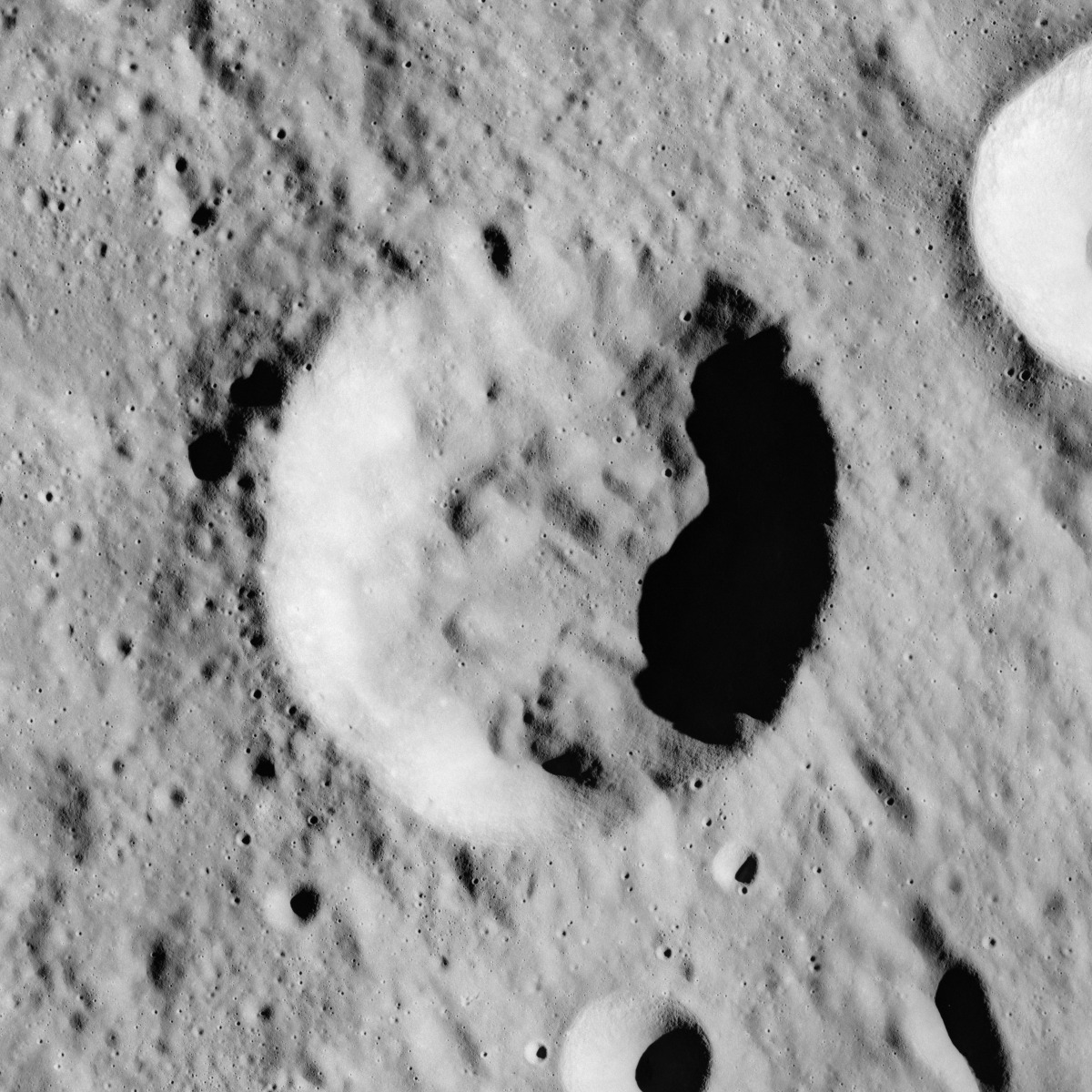
- Apollo 16 image
- Coordinates: 7.9°S 7.4°E
- Diameter: 29 km
- Depth: 3.0 km
- Colongitude: 353° at sunrise
- Eponym: John R. Hind

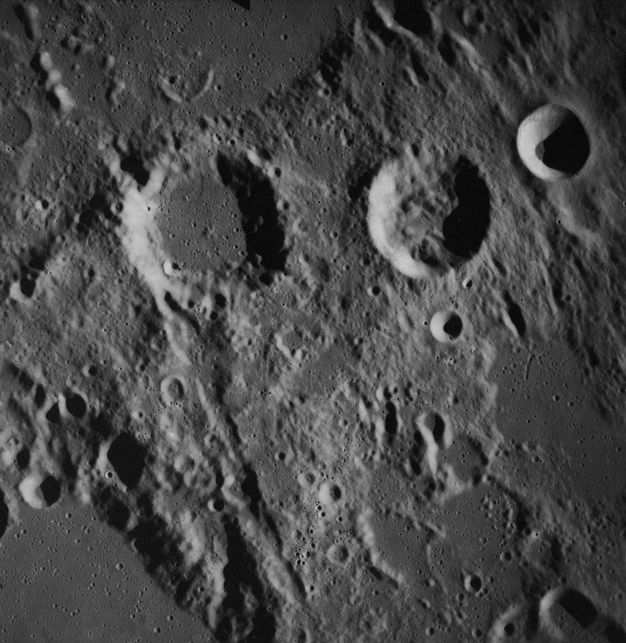
Hind (upper right centre) and Halley (upper left centre) from Apollo 16. At top right is Hipparchus C. Hind C is south of Hind. NASA photo.

Hind is a lunar impact crater that lies to the southeast of a walled plain called Hipparchus, and due east of the crater Halley. Its diameter is 29 km. It was named after British astronomer John Russell Hind. The rim of Hind is relatively free of wear and distortion, except for a break at the north rim. The floor of Hind is relatively uneven, however, compared to the interior of Halley. Hind and the craters Hipparchus C and Hipparchus L form a curved line or arc with diminishing diameters that point to the northeast.

== Southwestern neighbour of Hipparchus C ==
During full moon, the location of Hind is easy to detect due to the proximity of the very bright white looking bowl-shaped crater Hipparchus C. The arc, formed by craters Halley, Hind, bright Hipparchus C and Hipparchus L is also noticeable on the photographic version of chart LAC 77 (page 154) in The Clementine Atlas of the Moon (Ben Bussey / Paul D. Spudis).

== Satellite craters ==
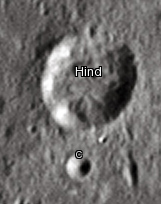
Hind crater and its satellite craters taken from Earth in 2012 at the University of Hertfordshire's Bayfordbury Observatory with the telescopes Meade LX200 14" and Lumenera Skynyx 2-1

By convention these features are identified on lunar maps by placing the letter on the side of the crater midpoint that is closest to Hind.

Hind	Latitude	Longitude	Diameter
C	8.7° S	7.4° E	7 km
