= Samuel Arthur Saunder =

British mathematician and selenographer

Samuel Arthur Saunder (1852 – 8 December 1912) was a British mathematician and selenographer who taught at Wellington College, Berkshire. In 1894 he became a fellow of the Royal Astronomical Society, and in 1908 he was made Gresham Professor of Astronomy giving public lectures on the subject.

Saunder was one of the first to use photography of the Moon to measure and triangulate its features. He was also responsible for pointing out the confused state of lunar nomenclature at the beginning of the 20th century, and initiating the process of standardizing the names of lunar features. The crater Saunder on the Moon was named after him in 1935.
