= Saunder (crater) =

Crater on the Moon

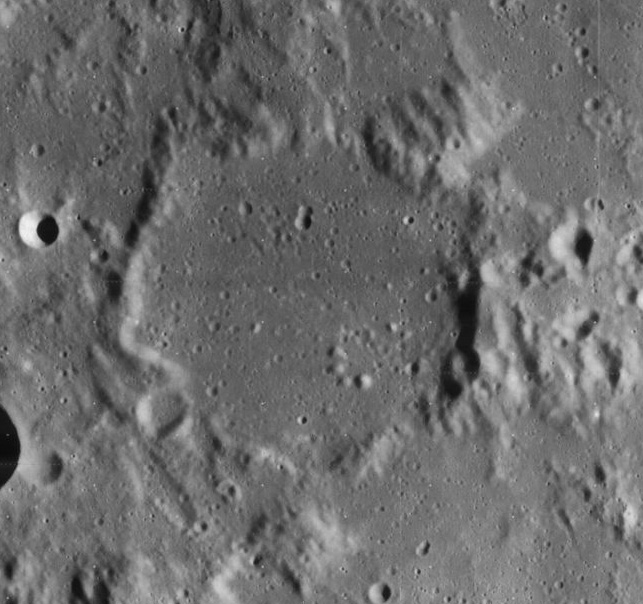
- Lunar Orbiter 4 image
- Coordinates: 4.2°S 8.8°E
- Diameter: 44 km (27 mi)
- Depth: 0.64 km (0.40 mi)
- Colongitude: 352° at sunrise
- Eponym: Samuel A. Saunder

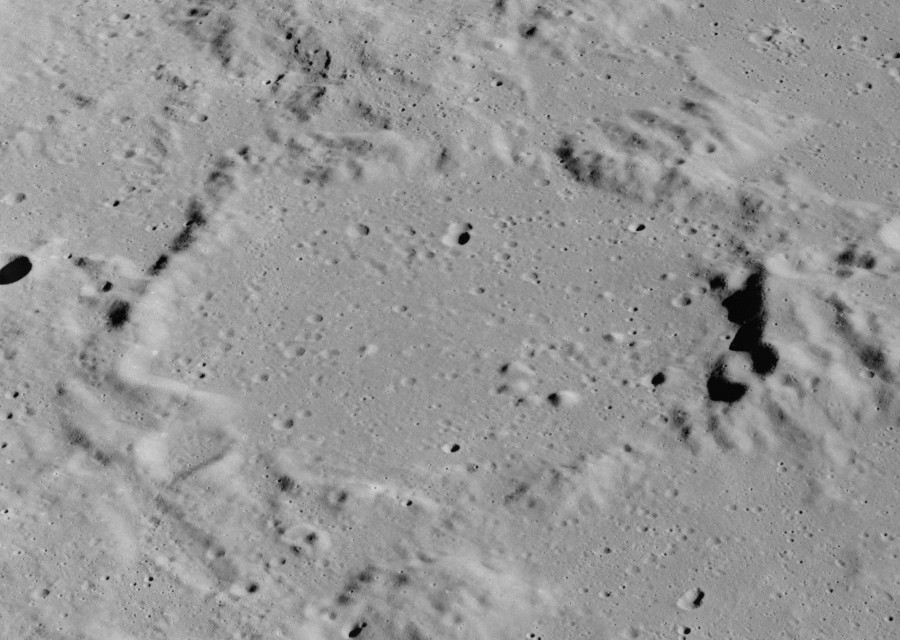
Oblique view from Apollo 16

Saunder is a lunar impact crater located in the central highland region of the Moon, to the east-northeast of the walled plain called Hipparchus. Its diameter is 44 km. It was named after British mathematician Samuel Arthur Saunder. The outer wall is irregular and broken in several locations, forming the overall shape of a pentagon. The interior of Saunder has been flooded with lava, forming a level surface just below the rim. The floor lacks a central peak, but there are low rises in the southeast quadrant and a tiny craterlet towards the north rim.

== Satellite craters ==
By convention these features are identified on lunar maps by placing the letter on the side of the crater midpoint that is closest to Saunder.

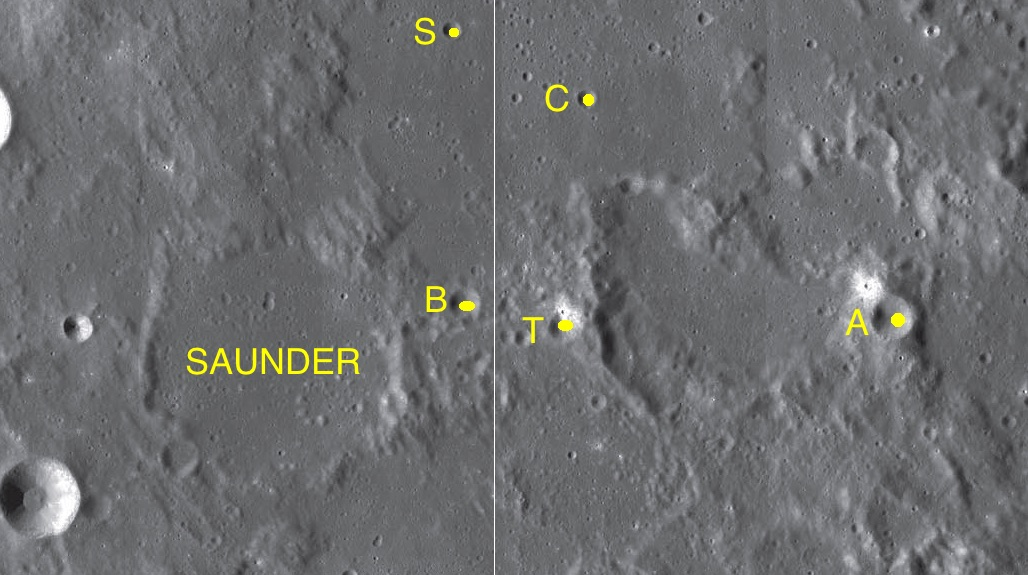
Saunder and its satellite craters

Saunder	Latitude	Longitude	Diameter
A	4.0° S	12.3° E	8 km (5.0 mi)
B	3.9° S	9.8° E	6 km (3.7 mi)
C	2.7° S	10.5° E	4 km (2.5 mi)
S	2.3° S	9.7° E	4 km (2.5 mi)
T	4.0° S	10.4° E	6 km (3.7 mi)
