= List of Battle Angel Alita characters =

The Battle Angel Alita manga series features a cast of characters designed by Yukito Kishiro. The series takes place around the city of Scrapyard where residents, of whom many are heavily modified by cybernetics to better cope with the hard life, are forced to make a living.

The series focuses on Alita, the protagonist and title character, a young cyborg with amnesia struggling to uncover her forgotten past through the only thing she remembers from it: fighting. Early on in the story, Daisuke Ido, a bounty-hunting cybernetic doctor who finds and revives Alita plays a major role as well, but midway through the manga he becomes marginalized as focus begins to increasingly shift to Desty Nova, an eccentric nanotechnology scientist who has fled from Tiphares (Zalem, in Japanese version). Nova is the mastermind behind many of the enemies and trials that Alita faces, but does not make an actual appearance until more than two years into the story, although he is alluded to early on. Finally, Kaos, Desty Nova's son, a frail and troubled radio DJ with psychometric powers, also begins to play a crucial role after he comes in contact with Alita. He broadcasts his popular radio show from the wastelands outside the Scrapyard, staying away from the increasing conflict between Tiphares and the rebel army Barjack.

== Protagonist ==
=== Alita ===
Voiced by: Miki Itō (Japanese); Amanda Winn-Lee (English); Portrayed by Rosa Salazar

Alita or Gally (ガリィ, Garyi) in the original Japanese version, originally named Yoko (陽子, Yōko) before her amnesia, is the main protagonist. She is known for her fighting prowess as a practitioner of the powerful Martian cyborg martial art Panzer Kunst (機甲術, Pantsā Kunsuto; lit. "armor art") and her racing skill at Motorball (モーターボール, Mōtā Bōru), the most popular sport in the western district of Scrapyard. In the manga, Alita is occasionally referred to as "octopus lips" due to her pouty expression. Alita's background and history were briefly hinted at, but were not explored until Last Order and more extensively in Mars Chronicle, which reveals that in her previous life, she was highly instrumental in creating the world within which the manga series are set.

Alita takes on a variety of roles through the manga, starting out as a licensed bounty hunter known as a "hunter-warrior". She later becomes a Motorball player nicknamed the "Killing Angel" and eventually the Top League champion, after which she retired from the game and became a part-time fight instructor and bar singer. Two years later, after being forced to use a firearm (an illegal capital offense) to defeat a berserked Zapan, she is pardoned from execution and recruited by the Tipharean Ground Investigation Bureau for ten years as an elite ground agent of TUNED, a counterinsurgency task force, during which she is nicknamed the "Death Angel" for her prowess, unknowingly also serving as the basis for the development of GIB's combat androids known as the AR (Alita Replica) series which debut towards the end of the original series. In Last Order, she spearheads a combat team called the "Space Angels" which includes three other AR series replicas, and competes in the LADDER-sponsored Zenith of Things Tournament before becoming the first civilian team to win it. During this competition, Alita is given the relic "Fata Morgana" which grants her direct access to the quantum supercomputer Melchizedek and makes her into the Last Order agent.

In the original manga, "Gally"/"Alita" was the name of Ido's pet black cat, who died a month before he found the remains of cyborg girl in the Tiphares junkyard. Gally the cat was a male, and Ido's friend Gonzu comments that it is strange to name a female cyborg after a male cat. The cat makes an appearance in the manga as part of a dream that Alita experiences while being trapped in Desty Nova's Ouroboros program. In the dream, Alita is named "Gally" while the cat is named "Alita". Nova himself appears in this dream as "Uncle Nova", reflecting that he cannot get along with the cat. After Kaos in the guise of a dream Den attempts to rescue the real Alita from the Ouroboros and begins fighting with the giant Great Martian King dream robot, the dream Alita and dream Gally merge, appearing in the form of the real Alita. The side story "Holy Night" reveals that Ido took the original Alita in shortly after he arrived in the Scrapyard, at least five years before he found Alita in the Tiphares junkyard.

In the original manga series, Alita transformed into a Tree of Life in order to save both the cities of Tiphares and Scrapyard, and after five years is reborn as a full-flesh human. This ending was changed in Last Order to Alita being killed by a bomb in an ambush and reconstructed by Desty Nova, although this reborn version is later revealed to be a replica android of her with a brain bio-chip that contains the same memories and combat abilities of the original, while her original organic brain is actually sealed inside a box that she is tasked to carrying the whole time, which is, in its own turn, became attached to an organic version of Alita which, as in the original, find peace in family life with Figure. In Mars Chronicle, her childhood origin story as the cyborg girl Yoko is explored further, as well as her rivalry with her estranged adopted sister Erica.

=== Daisuke Ido ===
Voiced by: Shunsuke Kariya (Japanese); Guil Lunde (English); Portrayed by Christoph Waltz

Daisuke Ido (イド・ダイスケ, Ido Daisuke) is a cybernetics physician (cyberphysician), a doctor who specializes in operations on cyborgs who lives in The Scrapyard. He is responsible for restoring Alita after finding her in the Tiphares dump heap, a massive pile of garbage ejected from Tiphares. Ido also has a second line of work as a hunter-warrior. He is a former citizen of Tiphares, the great floating city suspended over The Scrapyard, as is indicated by the mark on his forehead, and is the first Tipharean introduced. After being expelled from Tiphares for unknown reasons, Ido trained as a cyberphysician and – five years before the main story starts – opened his own clinic.

Ido considers Alita to be like a daughter to him and their relationship progresses through several stages as Alita grows mentally and emotionally. As Ido wanted Alita to remain pure and unsullied, he is originally opposed to her becoming a hunter-warrior, but accepts her decision. He later accepts her decisions to play motorball and "leave the nest" after retiring from motorball. Ido is later nearly driven to madness and erases his own memory after learning the secret of Tiphares. Daisuke Ido has no active role in Battle Angel Alita: Last Order besides appearing in Alita's thoughts, that is until the Alita Quest arc.

In the 2019 film adaptation, his name is changed to Dyson Ido and he is portrayed by Oscar-winning Austrian actor Christoph Waltz.

== Antagonists ==
=== Desty Nova ===
Portrayed by Edward Norton

Desty Nova (ディスティ・ノヴァ, Disuti Nova) is a mad scientist and former citizen of Tiphares, who has used his extensive scientific knowledge and expertise in nanotechnology to save Makaku and Jashugan, as well as resurrect Ido and Alita from states that would normally be classified as "dead", even in this world where cyborgs are commonplace. He fled Tiphares to obtain the freedom necessary to experiment with live humans, a component he deems necessary in his research of karma and psychological capacity. A dream sequence shows that had his situation been different, he could have easily been a loving, protective father figure for Alita. He has injected himself with nanomachines that can repair dismemberment and give him pseudo-immortality. Nova possesses knowledge of the secret of Tiphares, one that could drive its citizens mad if released. Nova has a liking for the dessert cake flan, and can often be seen eating it, boasting that he thinks better while enjoying it.

Although he is the main antagonist in the original series, Nova becomes much more of a neutral, ambiguous figure in Last Order, where he is one of Alita's key allies. Nova has two assistants, but they do not appear in Last Order.

A prodigal scientist who goes beyond the seemingly mad, amoral man and becomes a more complex ally and adviser. He appears in several different incarnations due to his "Stereotomy" ability, an atmospheric nanotechnological process that, should Nova be killed, automatically restores him as he was before death, right down to his memories and even clothing.

- Original Nova: At the end of the original series, Alita decapitates Nova in battle. Nova survives regardless thanks to a second "back-up" brain bio-chip stored in his abdomen. After killing Alita with a bomb, Nova transports her remains to Tiphares and, along with his assistant Jim Roscoe, resurrects her with a new "Imaginos Body" with a neuronal accelerator which gives her unlimited potentials. In the original series, Nova guides Alita to confront the Melchizedek – the deus ex machina of Tiphares – about the truth of Tiphares and Ketheres' history. Nova provokes Melchizedek too far, causing it to go haywire and self-destruct. To save Tiphares from being purged and collide with Scrapyard below, Alita takes an Imaginos trigger given by Nova and sacrificed herself to secure the Sky Hook by fusing with it. Nova immediately regrets giving Alita the trigger, as he cannot bear being saved by her selflessness, and goes completely mad. Five years later, Kiyomi and Figure encounters a senile, insane Nova, who lures them in to a cavern deep in Ketheres, where they find Alita reborn from the Tree of Life with a human body.

This original ending is retconned in Last Order, where Alita wakes up in the new Imaginos Body only to find Nova has died disembowelled a week earlier. A pre-recorded video message then reveals that Nova exposes the brain bio-chip conspiracy to the Tipharean population, resulting in mass insanity quickly spreading and devastating the floating metropolis, culminating in a chaotic two-week civil war. His assistant Roscoe also goes crazy and kills Nova, looting his two brain bio-chips, which later fall into Alita's hands. However, it is later revealed that Nova has already invented the Stereotomy process, which allows him to create reincarnations of himself, making him effectively an immortal presence.

- Nova II: After Roscoe kills the Original Nova, the Stereonomy process creates "Nova II". This version of Nova decides to replace Alita's living brain with a bio-chip before she awakens from her resurrection, placing her brain in a protected crate known as the "F-Box". After Alita awakens, he insinuates himself as an ally of an unsuspecting Alita, offering to help her locate the brain of Lou Collins in exchange for bodyguard duties as he travels to Ketheres. Once at Ketheres, Nova II encounters Aga Mbadi, who explains that he, along with the Tipharean citizenry, are "manufactured" with the eventual goal of producing geniuses such as himself. Mbadi then defeats Alita and her team and captures Nova II, destroying his body and keeping the bio-chips with the intent of assimilating them into his mind; he later decides instead to resurrect Nova II as his new assistant and henchman: "Super Nova".
- Super Nova: Mbadi created a powerful new body for Nova II later dubbed "Super Nova". The bio-chip pair of Nova II are now housed inside the skull and run parallel to each other, similar to Mbadi's own ability, and making this Nova more intelligent yet far more ruthless and vicious. Super Nova is also empowered with a hacking ability similar to Mbadi's, called "Secare Deum"; like his superior, it gives him complete mastery over electronics and machinery in his presence. Super Nova confronts Alita at the Incubator where Lou Collins' brain is held, revealing that the F-Box contains Alita's own brain, and offers a trade in exchange for inserting Alita's brain into the Incubator. He then destroys Alita when she attempts to renege on the deal afterward; Alita survives the ordeal more powerful than ever, but Super Nova remains a serious threat and major villain.
- Porta Nova: After Alita survives her defeat after first meeting Mbadi, she recruits hacker Ping Wu, using the Original Nova's bio-chips as collateral. Wu installs one of the chips into a portable device he dubs "Porta Nova". This version of Nova is incapable of independent movement, but is able to hack into computers alongside Alita and Wu. He accompanies Alita on her mission to raid the Incubator at Ketheres where Lou's brain is held, providing helpful advice and support. As one of the Original Nova's bio-chips, he has no memory of any event later than his death at the hands of Jim Roscoe. Porta Nova is present when Alita encounters Super Nova at the Incubator, and is destroyed completely by Super Nova himself after he refuses to work with his more diabolical persona.
- Nova X: When Nova II's body is destroyed by Mbadi, the Stereotomy process once again creates another version of Nova back on Tiphares. This version of Nova has no unique ability of his own, and has no shared knowledge of events with other Novas after Nova II is killed. Nova X is primarily interested with uniting the surviving Tiphareans against aggression from the outer space factions, often espousing the values of flan as he does so. Nova X is later recruited by Porta Nova to help battle Super Nova, who reveals that all life on Earth is soon to be purged by Ketherean forces. However, when Porta Nova and Alita are both destroyed, Nova X is forced to make a hasty escape.

=== Makaku ===
Portrayed by Jackie Earle Haley

Born as a human, Makaku (魔角(マカク); lit. 'devil horn'), known in Battle Angel OVA as Grewishka (グリュシカ, Guryushika), spent his entire life in the sewers of the Scrapyard, captivated by the life he could see outside. Three years before the beginning of the main story, Makaku was burned with a flamethrower by a pair of Scrapyard pranksters while looking at the goings on through a sewer grate. He survived the attack, but his body began to rot and he nearly died. Desty Nova found Makaku and offered to give him a new, personalized body reflecting his innermost desires.

Makaku's new cyborg body consisted of a large head attached to a long, maggot-like body, which allowed him a great deal of mobility. He was also characterized by his long tongue and tendency to slobber. A large spike on top of his head could be fired as a single use projectile weapon. However, Makaku's deadliest ability was being able to take over the bodies of other cyborgs by using his body to jack into their spinal columns and then remove their heads with his newly won control. He would take over powerful cyborg bodies and use their strength to acquire brains (preferably human, but even dog) in order to eat them to satisfy his endorphin addiction. Makaku justified his existence in destruction, and despite a bounty being placed on him, was so formidable that no hunter-warrior dared go after him for years.

Makaku is the first major adversary that Alita faces. In their first fight, she succeeds in crippling the body that he is then possessing as well as blinding him in his left eye by impaling it with one of her arms. However, her first cyborg body is destroyed in the process. Makaku survives the fight and almost kills Ido by impaling him with his head spike, swearing vengeance on both him and Alita before escaping. He seeks out the reigning champion of the Coliseum, Kinuba, to take over his custom-built Power Body. Makaku then goes up against Alita in her new Berserker Body in the Scrapyard sewers. After a long fight, the Power Body is destroyed and Makaku nearly kills Alita in a plasma explosion that he triggers. However, she creates an electromagnetic barrier to shield them both, enabling her to talk with him. Makaku tells her his life story, revealing that she is the first person who seriously took notice of him by trying to stop him. For the first time in his life, he is at peace as he is consumed by the plasma.

=== Zapan ===
Voiced by: Kōji Totani (Japanese); Aaron Krohn (English); Portrayed by Ed Skrein

Zapan (ザパン, Zapan) was a hunter-warrior who became embittered against Alita after she questioned his bravery in front of the other hunter-warriors at Bar Kansas and defeated him and a large number of them in a brawl. Since this incident he nursed a grudge against her but did not try to confront her directly. He noticed that Alita had taken an interest in Hugo as well as the latter's connection to Vector, who was the top dealer in the Scrapyard's black market parts. Zapan uncovered Hugo and his accomplices as criminals engaged in cyborg spinal column theft and nearly captured him. He reported Hugo to the Factory when he went to collect the bounties on Hugo's accomplices, informing Alita, who was also there, what had happened to Hugo. Deducing that she would attempt to flee with Hugo, Zapan took Daisuke Ido hostage and rounded up numerous hunter-warriors and a netman. He confronted Alita when she was on her way back to Ido's clinic with Hugo's body, but his plan was foiled when it appeared that she had taken Hugo's head. However upon closer investigation he saw that she had connected her life support system to it, keeping his brain alive. When he tried to get the head, the netman warned him that stealing another hunter's bounty was illegal, allowing Alita to attack him and shear his face off. Zapan fell off the high rise they were on, but survived. He later obtained a new face and began working in a soup kitchen with Sara, the daughter of Murdock. Sara accepted Zapan and became his lover despite her father's opposition. The night of Alita's challenge race against Jashugan, Zapan saw the broadcast and was struck by a sudden fear that resulted in him clawing off his second face. He accidentally killed Sara when she tried to stop him and thus became a bounty, being hunted by Murdock for three years.

Murdock finally confronted Zapan in the sewers with his four cyborg dogs, but Alita intervened and gave Zapan the opportunity to attack her while her back was turned and she played a song on a portable keyboard. Zapan could not bring himself to attack and was torn to pieces by Murdock's dogs. However his head survived and was recovered by Barzarld. Desty Nova was able to partially restore Zapan's brain and in response to its deepest desire for revenge, released the safety lock on the Berserker Body to allow the brain to merge with it. However the body went out of control and after fusing with Zapan's brain destroyed Nova's lab and manor, killing Ido who had been there in an attempt to recover the Berserker Body from Nova. Zapan tracked Alita to Bar New Kansas but when he found that she was not there he killed Gonzu and the hunter-warriors who attacked him. Murdock faced him and allowed Shumira and Master to escape, destroying the bar and dying in the process, but Zapan survived. He then went on a rampage through the Scrapyard with Factory Army powerless to stop him. Alita confronted him the following day armed with a Smith & Wesson Model 60 revolver equipped with hollow-point bullets loaded with Collapser nanobots that Nova had developed to destroy the Berserker Body at the molecular level. Despite a close, tough fight, she was able to fire two rounds into Zapan, which caused the Berserker Body to break down. Zapan made a last-ditch attempt to absorb Alita, which she thwarted by swallowing some of the Collapser. Prior to his death Alita saw a vision of him and Sara together in which Zapan expressed regret for what he had done and was forgiven and accepted by Sara. Before hitting the ground, Zapan's last act was to form a pair of wings to break Alita's fall. Despite surviving the fight and defeating Zapan Alita was sentenced to death by the Factory for the Class A crime of using a firearm.

== Supporting characters ==
=== Scrapyard residents ===
==== Gonzu ====
Voiced by: Kazuhiko Kishino (Japanese); Rick Peeples (English)

A former cyber veterinarian who now runs a Japanese food shack, Gonzu (ゴンズ, Gonzu; "Gonz" in the OVA dub) is the closest friend that Ido has in the Scrapyard and is shown visiting Ido at his clinic. He saves Ido after the latter is almost killed by Makaku, and under Ido's direction, transfers Alita from her first cyborg body into the Berserker Body. Gonzu also helps Ido transplant Hugo's head onto a cyborg body. A regular at Bar Kansas, Gonzu is the first person killed by Zapan when he goes to Bar New Kansas in the Berserker Body in search of Alita, accidentally blocking the strike aimed at Shumira.

The side story "Seiyakyoku" reveals that six years before Ido found Alita, he saved Gonzu's life when he found him near death in the street. At this time, Gonzu's food shack was a cart that he pulled. Gonzu aids Ido, who has been rendered homeless, by hosting him and Carol and getting him in touch with the cyberphysician Gauss.

==== Hugo ====
Voiced by: Kappei Yamaguchi (Japanese); Spike Spencer (English); Portrayed by Keean Johnson

Hugo, known in Japan as Jugo (ユーゴ, Yūgo), is Alita's first love. He is an orphaned teenager who was raised by his much older brother and sister-in-law Nana. He ran away from home after Nana betrayed his brother to the hunter-warrior Clive Lee for building an illegal hot air balloon to attempt to fly to Tiphares. Since then he has inherited a burning desire to go to the floating city. He first encountered Vector three years before the start of the main story, when he recognized his brother's hand being sold by one of the latter's dealers, and impressed Vector by voluntarily trading his hand for his brother's, so part of his dead brother can go to Tiphares as well when he goes to there. Believing that Vector could access Tiphares because of his pull in the Scrapyard, he fell for Vector's offer to get him there if he could bring him 10 million chips. Hugo ostensibly performs odd maintenance jobs for Scrapyard residents such as Ido, but has taken to illegally supplementing his income by posing along with his accomplices Tanji and Van, as a lubrication crew for cyborgs. They then ambush and paralyze their victims to steal their spinal columns, as these fetch the highest prices on the black market for body parts.

Alita meets Hugo during her hunt for the criminal Megil, and is impressed by his willingness to protect her even though he is grossly outmatched. The two then strike up a friendship which Alita makes clear she would like to take further, and she embarks on a bounty-hunting spree to help Hugo reach his 10 million chip mark. However Hugo is blinded by his obsession with Tiphares and does not reciprocate Alita's romantic interest in him. After his run in with Zapan, Hugo becomes a marked bounty. Despite learning the truth about him, Alita is still willing to go with him to Tiphares. He is mortally wounded by Clive Lee, and is only saved by Alita linking her life support to his severed head. Transplanted into a cyborg body by Ido, Hugo learns the reality that a surface dweller such as himself has no hope of reaching Tiphares. After confronting Vector with this, who also confesses it, Hugo snaps and attempts to climb one of the Factory tubes that connects Tiphares to the Scrapyard. He makes it up further than any previous person, but is crippled by a massive spiked defense ring dropped down the tube. Alita is able to reach him just before a second one is dropped, but cannot save him, as his torso is shredded. Hugo is able to share his last words with Alita before falling to his death. This subsequently leads Alita to run away from home and turn to Motorball for distraction.

==== Vector ====
Voiced by: Shigeru Chiba (Japanese); Tristan MacAvery (English); Portrayed by Mahershala Ali

Vector (ベクター, Bekutā) is a Scrapyard businessman – the top broker in illegal human body parts and organs – with a reputation for hiring powerful cyborg muscle to back him up. Vector furthermore supplies Tiphares, on a monthly basis, with one person's worth of body parts and organs. Last Order reveals that Vector came from a poor village on the outskirts of the city, and due to the ability to instantly judge whether anyone was lying to him, became the most powerful magnate in the Scrapyard.

The original series reveals that Vector is assisted by Myra, unnamed in the Japanese version, who works for Vector out of a mobile clinic. Vector buys stolen spinal columns from Hugo and – knowing that no-one can go to Tiphares – offered to send Hugo to Tiphares for 10 million chips. Although he used Hugo, Vector has some honor: he repeatedly protected Hugo by killing witnesses and hiding Hugo, and offered Hugo partnership of the supply routes (a highly lucrative position). Vector later sustains serious injury and escapes with his life after meeting with Den as the Barjack closed in on Tiphares, but is instrumental in restoring peace and order to the Scrapyard when Tiphares almost collapses and the factories shut down.

Vector also appears in the 1993 OVA where he has a stake in the Coliseum gladiators (in addition to his black market dealings). He also he has more control over exports to Zalem (Tiphares). He is killed in the OVA when he is impaled after being confronted by Ido over Hugo. In the live-action movie, he is occasionally used as a vessel by Nova when he needs to speak with others. He is stabbed through the torso by Alita while Nova was using him to taunt her.

==== Shumira ====
Shumira (シュミラ, Shumira) is Jashugan's somewhat naïve, but warm-hearted younger sister. She is saved from being raped by two thugs by Ido while he is searching for Alita, a month after she ran away following Hugo's death. When he shows her a holographic image of Alita, Shumira recognizes her as a Motorball player, taking Ido to a circuit where Alita is racing and introducing him to the sport. She hosts Ido at her apartment for a week, after which they watch Jashugan at a race where he suffers a flatline attack, during which Ido has to use her brainwaves in order to successfully resuscitate Jashugan. Shumira meets Alita in person when she, Jashugan and Ido come across Alita and Ed at a Scrapyard open air restaurant. She covets Kimji, Alita's odd rotor wing pet (actually a Tipharean surveillance drone sent to spy on Alita), and asks if she can have him if Alita loses to Jashugan in arm wrestling. As a precaution for the next flatline attack, Ido creates a direct interface that will allow him to transmit Shumira's brainwaves via radio to Jashugan's brain. Prior to his challenge race with Alita, Jashugan receives a good luck necklace from Shumira and tells her to marry Ido. He then sedates her, nullifying any effect to resuscitate him should he have another flatline attack. Shumira thus does not see her brother's final race and subsequent death.

Two years after Alita quits Motorball, Shumira is working as a waitress at Bar New Kansas. She narrowly misses being killed by Zapan when he arrives in search of Alita, and survives the destruction of the bar. Along with the Bar New Kansas barkeep Master and his adopted daughter Koyomi, she winds up at a refugee camp on the outskirts of the Scrapyard, where she meets her future husband, a soup server. Shumira stays with the volunteer group and eventually she and her husband have eight children.

==== Koyomi ====
Portrayed by Lana Condor

Koyomi (コヨミ) started out as an orphan adopted by the barkeep of the Bar Kansas, Master, then becoming a member of the rebel army Barjack, and then a freelance photographer who publishes a bestselling photo journal. The manga never reveals her family history nor her surname. Koyomi first appears as a baby when Daisuke Ido and Alita visits Bar Kansas, and she is subsequently kidnapped by Makaku in order to lure Alita into a fight, only to be saved by her father's dog, Duke Fang. She later forms a bond with Fury, Murdock's cyborg dog and in turn softens Murdock himself. At age 13, Koyomi ran away from home with Fury after argument with her alcoholic adopted father, encountering Kaos and reaching the underground ruins of a city from the previous era and eventually, meeting Den. Convinced by what Den says about Tiphares' evils, Koyomi joins the Barjack and participates their campaigns, drawing closer and closer to the Scrapyard where B.B. Buick gives her his camera just before he dies. A year after Den's defeat, Koyomi compiles Buick's photos into a book titled Barjack War Chronicle that becomes the Scrapyard's greatest bestseller on record.

Koyomi appears in Last Order as a 14-year-old boarding with her father in a southern district antiques shop when she witnesses Kaos being run over by a taxi and subsequently helps him. She later witnesses Kaos's transformation (when he receives the paper airplane that Alita had thrown from Tiphares) and Vector's subsequent agreement to fund the Tower of Tiphares. Koyomi is the focus of the side story "Barjack Rhapsody", in which she acts on a tip that a resurrected Den has been ambushing Scrapyard supply convoys. As a result of her dealings with the eccentric Geriperi and the ambitious manager of Farm 3, Eakins, she eventually discovers a purpose in life. The side story further reveals that Koyomi is a celebrity among the Barjack because of a photograph Buick took of her and Fury, which he subsequently sold.

In the 2019 live-action film, Koyomi is already a teenager who hangs out with Hugo and Tanji. She does not display any of her photography skills and does not seem to be aware of their side business.

=== Motorball-affiliated ===
The following fictional characters are affiliated with the sport of Motorball.

==== Jashugan ====
Portrayed by Jai Courtney

Jashugan, known in Japan as Jashgun (ジャシュガン, Jashugan), is the reigning Top League champion of Motorball, the most popular sport in the western district of Scrapyard, which is a cross between gladiatorial combat and speed skating. Jashugan is perhaps the one opponent in the series whom Alita respects the most, largely because they are similar in many respects. The two also "see each other as competitive rivals instead of hated enemies". Jashugan's only family is his slow-witted younger sister Shumira, who comes back with Ido and Alita to the eastern district to work as a waitress in Bar New Kansas.

Jashugan's background prior to his Motorball career is not revealed, nor how long he has been competing in the sport. In ES 571, five years before Ido found Alita in the Tiphares junkyard, Jashugan was a rookie in the highest Motorball league, the Top League. He and his rival Esdoc were involved in a deadly accident in which Jashugan sustained massive brain damage. He would have died had not Desty Nova intervened and performed reconstructive brain surgery on him. Using a Tipharean technology called Gehirnumbau (German for "brain rebuild"), Nova used nanomachines to rebuild the column structure of Jashugan's cerebral cortex and strengthen his neurons with artificial proteins. The reconstruction not only helped Jashugan survive, but also enhanced his reflexes and allowed him to become the Motorball champion. This was in stark contrast to Ed, who also survived but became dependent on acceleration drug injections to stay competitive, which resulted in a side effect called "Terminal Frost" which forced his eventual retirement. The relationship between the two is cordial, but deep down Ed still seeks to surpass Jashugan, and tries to do this vicariously through Alita after he becomes her manager years later in ES 578.

Jashugan paid a high price for his brain reconstruction as a side effect has been the constant risk of death, and he has suffered an increasing series of spasmatic attacks that have caused his heart rate to flatline. He has recovered from these attacks on his own in the past, but during a race that is watched by Daisuke Ido, Shumira, Alita and Ed, he is forced to pit by one of these attacks, it takes Ido's intervention to save his life. After this, Jashugan knows that his death is near, but cannot reconcile himself to his "absolute death".

Jashugan is a master of the Maschine Klatsch, a formidable cyborg martial art of which he is the only practitioner of following the death of his master shortly before his own death. He is also adept at focusing his chi, which enables him to concentrate a lot of power into even a normal civilian cyborg body and defeat opponents in powered-up cyborg bodies. After Ed's retirement, no other Motorball player can match him in combat except for Alita and her Panzer Kunst. Jashugan is so good that when he races, he must handicap himself by removing his right arm and face three-man challenge teams. His Motorball body has two grinders built into each arm capable of rotating at high speeds, which increases the deadliness of his Maschine Klatsch as they can tear through cyborg armor and dismember opposing players. Nonetheless, his flatline attacks have resulted in him participating in fewer races over time.

After she meets Jashugan, Alita challenges him to an arm wrestling match with her heart literally as the stakes. The match appears to end as a draw, during which Jashugan calls stop after overloading 80% of Alita's arm actuators, but Jashugan afterwards drops his arm and notes that he would have lost had it gone on for longer. To save Alita face, he proposes that they meet again on the Motorball circuit on the condition that she assemble a challenge team of at least five members including herself. Knowing that he is close to death, the match is the one thing that he has to look forward to in order to fight for Shumira and uphold his honor as champion. Prior to the race, Ido, hired as Jashugan's personal tuner, prepared a direct interface so he could transmit Shumira's brainwaves to Jashugan's brain if necessary should he suffer another flatline as a contingency, a measure he took that saved Jashugan before. Jashugan nullifies this however, by administering a sedative to his younger sister, setting himself up for a deathmatch with Alita.

During the challenge race, Jashugan rips through Alita's teammates in seconds, leaving the two of them alone to fight it out. Trading blow for blow, Jashugan nearly has Alita at one point, but she is saved by Tiegel (Alita's clumsiest teammates, who manages to distract Jashugan for a few seconds). In the final moments of their battle, right when he's about to win, Jashugan suffers a flatline attack and becomes unable to move. Alita then deals him a killing blow, however, Jashugan's fighting spirit is so strong that he manages to reanimate his "dead" body through raw chi power. He stands up, attacks Alita and completely defeats her before "dying" for good. However, as the rule of the game is 'last man standing', Alita becomes the new champion after Jashugan's death.

The side story "Sonic Finger" shows Alita and Jashugan's fight on TV and reveals that Alita has a poster of Jashugan on her apartment wall which she greets each morning when she is living on her own after retiring from Motorball. Twelve years after their match when Alita infiltrates Desty Nova's hideout, the Granite Inn, in search of Nova, she encounters Jashugan in a dream sequence when she is trapped by Nova's Ouroboros program. Forced to confront her inner doubts and fears, Alita fights Jashugan again and, this time, defeats him. He congratulates her and encourages her to "aspire to reach heights I was unable to attain". Alita's victory enables her to break out of the Ouroboros and confront Nova. Kishiro has said of this second fight that Alita and Jashugan "had to confront each other again", as "many things had not been said" during their first fight. Jashugan has also appeared in Alita's thoughts in Last Order, when she was fighting Caerula Sanguis.

==== Alita's Challenge Team ====
After Hugo's death, Alita ran away from Ido. She was shortly afterwards found crying in a bar by Ed, who recruited her to become a Motorball player and signed her to a 12-race contract. When Ido finds out that she has become a Motorball player a month later, Alita has already become a popular player nicknamed the "Killing Angel", going on to win five straight races in the Third League before moving up to the Second League and picking up a sponsor, Mr. Thompson. She successfully defeats Ajakutty in a practice match over the player number 99, earning the right to wear the number in the Second League and Ajakutty's respect. After directly challenging Jashugan, Alita is only shown competing in her debut race in the Second League, from which she determines who will make up her five-man challenge team. Against Ed's wishes, she plans to quit Motorball after the challenge race with Jashugan, having completed her racing contract. In the challenge race, Jashugan successfully defeats Alita's teammates, leaving the two of them alone to duel. Forced to fight harder than she ever has before, Alita is severely damaged by Jashugan's final attack, but manages to survive him. She carries out her promise and retires from Motorball afterwards.

The following players were selected by Alita to be the members of her five-man challenge team against Jashugan.

===== Ajakutty =====
Portrayed by Marko Zaror

League: Second
Player Number: 99/88
Nicknames: "King Crusher", "The Crownless King"

Ajakutty, the original player to wear number 99 in the Second League before Alita qualified for it, refuses to give up the number to Alita, who wore it in the Third League and is determined to keep wearing it without a fight. In a best-of-three-round practice match, he wins the first round but loses the second. Recognizing Alita’s superior abilities, Ajakutty forfeits the third round and gives her the number. She earns his respect, and he becomes her closest ally in motorball. Ajakutty calls Alita “Sister” rather than using her name, and she, in turn, calls him “Ajy.”

Ajakutty relishes the fight more than the victory. His ranking of 23rd is therefore deceptive, as he has crashed more than 200 players. His fighting style, which he calls the “Asian Arts,” emphasizes kicks. Three other players—Balgerald, Skaramasakus, and Halberd—are Ajakutty’s disciples, each specializing in a particular discipline. In his first race with Alita, Ajakutty faces Armblessed, the Second League champion, for the first time after Armblessed has defeated two of his students, leaving Ajakutty barely alive. He is the third member of the challenge team to be eliminated by Jashugan. Like Armblessed, he survives the encounter and is recovered from the track. After Alita quits motorball following her match with Jashugan, Ajakutty labels her an outsider, realizing that she is not in it for the game.

===== Armblessed =====
League: Second
Player Number: 1
Nickname: "Caligula"

The arrogant, vicious Second League champion, Armblessed is renowned for his cruelty and commands a fanatical following among his fans, who willingly offer their hands to be cut off by him and placed on his horns (the "Hands of Victory") as part of his pre-win ritual during races. His weapons are diamond-edged chain blades built into his arms and legs that can cut through any other player's armor. Armblessed uses his blades to deliver devastating cuts that slice his opponents vertically and horizontally.

During Alita's Second League race debut, Armblessed makes short work of both Halberd and Bargerald, provoking a fight with Ajakutty. Letting the latter take his right leg, he extends a spike from his body that he uses as the basis for his Gushiken (the "Taiwanese Spin"), which makes him spin like a top along the track and slice whoever is in his way to pieces with his chain blades. After crippling Ajakutty, Armblessed gets into a fight with Alita in which his chain blades are matched up against her Damascus blades, with Alita coming out on top and Armblessed flying off the track and out of the race. Still arrogant in defeat, Armblessed is nonetheless chosen against his will to be a member of Alita's challenge team. He is the first player to be taken on by Jashugan, who, impervious to his chain blades, uses his arm rotors to tear Armblessed's body to shreds. Jashugan then uses one of Armblessed's chain blades that has been severed from him to slice Zafal Takie in two and prevent her from securing the motorball. Armblessed's head survives and he is picked up off the track along with Ajakutty by a recovery team.

===== Zafal Takie =====
League: Second
Player Number: 7
Nickname: "Crimson Wind"

Zafal Takie is the only other female motorball player shown besides Alita. She relies on her speed and technique as opposed to fighting prowess to win, being skilled enough to get within speaking distance of Alita without the latter noticing until the last minute. Since her debut, she has won three straight races. In her fourth race she succeeded in maneuvering Skaramasakus off the track and into the crash area, claiming the motorball. She then challenged Alita, winning their initial confrontation and forcing Alita to pit. However, Takie lost their second confrontation when Alita returned to the track. Her performance earns her a spot on Alita's challenge team. During the challenge race, she is sliced in two by one of Armblessed's chain blades wielded by Jashugan while reaching for the motorball. It is implied that she survived because her brain remained intact, although she is not explicitly shown being picked up by a recovery crew.

===== Tiegel =====
League: Second
Player Number: 50
Nicknames: "The Shame of the Second", "Walking Last Place"

Holding the lowest average in the Second League, Tiegel is the largest motorball player seen. Heavily armored and nearly impervious to attack, his bulk also makes him ponderously slow. Tiegel does not have any special abilities, but is very persistent. He is in love with Alita, and begs her to let him join her challenge team both on and off the track. Alita's duel with Zafal Takie during her Second League debut gives Tiegel an unexpected victory during the race, provoking a riot among the spectators and earning him a spot on the team. During the challenge race with Jashugan, he attempts to ram the champion but crashes into a wall. When pulled out by a recovery team, he revives, intervening in the fight between Jashugan and Alita just in time to prevent the former from finishing her off. This time Tiegel succeeds in slamming Jashugan into a wall, but Jashugan's attacks break through his armor, triggering a series of explosions and setting his body ablaze. His final act is to ram Jashugan into another section of the wall, expressing his lack of regret over not quitting Motorball because he had the chance to fight the champion.

==== Others ====
===== Esdoc ("Ed") =====
Voiced by: Akimasa Ōmori

A former Motorball player, Ed is Alita's manager and his racing team is named Esdoc Motors. In his prime, his blade techniques were as good as Jashugan's Maschine Klatsch and they were rivals. However, both were severely injured in an accident, from which Ed had to resort to acceleration drug injections to stay competitive. His abuse of the drug resulted in a permanent condition called "Terminal Frost", which forced him to retire from motorball and makes his hands shake uncontrollably at unpredictable times, although it can be controlled with medications.

Ed recruited Alita shortly after she ran away from Ido following Hugo's death, and has dreams of getting her into the top league, so he can vicariously fulfill his dream of challenging and eventually surpassing Jashugan. He is violently opposed to Alita's plans to quit motorball after her match with Jashugan, when she will have fulfilled her 12 race contract, and plans to have her contract renewed. When a junky with a homemade gun tries to kill Alita, Ed shields her, taking a fatal shot that blows off the top of his head. His last act is to give Alita her Damascus Blades that he had reforged into a single blade.

Unbeknownst to Alita, Ed sold her Berserker Body, which had been in storage, while she was fitted out with her Motorball body in an attempt to keep her on the circuit. That body was later acquired by Desty Nova and fitted onto Zapan.

===== Umba =====
Voiced by: Toku Nishio

A fat, very short cyborg, Umba is an ace mechanic, responsible for repairing Alita's Motorball body as well as tuning and upgrading it. He uses a tracked harness from which he hangs suspended for increased mobility and height. When Alita is damaged following her confrontation with Takie, Umba proves that he is skilled enough to be able to absorb enough information from 15 sensors in order to control a 20 arm "octopus" exoskeleton, in effect performing the work of ten engineers and getting Alita back onto the track in less than six minutes. Umba has agoraphobia, and is no fun on an outing according to Esdoc. Devastated following Esdoc's death, he nevertheless does not try to dissuade Alita from her decision to quit motorball after the match with Jashugan. Two years later, Umba starts a successful engineering company with Mr. Thompson and writes to Alita about her Berserker Body, which he has managed to track down to Desty Nova after Ed sold it.

=== Barjack ===
The Barjack (バージャック, Bājakku; also written as 馬借) are an outlaw military force regarded as bandits by residents of the Scrapyard who remain unaware of their motive: to destroy Tiphares and with it, the Factory and the Scrapyard. Comprising Badlands dissidents who felt disenfranchised by the Tiphares-dominated system, the Barjack is predominantly a well equipped mobile ground force and is formally organized into ranks and units, although there is no formal inclusion criteria for members. Notable Barjack members include Den, the Barjack's charismatic samurai founder; Koyomi K., the rebellious daughter of the Bar Kansas owner; Knucklehead, a former bandit; B.B. Buick, a "special prisoner"; Colonel Bozzle, a former member of the Green Beret Tribe; and Kayna, a cyborg nurse.

The Barjack switches to guerilla warfare after five years of fighting when their railway gun, Heng, fails to destroy Tiphares. The deployment of 11 TUNED AR units against the Barjack leaves the fate of the remaining Barjack forces uncertain in Battle Angel Alita, although the side story "Barjack Rhapsody" reveals that substantial numbers of Barjack survived and are willing to take up the cause again.

==== Kaos ====
Kaos (ケイオス, Keiosu) is Desty Nova's son and a popular late-night radio host. He is extremely fragile. Kaos only sees in infrared wavelengths and hears and speaks at radio wavelengths. Those that see him in person must use special transceivers for communication. Kaos is an expert of psychometry, a unique talent to read the memories of inanimate objects. For example, he can channel the memories of a katana to learn sword skills and the memories of a computer to hack it. He and his team of molemen dig up artifacts from the bygone era, and he uses the memories contained in these artifacts as the basis for his radio show. Kaos also has a dark side in the form of Den, a manifestation of uncontrollable rage that has been with him since he was a child. Although Den exists in a physical form, he and Kaos are linked by an EPR transmitter Nova installed in Kaos' chest.

==== Den ====
Den (電, "lightning") is Kaos's alternate personality and appears as a giant remote-controlled slave unit run from a transmitter embedded in Kaos' chest. Den was within Kaos since he was young, and whenever this rage manifested itself, Kaos became homicidal but had no memories of what happened to him when this part of his psyche took over: Nova learned of Den when Den burst forth, nearly resulting in Nova and Bazarld's deaths, and installed a transmitter into Kaos' heart and nervous system, to make him independent of Kaos' body by providing him with a slave body (He can however, use the transmitter to take control of Kaos' body without his knowledge, and the death of Kaos will mean the death for both of them). After being created by Nova, Den went to the wasteland to find himself and train as a warrior, and found his purpose to find a suitable body to contain his rage and rule the desert. The story reveals that Den developed the firm belief that Tiphares is the source of the surface dwellers' pain and misery, and that anyone associated with Tiphares, the Factory, or the Scrapyard is corrupt, and formed the Barjack to wage war against Tiphares. He later gets fatally wounded by Factory ground forces when he charges the Scrapyard in a last attempt to attack Tiphares after the Barjack's railway gun, Heng, fails to destroy it.

The side story Barjack Rhapsody reveals that two more remote-controlled bipedal bodies of Den exists: one was found by Eakins, the manager for Farm 3, who plans to revive the Barjack as a bandit organization, and the other is in the care of Geriperi, an old eccentric. These two Dens duel each other at the Barjack revival meeting, in which the second Den (operated by Geriperi) triumphs and leaves after ordering the remaining Barjack to assist in the construction of the Tower of Tiphares.

=== Ground Investigation Bureau (GIB) ===
==== Lou Collins ====
Lou Collins, known in Japan as Rew Collins (ルウ・コリンズ, Ruu Korinzu), is Alita's operator who is brought in after Alita and Figure part ways. She is a bit clumsy and often gets overwhelmed by work. On her first day, she makes a bad first impression on Chief Bigott by pulling a gun on him in self-defense because she thought he planned to sexually assault her by leading her down an obscure back stairway to the GIB, and is thoroughly embarrassed when Bigott reveals that he is gay. Unbeknownst to Lou, she along with Dr. Russell was brought in by Bigott in an attempt to curb Alita's intransigence. Somewhat ditzy, Lou nevertheless has a good heart. She is new at her job, having placed first in her class in simulations, and tries to get along with Alita. Lou provides Alita with intelligence, logistical, technical and combat support. She can also remote control the "mobile unit", a single-wheeled drone motorcycle that is issued to Alita as personal transport, as well as broadcast her voice from it. Through Alita's experiences, Lou eventually becomes her friend, and starts to develop a more sympathetic view of the world below Tiphares. She gives Kaos plans for the "Tower of Tiphares", a 2,500 metres (2,700 yd) tower connecting Tiphares to the Scrapyard that can be constructed with the existing scrap on the surface. She also agrees to help Alita by deleting the information regarding Den and Kaos from the GIB's systems.

Lou has saved Alita's life on two occasions. The first occurred while Alita was dueling Den and was almost impaled by his yari, Lou grabbed Alita out of harm's way with her remotely controlled drone motor unicycle. The second time occurred when Alita was fighting the replica android AR-2, and as Alita was about to lose the fight and be finished off, Lou threatened AR-2's operator with her pistol and shot and destroyed AR-2's control terminal, freezing AR-2 and allowing Alita to decapitate the android. Lou is consequently dismissed from the GIB and sent to the Medical Inspection Bureau (MIB) to be "treated". The knowledge of Lou's sacrifice and Bigott's promise to let her go free after apprehending Desty Nova motivate Alita to complete her original mission. When she is brought to Tiphares by Nova in her new Imaginos Body, she finds out that Lou is to be cast down from Tiphares' garbage chute for forming a friendship with a surface dweller, and manages to save her just in time. Due to her naivety, Lou is the least emotionally traumatized when the secret of Tiphares is unveiled to her, the only side effect she suffers being the cessation of her hiccups (much to her joy). She accompanies Alita and Nova to confront Melchizedek and witnesses the result of Alita's injecting her Imaginos Body with a trigger serum given by Nova, enabling her to go through a transmutation and create the Life-Tree that prevented Tiphares from crashing into the Scrapyard. Subsequently, Lou eventually marries Kaos, who she had a crush on while monitoring Alita's Badlands mission against the Barjacks.

==== Bigott Eizenburg ====
The stern, no-nonsense chief of the GIB, Bigott Eizenburg (ビゴット・アイゼンバーグ, Bigotto Aizenbāgu) intervenes just before Alita's brain is destroyed for committing a Class A offense to recruit her for the TUNED project. Although the GIB has a team of operators who provide logistical, intelligence, and technical support, he personally monitors and oversees Alita's operations and actions. Alita's independent attitude and willingness to disobey orders frustrate Bigott. In order to reduce her rebelliousness, he brings in Dr. Russell and Lou Collins as people whom she can warm up to. While escorting Lou to the GIB on her first day through a back stairwell, she pulls a gun on him as she thinks that he plans to force himself on her, but Bigott reveals that he is homosexual and has no interest in her.

More than a week after Alita duels Den, Bigott dismisses Dr. Russell for his opposition to replacing Alita with the TUNED AR series. When AR-2 confronts Alita, he reveals that her value to the GIB was never more than a sample for creating the perfect series of combat androids that would be totally obedient. After Alita defeats AR-2, he has her continue with her original mission of apprehending Desty Nova with the promise that she can leave the TUNED after its completion. Bigott meanwhile has the rest of the AR series conduct anti-Barjack operations, and uses the Tipharean superweapon Abaddon to destroy the Barjack's giant railway gun Heng. After Alita infiltrates the Granite Inn but gets trapped by Nova's Ouroboros program, Bigott sells her out, offering her to Nova and inviting him back to Tiphares with Melchizedek and the Ladder's approval. When the secret of Tiphares is revealed to Bigott, he slices off the top of his own head to see for himself. Seeing his own bio-chip brain, he goes insane, and is shortly after killed along with the rest of the GIB by the MIB. Bigott makes a brief appearance in the side story "Furusato" in which Alita is still a member of the TUNED.

==== TUNED AR Series ====
During her time as agent of GIB, the organization documented all of Alita's combat experiences including the Panzer Kunst techniques. This was done without Alita's knowledge, as part of a plan to create a series of mass-produced TUNED replicas all with the abilities of Alita but fully loyal to GIB and Tiphares. Their very existence is a result of the Secret of Tiphares, as their solid-state brains are the same bio-chips that are used in Tipharean citizens.

In all, 11 TUNED replicas were produced, each designated as AR, i.e., "Alita Replicas" (GR in the Japanese version, i.e., "Gally Replicas"), and numbered 2 to 12, whereas Alita herself was designated as A-1 (G-1). All TUNED replicas have or had knowledge of basic Panzer Kunst and are able to use special attacks like the Hertza Haeon (Sechs used it in a puppet body as well as in his Fizziroy Body) and Einzug Rüstungen (AR-2 used it against Alita). Eventually, all but three of the 11 replicas are killed – AR-2 is killed in combat by Alita herself, AR-10 is killed when dragged into molten metal by the cyborg dog Fury, while AR-6 goes on a killing spree and eliminated all the remaining replicas except AR-11 and AR-12.

The following AR series replicas have appeared as characters that survive in Last Order.

===== AR-6/Sechs =====
Sechs (ゼクス, Zekusu; "Six" in German) appears in Last Order as the sixth 'TUNED AR/GR Series 2' robot copy of Alita/Gally. After the shut down of the GIB, the abandoned AR-6/GR-6 renamed itself Sechs, and found new purpose through combat, hunting down and destroying the other copies. Intending to ultimately destroy Alita in single combat, surpass the original, and earn the right to exist as a real warrior. After being defeated by Alita, and having the TUNED body destroyed, Sechs is temporarily put inside of Alita's old interactive interface to use as a body. After registering for the Z.O.T.T., Sechs transitions into the anatomically male Fizziroy body, made of cutting edge polyethylene materials, and different from his initial make as a replica of Alita.

===== AR-11/Elf and AR-12/Zwölf =====
Elf (エルフ, Erufu; "Eleven" in German) and Zwölf (ツヴェルフ, Tsuverufu; "Twelve" in German) appears in Last Order as the only two TUNED units to escape Sechs' killing spree. Throughout the series they appear as cuter twin versions of Alita, supplying comic relief and craziness through personality, dress styles and fighting styles. They are seen together, acting like twins, although they call each other best friends. At first they worked as singers in Barjack City before they became Desty Nova's bodyguards, and eventually they enter the Zenith of Things Tournament (Z.O.T.T.) as "Dark Alita" (Zwölf) and "White Alita" (Elf) of the Space Angels team.

=== Other ===
Hunter-warriors are bounty hunters in the Scrapyard who are registered with the Factory. This makes them eligible to pursue wanted criminals and collect the bounties on them. Because there is no formal criminal justice system or police force in the Scrapyard, hunter-warriors function as the primary means of enforcing Factory Law. However, they themselves are still subject to Factory Law, and can become wanted criminals when they step outside its boundaries.

==== Figure Four ====
Figure Four (フォギア・フォア, Fogia Foa) is a drifter known for his mastery of koppo, a form of martial arts that emphasizes bypassing a cyborg's armor to inflict internal damage. Originally a fisherman from the West Coast, Figure traveled east in order to see Tiphares, staying in the Scrapyard for a year, before signed up as a mercenary guarding Factory Train 12, where he befriended Yolg and became intrigued by Alita. Figure questions Alita's bloodlust and desire for battle only to realize that she cannot choose not to fight and decides to help her in her fight against the Barjack. Figure realizes that Alita likes him when he saves Alita from Knucklehead, and later admits that he loves her. He later returns to his previous life in as a fisherman in his hometown Alhambra. In the ending of the original series, Figure refuses to believe Alita is dead and spends five years searching. He encounters Kiyomi K. in Ketheres and later confronts a senile deranged Desty Nova, who leads them into a cavern where he reunites with the reborn Alita.

Figure Four also appears as a side character in Last Order, travelling with Ido before reuniting with the original Alita in the form of a full-flesh human, while her brain chip-equipped cyborg counterpart travels to Mars to finish her fight with Frau X.

==== Fury ====
Fury (フューリー, Fyūrī) is one of Murdock the Dog Master's cyborg dogs, and appears to be modeled along the lines of a bloodhound. He is the only dog whom a 2 year old Koyomi latches onto as "Doo Fan", what she calls all dogs she comes across after Duke Fang. He is assigned by Murdock to protect Koyomi and Shumira when Zapan wreaks havoc on Bar New Kansas in the Berserker Body, and is thus the only one of the four dogs to escape alive. Fury stays with Koyomi and her father, joining her when she runs away at age 13 to see Kaos by hitching a ride with a caravan. Fury now spends much of his time sleeping, but he still possesses some of his old instincts, as he quickly kills one of Sentinel's bandits who is threatening Koyomi. Fury recognizes Alita when she saves Koyomi from the bandits, even though he has not seen her in 11 years. He accompanies Koyomi when she joins the Barjack, and is with her and the Heng when it fires on Tiphares. Fury realizes that AR-10 is not Alita, and after the Heng is destroyed by the Tipharean superweapon Abaddon, destroys a flock of missile bees unleashed by AR-10 on the survivors. His first attack on AR-10 when she threatens Koyomi fails, but while AR-10 is distracted by asking the GIB to switch her ammunition over to anti-personnel rounds to deal with Buick, Fury is able to grab her around the neck and use his weight to throw her into a pile of molten metal, killing her but also dying in the process.
