= Gunnm: Martian Memory =

1998 video game

- Developer(s): Yukito Products
- Publisher(s): Banpresto
- Composer(s): Sumito Sato
- Platform(s): PlayStation
- Release: JP: August 27, 1998
- Genre(s): Action role-playing game
- Mode(s): Single player

Gunnm: Martian Memory (銃夢 ～火星の記憶～, Ganmu Kasei no Kioku) is a 1998 action role-playing video game for the PlayStation based on the Battle Angel Alita manga series. To date it is the only Battle Angel Alita video game, and the only game developed by Yukito Products.

== Story ==
Gunnm: Martian Memory is an adaptation of the Battle Angel Alita manga, following the protagonist and title character Alita (Gally) from her discovery in the Tiphares dump heap by Daisuke Ido up through and beyond her career as a TUNED agent. The story includes additional elements that creator Yukito Kishiro had conceived when he ended the original manga in 1995, but was unable to implement at the time, which involved Alita going into outer space.

== Gameplay ==
The story is advanced through the completion of story and boss rounds at each level, with cut scenes rendered in real time. The player navigates Alita through 3D environments from a third-person perspective, exploring areas and interacting with NPCs, including other characters who appear in the series. In story mode, the player has the option of entering into Battle Mode by pressing the "Select" button, or avoiding combat by running past enemies. In fights involving multiple opponents, the player fights each in turn.

Two aspects of the Battle Angel Alita world featured in the original story, the hunter-warrior system and Motorball, appear in the game. The former arises in the game as means of earning money. The player can exit story mode at any time and travel to certain areas via the world map to fight and defeat opponents with price tags displayed above their heads. This can then used to purchase weapons and upgrades. For the Motorball matches, Alita races around the track and has to survive a race and deal with other players, facing bosses at the end of the track in more advanced matches.

== Conception and development ==
Kishiro was not satisfied with the ending of the original Battle Angel Alita, which he had been forced to cut short for personal reasons. He conceived the idea of making a Battle Angel Alita role-playing video game in October 1995 in order to tell the "Space Story" that he had not been able to present in the manga after he had finished the first chapter of Ashen Victor. After proposing the idea to his chief editor, it was brought to Banpresto. Following the completion of Ashen Victor, Kishiro worked on the game's story, character design, and packaging. It took him a month to do the cover illustration, which is a variation of another illustration of Gally with a blue background that he did for a magazine illustration. Kishiro initially conceived the game as using 2D graphics, but went along with a proposal to use 3D graphics instead. It was originally planned for release in 1997, but was delayed a year to 1998.

Kishiro eventually decided to take the story that he had developed for Gunnm: Martian Memory and expand it further, using it as the basis for the manga Battle Angel Alita: Last Order and Battle Angel Alita: Mars Chronicle, which continue the story of Battle Angel Alita.

== Notes and references ==
- "Gunm Martian Memory (Import) Review". GameSpot. 1999-02-02.
- "Gunnm: Martian Memory". EX: The Online World of Anime and Manga. 2000. Archived from the original on 2004-06-23.
