= Last Order =

Last Order or Last Orders may refer to:

- Last order, used in the UK instead of Last call (bar term), an announcement made in a pub or bar before serving drinks is stopped
- Battle Angel Alita: Last Order, the follow-up series to the Battle Angel Alita manga
- Last Order: Final Fantasy VII, a 2005 animated feature based on the video game Final Fantasy VII
- Last Order, a character in the A Certain Magical Index series
- Last Orders, a 1996 Booker Prize-winning novel by Graham Swift
  - Last Orders (film), a 2001 film based on Swift's novel
- Last Orders (band), an English folk band founded in 2006
  - Last Orders (album), the 2007 debut album by the band

== See also ==
- 60ml: Last Order, 2014 Indian film about alcoholism
- Final Order (disambiguation)
- Last (disambiguation)
- Order (disambiguation)
