= Hunter-warrior =

The term hunter-warrior may refer to:

- Hunter-warrior (archaeology), a term for semi-aristocratic hunter-gatherers in archaeology
- Hunter-warrior, a term for licensed bounty-hunters in the Battle Angel Alita manga series
