= Final order =

Final order may refer to:

- final order (court action), a court order that concludes a court action
- Final Order (Star Wars), a polity and military force in Star Wars that is the Palpatine partisans and Sith remnants of the fallen Empire, featured in Star Wars: Episode IX: The Rise of Skywalker
- Final Order DC (1953-1955), a law in India that establishes several constituencies: Akbarpur (Assembly constituency), Budhana (Assembly constituency), Kairana (Assembly constituency), Saharanpur (Assembly constituency)

== See also ==
- Last Order (disambiguation)
- Final (disambiguation)
- Order (disambiguation)
