= Battle Angel Alita =

Japanese cyberpunk manga series and its adaptations

- First volume cover

銃夢 (Ganmu)
- Genre: Action; Cyberpunk; Post-apocalyptic
- Manga
- Written by: Yukito Kishiro
- Published by: Shueisha
- English publisher: NA: Viz Media (former); Kodansha USA (current)
- Magazine: Business Jump
- Original run: 1990 – 1995
- Volumes: 9
- Original video animation
- Battle Angel (1993)
- Spin-offs and sequels
- Ashen Victor (1995–1996); Battle Angel Alita: Last Order (2000–2014); Battle Angel Alita: Mars Chronicle (2014–2025); Gunnm: Panzer Kunst Chronicle (2026–present)
- Video game
- Gunnm: Martian Memory (1998)
- Live-action film
- Alita: Battle Angel (2019)
- icon

Battle Angel Alita, known in Japan as Gunnm (銃夢, Ganmu; lit. 'gun dream'), (Note: The kanji 銃 will normally be read as "jū", but here it is read by the English meaning for the kanji, gun.) is a Japanese cyberpunk manga series created by Yukito Kishiro and originally published in Shueisha's Business Jump magazine from 1990 to 1995. The first two of the manga's nine volumes were adapted in 1993 into a two-part anime original video animation titled Battle Angel for North American release by ADV Films and the UK and Australian release by Manga Entertainment. Manga Entertainment also handled English dubbing duties for Battle Angel Alita. A live-action film adaptation released by 20th Century Fox, titled Alita: Battle Angel, premiered on February 14, 2019.

The series is set in the post-apocalyptic future and focuses on Alita ("Gally" in the Japanese version, and several other countries), a female cyborg who has lost all memories and is found in a junkyard by a cybernetics doctor who rebuilds and takes care of her. She discovers that there is one thing she remembers, the legendary cyborg martial art Panzer Kunst, which leads to her becoming a Hunter Warrior, or bounty hunter. The story traces Alita's attempts to rediscover her past and the characters whose lives she impacts on her journey. The manga series continued with Last Order (2000–2014), Mars Chronicle (2014–2025), and Panzer Kunst Chronicle (since 2026).

== Plot ==
Battle Angel Alita tells the story of Alita, an amnesiac female cyborg. Her intact head and chest, in suspended animation, are found by cyber medic expert Daisuke Ido in the local garbage dump. Ido manages to revive her, and finding she has lost her memory, names her Alita after his recently deceased cat. The rebuilt Alita soon discovers that she instinctively remembers the legendary martial art, Panzer Kunst, although she does not recall anything else. Alita uses her Panzer Kunst to first become a bounty hunter, killing cyborg criminals in the Scrapyard, and then as a star player in the brutal gladiator sport of Motorball. While in combat, Alita awakens memories of her earlier life on Mars. She becomes involved with the floating city of Zalem (Tiphares in some older translations) as one of their agents and is sent to hunt down criminals. Foremost is the mad genius Desty Nova, who has a complex, ever-changing relationship with Alita.

The futuristic dystopian world of Battle Angel Alita revolves around the city of Scrapyard (Kuzutetsu in the Japanese and various other versions), which has grown up around a massive scrap heap that rains down from Zalem. Ground dwellers have no access to Zalem and are forced to make a living in the sprawl below. Many are heavily modified by cybernetics to better cope with their hard life.

Zalem exploits the Scrapyard and surrounding farms, paying bounty hunters (called Hunter-Warriors) to hunt criminals and arranging violent sports to keep the population entertained. Massive tubes connect the Scrapyard to Zalem, and the city uses robots for carrying out errands and providing security on the ground. Occasionally, Zalemites (such as Daisuke Ido and Desty Nova) are exiled and sent to the ground. Aside from the robots and exiles, there is little contact between the two cities.

The story takes place in the former United States. According to a map, printed in the eighth volume, Scrapyard/Zalem is near Kansas City, Missouri, and the Necropolis is Colorado Springs, Colorado. Radio KAOS is at Dallas, Texas. Figure's coastal hometown is Alhambra, California. Desty Nova's Granite Inn is built out of a military base—NORAD at Cheyenne Mountain Complex, Colorado.

Battle Angel Alita is eventually revealed to take place in the 26th century. The sequel Battle Angel Alita: Last Order introduces a calendar era called "Era Sputnik" which has an epoch of AD 1957. The original Battle Angel Alita series begins in ES 577 (AD 2533) and ends in ES 590 (AD 2546), Battle Angel Alita: Last Order is mostly set roughly in ES 591 (AD 2547), and Battle Angel Alita: Mars Chronicle alternates between ES 373–374 (AD 2329–2330) and ES 594 (AD 2550).

== Characters ==
Battle Angel Alita features a diverse cast of characters, many of whom shift in and out of focus as the story progresses. Some are never to be seen again following the conclusion of a story arc, while others make recurring appearances. The one character who remains a constant throughout is Alita, the protagonist and title character, a young cyborg with amnesia struggling to uncover her forgotten past through the only thing she remembers from it: by fighting. Early on in the story, Daisuke Ido, a bounty-hunting cybernetic doctor who finds and revives Alita, plays a major role as well, but midway the focus begins to increasingly shift to Desty Nova, an eccentric nanotechnology scientist who has fled from Zalem. Desty Nova is the mastermind behind many of the enemies and trials that Alita faces, but does not make an actual appearance until more than two years into the story, although he is alluded to early on. Finally, Kaos, Desty Nova's son, a frail and troubled radio DJ with psychometric powers, also begins to play a crucial role after he comes in contact with Alita. He broadcasts his popular radio show from the wastelands outside the Scrapyard, staying away from the increasing conflict between Zalem and the rebel army Barjack.

== Production ==
Alita was originally a female cyborg police officer named Gally in an unpublished comic called Rainmaker. Publishers at Shueisha liked her and asked Kishiro to make a new story with her as the main character. After he had come up with the plot for a storyline he was commissioned to make it a long-running series.

Besides renaming Gally to Alita, older North American versions of the manga also changed the city of Zalem (from Biblical Hebrew שָׁלֵם šālēm, "peace") to Tiphares (after Tiferet). Since Kishiro also used the name Jeru (after Jerusalem) for the facility atop Zalem, Jeru was renamed Ketheres in the translation (after Keter). More recent versions reverted the cities' names back to Zalem and Jeru. To further develop the Biblical theme in the original series, Zalem's main computer was named Melchizedek, "the king of Salem" and "priest to the Most High God".

== Media ==
=== Manga ===
The manga was first published in Shueisha's Business Jump magazine. It was then serialized from 1990 to 1995 in nine tankōbon. Yukito Kishiro moved from Shueisha to Kodansha in August 2010. The company acquired the license rights to Battle Angel Alita. A six-volume special edition titled Gunnm: Complete Edition was released in Japan from December 18, 1998, to August 18, 2000. The series was released in B5 format and contains the original story, but without the original ending, which was retconned later in 2000 by Battle Angel Alita: Last Order. Also included are rough sketches, a timeline and the first three Battle Angel Alita: Holy Night & Other Stories short stories. From October 5 to November 16, 2016, Kodansha republished Gunnm in three volumes in B5 format. It was later reprinted in A5 format in five volumes from November 21, 2018, to February 22, 2019.

A spin-off series titled Ashen Victor (灰者, Haisha) was published in Ultra Jump from September 1995 to July 1996 issues. It was released in a single volume on June 24, 1998.

A spin-off series titled Battle Angel Alita: Holy Night & Other Stories (銃夢外伝, Ganmu Gaiden) was published in Ultra Jump from January 24, 1997, to December 19, 2006. It was released in a single volume on December 19, 2007. It is composed of four short side stories: "Holy Night", "Sonic Finger", "Hometown" and "Barjack Rhapsody".

In North America, Viz Media originally released the story in a 25-page comic book, after which it followed the same volume format as its Japanese counterpart. Viz also released the Ashen Victor spin-off series. Along with the rest of the series, Kishiro's original Battle Angel Alita manga has been licensed for North American publication through Kodansha USA, who republished it the five-volume omnibus format in 2017 and 2018, with the last volume including Ashen Victor. Holy Night & Other Stories has also been licensed by Kodansha USA, who published it digitally on October 30, 2018, and as hardcover on November 20. Battle Angel Alita has also been licensed for international release in a number of languages and regions. It was published in Spain by Planeta DeAgostini, in Brazil by Editora JBC, in France and Netherlands by Glenat, in Poland by JPF, in Germany by Carlsen, in Taiwan by Tong Li Publishing, in Argentina by Editorial Ivrea and in Russia by Xl Media.

=== OVA ===
A two-episode original video animation (OVA) was released in 1993, incorporating elements from the first two volumes of the manga with changes to the characters and storyline. According to Kishiro, only two episodes were originally planned. At the time, he was too busy with the manga "to review the plan coolly" and was not serious about an anime adaptation. It remains the only anime adaptation of Battle Angel Alita to date and there are no plans to revive it.

Alita as depicted in the 2000 CG movie clip

A three-minute 3D-CGI rendered movie clip is included in volume six of the Japanese Gunnm: Complete Edition (1998–2000). It showcases Alita in a Third League Motorball race with players from two of her races such as "Armor" Togo, Degchalev, and Valdicci, and depicts events from both of those races.

=== Film ===
In 2010, 20th Century Fox and director James Cameron acquired the film rights to Battle Angel. It was originally brought to Cameron's attention by filmmaker Guillermo del Toro. Cameron is said to be a big fan of the manga, and he was waiting until CGI technology was sufficiently advanced to make a live-action 3D film with effects comparable to Avatar. The film would be a live-action adaptation of the first four volumes of the manga series; "What I'm going to do is take the spine story and use elements from the first four books. So, the Motorball from books three and four, and parts of the story of one and two will all be in the movie."

Alita was originally scheduled to be his next production after the TV series Dark Angel, which was influenced by Battle Angel Alita. After Avatar, he stated he would work on Avatar sequels before starting Alita.

Cameron's producer Jon Landau said, "I am sure you will get to see Battle Angel. It is one of my favourite stories, a great story about a young woman's journey to self-discovery. It is a film that asks the question: What does it mean to be human? Are you human if you have a heart, a brain or a soul? I look forward to giving the audience the film." Landau half-jokingly stated that the project may be titled Alita: The Battle Angel, because of Cameron's tradition in naming his films with either an "A" or a "T".

In October 2015, it was reported that Robert Rodriguez would direct the film with Cameron and Landau producing. On April 26, 2016, both The Hollywood Reporter and Variety reported that Maika Monroe, Rosa Salazar, Zendaya and Bella Thorne were in the running for the lead role. Near the end of May 2016, Salazar was cast as Alita, and on February 7, 2017, The Hollywood Reporter reported that Jennifer Connelly would be joining the cast as one of the villains.

On December 8, 2017, the first trailer for Battle Angel was released to the public, and the film, titled Alita: Battle Angel and directed by Robert Rodriguez, premiered on February 14, 2019.

=== Novels ===
A novelization of the manga by Yasuhisa Kawamura was released on April 4, 1997, by Shueisha's JUMP j-BOOKS label.

In November 2018, Titan Books published Alita: Battle Angel—Iron City, a prequel novel for the film. The novel was written by Pat Cadigan, a notable science fiction author.

=== Video game ===
Gunnm: Martian Memory is an action RPG video game for the PlayStation by Banpresto. It is an adaptation of the manga, following Alita (Gally) from her discovery in the Zalem dump heap by Daisuke Ido up through and beyond her career as a TUNED agent. The story includes additional elements that Kishiro had conceived when he ended the original manga in 1995, but was unable to implement at the time, which involved Alita going into outer space. He then expanded the story, which formed the basis for the manga Battle Angel Alita: Last Order.

=== Related works ===
- Ashen Victor, a story set six years before the beginning of Battle Angel Alita, published in Ultra Jump. It primarily tells the story of a Motorball player and it sets the evolution of the game into what it becomes in the Battle Angel Alita series.
- Last Order, a continuation of Battle Angel Alita, published monthly in Ultra Jump and later in Evening.
- Mars Chronicle, a continuation of Last Order, published in Evening and later in Comic Days.
- Panzer Kunst Chronicle, a continuation to Mars Chronicle, published in Comic Days.

== Reception ==
Yukito Kishiro's fantasy world garnered widespread acclaim from critics. Manga Life reviewer Adam Volk described the universe as intricately crafted and deeply engaging, noting that the first volume alone demonstrated Kishiro's mastery of the genre. He highlighted the manga's balance of dynamic action and well-developed, independent characters—a rarity in comics, films, and television—ultimately declaring it a classic tale of life's struggles.

Patrick King of Animefringe lauded the grandeur of Kishiro's creation, portraying it as a vivid, unsettling, and eerily plausible vision of humanity's future. He observed that the manga explored themes of human nature and authenticity, distinguishing it from Kishiro's more fantastical Aqua Knight with its grounded realism. While acknowledging the series' graphic violence as unsuitable for younger audiences, King argued that it reinforced the protagonist's motivations.

Raphael See of THEM Anime Reviews regarded it as one of the finest cyborg-themed anime, praising its seamless integration of cybernetics into the worldbuilding without overshadowing the narrative. While he found the series lacking in innovation, its consistent quality left a strong impression. His sole criticism was its abrupt ending, which suggested a broader, unexplored storyline.

Theron Martin of Anime News Network commended Kishiro's meticulous worldbuilding and enduring artistic prowess, emphasizing the clarity of the action sequences. JapanVisitor.com noted the influence of Philip K. Dick (Do Androids Dream of Electric Sheep?) and Isaac Asimov (I, Robot) on Kishiro's work.

== See also ==
- Aelita, also known as Aelita, or The Decline of Mars
- Armitage III
- Genocyber

== Bibliography ==
- Cholodenko, Alan, ed. (2007). The Illusion of Life II: More Essays on Animation. Sydney: Power Publications. ISBN 9780909952341.
