= Alita: Battle Angel =

2019 film by Robert Rodriguez

- Theatrical release poster
- Directed by: Robert Rodriguez
- Screenplay by: James Cameron; Laeta Kalogridis
- Based on: Gunnm by Yukito Kishiro
- Produced by: James Cameron; Jon Landau
- Starring: Rosa Salazar; Christoph Waltz; Jennifer Connelly; Mahershala Ali; Ed Skrein; Jackie Earle Haley; Keean Johnson
- Cinematography: Bill Pope
- Edited by: Stephen E. Rivkin; Ian Silverstein
- Music by: Tom Holkenborg
- Production companies: 20th Century Fox; Lightstorm Entertainment; Troublemaker Studios
- Distributed by: 20th Century Fox
- Release dates: January 31, 2019 (Odeon Leicester Square, London); February 14, 2019 (United States)
- Running time: 122 minutes
- Country: United States
- Language: English
- Budget: $150–200 million
- Box office: $405 million

Alita: Battle Angel is a 2019 American cyberpunk action film based on Yukito Kishiro's science fiction manga series Gunnm and its 1993 original video animation adaptation, directed by Robert Rodriguez, produced by James Cameron and Jon Landau, and written by Cameron and Laeta Kalogridis. Using motion-capture and CGI animation, Rosa Salazar stars as Alita, a cyborg who awakens in a new body without memory of her past and sets out to uncover her destiny. Many of the supporting roles are played by live actors, including Christoph Waltz, Jennifer Connelly, Mahershala Ali, Ed Skrein, Jackie Earle Haley and Keean Johnson.

Announced in 2003, production was repeatedly delayed due to Cameron's work on Avatar (2009) and its sequels. After years of development hell, Rodriguez was announced as Alita's director in April 2016, with Salazar cast as the lead the following month. Principal photography began in October 2016 in Austin, Texas, mostly at Rodriguez's Troublemaker Studios, and lasted until February 2017.

Alita: Battle Angel had its world premiere at the Odeon Leicester Square in London on January 31, 2019, and was released in the United States on February 14, by 20th Century Fox. The film grossed $405 million, making it Rodriguez's highest-grossing film, and received mixed reviews from critics. In the years since its release, the film has garnered a cult following. A sequel is in development.

== Plot ==
In the year 2563, 300 years after Earth was devastated in a catastrophic war against the United Republic of Mars (URM), scientist Dr. Dyson Ido salvages a disembodied female cyborg with an intact human brain in the Iron City scrapyard. He unites it with a new cyborg body and names her "Alita" after his late daughter. Alita wakes with no memory and befriends Hugo, who dreams of moving to the wealthy sky city Zalem. She also meets Dr. Chiren, Ido's ex-wife. Hugo introduces Alita to Motorball, a Rollerball-like sport played by cyborg gladiators. Hugo secretly robs cyborgs of their parts for Vector, owner of the Motorball tournament and de facto ruler of the Factory, Iron City's governing authority.

One night, Alita follows Ido. They are ambushed by killer cyborgs led by Grewishka. Ido is injured and Alita instinctively fights using "Panzer-Kunst", a lost combat art for machine bodies. She kills two cyborgs and damages Grewishka who retreats. Ido reveals that he is a Hunter-Warrior, a bounty-hunter hired by the Factory. Grewishka seeks help from Dr. Chiren, who is working for Vector. Alita believes fighting will help her rediscover her past but Ido discourages her from becoming a Hunter-Warrior. Alita finds an advanced cyborg body of a Berserker, shock troops of the enemy URM, of which Alita realizes she was a member. Ido refuses to install Alita in it, which upsets her.

Alita registers as a Hunter-Warrior. At the Kansas Bar, she and Hugo attempt to recruit other Hunter-Warriors to help take down Grewishka. Hunter-Warrior Zapan provokes Alita and she beats him in a fight, triggering a bar brawl until Ido arrives. An upgraded Grewishka appears and challenges Alita to a duel, having been sent by Zalem's overlord, Nova, to destroy her. Alita's body is damaged by Grewishka before Ido, Hugo, and Hunter-Warrior dogmaster McTeague force Grewishka to retreat. Ido apologizes and transplants Alita into the Berserker body.

Having fallen in love with Hugo, Alita enters a Motorball tryout for the prize money to send Hugo to Zalem. Hugo decides to quit his criminal job. He confronts his partner Tanji, but Zapan appears, kills Tanji and frames Hugo for the murder. Hugo escapes and calls Alita for help. She abandons the race and finds him just as Zapan mortally wounds Hugo. Dr. Chiren saves Hugo by attaching his severed head to Alita's life support system. When Zapan attempts to stop Alita, she seizes his Damascus blade and cuts off his face.

Ido transplants Hugo's head onto a cyborg body and tells Alita that Vector's offer to help Hugo reach Zalem was a lie, and that citizens of Iron City can only enter Zalem by becoming a Motorball champion. Alita confronts Vector, who reveals that Chiren has been harvested for her organs. Vector summons Grewishka whom Alita easily destroys with her real original body. Nova speaks to her through Vector. When Nova threatens to harm her friends, Alita fatally impales Vector.

Ido contacts Alita to tell her that Hugo is climbing a cargo tube towards Zalem. Alita catches up to him and pleads with him to return with her. He agrees, but a serrated defense ring dropped by Nova shreds his body and throws him off the tube. Alita catches him but cannot pull him up. He thanks her for saving him, then falls.

Months later, Alita is a rising star in Motorball. She swears revenge, pointing her sword toward Zalem where a smirking Nova watches.

== Cast ==
- Rosa Salazar as Alita, a revived cyborg suffering from amnesia.
- Christoph Waltz as Dr. Dyson Ido, a renowned cyborg scientist, part-time bounty-hunter and Alita's father figure
- Jennifer Connelly as Dr. Chiren, Ido's estranged former wife, a masterful cyborg engineer who works for Vector
- Mahershala Ali as Vector, an influential entrepreneur at the Factory with criminal connections who also serves as Nova's proxy
- Ed Skrein as Zapan, an arrogant sword-wielding bounty-hunting cyborg, who embarks on an egotistic vendetta against Alita
- Jackie Earle Haley as Grewishka, a huge criminal cyborg who works for Nova as his personal assassin and enforcer.
- Keean Johnson as Hugo, Alita's love interest and a morally conflicted scrap dealer.
- Jorge Lendeborg Jr. as Tanji, Hugo's scrap-dealing friend and accomplice in crime, who is more underhanded and does not share Hugo's ethics.
- Lana Condor as Koyomi, a teenager who is friends with Hugo and Tanji.
- Idara Victor as Nurse Gerhad, Ido's assistant.
- Jeff Fahey as McTeague, a Hunter-Warrior who leads a pack of cyborg dogs.
- Eiza González as Nyssiana, a wanted criminal cyborg assassin and one of Grewishka's subordinates.
- Derek Mears as Romo, a wanted criminal cyborg assassin and one of Grewishka's subordinates.
- Leonard Wu as Kinuba, a top league Motorball player whose limbs were cut off by Hugo's jacking gang.
- Rick Yune as Master Clive Lee, a Hunter-Warrior who claims a record of 207 kills.
- Casper Van Dien as Amok, a cyborg who is responsible for the death of Ido's daughter.
- Elle LaMont as Screwhead, a cyborg who is referred to as being one of the most lethal Hunter-Warriors hired by the Factory.

Appearing in uncredited cameo appearances are Michelle Rodriguez as Alita's cyborg mentor Gelda, Jai Courtney as Motorball champion Jashugan, and Edward Norton as Nova. Even Elizabeth Tabish (Mary of Magdala in The Chosen) appears in an uncredited cameo appearance as a waitress.

== Production ==
=== Development ===
Battle Angel Alita—an early-1990s Japanese cyberpunk manga series titled Gunnm in Japan and written by Yukito Kishiro—was originally brought to James Cameron's attention by Guillermo del Toro, and Cameron immediately became enamored with the concept. The domain name "battleangelalita.com" was registered to Cameron by 20th Century Fox around June 2000. Fox also registered the "battleangelmovie.com" domain. In April 2003, it was reported by Moviehole that Cameron had confirmed he would direct a Battle Angel film. Cameron confirmed that a script for the film was in production during an interview on the Tokudane! program on Fuji TV on May 4, 2003. It was originally scheduled to be his next production after the TV series Dark Angel, which was influenced by Battle Angel Alita. It was later scheduled to be his next film after Aliens of the Deep in January 2005.

In June 2005, The Hollywood Reporter claimed that the film was being delayed while Cameron developed a film known as Project 880, which would later be renamed Avatar. Entertainment Weekly ran an interview in February 2006 in which Cameron stated that his deal with 20th Century Fox was that he produce both films. The article also claimed that Battle Angel was slated to be released in September 2009. In June 2006, Cameron commented that Battle Angel was the second of two planned film trilogies he was developing, with the first being Avatar. In May 2008, Cameron indicated he would be working on a film titled The Dive, a biography of freedivers Francisco Ferreras and Audrey Mestre, thus delaying the film again. That July, at San Diego Comic-Con, he reiterated that he was still committed to making the film. In December 2009, Cameron commented during an interview with MTV News that a script for Battle Angel had been completed.

In February 2010, producer Jon Landau commented that he was trying to convince Cameron to change the title from the manga to Alita: Battle Angel for the film. Cameron later explained the reason for rearranging the film title from the initial source material, was to allow the possibilities of sequel titles, "It's Alita, colon, Battle Angel. Because the next one will be "Alita: Fallen Angel" and then Alita...you know "Avenging Angel" and then Alita whatever. I mean, that's assuming we make some money." Landau also revealed that screenwriter Laeta Kalogridis had worked on writing the film. In August 2010, Cameron stated that the film was "still on [his] radar", but he did not know when he would make it. However, that October, he confirmed that his next films would be two Avatar sequels instead of Battle Angel. He still stated that he did not intend to abandon the film, stating that he loved the project too much to hand it off to another director, but reiterated in June 2011 that it would not be produced until the two Avatar sequels were completed, stating that "Battle Angel is not going to happen for a few years." According to Cameron, his reason for producing Avatar first is because he believes that the film can raise public awareness of the need for environmental protection.

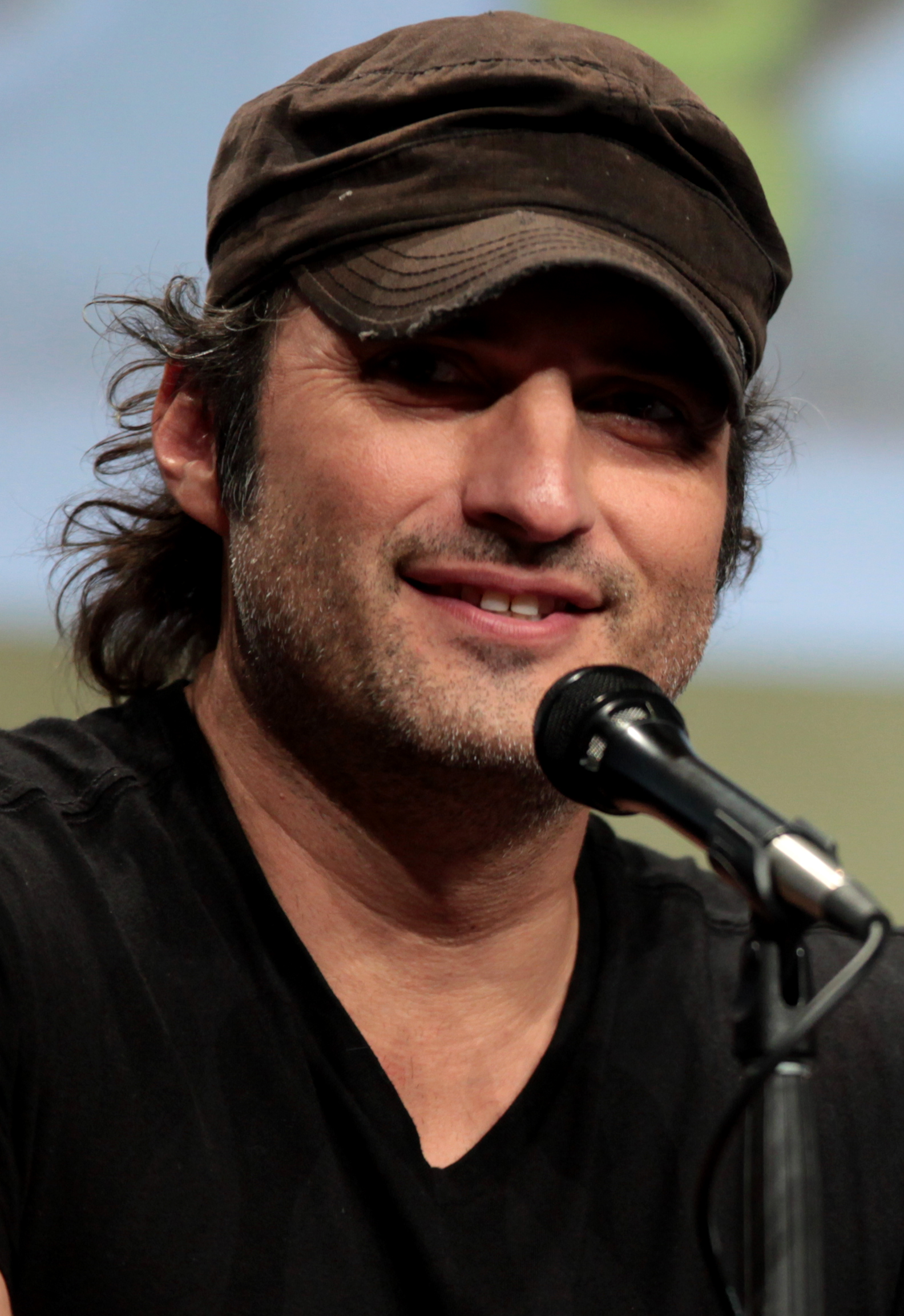
Robert Rodriguez, the director of the film.

During an interview with Alfonso Cuarón in July 2013, Cameron set 2017 as the date at which production on the film would begin. In October 2015, The Hollywood Reporter reported that director Robert Rodriguez was in negotiations to direct the film, now titled Alita: Battle Angel, and Cameron would be attached as producer alongside Jon Landau. Rodriguez had been brought in by Cameron to condense and combine Cameron's 186-page screenplay and some 600 pages of notes into what could be the shooting script. Satisfied by Rodriguez's work on the shooting script, Cameron offered him the directing job. In April 2016, The Hollywood Reporter reported that 20th Century Fox had not yet greenlit the film, as they were attempting to reduce the budget to something below $175–$200 million. The article also announced that Rodriguez had been signed as director. In late May 2016, Fox scheduled the film for a July 20, 2018, release date.

=== Pre-production ===
With James Cameron as potential director, the film was to be produced with the same mix of live-action and computer-generated imagery that Cameron used in Avatar. Specifically, Cameron intended to render the main character, Alita, completely in CGI. Cameron had stated that he would make use of technologies developed for Avatar to produce the film, such as the Fusion Camera System, Facial motion capture, and the Simulcam. In May 2006, Variety reported that Cameron had spent the past ten months developing technology to produce the film.

In October 2018, Mark Goerner, a digital artist who had worked on the film for a year and a half, commented that pre-production work on the film was mostly finished. In a February 2019 interview, Cameron revealed that he set the floating city of Zalem in Panama, specifically Panama City. He explained that the city Zalem is not floating, but hanging from a space elevator, which would only work physically near the equator. As a result of the new location, Iron City was designed with Spanish signage and Latin American architecture.

=== Casting ===
An April 2016 article in The Hollywood Reporter reported that Maika Monroe, Rosa Salazar, and Zendaya were among the final actresses being considered to take the role of Alita in the film, with a decision due within a few weeks. The article reported that Zendaya's former Shake It Up co-star Bella Thorne had also auditioned for the role. Near the end of May 2016, Collider reported that Salazar had been chosen. In August 2016, it was reported that Christoph Waltz was in negotiations to play Dr. Dyson Ido, the equivalent of Daisuke Ido from the original manga. On September 14, 2016, it was announced that Jackie Earle Haley had been cast as a cyborg villain. On September 21, 2016, Variety reported that Ed Skrein was in talks for a role in the film; The Hollywood Reporter later confirmed that he had been cast as the antagonist Zapan.

On September 30, 2016, Keean Johnson was reported to have been cast in the film to play Hugo, Alita's love interest, who later becomes the reason for her to play a gladiator-style game called Motorball. The studio also considered Avan Jogia, Douglas Booth, Jack Lowden, and Noah Silver for the role, but decided on Johnson because they were looking for someone more "ethnically ambiguous." On October 3, 2016, Mahershala Ali was reportedly in talks for the villainous role of Vector, a man who rigs Motorball combat matches. In an interview following his Best Supporting Actor win at the 89th Academy Awards, Ali revealed that he would play two roles in the film, although he did not elaborate on the nature of the second role.

On October 5, 2016, it was reported that Eiza González had joined the film. González is one of the leads in Rodriguez's television series From Dusk till Dawn: The Series. Jorge Lendeborg Jr. was announced for a role in the film on October 7, 2016. He would play Hugo's friend. Lana Condor was reported to have joined the cast on October 11, 2016, portraying the orphaned teen Koyomi. On October 18, 2016, Leonard Wu was cast as the cyborg Kinuba. Marko Zaror joined the cast as the cyborg Ajakutty in December 2016. On February 7, 2017, Jennifer Connelly joined the film in an unknown villainous role. Michelle Rodriguez was retroactively announced for a role on February 22, 2017, after the film had completed shooting.

=== Filming ===
The film began shooting at Robert Rodriguez's Troublemaker Studios in Austin, Texas on October 17, 2016, and concluded on February 9, 2017. In late January 2017, a casting call went out looking for rocker, punk, or emo extras to film scenes in Austin on the nights of February 3, 6 and 7, 2017.

Salazar went through "five months of exhaustive martial arts training" to prepare for the action sequences in the film, learning Eagle Claw Kung Fu, Muay Thai, and staff work. James Cameron also decided that the film would pay homage to Bruce Lee, seen through Alita's punching technique during a scene where she practises in front of a mirror.

=== Visual effects ===
The visual effects were provided by Weta Digital, DNEG and Framestore and supervised by Joe Letteri, Eric Saindon, Nick Epstein, Raymond Chen and Nigel Denton-Howes. Weta Digital was the main visual effect company for the Alita digital puppet, which required the company to redesign its motion capture methods to motion capture all the subtleties and complexities of Salazar's performance.

== Music ==
On December 17, 2018, it was announced that English-Albanian singer Dua Lipa would have a song featured on the film's soundtrack titled "Swan Song". The song and official music video were released on January 24, 2019, with the official music video directed by Floria Sigismondi. Tom Holkenborg composed the score for the film as well as the song "Swan Song" as a co-writer. The soundtrack album for the film was released digitally on February 14, 2019, by Milan Records, with a physical release, the following day.

== Marketing ==
The teaser trailer for the film was released on December 8, 2017, with a July 2018 release in mind. The footage received a mixed response, with a majority of the commentary focusing on the appearance of the titular character, Alita. Andrew Liptak of The Verge stated that "The character looks like an anime doll come to life, or like a Disney character that's just a hair off from normal. It's probably a deliberate choice, meant to remind viewers at every moment that Alita isn't human. But after so many years of CGI animators trying to mimic convincing human faces and not entirely succeeding, it's still unsettling to see a character hovering this close to realistic, while staying this far away from it." Adam Chitwood of Collider was intrigued and cautiously optimistic, saying, "This thing looks bonkers, and now it's crystal clear why Cameron was considering directing this in the first place. The choice to make your protagonist a photo-real CGI creation interacting with actual human characters is mighty ambitious, and I can say with certainty this doesn't look like anything Robert Rodriguez has done before. I don't know if it'll be good, but it definitely seems like it'll at least be interesting."

The first trailer was shown at SDCC 2018 and made its way online on July 23, 2018, with a December 2018 release in mind. The trailer featured a cover of Linkin Park's "New Divide", covered by composer J2 featuring vocalist Avery. The third trailer was released in November 2018, almost a year after the first trailer was launched.

A tie-in novel was released on November 20, 2018, written by sci-fi author Pat Cadigan. Entitled Iron City, the novel's story acted as a prequel focused on some of the residents living in Iron City before the events of the film. An audiobook adaptation of the novel was also released on the same date, narrated by Brian Nishii. Alongside the release of the film, another novel titled Dr. Ido's Journal by Nick Aires was published on February 19, 2019. Three hundred limited-edition copies of The Art and Making of the Movie by Abbie Bernstein were signed by Robert Rodriguez. The official novelization of the film was released on the same date, written by Pat Cadigan.

In January 2019, Cameron and 20th Century Fox collaborated with Open Bionics to give 13-year-old double amputee Tilly Lockey a pair of Alita-inspired bionic Hero Arms for the film's London premiere. In February 2019, 20th Century Fox collaborated with Iam8bit to create "Passport to Iron City", a recreation of the film's setting for fans to tour. "Passport to Iron City" is available in New York City, Los Angeles, and Austin.

== Release ==
=== Theatrical ===
The film held its world premiere on January 31, 2019, at the Odeon Leicester Square in London, and was released by 20th Century Fox in the United States on February 14, 2019. It was originally set to be released on July 20, 2018, but in February 2018, the film was delayed to December 21 before later being pushed back again in late September to its final release date, with a PG-13 cut of Deadpool 2 taking its place.

On January 28, 2019, Cameron announced that the film would hold free one-day previews in the United States on January 31, 2019, before the general release. It was also released in Hong Kong, Indonesia, Macau, Malaysia, Singapore, South Korea, and Taiwan on February 5, 2019, marking Chinese New Year. the Philippines on February 6, India on February 8, and Japan and Mainland China on February 22. It is also notable for being the final film from Fox to be released as a stand alone studio, as a month later on March 20, 2019, the studio was acquired by The Walt Disney Company and would distribute future films under them starting with the release of Breakthrough.

=== Lawsuit ===
On January 30, 2019, Epic Stone Group, a Florida-based multimedia company, sued 20th Century Fox for trademark infringement over the "Battle Angel" name. The lawsuit claims that Epic Stone Group had filed the trademark for "Battle Angel" in 2009 for computer games, action figures and other merchandise, and it had filed a new application in April 2018 to use the name on DVDs, e-books, films and television programs. On May 30, 2019, Epic Stone Group filed to dismiss their trademark infringement suit against 20th Century Fox.

=== Home media ===
Alita: Battle Angel was released by 20th Century Fox Home Entertainment on digital platforms on July 9, 2019, with Blu-ray, 4K Ultra HD and DVD releases following on July 23. The 4K version was Fox's first 4K release to utilize Dolby Vision (alongside rival format HDR10+ on the same disc; Fox had already released films in that format and was a backer) and includes a bonus 3D version of the film on a separate disc.

It was a hit on home video, topping the Blu-ray charts for two weeks in a row, as of August 2019. As of December 2019, it has grossed at least $50 million in home video sales.

== Reception ==
=== Box office ===
Alita: Battle Angel grossed $85.8 million in the United States and Canada, and $319.1 million in other countries, for a worldwide total of $405 million, against a production budget of $170 million. It is Robert Rodriguez's highest-grossing film. Estimates vary for the total worldwide gross the film needed in order to break even, with Fox insiders stating $350 million but outside financial publications pegging the amount at $400–500 million. Some contend the film broke even by the end of its theatrical run, others listed its losses as high as $53 million.

==== North America ====
In the United States and Canada, the film was initially projected to gross $18–22 million in its opening weekend, and around $25 million from 3,790 theaters over its first four days. After making $8.7 million on its first day (including $2.4 million from Wednesday night previews), five-day projections were increased to $36–40 million. It then made $7.5 million on its second day of release and went on to debut to $28.5 million in the weekend, finishing first at the box office. It also had a four-day gross of $37.2 million and five-day total of $42.5 million. Opening weekend audiences consisted of 60% male and 40% female, with demographics including 44% White, 21% Hispanic, 15% Asian American and 14% African American. The film dropped 58% in its second weekend, making $12 million and finishing second behind newcomer How to Train Your Dragon: The Hidden World, and then made $7 million in its third, finishing third.

==== Other territories ====
Alita opened a week early in 11 international markets (including ten Asian countries as well as the United Kingdom), where it grossed $32 million in its opening weekend. It opened at number two in South Korea with $10.9 million, first in Taiwan with $4.2 million (where it was Fox's fourth-biggest opening ever), $4.2 million in the United Kingdom (with a 42% being from 3D shows), and $2.9 million in Malaysia (where it was Fox's second-biggest opening ever). In its second international weekend, the film grossed $56.2 million from 86 markets, bringing its international gross to $94.4 million. It was the weekend's second-highest-grossing film with $84 million worldwide, behind the Chinese film The Wandering Earth.

In China, Alita earned $1 million from early midnight previews prior to release. It had a China opening-day gross of $20 million on February 22, 2019, surpassing expectations, with its opening-weekend projection increasing from $50 million to over $60 million. The film's daily gross increased to $24.8 million on its second day, for a two-day gross of $44.55 million in China. The film had an opening weekend gross of $65 million in China, making it Fox's biggest opening of all time in the country. It also set a new February IMAX record, with $9 million (14%) from 603 IMAX screens in China. Chinese opening weekend audiences consisted of 54% male and 46% female. In Japan, the film launched with $3.2 million in its opening weekend. In its third international weekend, it topped the international box office with $92.5 million in 82 markets. The film also topped the worldwide box office that weekend with $104.4 million.

=== Critical response ===
On the review aggregator website Rotten Tomatoes, Alita: Battle Angel holds an approval rating of 61% based on 331 reviews, with an average rating of 6.1/10. The website's critical consensus reads, "Alita: Battle Angel's story struggles to keep up with its special effects, but fans of futuristic sci-fi action may still find themselves more than sufficiently entertained." On Metacritic, the film has a weighted average score of 53 out of 100, based on 49 critics, indicating "mixed or average" reviews. Audiences polled by CinemaScore gave the film an average grade of "A−" on an A+ to F scale, while those at PostTrak gave it an overall positive score of 78% and a 59% "definite recommend".

Michael Nordine of IndieWire gave the film a grade of "B+", saying, "Alita: Battle Angel is [Rodriguez's] best film since he brought Frank Miller's graphic novel to the screen, a sci-fi epic that does something rare in an age of endless adaptations and reboots: lives up to its potential while leaving you wanting more." Writing for Variety, Guy Lodge praised Rodriguez's effort but called the film "muddled" and wrote: "This manga-based cyberpunk origin story is a pretty zappy effects showcase, weighed down by a protracted, soul-challenged Frankenstory that short-circuits every time it gets moving."

Monica Castillo from RogerEbert.com wrote that the "visual bonanza cooked up by Rodriguez, cinematographer Bill Pope and editors Stephen E. Rivkin and Ian Silverstein is enough to power through any narrative bumps with quickly paced action and bleak, yet colorful, imagery" and gave the film 2.5 out of 4. Emily Yoshida of New York magazine was critical of the film but ultimately found it charming, and praised Salazar's performance: "The only reason any of this works at all is Salazar and, I hate to say it, those goddamned big eyes. They're the windows to the soul, after all, and this ungainly, lurching cyborg of a would-be blockbuster has more of that than meets the eye." Jeffrey Anderson of Common Sense Media gave the film 2 out of 5 stars, and noted that "This juggernaut-sized sci-fi movie mechanically rehashes a huge collection of genre clichés while bashing its way through an onslaught of visual effects, bad dialogue, and dull, lifeless characters. Co-written by James Cameron and directed by Robert Rodriguez, Alita: Battle Angel feels lost in a bubble; it's clueless about the real world, about real emotions, or about any other, grindingly similar movies that have come out in the real world."

Kishiro praised the movie adaptation, claiming it to be "the greatest movie in the world". He added, "Every time I see, I can find something new. The composition is amazing. All scenes are special and there are no unneeded ones. It is so exciting that I can't believe that I created the original story. The core part of the manga was brilliantly passed on to the film. Including the characters' emotion and raison d'être, they were perfectly reflected in the film, so I was very happy."

=== Accolades ===
In addition to the numerous awards and nominations, Alita: Battle Angel was submitted for consideration in the Best Visual Effects category at the 92nd Academy Awards, but failed to get shortlisted.

Award	Date of ceremony	Category	Recipient(s)	Result	Ref.
Annie Awards	January 25, 2020	Outstanding Achievement for Character Animation in a Live Action Production	Michael Cozens	Nominated	
Austin Film Critics Association	January 7, 2020	Best Motion Capture/Special Effects Performance	Rosa Salazar	Nominated	
Dragon Awards	August 7, 2019	Best Science Fiction or Fantasy Movie	Alita: Battle Angel	Nominated	
Florida Film Critics Circle	December 23, 2019	Best Visual Effects	Alita: Battle Angel	Won	
Golden Schmoes Awards	February 8, 2020	Most Underrated Movie of the Year	Alita: Battle Angel	Won	
Golden Schmoes Awards	February 8, 2020	Best Sci-Fi Movie of the Year	Alita: Battle Angel	Nominated	
Golden Schmoes Awards	February 8, 2020	Best Special Effects of the Year	Alita: Battle Angel	Nominated	
Hollywood Critics Association	January 10, 2020	Best Visual Effects or Animated Performance	Rosa Salazar	Won	
Hollywood Critics Association	January 10, 2020	Best Visual Effects	Joe Letteri, Eric Saindon and Nick Epstein	Nominated	
Hollywood Professional Association	November 21, 2019	Outstanding Visual Effects – Theatrical Feature	Eric Saindon, Michael Cozens, Dejan Momcilovic, Mark Haenga, Kevin Sherwood	Nominated	
Hollywood Music In Media Awards	November 20, 2019	Best Original Score in a Sci-Fi/Fantasy Film	Tom Holkenborg	Nominated	
Imagen Awards	August 12, 2019	Best Actress – Feature Film	Rosa Salazar	Nominated	
ReFrame Stamp	February 26, 2020	Top 100-Grossing Narrative Feature	20th Century Fox	Won	
Satellite Awards	December 19, 2019	Best Animated or Mixed Media Film	Alita: Battle Angel	Nominated	
Satellite Awards	December 19, 2019	Best Visual Effects	Joe Letteri and Eric Saindon	Won	
Satellite Awards	December 19, 2019	Best Original Song	"Swan Song" – Tom Holkenborg, Dua Lipa	Nominated	
Saturn Awards	September 13, 2019	Best Science Fiction Film	Alita: Battle Angel	Nominated	
Seattle Film Critics Society	December 16, 2019	Best Visual Effects	Joe Letteri, Eric Saindon and Nick Epstein	Nominated	
St. Louis Film Critics Association	December 15, 2019	Best Action Film	Alita: Battle Angel	Nominated	
St. Louis Film Critics Association	December 15, 2019	Best Visual Effects	Alita: Battle Angel	Nominated	
Visual Effects Society Awards	January 29, 2020	Outstanding Visual Effects in a Photoreal Feature	Richard Hollander, Kevin Sherwood, Eric Saindon, Richard Baneham and Bob Trevino	Nominated	
Visual Effects Society Awards	January 29, 2020	Outstanding Animated Character in a Photoreal Feature	Michael Cozens, Mark Haenga, Olivier Lesaint and Dejan Momcliovic (for "Alita")	Won	
Visual Effects Society Awards	January 29, 2020	Outstanding Created Environment in a Photoreal Feature	John Stevenson-Galvin, Ryan Arcus, Mathias Larserud and Mark Tait (for "Iron City")	Nominated	
Visual Effects Society Awards	January 29, 2020	Outstanding Virtual Cinematography in a CG Project	Emile Ghorayeb; Simon Jung; Nick Epstein; Mike Perry	Nominated	
Visual Effects Society Awards	January 29, 2020	Outstanding Compositing in a Photoreal Feature	Adam Bradley; Carlo Scaduto; Hirofumi Takeda; Ben Roberts	Nominated	
Washington D.C. Area Film Critics Association	December 8, 2019	Best Motion Capture Performance	Rosa Salazar	Nominated	

== Future ==
James Cameron and Robert Rodriguez have hinted that the film could lead to multiple sequels. On February 6, 2019, they announced that they have plans for Alita: Battle Angel 2 in the future. The casting of Edward Norton in a non-speaking role as Nova in this film was intended to be a setup for the sequel. Additionally, the uncredited cameos by Michelle Rodriguez and Jai Courtney were meant to set up larger roles in a sequel.

In April 2020, Christoph Waltz stated that he had not heard any discussions about a potential sequel to the film, and thought the possibility was unlikely following Disney's acquisition of 20th Century Fox as it may not fit in with the Disney culture. However, in January 2021, Robert Rodriguez said that he was hoping that a sequel to the film would be made. Later on, during an interview with "The Nerdy Basement", Rodriguez claimed that he would try pitching an Alita sequel if The Book of Boba Fett series, directed by him, succeeded in "knock[ing] people's socks off." In December 2022, Rodriguez and Cameron took a virtual blood oath to make a sequel. In April 2023, producer Jon Landau confirmed that the sequel was in active development with Rodriguez and Rosa Salazar returning as director and star, respectively. In July the same year, James Cameron reiterated that he is working on more than one sequel. In November 2025, Cameron stated that Rodriguez and he were working on the script together and were committed to making it.

== Legacy ==
In September 2020, a social media campaign took place with fans petitioning for U.S. cinema chain Cinemark to re-release the film in theaters before the end of the year as a way to gauge public interest in a potential sequel. Cinemark quickly responded stating that they were considering it. On October 7, James Cameron confirmed that the film would indeed be returning to select theaters on October 30 while voicing support for #AlitaArmy. Director Robert Rodriguez also voiced his support for the movement. Regal Cinemas and AMC Theatres also confirmed that the film would be shown in their theaters before the former announced the temporary closure of their locations due to diminishing returns as a result of the COVID-19 pandemic. The film was re-released in theatres on October 30, 2020.

About the film's reception, Rodriguez said, "The fans still didn't let anyone forget that they loved that movie. It's almost better than having a movie that does really well but no one remembers in 6 to 8 years."

== Bibliography ==
- 2018: Pat Cadigan: Alita: Battle Angel - Iron City (Prequel-Novel), Titan Books, ISBN 978-1-7856-5837-2
- 2019: Pat Cadigan: Alita: Battle Angel - The Official Movie Novelization, Titan Books, ISBN 978-1-7856-5840-2
- 2019: Abbie Bernstein: Alita: Battle Angel - The Art and Making of the Movie, Titan Books, ISBN 978-1-7856-5808-2
