= Hiroshi Fukutomi =

Japanese anime director (born 1950)

- Born: July 25, 1950 (age 76); Kōchi Prefecture, Japan
- Occupation: Anime director
- Notable work: Kaibutsu-kun

Hiroshi Fukutomi (福冨 博, Fukutomi Hiroshi; former name 福富 博 (read the same)) (born July 25, 1950) is an anime director. After leaving Tokyo Designer Gakuin in the middle of his studies, he joined A Production (then known as Shin'ei Dōga). In 1982, with some of the staff producing Kaibutsu-kun (including Yoshinobu Sanada, Toshiyuki Honda, and Makoto Moriwaki), Fukutomi founded Animal House (あにまる屋, Animaru-ya), now known as Studio Comet.

== Projects as director ==
Listed alphabetically.

- Art of Fighting
- Battle Angel (OVA)
- Captain Tsubasa J
- Doraemon: Nobita's Dinosaur
- Fatal Fury: Legend of the Hungry Wolf
- Flint the Time Detective
- Galactic Patrol Lensman
- Highschool! Kimen-gumi
- Kaibutsu-kun (2nd series)
- Locke the Superman Witch Era
- The Marshmallow Times
- Old Master Q and his Little Water Margin Tale
- Suzuka
- Those Who Hunt Elves 2
- Whistle!
- Hello, Hiroshi and Utako (spin-off of Kaibutsu-kun) (from the end of 2010 at 2011)
