= Last Orders (band) =

- Origin: Newcastle upon Tyne & Cumbria, England
- Genres: Folk
- Years active: 2006–present
- Labels: Fellside Records
- Members: David Jones - Fiddle; Matthew Jones - guitar Kevin Lees - Fiddle; Joe O'Connor - Melodeon

Last Orders is a four-piece folk band originating from Newcastle upon Tyne and Cumbria. The four members of the band met when they were all members of Folkestra, a youth folk ensemble at the Sage Gateshead.

The band consists of Joe O'Connor, David Jones, Matthew Jones and Kevin Lees.

Last Orders won the BBC Radio 2 Young Folk Award 2007 on 1 December 2006. As part of their prize, the band performed at the 2007 Cropredy Festival, Towersey Village Festival and Cambridge Folk Festival.

Last Orders released their self-titled debut album with Fellside Records on 30 July 2007.

== Discography ==
- Last Orders
