= Aqua Knight =

Japanese manga series

- North American cover of the first volume

水中騎士 (Akua Naito)
- Manga
- Written by: Yukito Kishiro
- Published by: Shueisha
- English publisher: NA: Viz Media
- Magazine: Ultra Jump
- Original run: March 20, 1998 – present
- Volumes: 3

Aqua Knight (水中騎士, Akua Naito) is a Japanese manga series written and illustrated by Yukito Kishiro. It's a tale about Ruliya, a female orca-riding knight, making an epic journey through the aqueous world of Marmundo.

After publishing three volumes, Kishiro placed the series on hiatus to draw Battle Angel Alita: Last Order. He has promised to continue Aqua Knight when that is finished.

== Story ==
In the first volume, Lady Ruliya, a young knight in training, becomes lost during a storm and sinks in her submersible armor. A young boy, Ashika, saves her with the help of his father, Arrabarus. She finds herself on the lighthouse island they guard, far away from civilization. As thanks for his help, Ruliya promises Ashika anything, but she immediately regrets it as Ashika wants to become a knight as her. She is a woman of her word and shows her skill as a knight in fighting Arrabarus, who turns out to be an old aqua knight.

However, the duel is interrupted by the travelling genius Alcantara in his flying fortress. He steals the lighthouse's light sphere, which Ashika calls Niselle and claims is his mother. In the ensuing battle, the lighthouse is destroyed and by some mysterious connection this kills Arrabarus. Ashika is also kidnapped. Tagmec, knight of the Underworld, emerges from the sea to claim the old man, but not before Ruliya promises to rescue the boy and the light. Tagmec informs her she is embarking on a quest of destiny. He grants her Muertogara, a magical blade, for this purpose.

In volume two, more is seen of the eccentric Alcantara, his wondrous inventions and his crew, and see how Ashika endures his captivity. Meanwhile, Ruliya pursues them on her orca mount, but comes across a mysterious knight who invites her to his castle in the middle of the sea. He turns out to be a demon knight who is after both Ruliya and her magic sword. Despite his tricks and charms, Ruliya defeats him. Pinoque, a fairy friend from her childhood, returns to her to aid in her quest, and she sets out after Ashika and the light sphere with renewed purpose.

Volume three tells the story of Alcantara, his history in the far-away land of Zygote and his quest in Marmundo. Through a flashback, we learn how he became the greatest genius in Zygote, but was forced to flee because of his unorthodox ideas and dangerous experiments. He escaped Zygote in a zeppelin, taking with him Zykey, a young woman whose mysterious Nil-nil disease prompted him to become the genius he is today. His quest is to cure her of the disease, which makes her disappear gradually.

Lady Ruliya catches up with Alcantara before this, and they duel underwater for the sphere. Ruliya manages to beat Alcantara's masterful swordsmanship in the end, but they emerge from the sea to find that sinister, demonic powers have been plotting to take the sphere for themselves. A great battle against the metal demon ensues, and only with the help of the forces of the Underworld Knight Tagmec can Ruliya finally defeat it with her magic blade. Ashika also denies the demon the sphere by absorbing its light into himself.

Alcantara finds himself seemingly defeated and his inventions in ruins, but finds out that he has found the cure for Zykey's disease by providing her with adventure and a happy life. Zykey reveals her love for Alcantara, and a marriage is arranged. But Alcantara is rescued by his henchmen and flies off in a new zeppelin, followed by a determined Zykey.

== Characters ==
Ruliya of Perla is a young knight in training, on the quest required to become a true knight. Like all knights of Marmundo, she rides an orca and wears a massive, magical armor that increases her strength and allows her to fight under water.

Ashika, a young boy who has grown up on a small island with his father Arrabarus, is an impulsive, emotional child who is as naive and uneducated as he is optimistic. But as he becomes Ruliya's squire and is kidnapped by Alcantara, he is forced to grow up and learn about the world.

Arrabarus, a giant, scarred old man, claims the title of king of the lighthouse island, but has a history as a great aqua knight.

Niselle seems to be a glowing sphere that is the light source of Arrabarus' lighthouse. However, he claims it is his wife and Ashika thinks of Niselle as his mother. She holds some mystic power that Alcantara as well as evil spirits want.

Alcantara, a wandering genius, nobleman, and inventor, has fled his homelands in search of the elixir of life, of which he believes Niselle is an ingredient. Although he seems to be singularly dedicated to his discoveries and inventions, he has softer sides hidden under layers of eccentricity.

Zykey is Alcantara's minion, accompanying him on his journeys. She is a kind young woman who suffers from the strange Nil-Nil disease, which Alcantara has promised to cure.

Zycrow, another of Alcantara's minions, was once an assassin. Now he serves his master and often becomes the unlucky target of his eccentric tempers.

Pinoque is a small fairy girl with butterfly wings. Ruliya saved her when she was a child, and Pinoque has watched over her ever since.

== Setting ==
The world of Marmundo is a big ocean with few islands. The kingdom of Enorme, lady Ruliya's home, claims some of these islands.

Marmundo is separated in two halves — one with the lands where Ruliya comes from, and the Antipodes, where Zygote, home of Alcantara, lies. A great waterfall divides the halves. Marmundo itself is a flat world, with another great waterfall running over the end and into darkness.

The world of Marmundo has a pantheon of gods, where Magna Primero is the greatest. There are also several spheres of spirit powers. Parca, the realm of the dead, is one.
