= Yukito Kishiro =

Japanese manga artist

Yukito Kishiro 木城 ゆきと
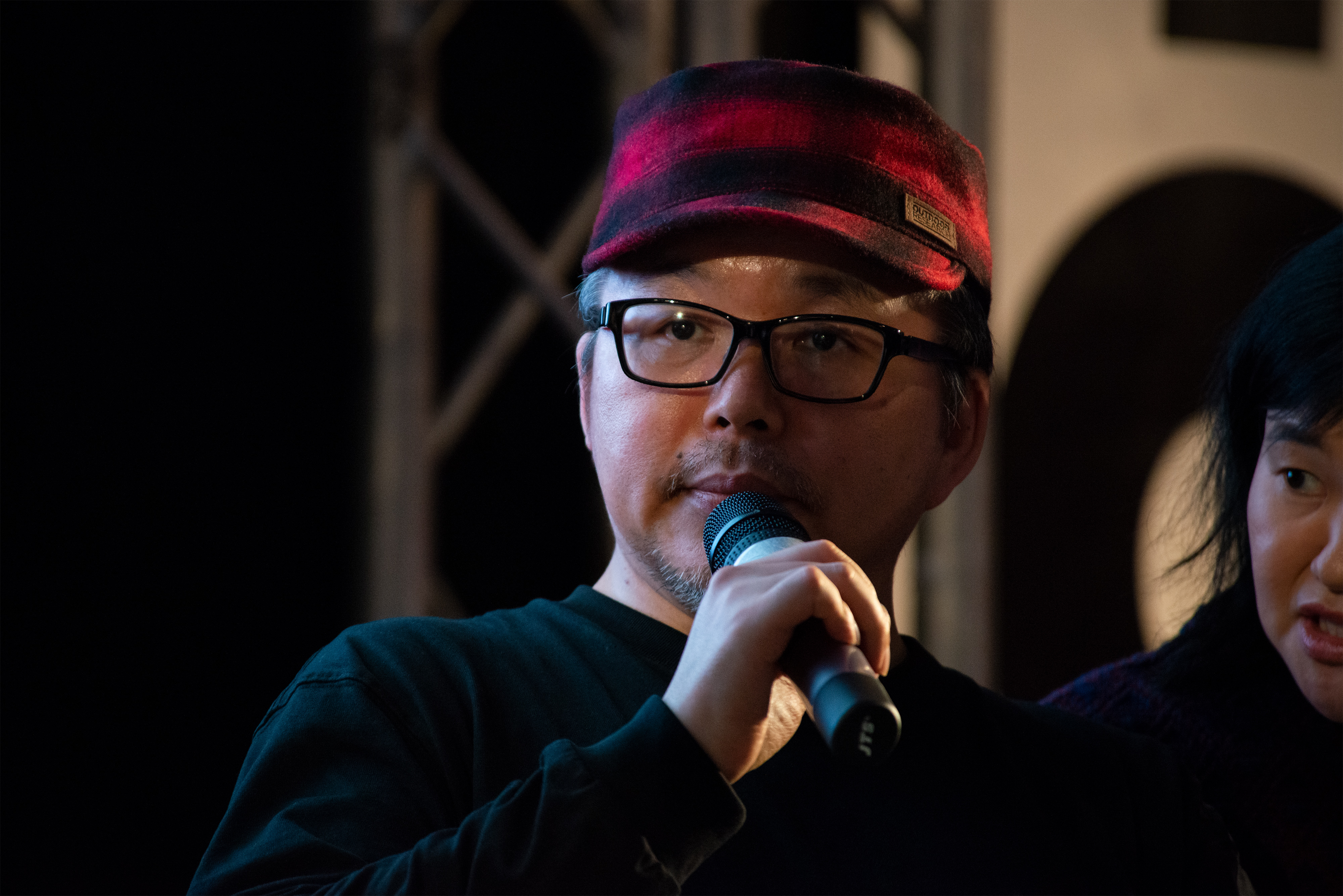
- Yukito Kishiro, Angoulême International Comics Festival 2020
- Born: March 20, 1967 (age 59) Tokyo, Japan
- Area: Manga artist
- Notable works: Battle Angel Alita

Yukito Kishiro (木城 ゆきと, Kishiro Yukito) is a Japanese manga artist born in Tokyo in 1967 and raised in Chiba. As a teenager he was influenced by the mecha anime Armored Trooper Votoms and Mobile Suit Gundam, in particular the designs of Yoshikazu Yasuhiko, as well as the works of manga artist Rumiko Takahashi. He began his career at age 17, with his debut manga, Space Oddity, in the Weekly Shonen Sunday. He is best known for the cyberpunk series Battle Angel Alita.

== Works ==
- Space Oddity (気怪, Kikai; December 5, 1984, published under pseudonym Yukito)
- The Planet of Depths (怪洋星, Kaiyōsei; October 26, 1988)
- Fly (飛人, Hito; January 25, 1989)
- The Great Machine (大・摩神, Dai-Mashīn; 1989)
- Junks: The Space Rovers (宇宙海賊少年団, Uchū Kaizoku Shōnendan; 1990)
- Battle Angel Alita (December 15, 1990–April 1, 1995)
- Future Tokyo Headman (未来東京HEADMAN, Mirai Tōkyō Heddoman; 1991)
- Ashen Victor (1995–1996)
- Battle Angel Alita: Holy Night & Other Stories (January 24, 1997–December 19, 2006)
- Enter the World of Aqua Knight... (水中騎士 特別編, Akua Naito Tokubetsu Hen; January 23, 1998)
- Aqua Knight (March 20, 1998–on hiatus)
- Battle Angel Alita: Last Order (November 18, 2000–January 28, 2014)
- Battle Angel Alita: Mars Chronicle (October 28, 2014–March 11, 2025)
- Mukai: World of Mist (霧界, Mukai; October 28, 2014)
- The Chronicles of Solar Rebels (太陽系叛徒列伝, Taiyōkei Hanto Retsuden; April 23, 2026–present)
- Gunnm Panzer Kunst Chronicle (銃夢機甲術戦記, Ganmu Kikōjutsu Senki; May 5, 2026–present)

== Adaptations ==
- Battle Angel (1993), original video animation directed by Hiroshi Fukutomi, based on the manga Battle Angel Alita
- Alita: Battle Angel (2019), film directed by Robert Rodriguez, based on the manga Battle Angel Alita
