= Last Orders (album) =

Studio album by Last Orders
- Released: July 2007
- Recorded: 2007
- Genre: Folk
- Label: Fellside
- Producer: Paul Adams

Last Orders is the debut self-titled album from English folk band Last Orders. It was released in July 2007 by Fellside Records.

== Track listing ==
All songs Traditional; except where noted.

1. "Polkas" - 3:35
  - O'Keefe's Polka
  - Glen Cottage
  - Camptown Races (Stephen Foster)
2. "Morgan Rattler" - 5:00
  - Barsebak Polka
  - Morgan Rattler
3. "Go to Town" - 3:31
  - Go to Town (Emily Smith, Steve Byrne)
  - The Barrowburn Reel
4. "G Polska"
  - Eklunda Polska
5. "Jigs" - 4:50
  - Waiting for Janet (Andy Cutting)
  - Taking the Tent Down (Julian Sutton)
  - Horizonto (Paul James)
6. "Air & Waltz" - 7:26
  - Calum Sgaire (Traditional, Alasdair Fraser)
  - The Gold Curtain (John Neilson)
7. "Mr Isaac's Maggot" - 5:40
  - Steffans Leken
  - Mr. Isaac's Maggot
8. "The Last of the Great Whales" - 4:23
9. "Reels" - 4:25
  - Emma's Reel
  - Phil Cunningham's Reel (Traditional, Phil Cunningham)
  - Da Sneck o' da Smaalie
10. "Dance Of Delight" - 6:23
  - Tune for Michael (Brian Finnegan)
  - Dance of Delight
11. "Bourrees" - 2:59
  - Van Praetbrug (Wouter Vandenabeele)
  - Reynaud's Bourree (Regis Reynaud)
12. "Toulpagorni" - 5:11
  - Lapp-Lena Vals
  - Toulpagorni (Karl-Johan Andersson)
