= Ashen Victor =

Manga

- North American cover of Ashen Victor

灰者 (Haisha)
- Manga
- Written by: Yukito Kishiro
- Published by: Shueisha
- English publisher: NA: Viz Media (former); Kodansha USA (current)
- Magazine: Ultra Jump
- Original run: September 1995 – July 1996
- Volumes: 1

Ashen Victor, known in Japan as Haisha (灰者), is a futuristic manga by Yukito Kishiro, taking place in the same universe as his Battle Angel Alita series, specifically in the Scrapyard.

== Plot ==
The story takes place before the events of Battle Angel Alita and revolves around Snev, a motorballer nicknamed the "Crash King" due to the way his races usually end. Although a promising athlete, even termed a "prodigy" by his mentors, Snev lacks the confidence to advance his career following a traumatic accident on the track six months earlier.

== Characters ==
Snev

The protagonist and title character, Snev is a young and talented motorball player who has not finished a single race since he started racing for Team Spandau, having crashed each time. However, his brain has remarkably remained intact, enabling him to race again and again. Eventually cut from Team Spandau, he is soon brought back because he has gained a following among motorball fans who actually prefer to see and experience a player crash rather than win a race.

Beretta

A beautiful prostitute and Snev's closest friend. Despite Snev's record, she believes in him and predicts an eventual return for him to motorball which includes victory.

Holmegolud

Team Spandau's tiny engineer, Holmegolud is the only person on the team who still believes earnestly in Snev. He ends up playing a critical role in uncovering the reasons behind Snev's continuous crashes.

Lorna

Beretta's friend. A prostitute herself, Lorna was entrusted by Beretta with seeking Snev out with information that could be of help to him prior to her death.

Ben

Team Spandau's manager, Ben was approached six months ago by the team doctor with a plan to make some chips by testing two drugs for the Megil Corporation, "Accel" and "Adam", on Dragunov and Snev, respectively. He has a tendency to be forgetful, which results in his and the team's undoing.

Dragunov

Snev's sole teammate on Team Spandau, Dragunov is his complete opposite in terms of attitude and racing record, being an arrogant player on track to becoming the next champion. Completely contemptuous of Snev, Dragunov uses the drug "Accel" to accelerate his nervous system.

The Marathon Man

An unknown, mysterious, and probably insane man who, without warning, suddenly jumped onto the motorball track during Snev's debut race six months ago wearing a runner's outfit and began running directly into the path of the players, laughing all the while. He was killed when Snev plowed into him at 300 km/h. The Marathon Man now manifests himself as a violent, self-destructive element of Snev's consciousness that compels him to crash each time he races.

== Depiction of motorball ==
Motorball in Ashen Victor is still focused largely on the players' racing ability. Despite his dismal racing record, Snev impressed those who watched him by performing exceptionally during his tryouts, although it is suggested that talented players like him are becoming a rarity. Players are not explicitly depicted as fighting during a race, and are not yet equipped with the variety of weapons that are seen later on in Battle Angel Alita. However, the sport is moving in a more violent direction driven by the bloodlust of the audience. Ben mentions that motorball is no longer a sport and that the audience now comes more for the violence. Holmegolud, who is much older than he is, also states that motorball is now "all carnage and no skill."

This trend towards an increasing desire for violence on the part of the spectators is also reflected in the results of a viewer poll conducted by the owner of Team Spandau, which finds that their monitor viewers prefer to experience a crash rather than an actual motorball victory. The use of performance-enhancing drugs is also becoming an accepted practice, as is shown in Dragunov's endorsement of the nervous system accelerant "Accel" and its rising popularity. He continues to use the drug after the dissolution of Team Spandau until his retirement from motorball as a result of abusing it.

== Notes and references ==
- Kishiro, Yukito (January 1999). Ashen Victor (1st ed.). San Francisco: Viz Communications. ISBN 1-56931-343-1.
