= Battle Angel (OVA) =

1993 original video animation based on manga by Yukito Kishiro

- Battle Angel DVD released by ADV Films

銃夢 (Ganmu)
- Genre: Cyberpunk
- Created by: Yukito Kishiro
- Original video animation
- Directed by: Hiroshi Fukutomi; Rintaro (supervision)
- Produced by: Kazuhiko Ikeguchi; Jōichi Sugita
- Written by: Akinori Endō
- Music by: Kaoru Wada
- Studio: Madhouse
- Licensed by: UK: Manga Entertainment; US: ADV Films
- Released: June 21, 1993 – August 21, 1993
- Runtime: 30 minutes (each)
- Episodes: 2

Battle Angel, known in Japan as Gunnm (銃夢, Ganmu), is a 1993 original video animation (OVA) based on the Battle Angel Alita manga series by Yukito Kishiro. It is directed by Hiroshi Fukutomi, and jointly produced by KSS Inc., Movic, Animate and Madhouse. The OVA comprises two episodes, Rusty Angel and Tears Sign, corresponding respectively to volumes 1 and 2 of the manga with some differences, serving as a compressed preview for the manga.

According to Kishiro, only two episodes were originally planned since at the time he was too busy with the manga "to review the plan coolly" and he was not serious about an anime adaptation. He has no plans to revive the anime.

== Plot ==
=== Rusty Angel ===
As he scavenges the Zalem dump heap for useful parts, cyberphysician Daisuke Ido comes across the remains of a female cyborg, who is still alive. Ido takes her home and decides to restore her, transferring her into a new cyborg body.

Shortly after, the cyborg, now called Gally, becomes interested in Yugo, a local boy who is performing maintenance work for Ido. After Ido returns home late that night, the following day Gally notices his injured arm, which he explains away as the result of a fall. After introducing herself to Yugo, he convinces her to go with him and the two leave just as Chiren arrives.

Yugo and Gally try to climb onto the roof of an abandoned factory, but they both fall. Instinctively, Gally manages to catch Yugo and land safely. On the roof, they contemplate Zalem as Yugo discusses his interest in the floating city. Gally makes her interest in him known, but Yugo's obsession with Zalem blinds him to this.

Ido and Chiren go out for a drink. Chiren is obsessed with returning to Zalem, and views being in Scrap Iron City and Ido's acceptance of his lot in life as a waste. He warns her not to get involved with The Factory, and says he has no regrets about what happened in Zalem.

That night, Gally is awakened by Ido going out. Curious, she decides to follow. Elsewhere in Scrap Iron City, a lone woman on her way home runs into the criminals Rasha and Grewcica. Before they can do anything to her, Ido appears and attacks Rasha with his rocket hammer, slicing off his left arm, but getting stabbed in the shoulder. Gally then arrives, killing Rasha by punching his head off. Grewcica, enraged at Rasha's death, manages to deflect one of Ido's attacks. He then fights Gally, who slices off his right arm with a kick before knocking him into the sewers. Surprised at Gally's abilities, Ido also notices her bloodlust and regret at not being able to finish Grewcica off.

Ido takes Rasha's head to The Factory to collect the bounty, explaining the nature of his work as a hunter-warrior. Gally, realizing that something has awakened within her, decides to become one as well, but Ido will have none of it, so she runs off.

After sealing their deal with sex, Vector tells Chiren that her part of the bargain involves upgrading the coliseum gladiators. Soon after, a damaged Grewcica arrives at Chiren's apartment, begging for help. His mention of Ido and Gally catches Chiren's attention.

The next day, Ido realizes that Gally's life is hers to lead, but wonders if her desire to follow him as a hunter/warrior is a result of some residual memory. Gally returns to The Factory and registers herself as a hunter-warrior, but when she asks about Zalem, the only answer she gets is "no comment". In the meantime, Chiren starts to rebuild and upgrade Grewcica to defeat Gally. Gally returns to Ido's, where he accepts her decision to become a hunter-warrior. That night, they head out to Bar Kansas, while elsewhere in Scrap Iron City, Yugo robs a cyborg of his spinal column.

Just as they arrive at Bar Kansas, Gally and Ido are confronted by a newly rebuilt and upgraded Grewcica, who uses a cutter installed in one of his fingertips to shred to pieces a stray dog that Gally picked up. Without help from the other hunter-warriors, Gally accepts Grewcica's challenge. Chiren then appears, wondering which of the two cyborgs will prevail.

The scene shifts to the Zalem dump heap, where Gally and Grewcica's fight is watched by Ido, Chiren, and an unnamed hunter-warrior (Gime). Grewcica has an initial advantage, but Gally is able to dodge his subsequent attacks. Using her superior speed and ability to generate plasma, she first disables one, then both of Grewcica's arms before slicing him in two, killing him. Chiren hysterically acknowledges her loss, but vows vengeance. As they leave the dump heap, Gally assures Ido that she will still remain Gally no matter how much she changes.

=== Tears Sign ===
As Yugo and Tanji prepare to leave an alley with their cyborg victim's spinal column, Vector appears and kills the cyborg to eliminate him as a witness, then admonishes Yugo for his carelessness.

At Yugo's place, Gally waits for Yugo with his neighbors, who are skeptical of his plan to get to Zalem. After turning down Vector's offer of a role in his business operations, which include control of the resources sent to Zalem via The Factory tubes, Yugo - intoxicated - is dropped off by Vector, who notices Gally. In his apartment, Yugo discusses his dream of Zalem with Gally. To help him out, she embarks on a bounty spree, earning bags of credit chips.

Later, a customer who has taken Yugo up on his offer for a lube job reveals himself as a hunter-warrior in disguise (Zapan) who realizes that Yugo is about to paralyze him from behind. Tanji attacks Zapan, who deflects his attack and kills him. Yugo throws a fire bottle on Zapan, engulfing him in flames and enabling him to flee, but Zapan knows that there will soon be a bounty on Yugo.

Vector, who is with Chiren at his office, gets a call from Yugo apprising him of the situation and tells Yugo to bring his chips to his office. After the call, a news broadcast reveals that Zahriki, the reigning coliseum champion after Grewcica's disappearance, has lost again. Vector tells Chiren that it will be time to rebuild Zahriki, but Chiren complains that this is moot as all her efforts seem to be fruitless. Vector then notices a newspaper piece on Gally, recognizing her. Chiren also recognizes her, and is surprised at Vector's scheme to have Gally fight in the coliseum for him by using Yugo as leverage. He gives Chiren the task of tracking Gally down with the promise of sending her to Zalem if she succeeds.

Outside The Factory, Ido is surprised at Gally having collected fourteen bounties in seven days, as she did not become a hunter-warrior for the money. As they discuss how Yugo and Gally feel about each other on the way home, they discover from a bounty update broadcast that Yugo is now a bounty. Gime is shown receiving the news as well. Gally sets off to look for Yugo, not finding him at his place. Chiren, who has been on stakeout, follows her.

At the same abandoned factory he visited with Gally in Rusty Angel, Yugo finds that he is 500,000 short of the 10 million chips he needs to buy passage to Zalem from Vector. Gally finds him here, after which they discuss what Yugo will do next. He refuses to relinquish his dream of reaching Zalem. Gally confesses her love for him, but Yugo brushes it off. Desperate to know how he feels about her, Gally confronts him. Yugo admits that they are now partners in crime, and Gally kisses him.

Afterwards, Gally asks Yugo about the scar on his right wrist. As Chiren eavesdrops on their conversation, Yugo reveals his personal history about how the hand is a keepsake of his older brother, an engineer of The Factory who planned to fly to Zalem by constructing an airship. His wife however, betrayed him to The Factory and he was killed by a hunter-warrior (Gime) on the night the airship was finished. Gally reveals that she empathizes with Yugo's sister in-law, and offers to help Yugo get to Zalem. The discussion changes something within Chiren.

After the storm abates, Yugo heads outside. Hearing him suddenly scream, Gally rushes out to find Gime standing over Yugo, whose right arm has been cut off. She attacks Gime, who blocks her attack and claims his right to the bounty on Yugo. He also reveals his jealousy at Gally's having beaten him to all the bounties since Grewcica. Realizing that the relationship between her and Yugo has more meaning, Gime fights her with a double-edged sword. He gets Gally in position to deliver a killing blow, but she blocks his blade with her hands while charging it with electricity. A bolt of lightning that is attracted to the electric charge hits Gime, incinerating him. As Gally holds a dying Yugo and wonders how she can save him, Chiren appears.

Gally then goes to Ido's with Yugo's body and head and begs him to save Yugo. After successfully transplanting Yugo's head onto a cyborg body, Ido reveals that bypassing her life support system and connecting it to Yugo's head kept his brain alive. Gally reveals that Chiren did this, which surprises Ido.

Back at Vector's, Chiren tells him Yugo was killed by a hunter-warrior and that she cannot find Gally. As she is about to leave, Vector tells her that he will now send her to Zalem.

As Yugo lies on the operating table, he overhears Ido tell Gally that the idea of buying passage to Zalem is a lie and no one knows this better than he does, being a former citizen of Zalem. Yugo wakes up screaming in denial and escapes from the clinic. Gally races off in pursuit, while Ido sees the bag of Yugo's chips and becomes enraged.

Going to Vector's office, Ido confronts Vector about lying to Yugo. He also discovers what is left of Chiren: organs and body parts in preservation tubes. Vector reveals that this is to fulfill a monthly quota that comes down from Zalem, and presses a button that reveals Zahriki from behind a screen. Zahriki attacks Ido, who dodges the attack and slices Zahriki in half with his rocket hammer, which flies into and kills Vector.

High above the city, Yugo has started to walk on a Factory tube towards Zalem. Soon, a massive spiked ring comes hurtling down the tube, forcing him to jump to avoid it, but his feet are destroyed in the process. Gally reaches the base of the tube and prepares to follow Yugo, who has survived the first ring to come down, but has lost his feet.

After emerging past the clouds, Yugo can clearly see Zalem. Gally, who has caught up with him, pleads with him to return. Yugo is still adamant about reaching Zalem, but Gally convinces him that they can find a way to live in Scrap Iron City together. Another ring comes hurtling down the tube and Gally's warning comes too late as Yugo is shredded by the ring and thrown into the air. Leaping after him, Gally manages to grab his remaining arm and use her knife to secure herself to the tube. His elbow joints cannot hold however and break loose, but not before Yugo is able to say goodbye, leaving Gally on the tube clutching his forearm.

At sunset, Ido and Gally are in the Zalem dump heap. They place Yugo's forearm and Chiren's earring into a basket attached to a balloon, and release it in the direction of Zalem.

== Soundtracks ==
=== Gunnm: Image Album ===
Gunnm: Image Album

Soundtrack album
- Released: May 21, 1993
- Genre: Anime soundtrack
- Length: 44:16
- Label: KSS Records

Gunnm: Image Album is primarily an image album with songs inspired by the OVA. The exceptions are "Cyborg Mermaid", the ending theme song, and two instrumentals. The album included a sticker and short filmstrip from the OVA.

	Track name	Type	Length
1.	"Rusty Angel"	Vocal	4:19
2.	"Absolute Miracle"	Vocal	3:36
3.	"Gunnm I"	Instrumental	3:14
4.	"Aim"	Vocal	4:55
5.	"Cyborg Mermaid"	Vocal	5:13
6.	"Dear Sweet Heart"	Vocal	4:34
7.	"Keep My Dream"	Vocal	4:25
8.	"Gunnm II"	Instrumental	3:59
9.	"The One I Love"	Vocal	5:32
10.	"Believe in the Fate"	Vocal	4:23

=== Gunnm: Another Story ===
Gunnm: Another Story

Soundtrack album
- Released: June 21, 1993
- Genre: Anime soundtrack
- Length: 41:38
- Label: KSS Records

Gunnm: Another Story is primarily a soundtrack with the exception of "Cyborg Mermaid", the ending theme song, an image track, and two drama tracks.

	Track name	Type	Length
1.	"Satsuriku no Enjeru (Angel of Massacre) Part I"	Drama	8:39
2.	"Believe in the Fate"	Vocal	4:24
3.	"Satsuriku no Enjeru (Angel of Massacre) Part II"	Drama	13:18
4.	"Cyborg Mermaid"	Vocal	5:12
5.	"Ido's Theme"	BGM	1:41
6.	"Infinity"	BGM	1:54
7.	"Joh's Bar"	BGM	1:36
8.	"Gally's Theme"	BGM	1:31
9.	"Scrap Iron"	BGM	1:14
10.	"Action"	Choral	2:05

== Reception ==
The Encyclopedia of Science Fiction described Battle Angel as a dark and lively cyberpunk anime, praising the colourful and violent depiction of Scrap Iron City while finding Gally's characterization somewhat flat. The encyclopedia interpreted the setting as a possible metaphor for social class or capitalism, with the apparently superior city of Zalem functioning as a corrupting aspiration that encourages inhabitants to reject social bonds and commit crimes, while violent cyborg sports distract the population. It also noted that neither the viewer nor most inhabitants of Scrap Iron City learn what life in Zalem is actually like, despite characters such as Yugo believing that reaching it will give their lives value.
