= Battle Angel Alita: Mars Chronicle =

Japanese manga series

- First tankōbon volume cover

銃夢火星戦記 (Ganmu Kasei Senki)
- Genre: Cyberpunk
- Manga
- Written by: Yukito Kishiro
- Published by: Kodansha
- English publisher: NA: Kodansha USA
- Magazine: Evening (2014–2022); Comic Days (2024–2025)
- Original run: 28 October 2014 – 11 March 2025
- Volumes: 11
- Preceded by
- Battle Angel Alita (1990–1995); Battle Angel Alita: Last Order (2000–2014)
- Followed by
- Gunnm: Panzer Kunst Chronicle (2026–)
- icon

Gunnm: Mars Chronicle (銃夢火星戦記, Ganmu Kasei Senki; lit. "Gun Dream: Martian War Chronicles"), also known in its English translation as Battle Angel Alita: Mars Chronicle, is a Japanese science fiction manga series written by Yukito Kishiro and, as sequel to Battle Angel Alita: Last Order, is the third installment of the Battle Angel Alita series.

The story of Mars Chronicles alternates between two timelines: ES 594, three years directly after the event of Last Order, when Alita returns to her home planet Mars for the first time in centuries; and ES 373, during Alita's childhood as the young cyborg girl Yoko trying to survive in the war-torn Mars. The story continued in the fourth series Gunnm: Panzer Kunst Chronicle.

== Plot ==
Mars Chronicle takes place on a colonized Mars. The story alternately tells about the events of the childhood of the main character (373-374 ES (Note: In Last Order, the system of reckoning used in the world of World of Battle Angel Alita becomes known - "satellite era" (e.s.). The starting point is the launch of Sputnik 1 in 1957.)) and about her further adventures in 594 ES.

Long before mastering the Panzer-Kunst (パ ンツァークンスト, Panza kunsuto) technique, Yoko (陽 子), originally known as Galli, tried to survive in the conditions of post-war Mars along with another orphan, Erica. Thanks to Dr. Finch, the cyborg girl and her friend end up in an orphanage for girls in a small Martian settlement. However, Yoko and Erica do not find shelter there for long - the town is attacked by the military. After escaping the attack, the two go in search of Erica's parents. Following the military, mercenaries arrive, whose mission is to find and kidnap Yoko.

Three years after the 10th ZOTT, Alita visits Mars to honor the slaughtered inhabitants of an orphanage she lived at during childhood. At the memorial site, she re-encounters her childhood friend and fellow Künstler Erica—the infamous assassin known as "Frau X"—and is immediately drawn into a Martian power struggle. The plot repeatedly shifts back to Alita's childhood memory after the young Yoko (Alita) and her sisterly companion Erica were saved at the minefield by Gerda and later left in the care of an elderly wandering medic Finch, and the adventures the pair had to endure in order to survive in the chaotic Martian civil conflicts leading up to the Terraforming Wars. Determined to save her childhood companion from the control of the Einherjar, Alita vows to unveil the truth and discover the cure of Necro-Soldiers.

Two orphans, with the help of Dr. Finch, find Erica's house, which turns out to be burned down, and many of her memories of her parents are lies. Meanwhile, Finch finds a connection with Yoko's mother. The girls part ways at Yoko's mother's homestead in the province of Kydonia. The mercenaries chasing Yoko catch up with Finch's van, but are interrupted by a masked man claiming to be the villain Baron Muster. He becomes interested in Erica, believing she holds the key to one of Mars' greatest treasures, and decides to make her his apprentice. Adopted by Muster, Erica demonstrates an inborn attraction to evil, and her fresh outlook of a child allows her to help him find the Martian treasure.

== Publication and creation ==
External videos
- Characters (Japanese)
- Elements of the environment (Japanese)
- 3D modeling (Japanese)

Yukito Kishiro announced the series on 1 January 2014 with the premiere set for the second half of 2014. The manga was launched in Kodansha's Evening magazine on 28 October 2014. Battle Angel Alita: Mars Chronicle was announced as the "final chapter" in the Battle Angel Alita series. Evening ceased its publication on 28 February 2023 and the series resumed on the Comic Days website on 16 January 2024. In November 2024, Kishiro stated on his personal blog that Mars Chronicle would end with its 56th chapter and that the story would continue with a new series in 2025; the final chapter was published on 11 March 2025. In the last volume of Mars Chronicle, released on 23 April, the name of the new series was announced as Gunnm: Panzer Kunst Chronicle (銃夢機甲術戦記, Ganmu Kikō-Jutsu Senki), with its release delayed to 2026. It started on Comic Days on 5 May 2026.

Kodansha USA have licensed the manga for English release in North America.

At the end of the second volume, Hibotaki Tobi's one-shot Mukai (霧界; "World of Mist") was published, the story of which won the award for the best science fiction story. The illustrations were done by Kishiro. The plot of the one-shot tells about a boy stuck in a world where time has stopped.

While working on illustrations for the manga, Kishiro uses both manual work and computer graphics. Background elements, dashed lines and various mechanisms are drawn by hand by Kishiro's assistant, his younger brother Tsutomu.

== Critical reception ==
Manga fragment showing Yukito Kishiro's art style

Anime News Network reviewer Theron Martin noted that Mars Chronicle, in dealing with Gally's formerly mysterious past, is a self-contained story that does not require familiarity with previous works. Speaking about the plot, Martin noted Kishiro's creative style, which is characterized by a constant balancing act between "charmingly cute and incredibly ugly". The critic also praised the mangaka's attention to detail in the futuristic setting and action scene, which, like previous entries in the series, are full of violence and dynamism. Theron criticized minor characters, including the orphan Ninon and the antagonist who appears later, and also noted that part of the audience may find the existence of scenes of violence against children disturbing.

Paste magazine editor Toussaint Egan stated that this installment of the franchise is the least suitable for new readers, and Kishiro's aforementioned work on the setting and action scenes has become weaker according to Egan. Summing up, the critic expressed the opinion that the first chapters of the Mars Chronicle are aimed more at presenting the details of the universe already known to fans than at telling their own story.

In a review from Anime UK News, Yukito Kishiro's future Mars was called "an apocalyptic nightmare", while the German names and the theme of the resettlement of refugees, according to the critic, refer to the Second World War and some contemporary events. Mars Chronicle, the reviewer continues, shows Kishiro's experience as a mangaka. For example, his use of reversals to convey the significance of the moment, or the way he uses scale and the sharp contrast between shadows and light in action scenes.

AIPT critic David Brooke, describing the work as a whole, wrote that the Mars Chronicle carries an important message about the war, and also reveals the world of Gunnm from a new perspective, telling about life on Mars. David also noted that at the time of release, this part of the franchise is Kishiro's best work in technical terms. So, according to the critic, the artistic part is executed with attention to detail, and the moments of emotional intensity touch to the depths of the soul. In addition, the mangaka's environment work, David continues, makes clear the difference between colonized Mars and Earth. Speaking about the further development of the plot, Brook was indignant at the narrative jumping from the past to the future, and the excessive amount of exposition. However, the return of the story to the young Yoko and especially Erika in the fourth volume was received with interest by the critic, praising the adventure in search of the Martian treasure.
