= Battle Angel Alita: Last Order =

Japanese manga series

- First volume cover

銃夢Last Order (Ganmu Rasuto Ōdā)
- Genre: Cyberpunk
- Manga
- Written by: Yukito Kishiro
- Published by: Shueisha (former); Kodansha (current)
- English publisher: NA: Viz Media (former); Kodansha USA (current)
- Magazine: Ultra Jump (2000–2010); Evening (2011–2014)
- Original run: November 18, 2000 – January 28, 2014
- Volumes: 19
- Chronology
- Preceded by: Battle Angel Alita (1990–1995); Followed by: Battle Angel Alita: Mars Chronicle (2014–2025)
- icon

Gunnm: Last Order (Japanese: 銃夢Last Order, Hepburn: Ganmu Rasuto Ōdā), also known as Battle Angel Alita: Last Order in the English translation, is a Japanese science fiction manga series created by Yukito Kishiro and published between 2000 and 2014. It is the second series of the Battle Angel Alita franchise, and a direct sequel to the original series. The series tells the story of Alita (or Gally in the original Japanese version and several other languages) continuing her quest to uncover her mysterious past. The story continued in the third series Battle Angel Alita: Mars Chronicle.

== Story ==
Alita performs an attack in Last Order

Last Order begins when Alita is resurrected by Desty Nova's nanotechnology in the floating city of Tiphares. The city's dark secrets are brutally exposed, but it turns out to be a small part of a complex world. Going into space with new and old companions alike, to look for her lost friend Lou Collins and to find out more about her forgotten past, Alita is caught up in an interplanetary struggle between the major powers of the colonized Solar System. Along the way, she forms an alliance with three of the Alita Replicas who have now begun to think for themselves, an unsavory superhacker, and Nova himself when she enters the Zenith of Things Tournament (Z.O.T.T.), a fighting competition held every ten years. During the course of the story, more background about the setting of Battle Angel Alita that was not disclosed in the prior series is revealed, such as how the Earth emerged from a cataclysmic impact winter that wiped out most of the population.

== Setting ==
Earth is a wasteland after a cataclysmic solar flare and asteroid impact, which created a long impact winter and nearly made humans extinct. Some managed to survive and, with the help of a mysterious quantum computer, rebuild civilization to what it is in Last Order. The colonization of the Solar System and complex politics between the now independent colonies have left the Earth's surface cut off and underdeveloped. The Scrapyard and Tiphares are found in what was once the USA (specifically the area of what is now Kansas City). Tiphares is now a big laboratory for its much more glorious sister city in space–Ketheres.

Tiphares is a futuristic utopian city that is suspended several thousand feet above the Scrapyard. Originally, Tiphares was designed to be a prototype society that was intended to test candidates for the rigors of space travel. However, after the Cam Ranh calamity, Tiphares lost communication with both the surface and its sister city Ketheres. Now, Tiphares is mainly a source of living human brains that are integrated into Ketheres' quantum computing network known as Melchizedek. The original name in Japan is Zalem.

Ketheres is Tiphares' sister city in space, connected to each other through an inertially balanced orbital elevator. It is also connected to an orbital ring, which is balanced by a similar orbital elevator and space city on the opposite side. Ketheres is somewhat of a utopian human society. However, the peace that is enjoyed there is actually a result of a system of mind-controlling computer chip brain implants and a ubiquitous system known as Unanimous. In order to be granted citizenship in Ketheres, individuals must have these implants. The original name in Japan is Jeru.

Leviathan I was once one of five interstellar colony ships, but is the only one remaining after the Cam Ranh calamity caused by Alita's past self Yoko. It's now docked in Earth's second Lagrange point, serving as a space colony. The central hub with artificial gravity houses a whole city and vast war game areas, where people made immortal by nanotechnology pay to fight for fun.

Mars, the first planet to be colonized by Earth, is currently under a four-way civil war with almost every side secretly being backed by one of the major powers of the Solar System.

Venus is being terraformed with the help of a gigantic mirror in orbit, blocking most of the sun and cooling the boiling surface. A number of orbital cities form the République Vénus (Venus Republic) and provide homes for a race of transhuman people with grotesque physiques and a liking of vile debauchery such as quasi-cannibalism. The author uses incorrect French to describe it, the correct form is République de Vénus.

Jupiter is now almost completely covered by an incomplete Dyson Sphere. It is in this sphere where the Jovians, who have given up their human bodies in exchange for cyborg box-like bodies, now live. The materials needed for the completion of the sphere come from Saturn's moons and the asteroid belt — the same moons and asteroids where Venus gets materials for its own terraforming projects, which leads to tensions between Jupiter and Venus.

Type-V mutant is a term used to refer to humans who are infected with a retrovirus called the V-virus. The virus causes mutations in the DNA which result in the carriers exhibiting vampire-like characteristics, most notably pronounced canines and a thirst for blood. The origins of the V-virus have not been made clear, but Type-V mutants have existed throughout human history. Only in the late 20th century did advances in biology reveal that vampires were once humans who had been infected with the V-virus.

== Production ==
=== Premise ===
Last Order continues from volume 9 of Battle Angel Alita, but diverges from the original story, as it takes place after Alita is seemingly killed by a doll bomb but ignores the events of the original ending, such as the transformation of Ketheres into a nanotechnological space flower, Alita's subsequent transformation into a flesh-and-blood human girl and her reunion with Figure.

=== Motivation ===
Kishiro has stated that he was forced to cut Battle Angel Alita short with an ending he wasn't satisfied with. After working on other projects and the manga Aqua Knight, he decided to go back to Alita's story in 2000. Originally, the story was planned to follow that of the PlayStation game Gunnm: Martian Memory, but its story is only used partially and sparingly, as Kishiro expanded and changed the story.

=== Publication ===
Last Order was on hiatus since the 100th installment due to a disagreement between Kishiro and an editor of Shueisha's Ultra Jump magazine. The editor had wanted Kishiro to refrain from using the word "psycho" in his manga dialogue. Kishiro later offered to resume the manga only if the legal department of Ultra Jump apologized to him for revising the three sections of dialogue in the new reprint of Battle Angel Alita, and Shueisha would recall the new reprinted edition and revert the revised sections to their original form. If his requirements were not met, Kishiro threatened to switch publishers to Kodansha's Evening magazine. Kishiro's requirements were apparently rejected by Shueisha and Kodansha subsequently announced that Last Order will join Evening's, starting with its 101st chapter in the 2011 8th issue, released on March 22, 2011. The manga finished on January 28, 2014.
