= Lunar observation =

Methods and instruments used to observe the Moon

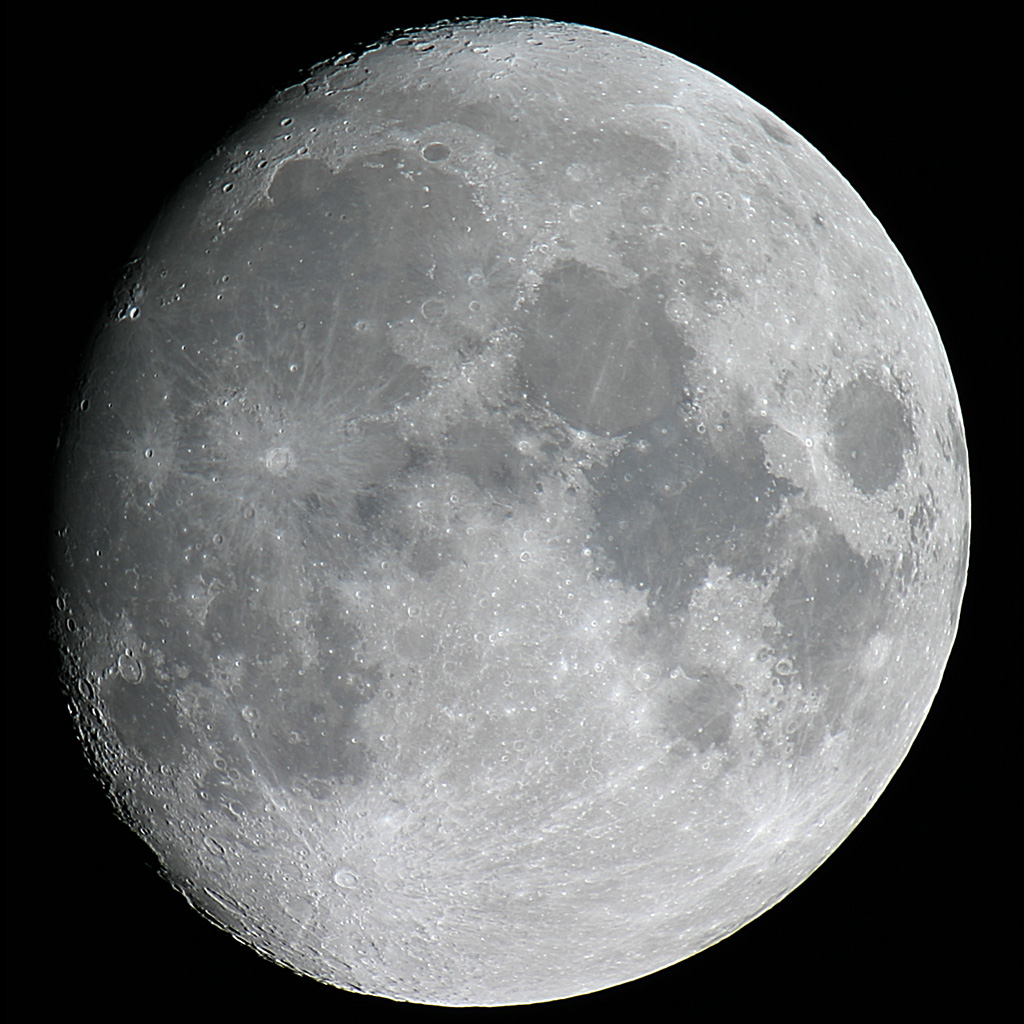
The waxing gibbous Moon as viewed from Earth

The Moon is the largest natural satellite of and the closest major astronomical object to Earth. The Moon may be observed by using a variety of optical instruments, ranging from the naked eye to large telescopes. The Moon is the only celestial body upon which surface features can be discerned with the unaided eyes of most people.

== Phenomena ==
A typical viewing phenomenon is the perceived change of apparent size. While appearing slightly smaller near the horizon, the Moon is perceived larger near the horizon, called the Moon illusion.

== Optimal viewing times ==
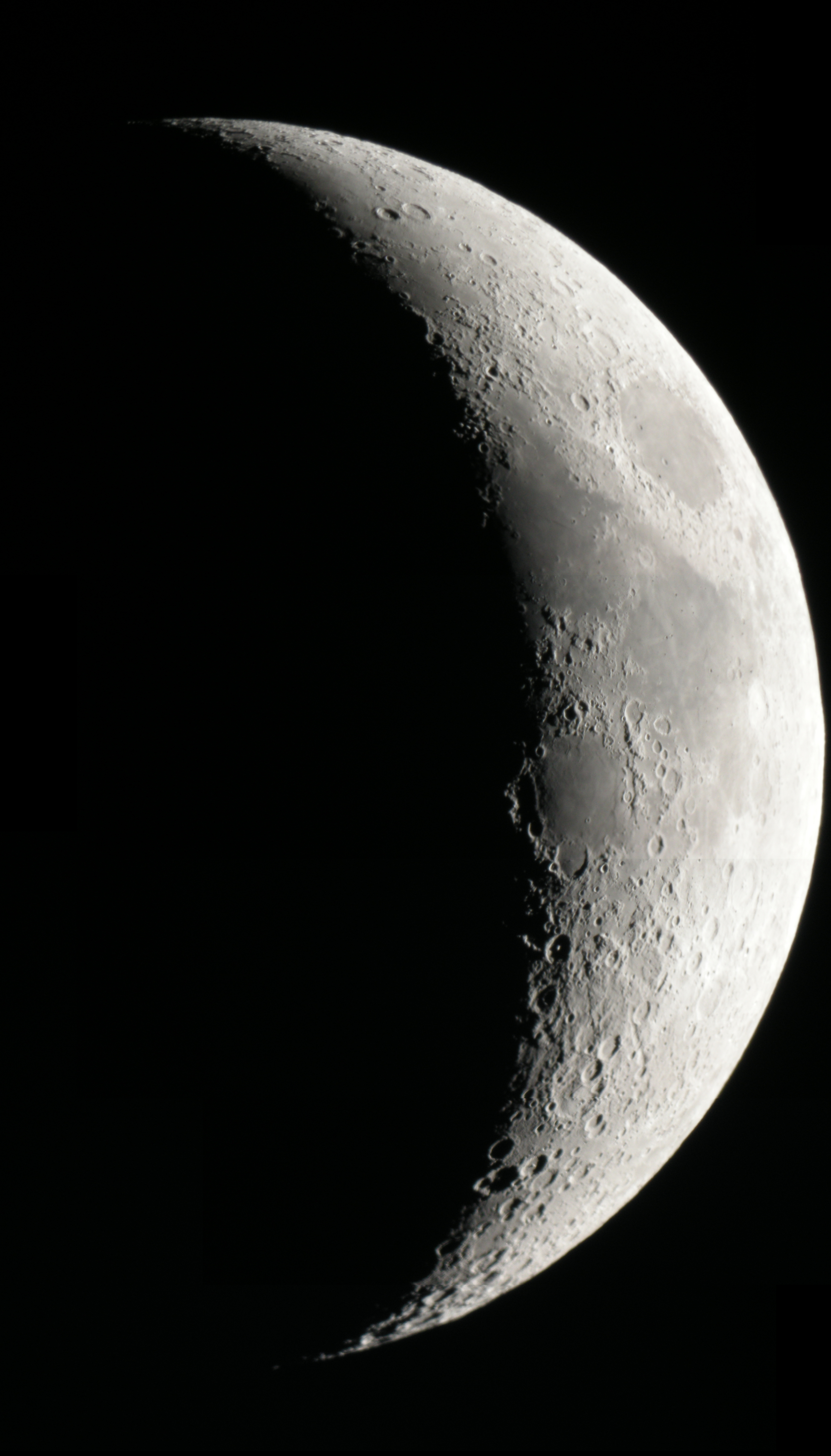
Shadows provide a sense of depth.

Contrary to popular belief, the Moon should ideally not be viewed at its full phase. During a full moon, rays of sunlight are hitting the visible portion of the Moon perpendicular to the surface. As a result, there is less surface detail visible during a full moon than during other phases (such as the quarter and crescent phases) when sunlight hits the Moon at a much shallower angle. The brightness of a full moon as compared to a phase where a smaller percentage of the surface is illuminated tends to wash out substantial amounts of detail and can actually leave an afterimage on an observer's eye that can persist for several minutes. First quarter (six to nine days past new moon) is generally considered the best time to observe the Moon for the average stargazer. Shadows and detail are most pronounced along the "terminator", the dividing line between the illuminated (day side) and dark (night side) of the Moon.

It is a common misconception that the moon is not visible during the daytime, although if the moon is a thin crescent or close to the Sun, viewing can require using a telescope. A person must be very cautious if they use a telescope where the Sun is nearby if they do not have appropriate filtering on that telescope, for the Sun's light is strong enough to very quickly blind a person through a telescope that does not have sufficient filters.

== Suggested viewing tools ==
=== Naked eye ===
Lunar nearside with major maria and craters labeled

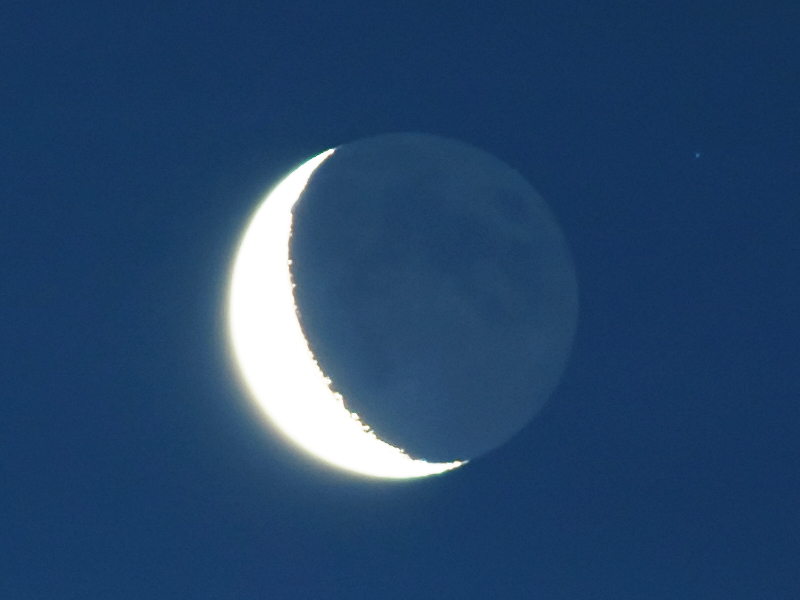
Earthshine reflecting off the Moon. The bright region at left is directly illuminated by sunlight, while the rest of the Moon is faintly lit by sunlight reflected off the Earth.

Generally, the Moon can be viewed even with the naked eye, however it may be more enjoyable with optical instruments. The primary lunar surface features detectable to the naked eye are the lunar maria or "seas", large basaltic plains which form imaginary figures as the traditional "Moon Rabbit" or familiar "Man in the Moon". The maria cover about 35% of the surface. The contrast between the less reflective dark gray maria and the more reflective gray/white lunar highlands is easily visible without optical aid. Under good viewing conditions, those with keen eyesight may also be able to see some of the following features:

1. Bright region around Copernicus
2. Mare Nectaris
3. Mare Humorum
4. Bright region around Kepler
5. Gassendi region
6. Plinius region
7. Mare Vaporum
8. Lubiniesky region
9. Sinus Medii
10. Faintly shaded area near Sacrobosco
11. Dark spot at foot of Mons Huygens
12. Riphean Mountains

Another interesting phenomenon visible with the naked eye is Earthshine. Best visible shortly before or after a new moon (during the waning and waxing crescent phases respectively), Earthshine is the faint glow of the non-illuminated (night) side of the Moon caused by sunlight reflecting off the surface of Earth (which would appear nearly full to an observer situated on the Moon at this time) and onto the night side of the Moon. By the time the Moon reaches first its quarter however, the sunlight illuminated portion of the Moon becomes far too bright for Earthshine to be seen with the naked eye, however it can still be observed telescopically.

=== Binoculars and telephoto camera lenses ===
Binoculars are commonly used by those just beginning to observe the Moon, and many experienced amateur astronomers prefer the view through binoculars over that through higher-power telescopes due to the larger field of view. Their high level of portability makes them the simplest device used to see more detail on the lunar surface than what is visible to the naked eye.

The primary disadvantage of binoculars is that they cannot be held as steadily unless one utilizes a commercial or homemade binocular tripod. The recent introduction of image-stabilized binoculars has changed this to some extent; however, cost is still an issue.

A 10× pair of binoculars will magnify the Moon approximately as much as a 200mm camera lens can. The photos below were shot with a 200mm lens. The first photo was taken on 13 November 2016 at 6:20pm PST, observing the full Moon just hours before it would officially become the largest supermoon since 1948. The second photo was shot 24 hours later, and the contrast was enhanced to bring out details such as mountainous terrain. The next supermoon will not occur this large until the year 2034.

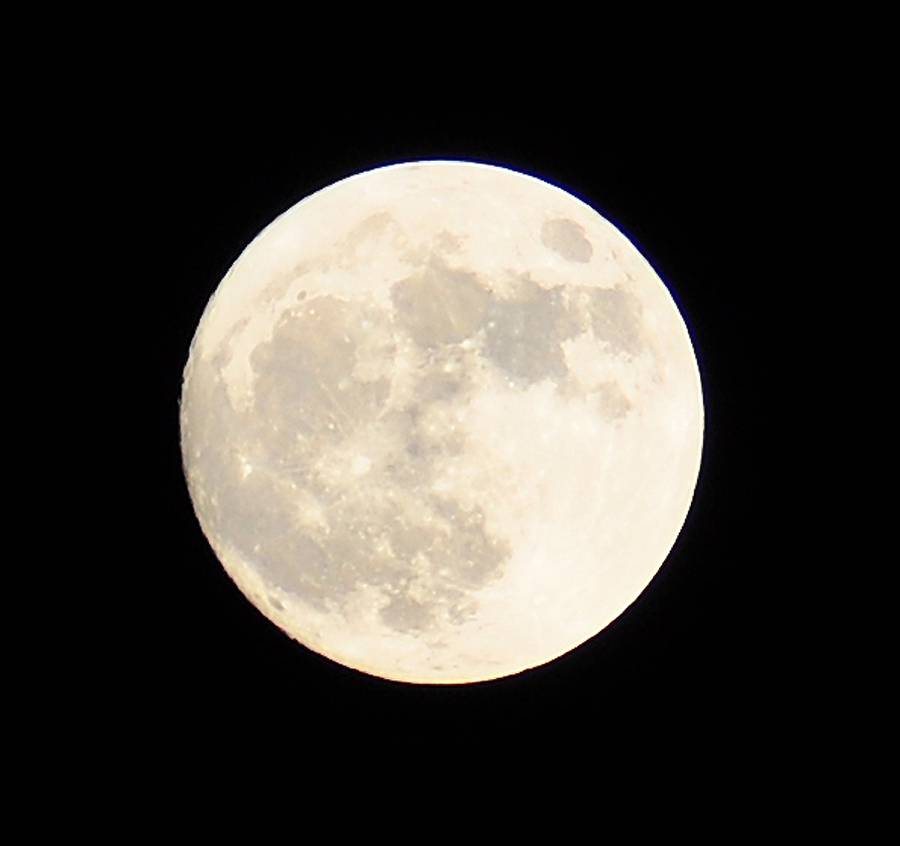
Pre-supermoon on November 13, 2016, at 6:20 pm PST, just a few hours before it would be officially called the "Supermoon of 2016"

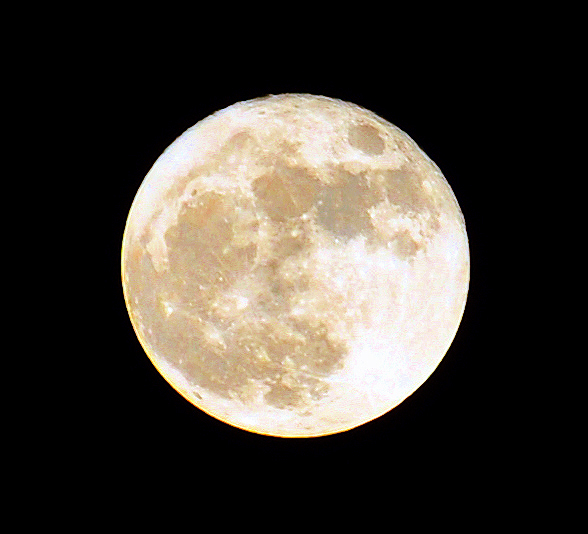
Supermoon officially on November 14, 2016, at 7:19 pm PST

=== Telescopes ===
To some it may be more desirable to utilize a telescope in which case far more options for observing the Moon exist. Even a small, well-made telescope will show the observer much greater detail than is visible with the naked eye or small binoculars. As the aperture of the telescope mirror (in the case of a reflecting telescope) or lens (in the case of a refracting telescope) increases, smaller and smaller features will begin to appear. With large amateur telescopes, features as small as 0.6 miles (1 km) in diameter can be observed depending on atmospheric conditions.

Most astronomers use different kinds of filters in order to bring out the contrast of certain surface features. Simple neutral density filters are also common as they can cut down the amount of light reaching the eye by 60–95%, something that is helpful especially when observing a full or gibbous moon so the surface does not appear as washed out.

== Lunar occultations ==
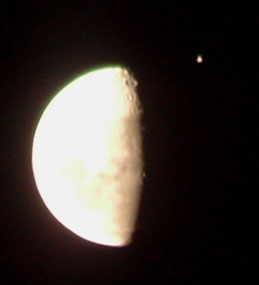
Jupiter (the bright object in the upper right) a few minutes before being occulted by the Moon on June 16, 2005

An occultation is an astronomical event where a celestial object appears completely hidden by another, closer body (with a greater angular diameter) due to the passage of the closer object directly between the more distant object and the observer. Due to the large apparent size of the Moon, lunar occultations are quite common and when a bright celestial object is involved, the result is an event that can be easily observed using the naked eye. The Moon almost constantly occults faint stars as it orbits the Earth but because even a young Moon appears immensely brighter than these stars, these events are difficult to observe using amateur telescopes. However, the Moon does frequently occult brighter stars and even planets due to its close proximity to the ecliptic. Four first magnitude stars, Regulus, Spica, Antares, and Aldebaran, are sufficiently close to the ecliptic that they may be occulted by the Moon. In addition, two star clusters visible to the naked eye, the Beehive Cluster and the Pleiades, are often occulted. Depending on one's location on the Earth, there are usually several occultations involving naked eye objects every year and many more that can be observed using binoculars or a telescope.

Accurate timings (accuracy at least +/-0.02 seconds) of lunar occultations are scientifically useful in fields such as lunar topography, astrometry, and binary star studies and are collected by the International Occultation Timing Association - IOTA. The archive of lunar occultations observations, (1623 to the present day) are maintained at VizieR.

== Transient Lunar Phenomena ==
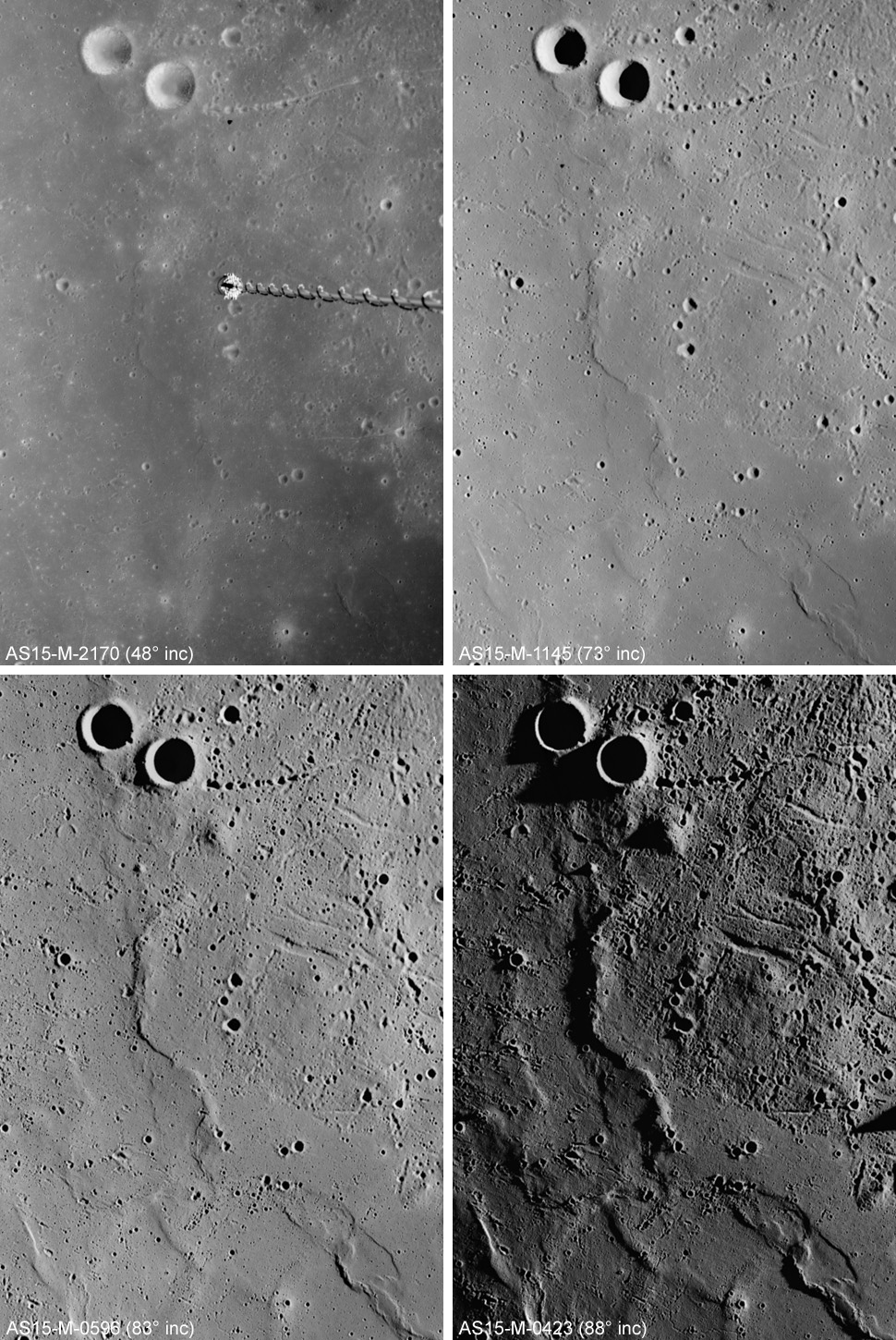
Detailed viewing: frames of the same area in Mare Imbrium, each taken under different solar illumination.

A transient lunar phenomenon (TLP) or "Lunar Transient Phenomena" (LTP), refers to short-lived lights, colors, or changes in appearance of the lunar surface.

Claims of these phenomena go back at least 1,000 years, with some having been observed independently by multiple witnesses or some in the scientific community. Nevertheless, the majority of transient lunar phenomena reports are irreproducible and do not possess adequate control experiments that could be used to distinguish among alternative hypotheses. Few reports concerning these phenomena are ever published in peer reviewed scientific journals, and rightfully or wrongfully, the lunar scientific community rarely discusses these observations.

Most lunar scientists will acknowledge that transient events such as outgassing and impact cratering do occur over geologic time: the controversy lies in the frequency of such events.

A number of astronomical societies around the world have implemented their own TLP watch programs and TLP alert networks.

=== Features with reported TLP Associations ===
Agrippa (crater)
Alphonsus (crater)
Archimedes (crater)
Aristarchus (crater)
Aristoteles (crater)
Atlas (crater)
Bullialdus (crater)
Calippus (crater)
Cassini (crater)
Censorinus (crater)
Clavius (crater)
Cleomedes (crater)
Copernicus (crater)
Eratosthenes (crater)
Fracastorius (crater)
Gassendi (crater)
Grimaldi (crater)
Herodotus (crater)
Sinus Iridum
Kepler (crater)

Lambert (lunar crater)
Linné (crater)
Manilius (crater)
Mare Crisium
Menelaus (crater)
Mons Piton
Mons Pico
Picard (crater)
Plato (crater)
Posidonius (crater)
Proclus (crater)
Promontorium Laplace
Riccioli (crater)
Schickard (crater)
Taruntius (crater)
Theophilus (crater)
Timocharis (crater)
Tycho (crater)
Vallis Schröteri
Zagut (crater)

=== Blinking devices ===
A number of observers employ different colored filters to determine colored transient events on the Moon. By quickly alternating filters of opposing colors in the telescopic light path, faintly colored areas on the Moon can stand out more by appearing to flicker on and off. A red area will appear brighter when viewed through a red filter and darker when seen through a blue filter. It is possible to alternate the filters manually however, this requires a certain dexterity of the hand and good coordination. A purpose built filter wheel is much more viable alternative, and this can be motorized, so the observer can devote all of their concentration to what is going on through the eyepiece. There are, however a number of features on the Moon that will appear to blink naturally, among them being the southwestern part of Fracastorius (crater), and a section of the western wall of Plato (crater). A special filter wheel called a "crater extinction device" is capable of measuring the brightness of an individual lunar feature to be measured according to the point where it ceases to be visible.

== Crescent Moon ==
During the first two weeks, the Moon is called 'crescent' (when the illuminated portion increases) while it is 'falling' for the next two weeks. For two weeks, the crescent Moon wanes before and waxes after new moon, or "change of Moon". The Moon when other than crescent or dark, is called a gibbous, waxing before and waning after full moon.

== Other observations ==
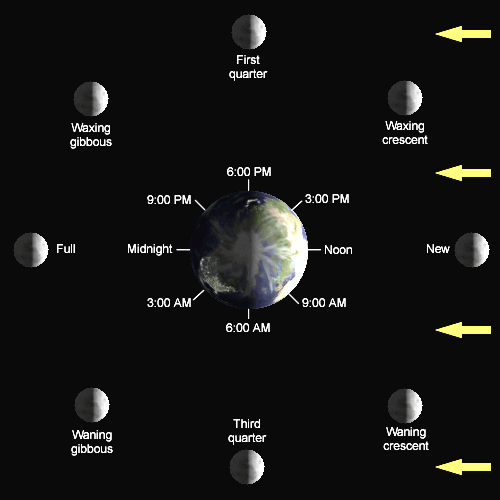
The time of day at a location on Earth (except at the poles) can be inferred from the culmination of the Moon in the sky and its phase: each lunar phase culminates closest to the zenith (being exactly south or north of it, crossing the meridian) in the sky at a specific daytime, as marked in the diagram, rising (east) and setting (west) during the time of the day preceding and succeeding the culmination.

Because the Moon is so bright, it is especially interesting to see objects "superimposed" on it. One particular point of interest is an ISS (International Space Station) transit.

== See also ==
- List of lunar craters
- Moon
- Observational astronomy
- Planetshine
