= Transient lunar phenomenon =

Short-lived light, color, or change in appearance on the surface of the Moon

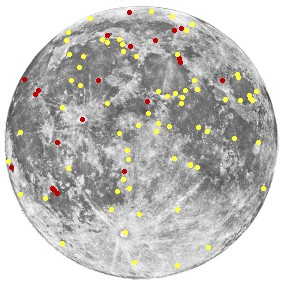
This map, based on a survey of 300 TLPs by Barbara M. Middlehurst and Patrick Moore, shows the approximate distribution of observed events. Red-hued events are in red; the remainder are in yellow.

A transient lunar phenomenon (TLP) or lunar transient phenomenon (LTP) is a short-lived change in light, color or appearance on the surface of the Moon. The term was created by Patrick Moore in his co-authorship of NASA Technical Report R-277 Chronological Catalog of Reported Lunar Events, published in 1968.

Claims of short-lived lunar phenomena go back at least 1,000 years, with some having been observed independently by multiple witnesses or reputable scientists. Nevertheless, the majority of transient lunar phenomenon reports are irreproducible and do not possess adequate control experiments that could be used to distinguish among alternative hypotheses to explain their origins.

Most lunar scientists will acknowledge that transient events such as outgassing and impact cratering do occur over geologic time. The controversy lies in the frequency of such events.

== Description of events ==
Reports of transient lunar phenomena range from foggy patches to permanent changes of the lunar landscape. Cameron classifies these as (1) gaseous, involving mists and other forms of obscuration, (2) reddish colorations, (3) green, blue or violet colorations, (4) brightenings, and (5) darkening. Two extensive catalogs of transient lunar phenomena exist, with the most recent tallying 2,254 events going back to the 6th century. Of the most reliable of these events, at least one-third come from the vicinity of the Aristarchus plateau.

An overview of the more famous historical accounts of transient phenomena include the following:

=== Pre 1700 ===
- On June 18, 1178, five or more monks from Canterbury reported an upheaval on the Moon shortly after sunset:
  There was a bright new moon, and as usual in that phase its horns were tilted toward the east; and suddenly the upper horn split in two. From the midpoint of this division a flaming torch sprang up, spewing out, over a considerable distance, fire, hot coals, and sparks. Meanwhile the body of the moon which was below writhed, as it were, in anxiety, and, to put it in the words of those who reported it to me and saw it with their own eyes, the moon throbbed like a wounded snake. Afterwards it resumed its proper state. This phenomenon was repeated a dozen times or more, the flame assuming various twisting shapes at random and then returning to normal. Then after these transformations the moon from horn to horn, that is along its whole length, took on a blackish appearance.
  This description appears outlandish, perhaps due to the writer's and viewers' lack of understanding of astronomical phenomena. In 1976, Jack Hartung proposed that this described the formation of the Giordano Bruno crater. However, more recent studies suggest that it appears very unlikely the 1178 event was related to the formation of Crater Giordano Bruno, or was even a true transient lunar phenomenon at all. The millions of tons of lunar debris ejected from an impact large enough to leave a 22-km-wide crater would have resulted in an unprecedentedly intense, week-long meteor storm on Earth. No accounts of such a memorable storm have been found in any known historical records, including several astronomical archives from around the world. In light of this, it is suspected that the group of monks (the event's only known witnesses) saw the atmospheric explosion of a directly oncoming meteor in chance alignment, from their specific vantage point, with the far more distant Moon.
- On November 26, 1540, a transient phenomenon appeared between Mare Serenitatis and Mare Imbrium. This event is depicted on a contemporary woodcut.

=== 1701–1800 ===
- On the evening of August 16, 1725, the Italian astronomer Francesco Bianchini saw a reddish light streak across the floor of crater Plato, "like a bar stretching straight from one end to the other" along the major axis of the foreshortened elliptical shape of the crater.
- During the night of April 19, 1787, the British astronomer Sir William Herschel noticed three red glowing spots on the dark part of the Moon. He informed King George III and other astronomers of his observations. Herschel attributed the phenomena to erupting volcanoes and perceived the luminosity of the brightest of the three as greater than the brightness of a comet that had been discovered on April 10. His observations were made while an aurora borealis (northern lights) rippled above Padua, Italy. Aurora activity that far south from the Arctic Circle was very rare. Padua's display and Herschel's observations had happened a few days before the number of sunspots had peaked in May 1787.
- In December 1787, a luminous point was seen by a Maltese observer named d'Angos.
- On September 26, 1789, the German astronomer Johann Hieronymus Schröter noticed a speck of light close to the eastern foot of the Montes Alpes. It was seen on the night side of the Moon and appeared like a star of Magnitude 5 to the naked eye.
- On October 15, 1789, J.H.Schröter observed two bright bursts of light, each one of them composed of many single, separate small sparks, appearing on the night side of the Moon near crater Plato and Mare Imbrium.
- In 1790, Sir William Herschel saw one or more star-like appearances on the eclipsed Moon.
- On November 1–2, 1791, J.H.Schröter noticed the bowl-shaped crater Posidonius A on the floor of crater Posidonius without internal shadow.
- In 1794, a report circulated that it was possible to see a volcano on the Moon with the naked eye.

=== 1801–1900 ===
- Between 1830 and 1840, the German astronomer Johann Heinrich von Mädler observed a strong reddish tint closely east of crater Lichtenberg in Oceanus Procellarum. See also Barcroft in 1940, Haas at a later date, Baum in 1951, and Hill in 1988.
- On November 24, 1865, Williams and two others observed for one hour and a half a distinct bright speck like an 8 magnitude star on the dark side near crater Carlini in Mare Imbrium.
- In 1866, the experienced lunar observer and mapmaker J. F. Julius Schmidt claimed that the Linné crater had changed its appearance. Based on drawings made earlier by J. H. Schröter, as well as personal observations and drawings made between 1841 and 1843, he stated that the crater "at the time of oblique illumination cannot at all be seen" (his emphasis), whereas at high illumination, it was visible as a bright spot. Based on repeat observations, he further stated that "Linné can never be seen under any illumination as a crater of the normal type" and that "a local change has taken place". Today, Linné is visible as a normal young impact crater with a diameter of about 1.5 miles (2.4 km).
- On January 4, 1873, French astronomer Étienne Léopold Trouvelot observed crater Kant which was "filled with mist".
- On August 31, 1877, English amateur astronomer Arthur Stanley Williams noticed some sort of phosphorescent glow on the shadowed southern part of the walled plain named Plato.
- On August 6–7, 1881, German astronomer Hermann Joseph Klein observed the region of craters Aristarchus and Herodotus, and noticed a strong violet glare with some sort of nebulosity.
- On March 27, 1882, A.S.Williams saw the floor of Plato at sunrise "glowing with a curious milky kind of light".
- On July 3, 1882, several residents of Lebanon, Connecticut, observed two pyramidal luminous protuberances on the Moon's upper limb. They were not large, but gave the Moon a look strikingly like that of a horned owl or the head of an English bull terrier.
- On February 19, 1885, Gray saw a small crater near the larger crater Hercules glow dull red "with vivid contrast".
- On February 21, 1885, Knopp observed red patches in crater Cassini.
- In 1887, French amateur astronomer and selenographer Casimir Marie Gaudibert noticed a temporary white spot in the central part of crater Herodotus.
- One night in 1892, American astronomer Edward Emerson Barnard found the bowl of crater Thales filled with luminous haze.
- 1891–1897, American astronomer William Henry Pickering gives drawings of a probable eruption of steam from crater Schröter.
- A photograph made on August 26, 1898, through the équatorial coudé, shows bowl-shaped craterlet Posidonius C on the floor of crater Posidonius as a bright spot without shadow, although the terminator (day-night boundary) was nearby.

=== 1901–1950 ===
- A photograph made on September 30, 1901, through the équatorial coudé, shows bowl-shaped craterlet Posidonius C as an elongated bright spot without shadow, although the photograph was made shortly before sunset at crater Posidonius.
- In 1902, French astronomer Albert Charbonneaux, using the Meudon 33-inch refractor telescope at the Paris Observatory, noticed a small white cloud west of crater Theaetetus.
- In 1905, German astronomer Friedrich Simon Archenhold observed a bright spot at the location of the bowl-shaped craterlet Posidonius C on the floor of crater Posidonius.
- On May 19, 1912, Austrian astronomer and rocketry pioneer Max Valier noticed a small red glowing area on the Moon's night side.
- In January 1913, William Henry Pickering observed the last one of a series of eruptions of some sort of white material at crater Eimmart.
- On June 15, 1913, the British civil engineer and astronomer William Maw observed a 'small reddish spot' in crater South.
- On February 22, 1931, Joulia observed a reddish glow in crater Aristarchus. In the same year (1931) and at the same location, British businessman and amateur astronomer Walter Goodacre and (?) Molesworth (1931?) observed a bluish 'glare'. Percy B. Molesworth ? (1867–1908).
- On June 17, 1931, N.J.Giddings and his wife observed unusual flashes of light (lightning-like phenomena) on the night side of the Moon.
- On August 2, 1939, British observer Patrick Moore noticed that the internal detail of the walled plain Schickard was obliterated by an extensive mist.
- In 1940, American amateur astronomer David P. Barcroft (1897–1974) observed a pronounced reddish-brown color near crater Lichtenberg in Oceanus Procellarum. See also J.H.Mädler between 1830 and 1840, Baum in 1951, and Hill in 1988.
- On July 10, 1941, American amateur astronomer Walter H. Haas noticed a moving dot of white light near crater Hansteen in the southern section of Oceanus Procellarum.
- On August 31, 1944, the floor of the walled plain Schickard looked misty to the Welsh-born engineer and amateur astronomer Hugh Percy Wilkins. Some minor craters in it, which are normally well shadowed, stood out as white spots under a low sun.
- On January 30, 1947, Harold Hill observed an abnormal absence of the main peak's shadow at the central mountain group of crater Eratosthenes.
- On April 15, 1948, F.H.Thornton, using a 9-inch reflector, observed crater Plato and noticed a minute but brilliant flash of light which he described as looking very much like the flash of an AA shell exploding in the air at a distance of about ten miles. In color it was on the orange side of yellow.
- On May 20, 1948, British amateur astronomer Richard M. Baum noted a reddish glow to the northeast of crater Philolaus, which he watched for fifteen minutes before it faded from sight. Three years later he observed another red glow west of crater Lichtenberg.
- On February 10, 1949, F.H.Thornton, using an 18-inch reflector, observed the Cobra-Head of Vallis Schroteri and recorded a "puff of whitish vapour obscuring details for some miles in the area".
- in November 1949, and also in June and July 1950, Bartlett noticed a white spot at the central part of crater Herodotus.

=== 1951–1960 ===
- In 1951, Richard Myer Baum (1930–2017) observed the regions near crater Lichtenberg in Oceanus Procellarum and reported a rose-pink coloration which persisted for a time and then faded. See also J.H.Mädler between 1830 and 1840, Barcroft in 1940, and Hill in 1988.
- On November 15, 1953, Dr. Leon Stuart photographed a lunar flare at approximately 10 miles southeast of crater Pallas. The duration of the flare was 8 to 10 seconds. According to Bonnie Buratti, the coordinates of the impacted object are 3.88° Latitude / 357.71° Longitude.
- On May 11, 1954, Peter Cattermole observed the disappearance of the central mountains of crater Eratosthenes, although the surrounding detail remained clearly visible.
- In 1954, Patrick Moore detected curious ray-like features crossing crater Helmholtz.
- On June 25, 1955, mountaineer and amateur astronomer Valdemar Axel Firsoff observed a faint mist in crater Theophilus.
- On July 15, 1955, V.A.Firsoff observed crater Herodotus which had a 'pseudo central peak' casting a shadow.
- On January 16–17, 1956, Robert Miles of Woodland, Calif., noticed a flash of white or bright blue light east of Mare Crisium.
- On November 2, 1958, the Russian astronomer Nikolai A. Kozyrev observed an apparent half-hour "eruption" that took place on the central peak of Alphonsus crater using a 48-inch (122-cm) reflector telescope equipped with a spectrometer. During this time, the obtained spectra showed evidence for bright gaseous emission bands due to the molecules C_{2} and C_{3}. While exposing his second spectrogram, he noticed "a marked increase in the brightness of the central region and an unusual white colour." Then, "all of a sudden the brightness started to decrease" and the resulting spectrum was normal.
- On November 19, 1958, Raymond J. Stein of Newark observed a change in the shadow of crater Alpetragius.
- On December 23, 1958, Greek observers noticed a greenish coloration at crater Schickard.

=== 1961–1970 ===
- On October 29, 1963, two Aeronautical Chart and Information Center cartographers, James Clarke Greenacre and Edward M. Barr, at the Lowell Observatory, Flagstaff, Arizona, manually recorded very bright red, orange, and pink colour phenomena on the southwest side of Cobra Head; a hill southeast of the lunar valley Vallis Schröteri; and the southwest interior rim of the Aristarchus crater. This event sparked a major change in attitude towards TLP reports. According to Willy Ley: "The first reaction in professional circles was, naturally, surprise, and hard on the heels of the surprise there followed an apologetic attitude, the apologies being directed at a long-dead great astronomer, Sir William Herschel." A notation by Winifred Sawtell Cameron states (1978, Event Serial No. 778): "This and their November observations started the modern interest and observing the Moon." The credibility of their findings stemmed from Greenacre's exemplary reputation as an impeccable cartographer, rather than from any photographic evidence.
- On the night of November 1–2, 1963, a few days after Greenacre's event, at the Observatoire du Pic-du-Midi in the French Pyrenees, Zdeněk Kopal and Thomas Rackham made the first photographs of a "wide area lunar luminescence". His article in Scientific American transformed it into one of the most widely publicized TLP events. Kopal, like others, had argued that Solar Energetic Particles could be the cause of such a phenomenon.
- On July 16, 1964, AAVSO member Thomas A. Cragg (1927–2011) observed a 3 km diameter "temporary hill casting a shadow" southeast of crater Ross D in Mare Tranquillitatis.
- On November 15, 1965, personnel of the Trident Engineering Associates, Inc., Annapolis, Md. observed via Moon-Blink device a color phenomenon which lasted at least four hours.
- On April 30 and May 1, 1966, Peter Sartory, Patrick Moore, P.Ringsdore, T.J.C.A.Moseley, and P.G.Corvan observed a wedge-shaped reddish colored appearance on the eastern part of crater Gassendi's floor.
- In 1967, T.J.C.A.Moseley of the Armagh Observatory recorded a flash in the area of crater Parrot.
- In 1968, J.C.McConnell reported that the north-east wall of crater Posidonius seemed hazy and obscured; the rest of the crater was clearly visible.
- On April 13, 1968, during the eclipse of the Moon, Winifred Cameron of the NASA Goddard Space Flight Center noticed a great many star-like points on the Moon. They were seen by a group of observers who accompanied her.
- K.E.Chilton (1939-1976): "At times, light is polarized in areas on the moon. On the night of September 18, 1968, I was observing the crater Gauss through a polaroid filter to cut down the glare. The eastern wall of the crater was not visible; when the filter was rotated the wall appeared, indicating that the area was reflecting polarized light. Although the same area has been examined since, this phenomenon has not been noticed again".
- On October 31, 1968, K.E.Chilton observed a red-colored glow in crater Eratosthenes. The glow lasted 5 or 6 minutes and then faded to obscurity.
- During the Apollo 11 mission in July 1969, Houston radioed to Apollo 11: "We've got an observation you can make if you have some time up there. There's been some lunar transient events reported in the vicinity of Aristarchus." Astronomers in Bochum, West Germany, had observed a bright glow on the lunar surface—the same sort of eerie luminescence that has intrigued Moon watchers for centuries. The report was passed on to Houston and thence to the astronauts. Neil Armstrong reported back: "Hey, Houston. I'm looking north up toward Aristarchus now, and I can't really tell at that distance whether I really am looking at Aristarchus, but there's an area there that is considerably more illuminated than the surrounding area. It just has – seems to have a slight amount of fluorescence to it as a crater can be seen, and the area around the crater is quite bright."

=== 1971–1980 ===
- During the Apollo 17 mission in December 1972, Lunar Module Pilot Harrison Schmitt observed a bright flash-like phenomenon north of crater Grimaldi while in orbit around the Moon (First Revolution, 21:11:09 GMT, December 10, 1972).
- While in orbit, Command Module Pilot Ronald Evans of Apollo 17 noticed a light flash eastward of Mare Orientale (14th Revolution, 22:28:27 GMT, December 11, 1972).
- In September 1973, the Dutch author of books on mysterious phenomena Hans van Kampen and a friend (Van Cleef) observed near crater Linné a bright point of light which was visible for almost two minutes.

=== 1981–1990 ===
- On December 27, 1982, British Moon observer Harold Hill noticed the absence of the principal craterlet (Nasmyth A) on the floor of the crater Nasmyth. A similar phenomenon was noticed by P.Wade on December 8, 1981.
- On January 1, 1983, Harold Hill noticed an unusual bright appearance of craterlet Furnerius A near the pronounced crater Furnerius at the evening terminator.
- On January 29, 1983, several members of the British Astronomical Association (BAA) observed abnormal brightness and purplish coloration at the bowl shaped crater Torricelli B north-northeast of the pear shaped crater Torricelli in Sinus Asperitatis.
- On October 29, 1983, Harold Hill observed abnormal brightness at the hillock just north of crater Kirch.
- On December 28, 1985, Harold Hill observed an extraordinary brilliance at the mid-section of the east inner wall of crater Peirescius.
- On April 1, 1988, Harold Hill noticed rosy-tinged areas fringing the northern edge of the lava sheet near crater Lichtenberg in Oceanus Procellarum. See also J.H.Mädler between 1830 and 1840, Barcroft in 1940, and Baum in 1951.

=== 1991–2000 ===
- In 1992, Audouin Dollfus of the Observatoire de Paris reported anomalous features on the floor of Langrenus crater using a one-meter (3.2-foot) telescope. While observations on the night of December 29, 1992, were normal, unusually high albedo and polarization features were recorded the following night that did not change in appearance over the six minutes of data collection. Observations three days later showed a similar, but smaller, anomaly in the same vicinity. While the viewing conditions for this region were close to specular, it was argued that the amplitude of the observations were not consistent with a specular reflection of sunlight. The favored hypothesis was that this was the consequence of light scattering from clouds of airborne particles resulting from a release of gas. The fractured floor of this crater was cited as a possible source of the gas.

=== No date given ===
- Johann Hieronymus Schröter once saw for a short time on the lunar night side, near craters Agrippa and Godin, a minute point of light.
- J Adams (English Mechanic N°2374) noted on two occasions near sunrise, when the interior of the walled plain Plato was filled with shadow, that two beams of light traversed two-thirds of the floor from the western wall resembling searchlights; they were parallel and well-defined, and had the appearance of passing through a slight vapour resting on the surface.
- Harold Hill (1920-2005): "A number of observers have claimed in the past that the inner slopes of the formation Young have a greenish, almost translucent cast or sheen when seen at the evening terminator."
- Patrick Moore: "There is a darkish streak across the floor of crater Fracastorius which is of a slightly reddish hue, and is detectable with a moonblink device."
- American amateur astronomer David Barcroft (1897–1974) had seen the crater Timocharis "filled with vapor and very indistinct near full moon".
- Spanish astronomer Josep Comas i Solà once saw crater Reiner "as a white patch when it should have been sharply defined".
- T. W. Webb recommended crater Cichus (in the eastern part of Palus Epidemiarum) for further detailed study. In Cichus, a small crater seemed to have grown larger as compared to the earlier representations by Schröter and Mädler.

== Explanations ==
Explanations for the transient lunar phenomena fall in four classes: outgassing, impact events, electrostatic phenomena, and unfavorable observation conditions.

=== Outgassing ===
Some TLPs may be caused by gas escaping from underground cavities. These gaseous events are purported to display a distinctive reddish hue, while others have appeared as white clouds or an indistinct haze. The majority of TLPs appear to be associated with floor-fractured craters, the edges of lunar maria, or in other locations linked by geologists with volcanic activity. However, these are some of the most common targets when viewing the Moon, and this correlation could be an observational bias.

In support of the outgassing hypothesis, data from the Lunar Prospector alpha particle spectrometer indicate the recent outgassing of radon to the surface. In particular, results show that radon gas was emanating from the vicinity of the craters Aristarchus and Kepler during the time of this two-year mission. These observations could be explained by the slow and visually imperceptible diffusion of gas to the surface, or by discrete explosive events. In support of explosive outgassing, it has been suggested that a roughly 3 km (1.9 mi) diameter region of the lunar surface was "recently" modified by a gas release event. The age of this feature is believed to be about 1 million years old, suggesting that such large phenomena occur only infrequently.

=== Impact events ===
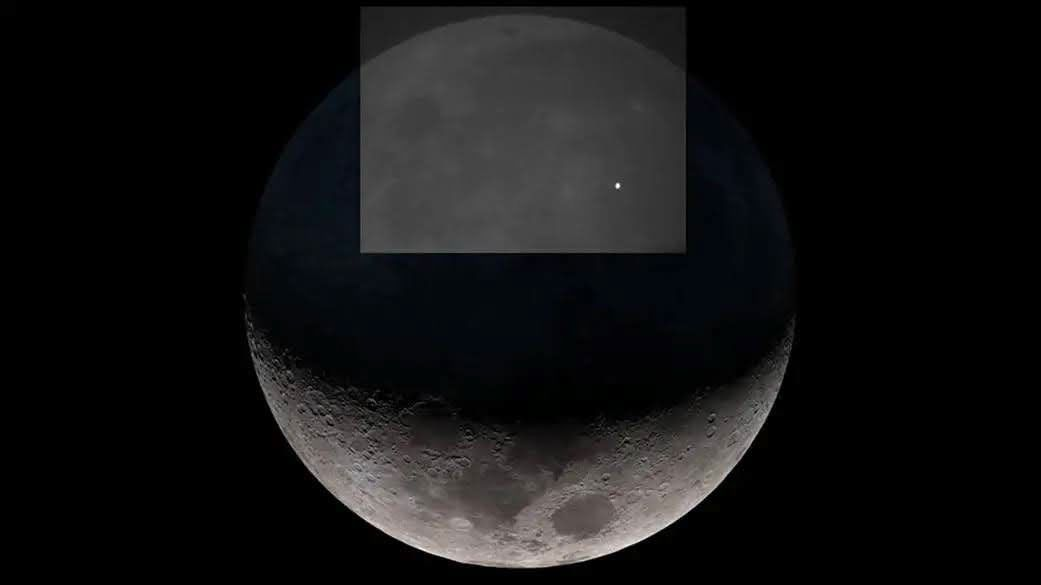
Lunar impact flash image shown superimposed on the Moon

Impact events are continually occurring on the lunar surface. The most common events are those associated with micrometeorites, as might be encountered during meteor showers. First witnessed in 1972 on three occasions by the crew of Apollo 17, impact flashes from such events have been detected from multiple and simultaneous Earth-based observations. Tables of impacts recorded by video cameras exist for years since 2005 many of which are associated with meteor showers. Furthermore, impact clouds were detected following the crash of ESA's SMART-1 spacecraft, India's Moon Impact Probe and NASA's LCROSS. Impact events leave a visible scar on the surface, and these could be detected by analyzing before and after photos of sufficiently high resolution. No impact craters formed between the Clementine (global resolution 100 metre, selected areas 7–20 metre) and SMART-1 (resolution 50 metre) missions have been identified.

NELIOTA successfully observed a wide range of impacts. The observations took place from 2017 to 2023. During these years, 192 lunar impact flashes were detected, and the size and mass of the asteroids were also measured, as well as the temperature during the collisions and the size of the craters created. As a result, apart from completing its main goal, it also became the largest study on asteroid collisions with the Moon.

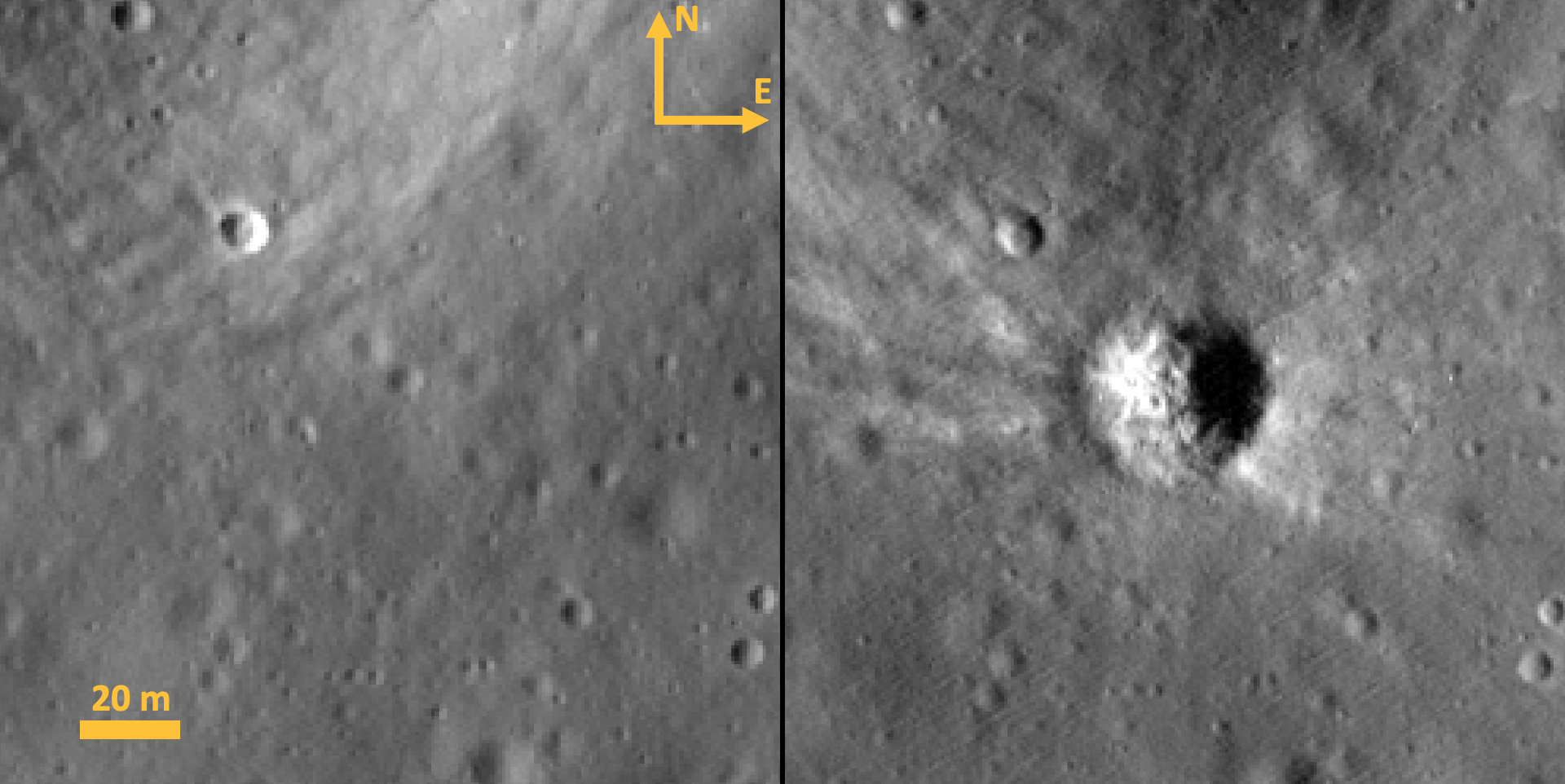
From Rizos et al. 2025. The left panel shows the impact site before the event, while the right panel shows the newly formed crater as imaged by the Lunar Reconnaissance Orbiter Narrow Angle Camera (LROC NAC). The crater measures approximately 35 m in diameter.

A detailed study published in 2025 analyzed the crater produced by the brightest lunar impact flash ever recorded, observed on 11 September 2013. Using pre- and post-impact images acquired by the Lunar Reconnaissance Orbiter (LRO), the authors measured a crater diameter of 35 ± 0.7 m and identified an asymmetric ejecta blanket extending more than 2 km from the impact site. The study also reported the first detection of spectral color changes associated with a recent lunar impact, finding an average reddening of 16.5% in the central ejecta region. Analysis of the ejecta morphology and impact geometry indicated that the impactor was most likely a sporadic meteoroid rather than a member of the September ε-Perseids meteor shower.

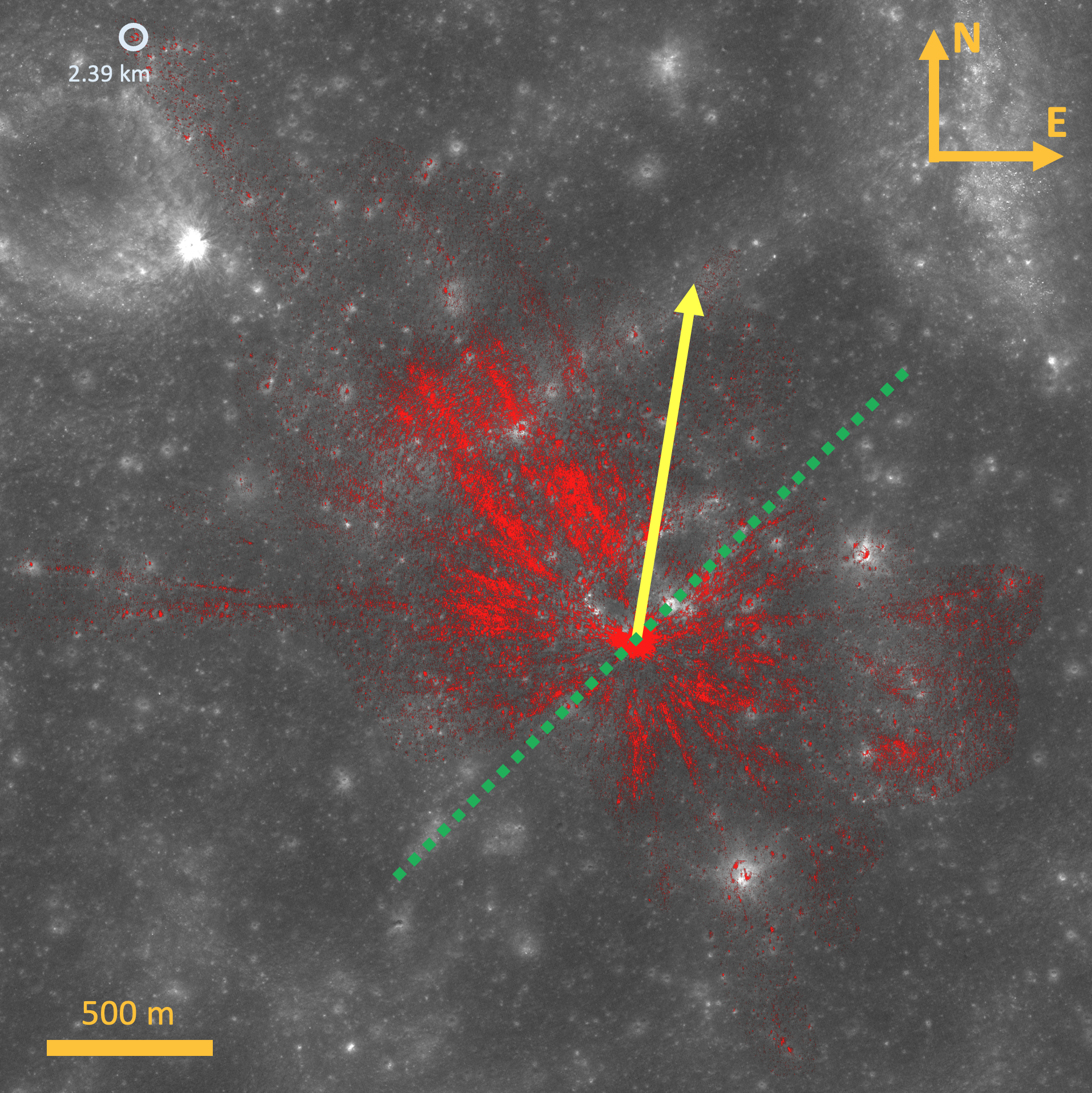
From Rizos et al. 2025. Ejecta blanket produced by the brightest lunar impact flash ever recorded, observed on 11 September 2013. Red pixels indicate ejecta material identified through clustering analysis of Lunar Reconnaissance Orbiter (LRO) images.

On April 6, 2026, Astronauts Reid Wiseman and Jeremy Hansen each reported seeing three flashes during a portion of Artemis II's flyby of the Moon when the spacecraft passed through a total solar eclipse. NASA has described these as "impact flashes" and "light flashes created by meteoroids impacting the lunar surface." This was accompanied by a beforehand call by NASA for citizen science impact event observation.

=== Electrostatic phenomena ===
It has been suggested that effects related to either electrostatic charging or discharging might be able to account for some of the transient lunar phenomena. One possibility is that electrodynamic effects related to the fracturing of near-surface materials could charge any gases that might be present, such as implanted solar wind or radiogenic daughter products. If this were to occur at the surface, the subsequent discharge from this gas might be able to give rise to phenomena visible from Earth. Alternatively, it has been proposed that the triboelectric charging of particles within a gas-borne dust cloud could give rise to electrostatic discharges visible from Earth. Finally, electrostatic levitation of dust near the terminator could potentially give rise to some form of phenomenon visible from Earth.

=== Unfavourable observation conditions ===
Eight individual frames taken from a video of the lunar crater Clavius showing the effect of the Earth's atmosphere on astronomical images

It is possible that many transient phenomena might not be associated with the Moon itself but could be a result of unfavourable observing conditions or phenomena associated with the Earth. For instance, some reported transient phenomena are for objects near the resolution of the employed telescopes. The Earth's atmosphere can give rise to significant temporal distortions that could be confused with actual lunar phenomena (an effect known as astronomical seeing). Other non-lunar explanations include the viewing of Earth-orbiting satellites and meteors or observational error.

== Debated status of TLPs ==
The most significant problem that faces reports of transient lunar phenomena is that the vast majority of these were made either by a single observer or at a single location on Earth (or both). The multitude of reports for transient phenomena occurring at the same place on the Moon could be used as evidence supporting their existence. However, in the absence of eyewitness reports from multiple observers at multiple locations on Earth for the same event, these must be regarded with caution. As discussed above, an equally plausible hypothesis for some of these events is that they are caused by the terrestrial atmosphere. If an event were to be observed at two different places on Earth at the same time, this could be used as evidence against an atmospheric origin.

One attempt to overcome the above problems with transient phenomena reports was made during the Clementine mission by a network of amateur astronomers. Several events were reported, of which four of these were photographed both beforehand and afterward by the spacecraft. However, careful analysis of these images shows no discernible differences at these sites. This does not necessarily imply that these reports were a result of observational error, as it is possible that outgassing events on the lunar surface might not leave a visible marker, but neither is it encouraging for the hypothesis that these were authentic lunar phenomena.

Observations are currently being coordinated by the Association of Lunar and Planetary Observers and the British Astronomical Association to re-observe sites where transient lunar phenomena were reported in the past. By documenting the appearance of these features under the same illumination and libration conditions, it is possible to judge whether some reports were simply due to a misinterpretation of what the observer regarded as an abnormality. Furthermore, with digital images, it is possible to simulate atmospheric spectral dispersion, astronomical seeing blur and light scattering by our atmosphere to determine if these phenomena could explain some of the original TLP reports.

== Literature ==
- William R. Corliss: Mysterious Universe, A Handbook of Astronomical Anomalies (The Sourcebook Project, 1979).
- William R. Corliss: The Moon and the Planets, A Catalog of Astronomical Anomalies (The Sourcebook Project, 1985).
- Thomas William Webb: Celestial Objects for Common Telescopes, Volume 1: The Solar System (Dover Publications, 1962).
- Valdemar Axel Firsoff: The Old Moon and the New (Sidgwick & Jackson – London, 1969).
- A.J.M.Wanders: Op Ontdekking in het Maanland (Het Spectrum, 1949).
- Harry de Meyer: Maanmonografieën (Vereniging Voor Sterrenkunde, VVS, 1969).
- Patrick Moore: New Guide to the Moon (W.W.Norton & Company, 1976).
- Harold Hill: A Portfolio of Lunar Drawings (Cambridge University Press, 1991).
- Don E. Wilhelms: To a Rocky Moon, a Geologist's History of Lunar Exploration (The University of Arizona Press, 1993).
- William P. Sheehan & Thomas A. Dobbins: Epic Moon, A History of Lunar Exploration in the Age of the Telescope (Willmann Bell, 2001).

== See also ==
- Geology of the Moon
- Lunar lava tube
- Lunar soil (see: Moon dust fountains and electrostatic levitation)
- Lunar swirls
- Observing the Moon
- Project A119
- Project Moon-Blink, a 1960s NASA investigation into transient lunar phenomena
- Selenography
- Splitting of the Moon
