= Project Moon-Blink =

Project Moon-Blink was a draft NASA program concept created in 1965-1966, for the exploration of unusual phenomena (anomalies) on the surface of the Moon. Work performed by Trident Engineering Associates (Annapolis, Maryland) under contract NAS 5-9613 dated June 1, 1965, Goddard Space Flight Center (Greenbelt, Maryland).

== Project goals and objectives ==
- Development of devices to improve observation of unusual color occurrences on the moon in order to record and identify such phenomena.
- Lunar surveillance program via telescope employing this especially designed equipment.

== History ==
In a report issued by NASA in October 1966, the background is described as follows:

There have been some puzzling reports over the years. Before 1843 astronomers listed Linne as a normal but steep-walled crater about five miles in diameter. In 1866 Schmidt, a famed astronomer, reported that Linne was not a crater at all but looked more like a whitish cloud. Later observers disagreed with both descriptions, saying it was a low "mound" about four miles across, with a deep crater one mile in diameter in its top. Much later — in 1961 — Patrick Moore, one of the foremost contemporary lunar astronomers, was astonished that Linne appeared to be a normal crater about three miles in diameter. Moore examined it with two telescopes then called another astronomer. He examined it with a third instrument and reported a similar inexplicable appearance. The following night was cloudy, but the next night Linne appeared as Moore had always seen it — a gently rounded dome with a small crater on top. Moore attributed the changes to unusual lighting effects. During the past ten years several incontrovertible observations have been reported of unusual color activity on or just above the lunar surface. These may be divided into two categories: those events localized to a few square miles of lunar area and those covering a significant portion of the lunar surface. Insufficient evidence exists at present to determine whether these two types of events are similar or dissimilar in nature. However, they both manifest themselves in the red portion of the visible spectrum. The localized observations to date have occurred most frequently in two lunar areas: the Aristarchus region and Alphonsus. Appendix I of this-report lists a number of modern observations which are peculiar because of color changes. Most were of short duration — minutes or hours. The detection of these transient events demands a program of constant surveillance of the moon with suitable astronomical instruments. This was strongly recommended by Dr. Zdeněk Kopal at Commission 17 (The Moon) sponsored by the IAU and NASA at Goddard Space Flight Center on April 15–16, 1965. A surveillance program utilizing large astronomical telescopes inherently capable of detecting these occurrences is not feasible because of problems caused by economics and/or by prior commitments.

The Moon-Blink detector has been designed based on the principle that the observer will be immediately drawn to any movement taking place on parts of a large static images. The principle of operation of the detector is described next:

In the Moon-Blink detector the telescopic image is intercepted by alternating red and blue filters at a rate of approximately 120 times per minute. When this image is viewed by a suitable electro-optical device, changes in color at either end of the visible spectrum will appear as a «blink» on the face of the image tube, thus drawing the eye to the spot. Figure 1 shows the detector components and Figure2 shows the device installed. A more complete description of the Moon-Blink detector is included as Appendix II.

== Experimental results and conclusions ==
- Red colorations do appear on the lunar surface.
- These colorations may persist for several hours. The Trident sighting, on November 15, 1965, lasted at least four hours (sunrise prevented further viewing).
- The detection capability of the Moon-Blink device is much greater than direct viewing or conventional color photography.
- The "Hot-line" technique (telephone conference network) is an effective means of alerting other observatories.
- The effectiveness of unpaid volunteer observers is doubtful.

== Literature ==
- Valdemar Axel Firsoff, The Old Moon and the New, Sidgwick & Jackson - London, 1969
- Patrick Moore, New Guide to the Moon, W. W. Norton & Company - Inc - New York, 1976
- William P. Sheehan, Thomas A. Dobbins: Epic Moon, a history of lunar exploration in the age of the telescope, Willmann-Bell - 2001
