= Daniell (crater) =

Crater on the Moon

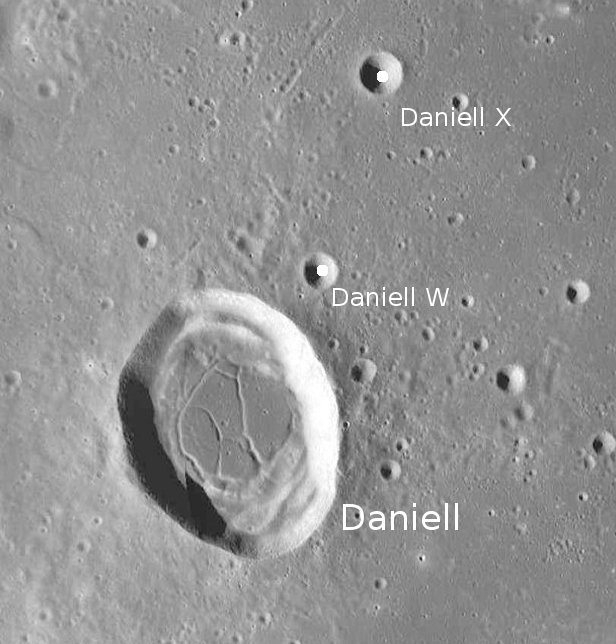
- Daniell and two satellite craters, W and X
- Coordinates: 35.42°N 31.16°E
- Diameter: 28.20 km (17.52 mi)
- Depth: 1.9 km (1.2 mi)
- Colongitude: 329° at sunrise
- Formation: Copernican
- Eponym: John F. Daniell

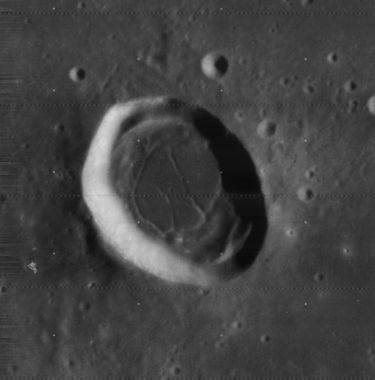
Lunar Orbiter 4 image of Daniell (note different lighting than above)

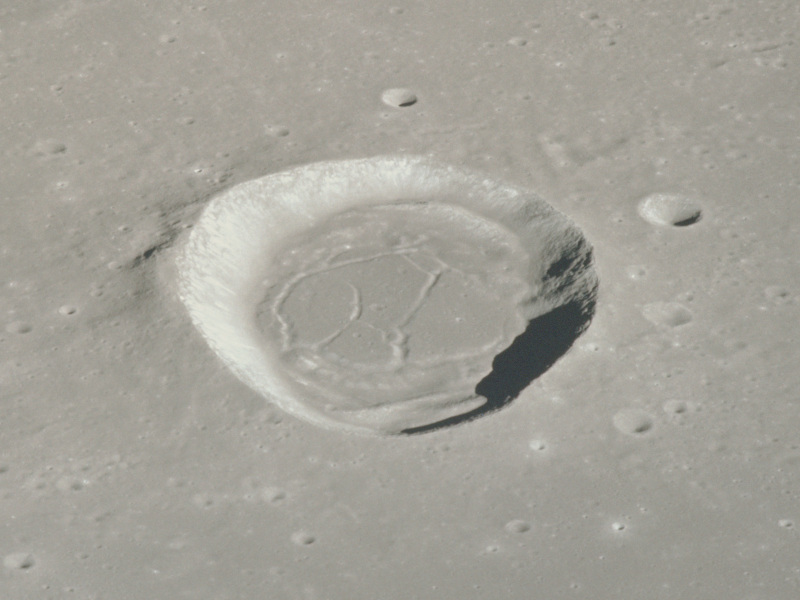
Apollo 15 image

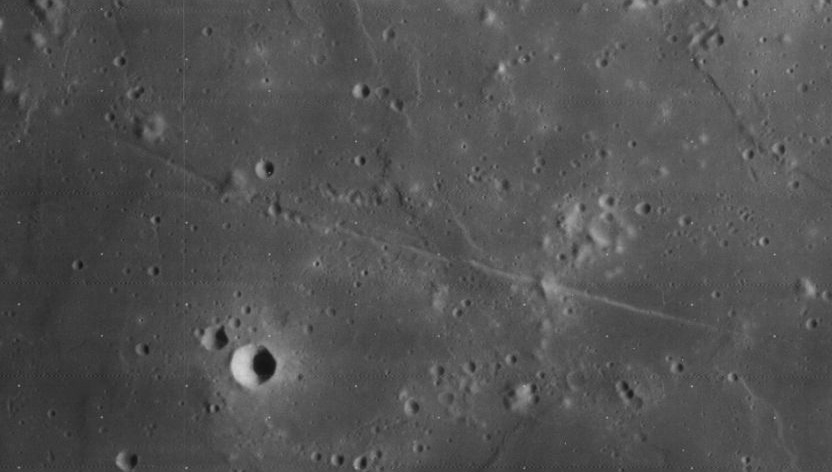
Lunar Orbiter 4 image of Rimae Daniell

Daniell is a lunar impact crater located in the southern half of the Lacus Somniorum. To the south-southeast is the much larger crater Posidonius. The Rimae Daniell rille system is to the west of Daniell crater, and consists of a set of graben oriented along a NNW-SSE direction. This feature can be resolved with a 150 mm (6 in) telescope.

The Daniell formation dates to the Copernican period on the lunar geologic timescale. The rim is oval in form, with the long axis oriented north-northwest to south-southeast. Most of the wall is well-formed and relatively free of wear, although it appears slumped at the southern end. The interior lacks a central peak.

The floor surface has a lower albedo than the surroundings and is fractured. Lunar geologist Chuck Wood speculated that the fractured floor may have been uplifted by the massive slumps on northwest and southeast rims. The mineralogical composition of the floor consists of pyroxenes with pyroclastic deposits on the low albedo areas.

The crater is named after British physicist, chemist, and meteorologist John F. Daniell (1790-1845). His name was included in the lunar nomenclature of William R. Birt and John Lee during the 19th century. Its designation was formally adopted by the International Astronomical Union in 1935.

== Bright satellite crater Daniell D during full moon ==
West-northwest of Daniell, near Rimae Daniell, the rather small bright satellite crater Daniell D forms a trio with the satellite craters Luther H and Luther X. These three bright craterlets, appearing as an arc-shaped triangle, are also noticeable on the photographic version of chart LAC 26 (page 52) in The Clementine Atlas of the Moon (Ben Bussey / Paul D. Spudis).

== Satellite craters ==
By convention these features are identified on lunar maps by placing the letter on the side of the crater midpoint that is closest to Daniell.

Daniell	Latitude	Longitude	Diameter
D	37.0° N	25.8° E	6 km
W	35.9° N	31.5° E	3 km
X	36.6° N	31.8° E	5 km
