= Observational astronomy =

Division of astronomy & physics

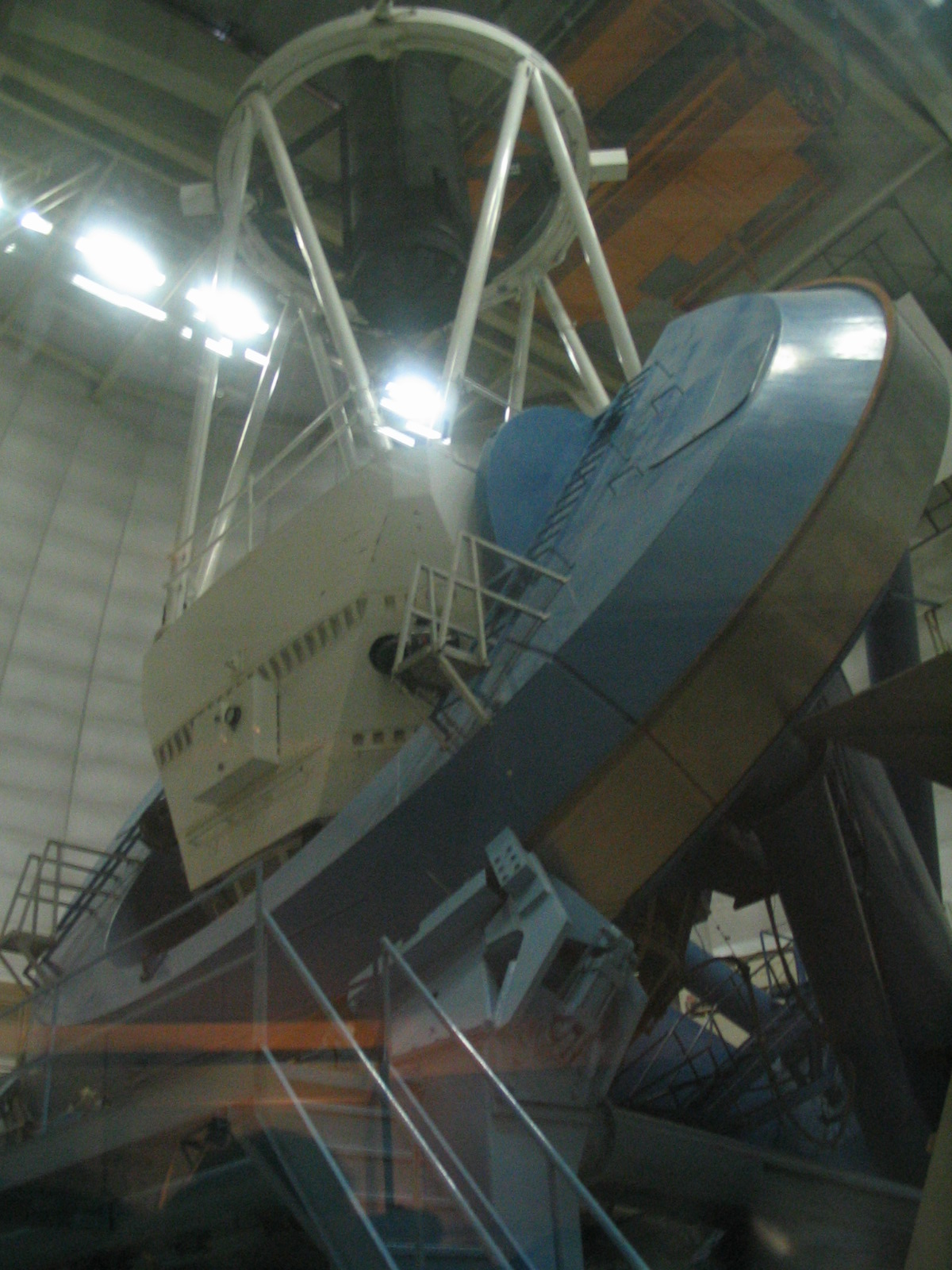
Mayall telescope at Kitt Peak National Observatory

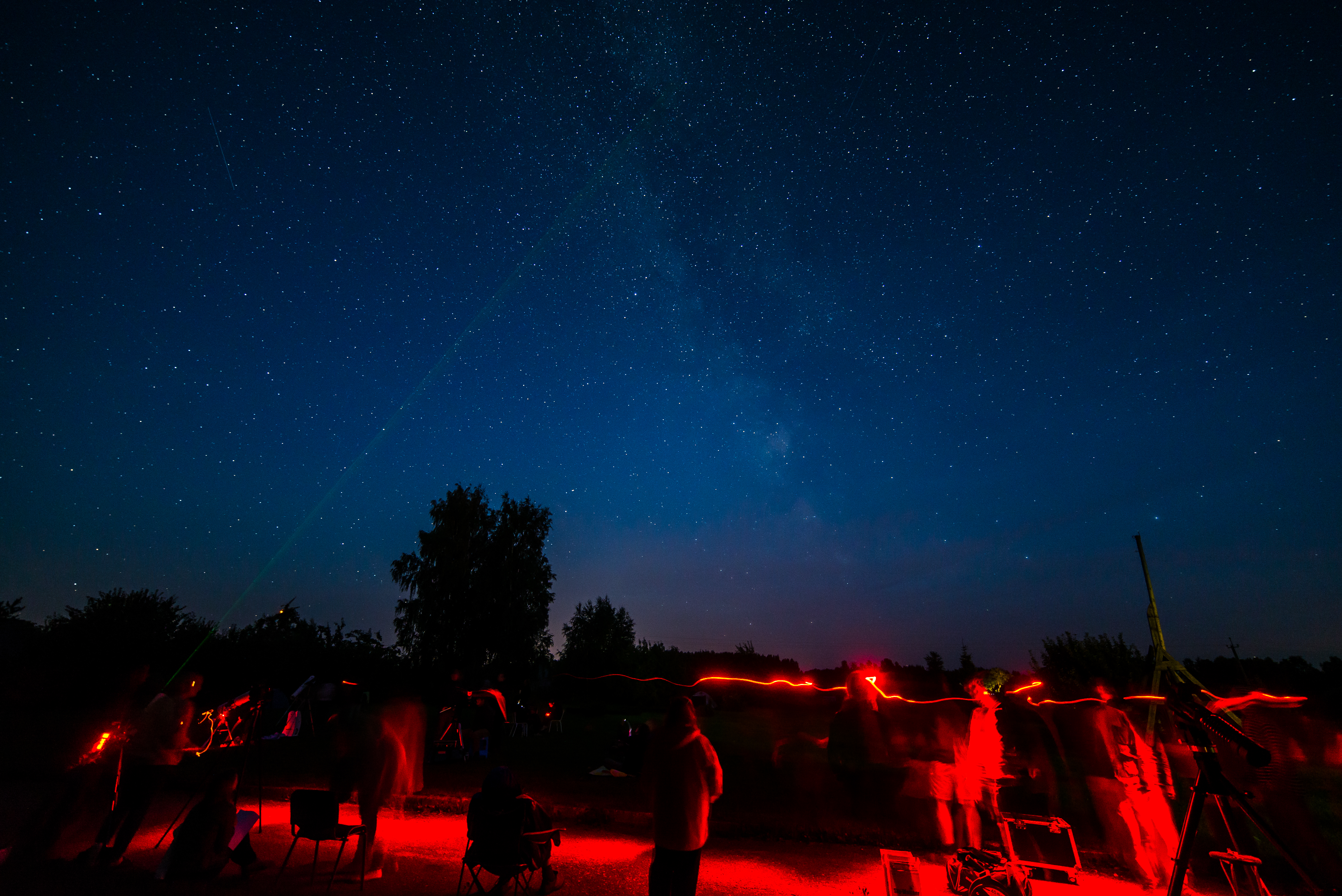
An assembly in Estonia to observe meteors

Observational astronomy is a division of astronomy that is concerned with recording data about the observable universe, the practice and study of observing celestial objects with the use of telescopes and other astronomical instruments.

As a science, the study of astronomy does not rely on direct experiments with the objects in a distant universe. Rather astronomers have a vast number of visible examples of stellar phenomena that can be examined. This allows for observational data to be plotted on graphs, and general trends recorded. Nearby examples of specific phenomena, such as variable stars, can then be used to infer the behavior of more distant representatives. Those distant yardsticks can then be employed to measure other phenomena in that neighborhood, including the distance to a galaxy.

Galileo Galilei turned a telescope to the heavens and recorded what he saw. Since that time, observational astronomy has made steady advances with each improvement in telescope technology.

== Subdivisions ==
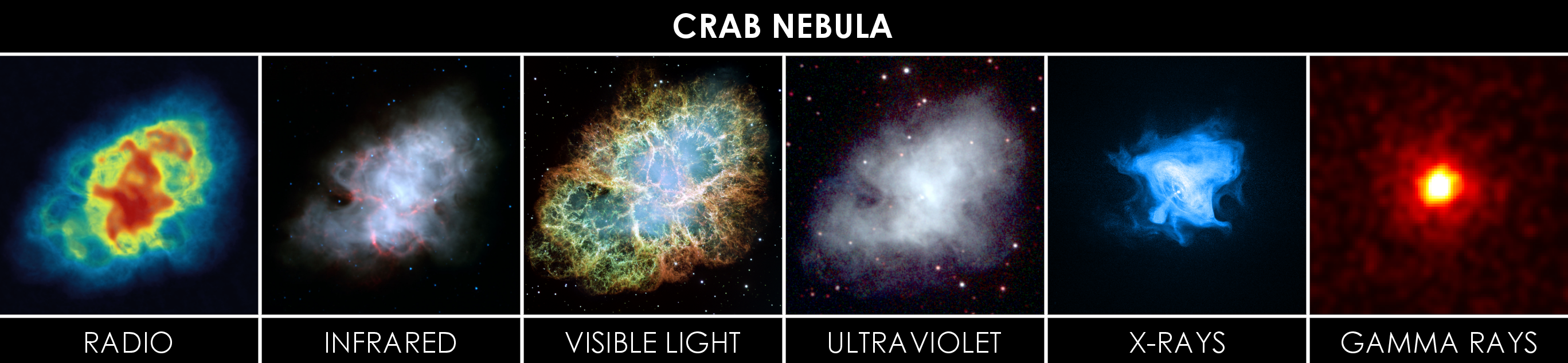
The Crab Nebula as seen in various wavelengths

Overview of types of observational astronomy by observed wavelengths and their observability.

A traditional division of observational astronomy is based on the region of the electromagnetic spectrum observed:

- Radio astronomy detects radiation of millimetre to decametre wavelength. The receivers are similar to those used in radio broadcast transmission but much more sensitive. See also Radio telescopes.
- Infrared astronomy deals with the detection and analysis of infrared radiation (this typically refers to wavelengths longer than the detection limit of silicon solid-state detectors, about 1 μm wavelength). The most common tool is the reflecting telescope, but with a detector sensitive to infrared wavelengths. Space telescopes are used at certain wavelengths where the atmosphere is opaque, or to eliminate noise (thermal radiation from the atmosphere). See also Infrared telescopes.
- Optical astronomy is the part of astronomy that uses optical instruments (mirrors, lenses, and solid-state detectors) to observe light from near-infrared to near-ultraviolet wavelengths. Visible-light astronomy, using wavelengths detectable with the human eyes (about 400–700 nm), falls in the middle of this spectrum. See also Optical Telescopes.
- High-energy astronomy includes X-ray astronomy, gamma-ray astronomy, and extreme UV astronomy.

=== Methods ===
In addition to using electromagnetic radiation, modern astrophysicists can also make observations using neutrinos, cosmic rays or gravitational waves. Observing a source using multiple methods is known as multi-messenger astronomy.

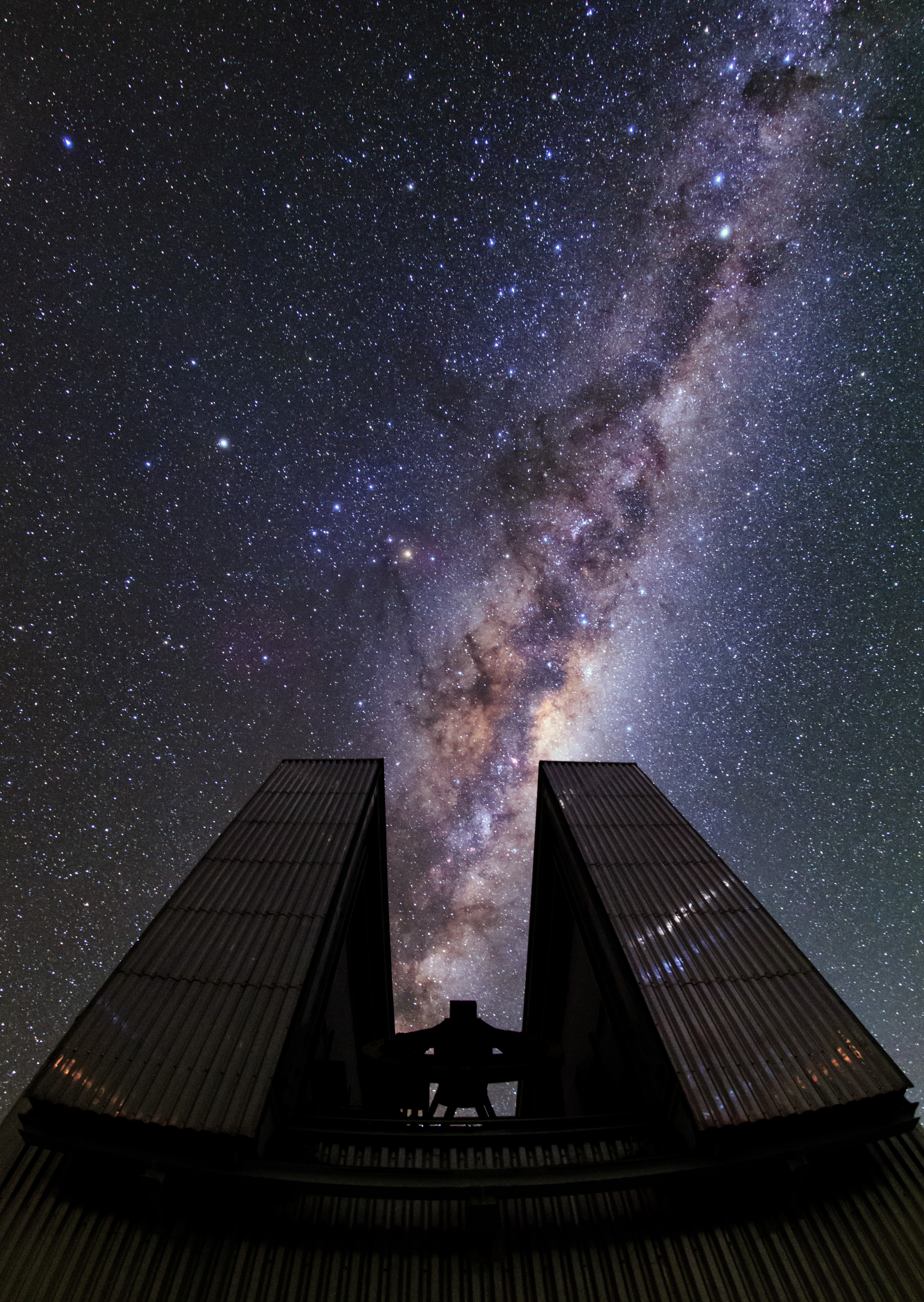
Ultra HD photography taken at La Silla Observatory

Optical and radio astronomy can be performed with ground-based observatories, because the atmosphere is relatively transparent at the wavelengths being detected. Observatories are usually located at high altitudes so as to minimise the absorption and distortion caused by the Earth's atmosphere. Some wavelengths of infrared light are heavily absorbed by water vapor, so many infrared observatories are located in dry places at high altitude, or in space.

The atmosphere is opaque at the wavelengths used by X-ray astronomy, gamma-ray astronomy, UV astronomy and (except for a few wavelength "windows") far infrared astronomy, so observations must be carried out mostly from balloons or space observatories. Powerful gamma rays can, however be detected by the large air showers they produce, and the study of cosmic rays is a rapidly expanding branch of astronomy.

Occultation is the observation of the instant one celestial object occults or eclipses another. Multi-chord asteroid occultation observations measure the profile of the asteroid to the kilometre level.

=== Important factors ===
For much of the history of observational astronomy, almost all observation was performed in the visual spectrum with optical telescopes. While the Earth's atmosphere is relatively transparent in this portion of the electromagnetic spectrum, most telescope work is still dependent on seeing conditions and air transparency, and is generally restricted to the night time. The seeing conditions depend on the turbulence and thermal variations in the air. Locations that are frequently cloudy or suffer from atmospheric turbulence limit the resolution of observations. Likewise the presence of the full Moon can brighten up the sky with scattered light, hindering observation of faint objects.

For observation purposes, the optimal location for an optical telescope is undoubtedly in outer space. There the telescope can make observations without being affected by the atmosphere. However, at present it remains costly to lift telescopes into orbit. Thus the next best locations are certain mountain peaks that have a high number of cloudless days and generally possess good atmospheric conditions (with good seeing conditions). The peaks of the islands of Mauna Kea, Hawaii and La Palma possess these properties, as to a lesser extent do inland sites such as Llano de Chajnantor, Paranal, Cerro Tololo and La Silla in Chile. These observatory locations have attracted an assemblage of powerful telescopes, totalling many billion US dollars of investment.

The darkness of the night sky is an important factor in optical astronomy. With the size of cities and human populated areas ever expanding, the amount of artificial light at night has also increased. These artificial lights produce a diffuse background illumination that makes observation of faint astronomical features very difficult without special filters. In a few locations such as the state of Arizona and in the United Kingdom, this has led to campaigns for the reduction of light pollution. The use of hoods around street lights not only improves the amount of light directed toward the ground, but also helps reduce the light directed toward the sky.

Atmospheric effects (astronomical seeing) can severely hinder the resolution of a telescope. Without some means of correcting for the blurring effect of the shifting atmosphere, telescopes larger than about 15–20 cm in aperture can not achieve their theoretical resolution at visible wavelengths. As a result, the primary benefit of using very large telescopes has been the improved light-gathering capability, allowing very faint magnitudes to be observed. However the resolution handicap has begun to be overcome by adaptive optics, speckle imaging and interferometric imaging, as well as the use of space telescopes.

=== Measuring results ===
Astronomers have a number of observational tools that they can use to make measurements of the heavens. For objects that are relatively close to the Sun and Earth, direct and very precise position measurements can be made against a more distant (and thereby nearly stationary) background. Early observations of this nature were used to develop very precise orbital models of the various planets, and to determine their respective masses and gravitational perturbations. Such measurements led to the discovery of the planets Uranus, Neptune, and (indirectly) Pluto. They also resulted in an erroneous assumption of a fictional planet Vulcan within the orbit of Mercury (but the explanation of the precession of Mercury's orbit by Einstein is considered one of the triumphs of his general relativity theory).

== Developments and diversity ==
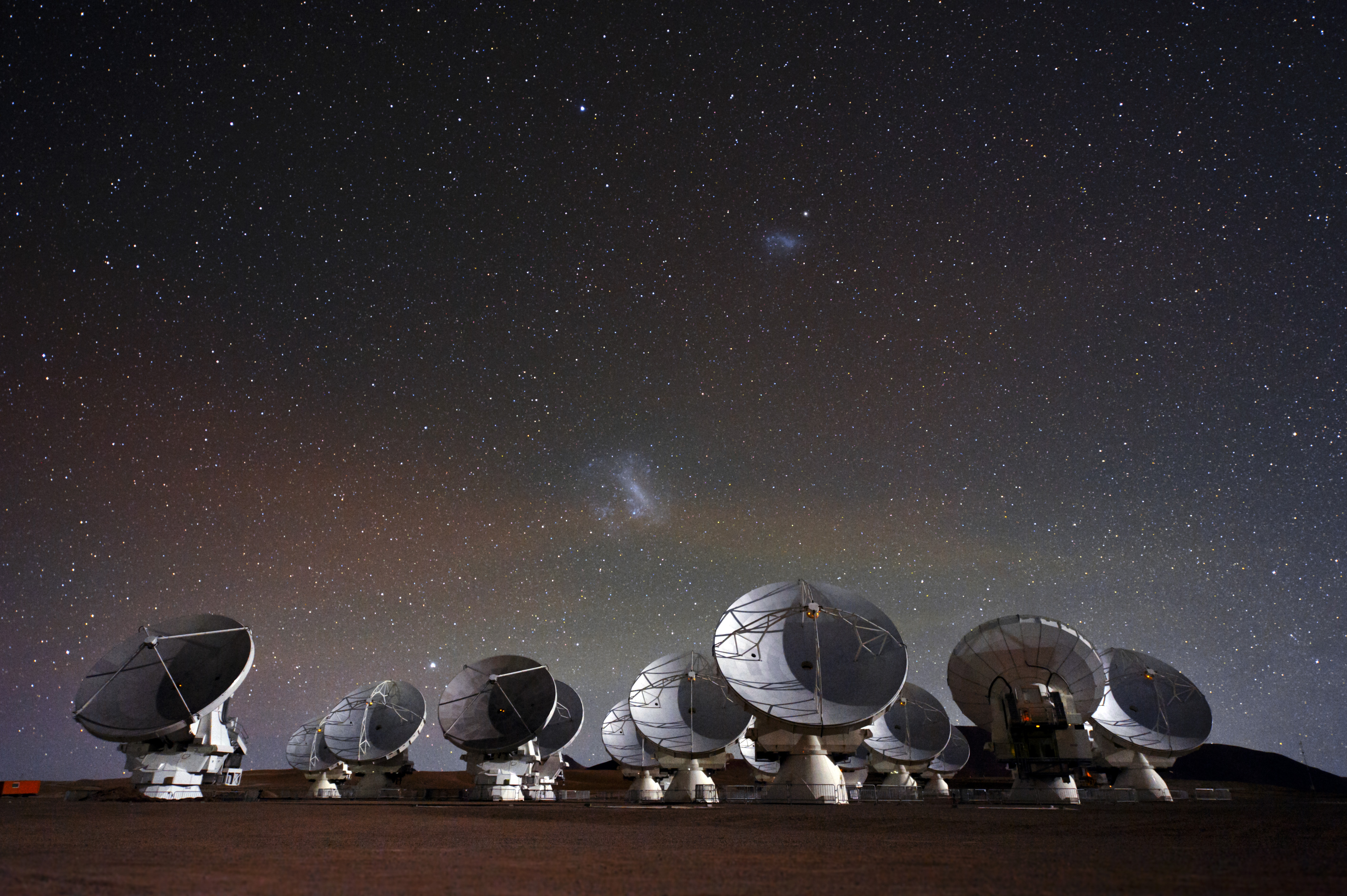
ALMA is the world's most powerful telescope for studying the Universe at submillimeter and millimeter wavelengths.

In addition to examination of the universe in the optical spectrum, astronomers have increasingly been able to acquire information in other portions of the electromagnetic spectrum. The earliest such non-optical measurements were made of the thermal properties of the Sun. Instruments employed during a solar eclipse could be used to measure the radiation from the corona.

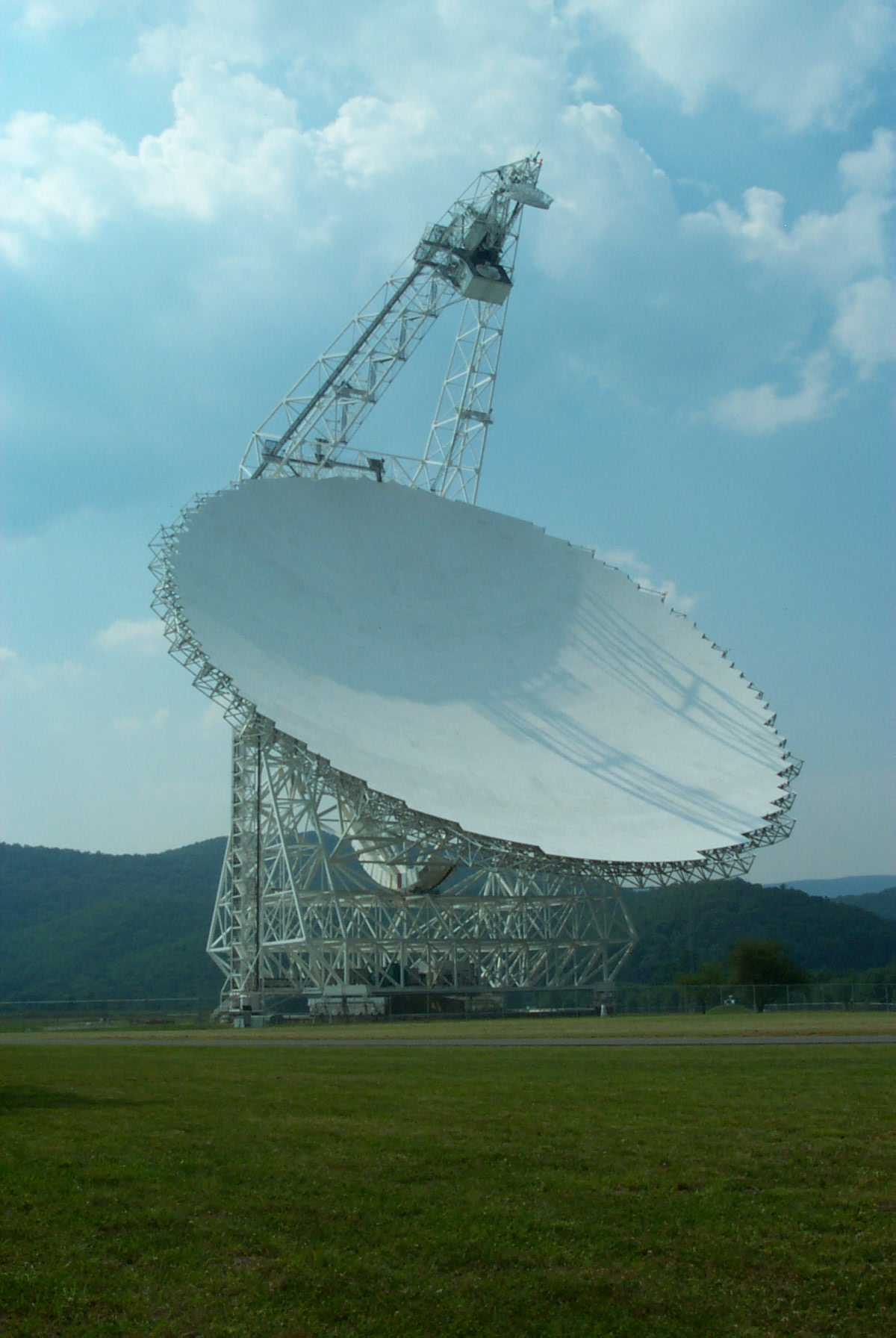
Fully-steerable radio telescope in Green Bank, West Virginia

=== Radio astronomy ===
With the discovery of radio waves, radio astronomy began to emerge as a new discipline in astronomy. The long wavelengths of radio waves required much larger collecting dishes in order to make images with good resolution, and later led to the development of the multi-dish interferometer for making high-resolution aperture synthesis radio images (or "radio maps"). The development of the microwave horn receiver led to the discovery of the microwave background radiation associated with the Big Bang.

Radio astronomy has continued to expand its capabilities, even using radio astronomy satellites to produce interferometers with baselines much larger than the size of the Earth. However, the ever-expanding use of the radio spectrum for other uses is gradually drowning out the faint radio signals from the stars. For this reason, in the future radio astronomy might be performed from shielded locations, such as the far side of the Moon.

=== Late 20th-century developments ===
The last part of the twentieth century saw rapid technological advances in astronomical instrumentation. Optical telescopes were growing ever larger, and employing adaptive optics to partly negate atmospheric blurring. New telescopes were launched into space, and began observing the universe in the infrared, ultraviolet, x-ray, and gamma ray parts of the electromagnetic spectrum, as well as observing cosmic rays. Interferometer arrays produced the first extremely high-resolution images using aperture synthesis at radio, infrared and optical wavelengths. Orbiting instruments such as the Hubble Space Telescope produced rapid advances in astronomical knowledge, acting as the workhorse for visible-light observations of faint objects. New space instruments under development are expected to directly observe planets around other stars, perhaps even some Earth-like worlds.

In addition to telescopes, astronomers have begun using other instruments to make observations.

=== Other instruments ===
Neutrino astronomy is the branch of astronomy that observes astronomical objects with neutrino detectors in special observatories, usually huge underground tanks. Nuclear reactions in stars and supernova explosions produce very large numbers of neutrinos, very few of which may be detected by a neutrino telescope. Neutrino astronomy is motivated by the possibility of observing processes that are inaccessible to optical telescopes, such as the Sun's core.

Gravitational-wave observatories, such as LIGO, use detectors that can measure gravitational waves, which are small perturbations in spacetime formed during certain events, such as collisions of massive objects like neutron stars or black holes.

Robotic spacecraft are also being increasingly used to make highly detailed observations of planets within the Solar System, so that the field of planetary science now has significant cross-over with the disciplines of geology and meteorology.

== Observation tools ==
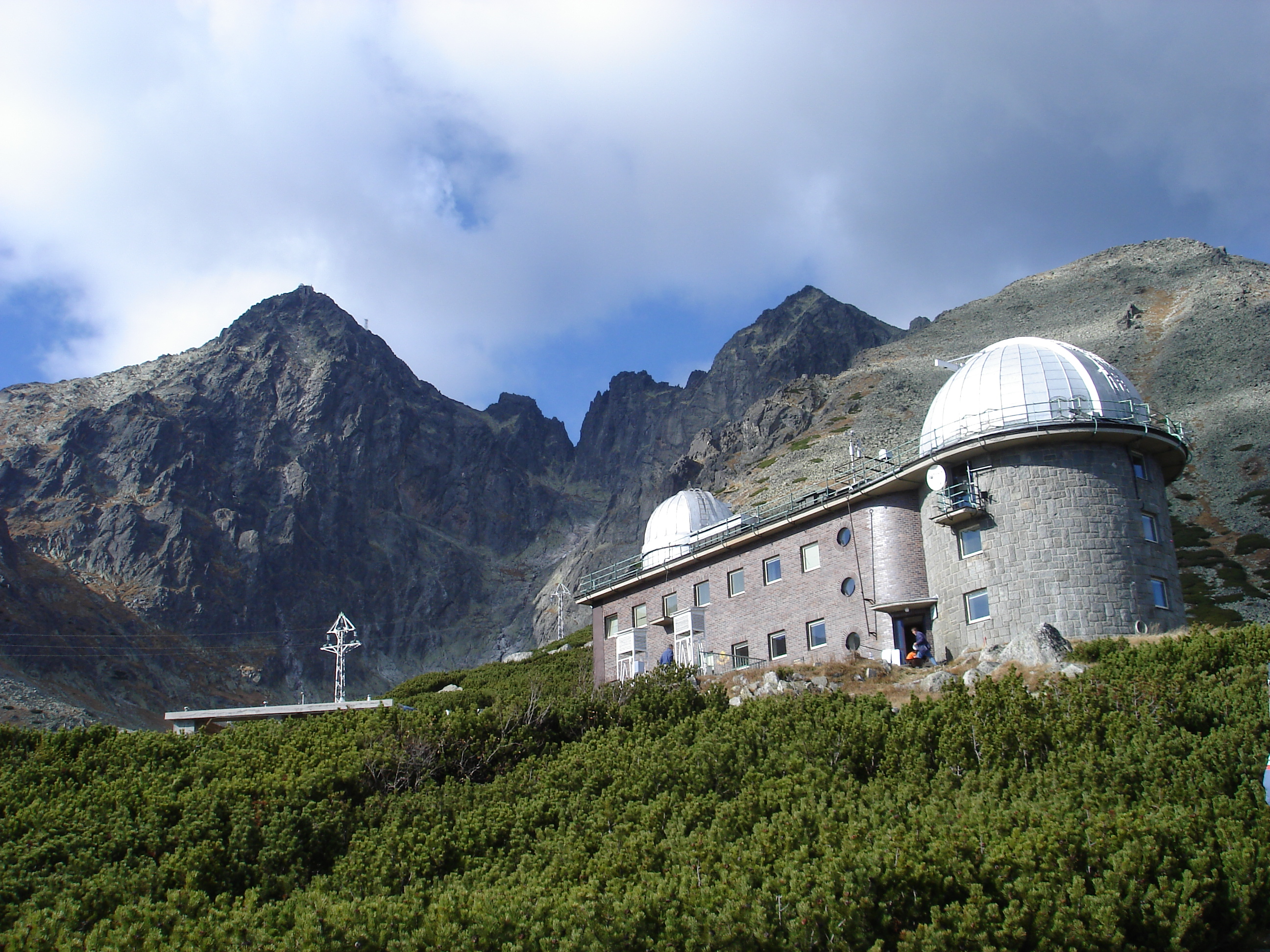
Skalnaté pleso observatory, Slovakia

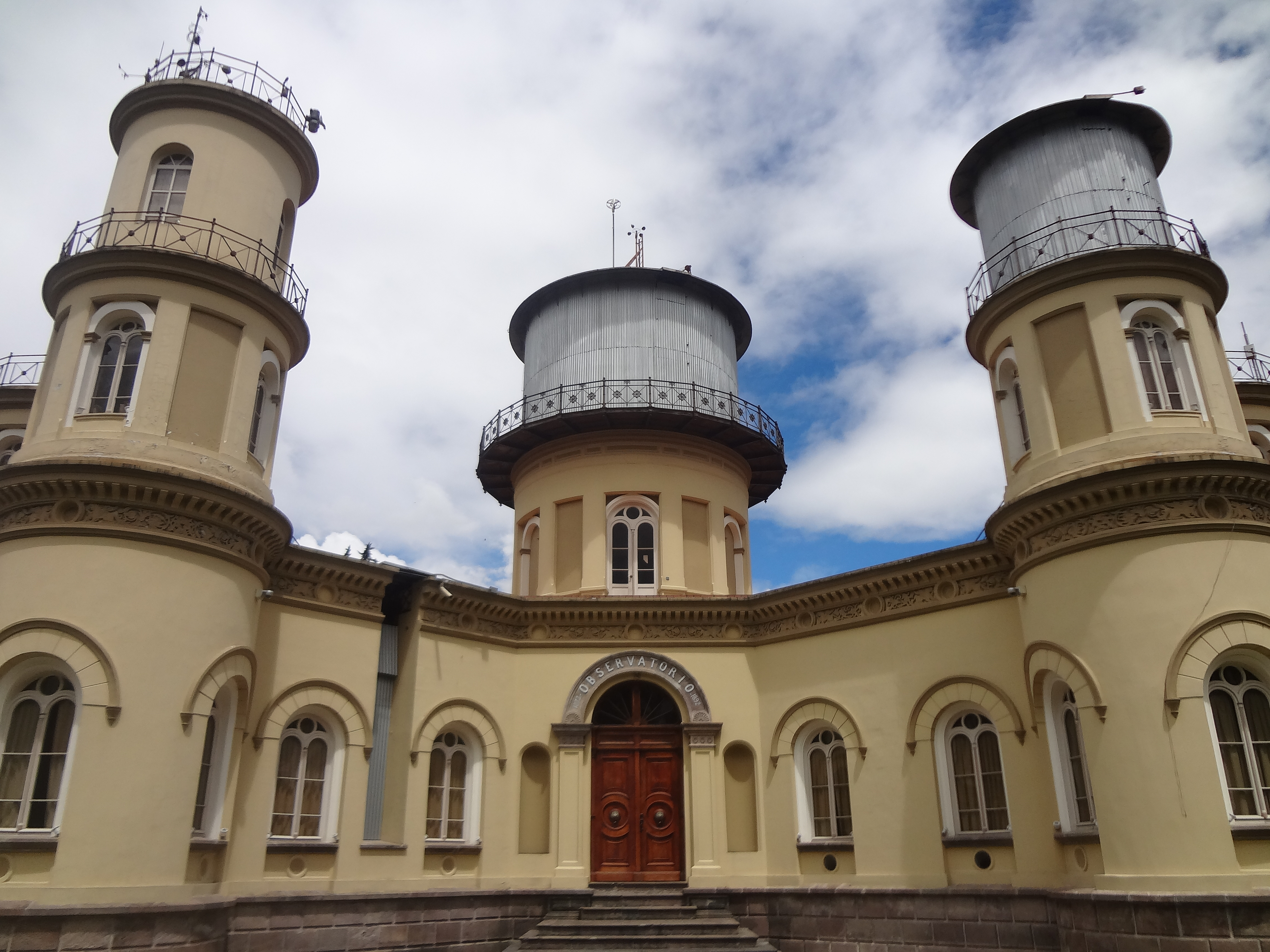
One of the Oldest Observatories in South America is the Quito Astronomical Observatory, founded in 1873 and located 12 minutes south of the Equator in Quito, Ecuador. The Quito Astronomical Observatory is the National Observatory of Ecuador and is located in the Historic Center of Quito and is managed by the National Polytechnic School.

=== Telescopes ===
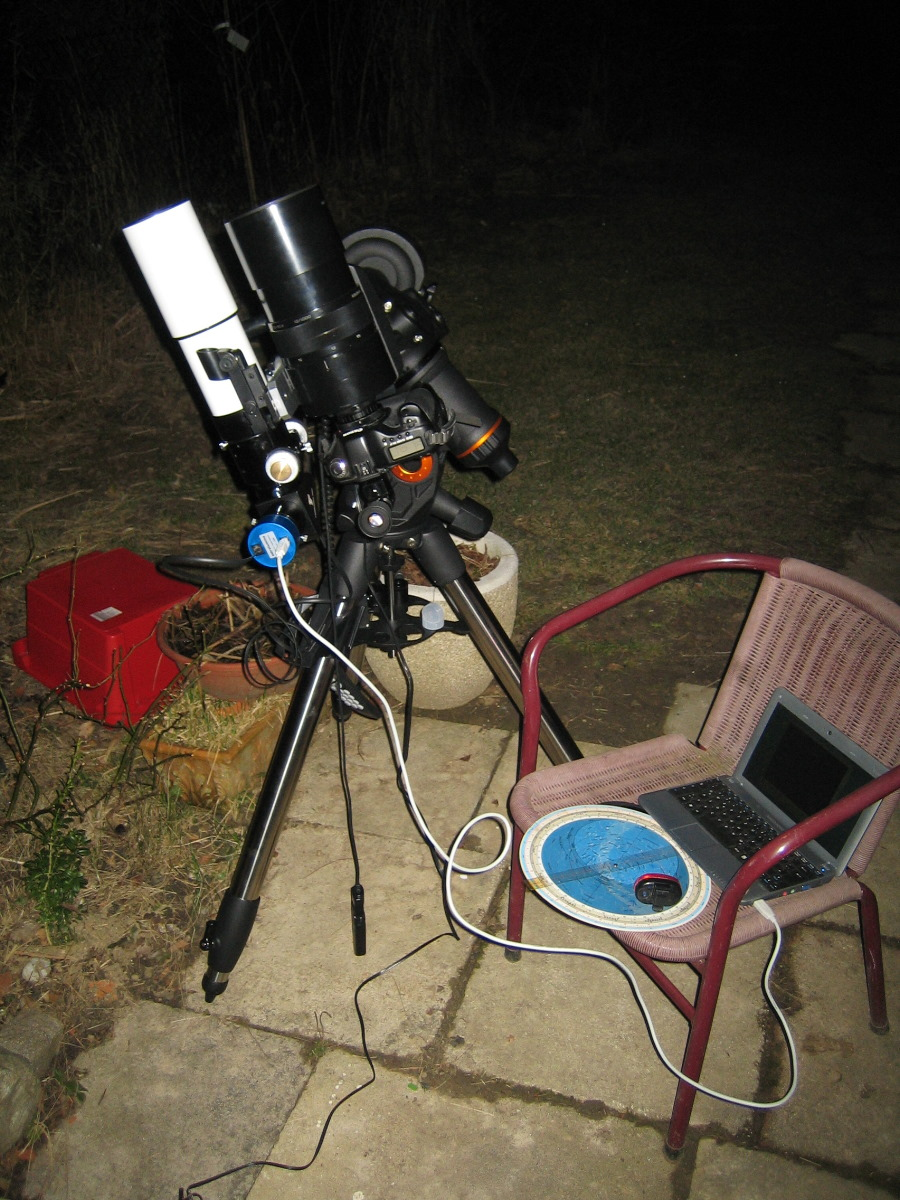
An amateur astrophotography setup with an automated guide system connected to a laptop

The key instrument of nearly all modern observational astronomy is the telescope. This serves the dual purposes of gathering more light so that very faint objects can be observed, and magnifying the image so that small and distant objects can be observed. Optical astronomy requires telescopes that use optical components of great precision. Typical requirements for grinding and polishing a curved mirror, for example, require the surface to be within a fraction of a wavelength of light of a particular conic shape. Many modern "telescopes" actually consist of arrays of telescopes working together to provide higher resolution through aperture synthesis.

Large telescopes are housed in domes, both to protect them from the weather and to stabilize the environmental conditions. For example, if the temperature is different from one side of the telescope to the other, the shape of the structure changes, due to thermal expansion pushing optical elements out of position. This can affect the image. For this reason, the domes are usually bright white (titanium dioxide) or unpainted metal. Domes are often opened around sunset, long before observing can begin, so that air can circulate and bring the entire telescope to the same temperature as the surroundings. To prevent wind-buffet or other vibrations affecting observations, it is standard practice to mount the telescope on a concrete pier whose foundations are entirely separate from those of the surrounding dome and building.

To do almost any scientific work requires that telescopes track objects as they wheel across the visible sky. In other words, they must smoothly compensate for the rotation of the Earth. Until the advent of computer controlled drive mechanisms, the standard solution was some form of equatorial mount, and for small telescopes this is still the norm. However, this is a structurally poor design and becomes more and more cumbersome as the diameter and weight of the telescope increases. The world's largest equatorial mounted telescope is the 200 inch (5.1 m) Hale Telescope, whereas recent 8–10 m telescopes use the structurally better altazimuth mount, and are actually physically smaller than the Hale, despite the larger mirrors. As of 2006, there are design projects underway for gigantic alt-az telescopes: the Thirty Metre Telescope , and the 100 m diameter Overwhelmingly Large Telescope.

Amateur astronomers use such instruments as the Newtonian reflector, the Refractor and the increasingly popular Maksutov telescope.

=== Photography ===
The photograph has served a critical role in observational astronomy for over a century, but in the last 30 years it has been largely replaced for imaging applications by digital sensors such as CCDs and CMOS chips. Specialist areas of astronomy such as photometry and interferometry have utilised electronic detectors for a much longer period of time. Astrophotography uses specialised photographic film (or usually a glass plate coated with photographic emulsion), but there are a number of drawbacks, particularly a low quantum efficiency, of the order of 3%, whereas CCDs can be tuned for a QE >90% in a narrow band. Almost all modern telescope instruments are electronic arrays, and older telescopes have been either been retrofitted with these instruments or closed down. Glass plates are still used in some applications, such as surveying, because the resolution possible with a chemical film is much higher than any electronic detector yet constructed.

==== Advantages ====
Prior to the invention of photography, all astronomy was done with the naked eye. However, even before films became sensitive enough, scientific astronomy moved entirely to film, because of the overwhelming advantages:

- The human eye discards what it sees from split-second to split-second, but photographic film gathers more and more light for as long as the shutter is open.
- The resulting image is permanent, so many astronomers can use the same data.
- It is possible to see objects as they change over time (SN 1987A is a spectacular example).

==== Blink comparator ====
The blink comparator is an instrument that is used to compare two nearly identical photographs made of the same section of sky at different points in time. The comparator alternates illumination of the two plates, and any changes are revealed by blinking points or streaks. This instrument has been used to find asteroids, comets, and variable stars.

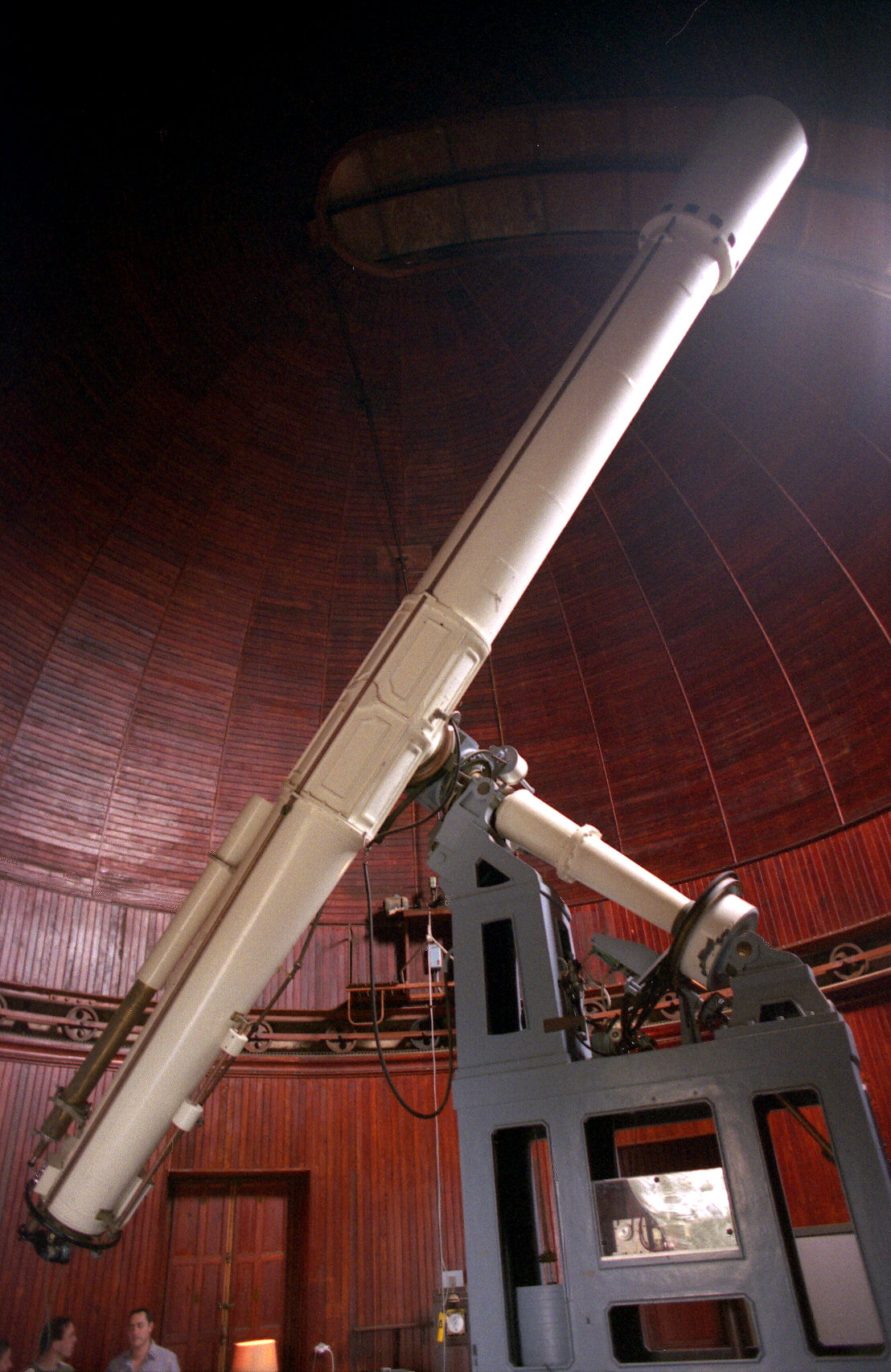
50 cm refracting telescope at Nice Observatory

=== Micrometer ===
The position or cross-wire micrometer is an implement that has been used to measure double stars. This consists of a pair of fine, movable lines that can be moved together or apart. The telescope lens is lined up on the pair and oriented using position wires that lie at right angles to the star separation. The movable wires are then adjusted to match the two star positions. The separation of the stars is then read off the instrument, and their true separation determined based on the magnification of the instrument.

=== Spectrograph ===
A vital instrument of observational astronomy is the spectrograph. The absorption of specific wavelengths of light by elements allows specific properties of distant bodies to be observed. This capability has resulted in the discovery of the element of helium in the Sun's emission spectrum, and has allowed astronomers to determine a great deal of information concerning distant stars, galaxies, and other celestial bodies. Doppler shift (particularly "redshift") of spectra can also be used to determine the radial motion or distance with respect to the Earth.

Early spectrographs employed banks of prisms that split light into a broad spectrum. Later the grating spectrograph was developed, which reduced the amount of light loss compared to prisms and provided higher spectral resolution. The spectrum can be photographed in a long exposure, allowing the spectrum of faint objects (such as distant galaxies) to be measured.

Stellar photometry came into use in 1861 as a means of measuring stellar colors. This technique measured the magnitude of a star at specific frequency ranges, allowing a determination of the overall color, and therefore temperature of a star. By 1951 an internationally standardized system of UBV-magnitudes (Ultraviolet-Blue-Visual) was adopted.

=== Photoelectric photometry ===
Photoelectric photometry using the CCD is now frequently used to make observations through a telescope. These sensitive instruments can record the image nearly down to the level of individual photons, and can be designed to view in parts of the spectrum that are invisible to the eye. The ability to record the arrival of small numbers of photons over a period of time can allow a degree of computer correction for atmospheric effects, sharpening up the image. Multiple digital images can also be combined to further enhance the image, often known as "stacking". When combined with the adaptive optics technology, image quality can approach the theoretical resolution capability of the telescope.

Filters are used to view an object at particular frequencies or frequency ranges. Multilayer film filters can provide very precise control of the frequencies transmitted and blocked, so that, for example, objects can be viewed at a particular frequency emitted only by excited hydrogen atoms. Filters can also be used to partially compensate for the effects of light pollution by blocking out unwanted light. Polarization filters can also be used to determine if a source is emitting polarized light, and the orientation of the polarization.

== Observing ==
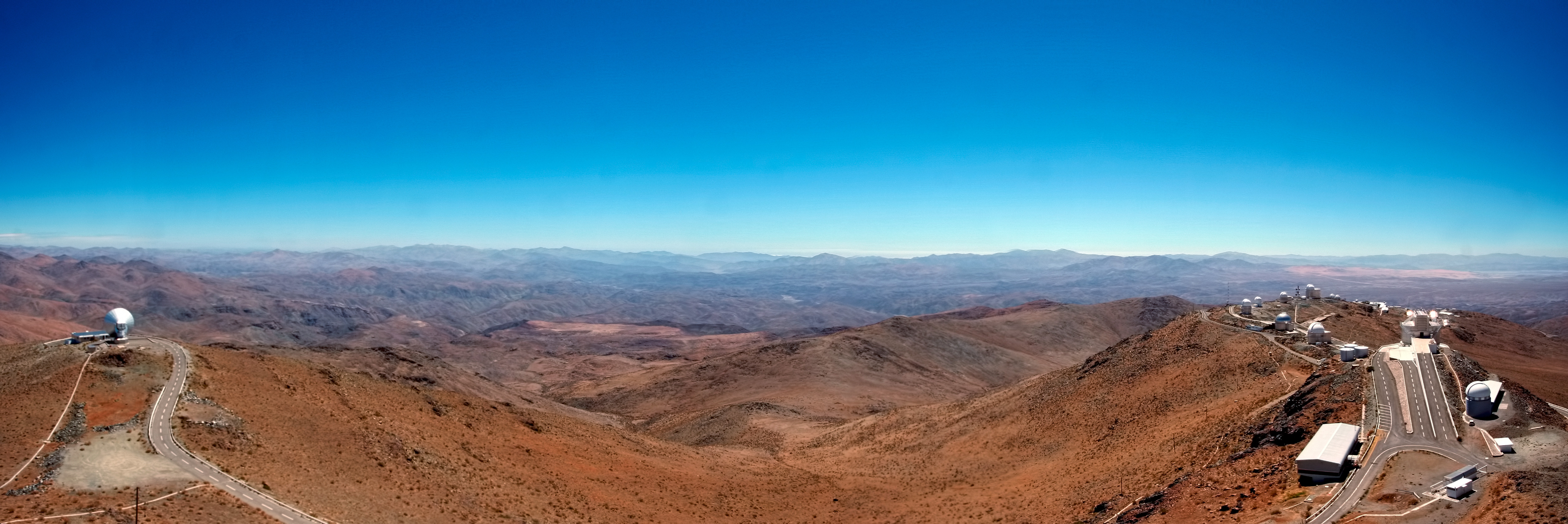
The main platform at La Silla hosts a huge range of telescopes with which astronomers can explore the Universe.

Astronomers observe a wide range of astronomical sources, including high-redshift galaxies, AGNs, the afterglow from the Big Bang, and many different types of stars and protostars.

A variety of data can be observed for each object. The position coordinates locate the object in the sky using the techniques of spherical astronomy, and the magnitude determines its brightness as seen from the Earth. The relative brightness in different parts of the spectrum yields information about the temperature and physics of the object. Photographs of the spectra allow the chemistry of the object to be examined.

Parallax shifts of a star against the background can be used to determine the distance, up to a limit imposed by the resolution of the instrument. The radial velocity of the star and changes in its position over time (proper motion) can be used to measure its velocity relative to the Sun. Variations in the brightness of the star give evidence of instabilities in the star's atmosphere, or else the presence of an occulting companion. The orbits of binary stars can be used to measure the relative masses of each companion, or the total mass of the system. Spectroscopic binaries can be found by observing Doppler shifts in the spectrum of the star and its close companion.

Stars of identical masses that formed at the same time and under similar conditions typically have nearly identical observed properties. Observing a mass of closely associated stars, such as in a globular cluster, allows data to be assembled about the distribution of stellar types. These tables can then be used to infer the age of the association.

For distant galaxies and AGNs, observations are made of the overall shape and properties of the galaxy, as well as the groupings where they are found. Observations of certain types of variable stars and supernovae of known luminosity, called standard candles, in other galaxies allow the inference of the distance to the host galaxy. The expansion of space causes the spectra of these galaxies to be shifted, depending on the distance, and modified by the Doppler effect of the galaxy's radial velocity. Both the size of the galaxy and its redshift can be used to infer something about the distance of the galaxy. Observations of large numbers of galaxies are referred to as redshift surveys, and are used to model the evolution of galaxy forms.

== See also ==
- Lunar observation
- Observational study
- Observatory
- Space telescope
- Timeline of telescopes, observatories, and observing technology

== Related lists ==
- List of astronomical observatories
- List of radio telescopes
