= Schroter's Valley =

Rille on the Moon

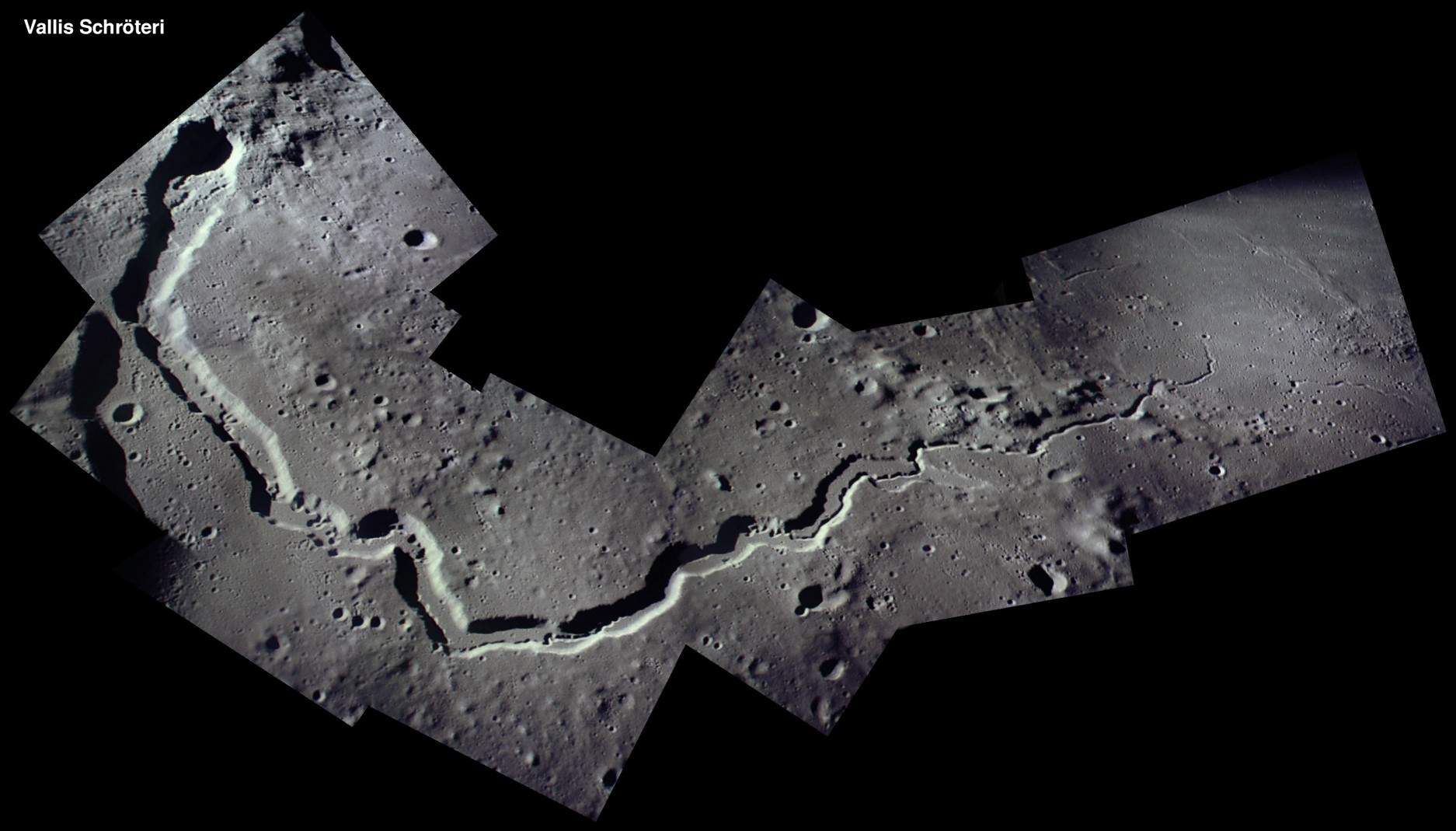
Rille on the valley floor, photographic mosaic from Apollo 15

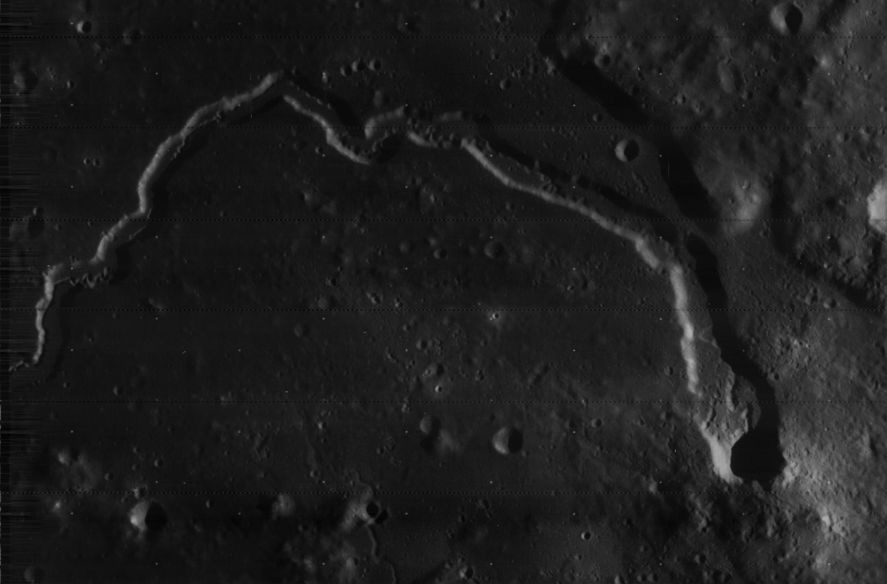
Lunar Orbiter 4 image (north at top)

Schroter's Valley, frequently known by the Latinized name Vallis Schröteri, is a sinuous valley or rille on the surface of the near side of the Moon. It is located on a rise of continental ground, sometimes called the Aristarchus plateau, that is surrounded by the Oceanus Procellarum to the south and west and the Mare Imbrium to the northwest. At the southern edge of this rise are the craters Aristarchus and Herodotus. The rille has been the subject of numerous transient lunar phenomena observations. The selenographic coordinates of this valley are 26.2°N 50.8°W, and it has a maximum diameter of 168 km. It is named for Johannes H. Schröter.

== Description ==
This is the largest sinuous rille on the Moon. It begins at a 6 km diameter crater located 25 km to the north of Herodotus. (The start of the rille has been termed the "Cobra's Head" by some observers, due to its resemblance to a snake.) From the crater it follows a meandering path, first to the north, then setting a course toward the northwest, before finally bending back to the south until it reaches a 1 km high precipice at the edge of the Oceanus Procellarum. The rille has a maximum width of about 10 km, then gradually narrows to less than a kilometer near its terminus. The origins of this rille are believed to be volcanic. The interior floor has been resurfaced and is very level. However, there is a slender inner rille located on the floor, which can be photographed from Earth with a good telescope and good seeing.

== Exploration ==
Vallis Schröteri was a potential landing site for the canceled Apollo 18 mission.

In April 2020, Intuitive Machines announced that Vallis Schröteri would be the target site of its first lunar landing attempt in October 2021. The company was awarded a $77 million Commercial Lunar Payload Services (CLPS) contract in May 2019 to land science payloads on the Moon for NASA. The robotic Nova C lander will be launched on a SpaceX Falcon 9 rocket. By April 2021, however, the landing site had been changed to a location between Mare Serenitatis and Mare Crisium instead.
