= Posidonius (crater) =

Lunar impact crater

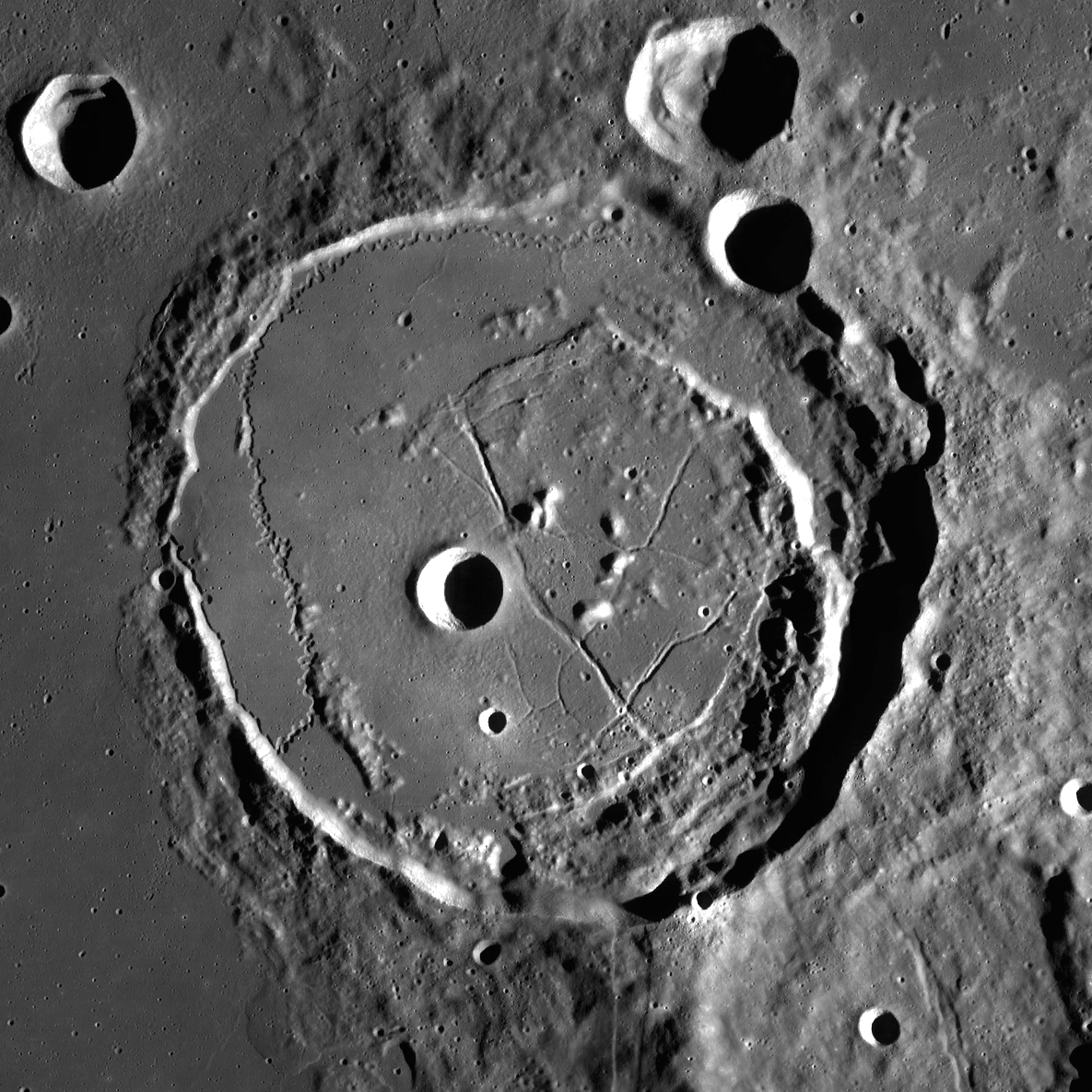
- Mosaic of Lunar Reconnaissance Orbiter images
- Coordinates: 31.88°N 29.99°E
- Diameter: 95 km
- Depth: 1.37 km
- Colongitude: 343° at sunrise
- Formation: Upper Imbrian
- Eponym: Posidonius

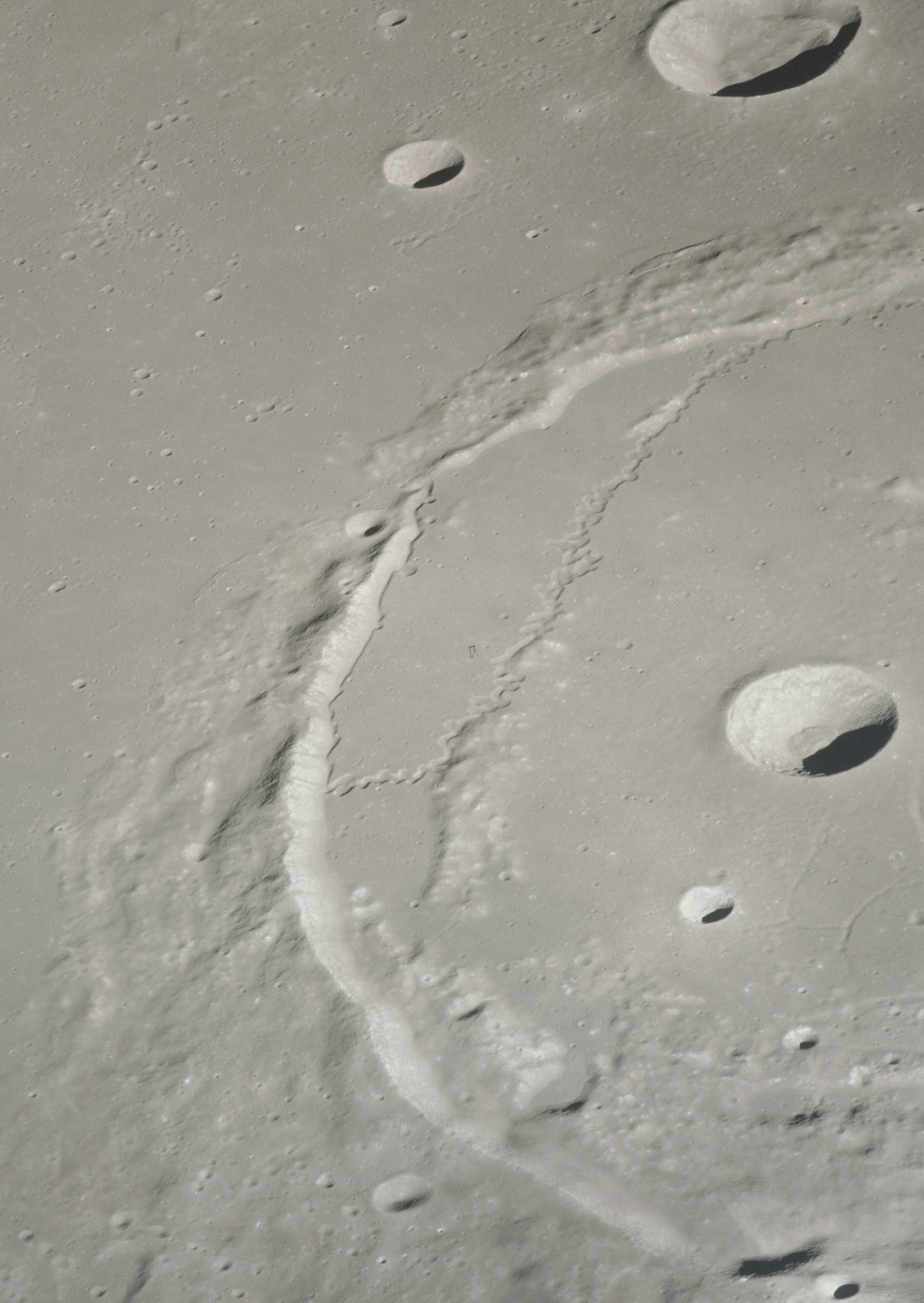
Oblique view of Posidonius from Apollo 15. A tightly convoluted sinuous rille crosses the raised floor of the crater, turns back, and follows the rim to a low point in the western rim.

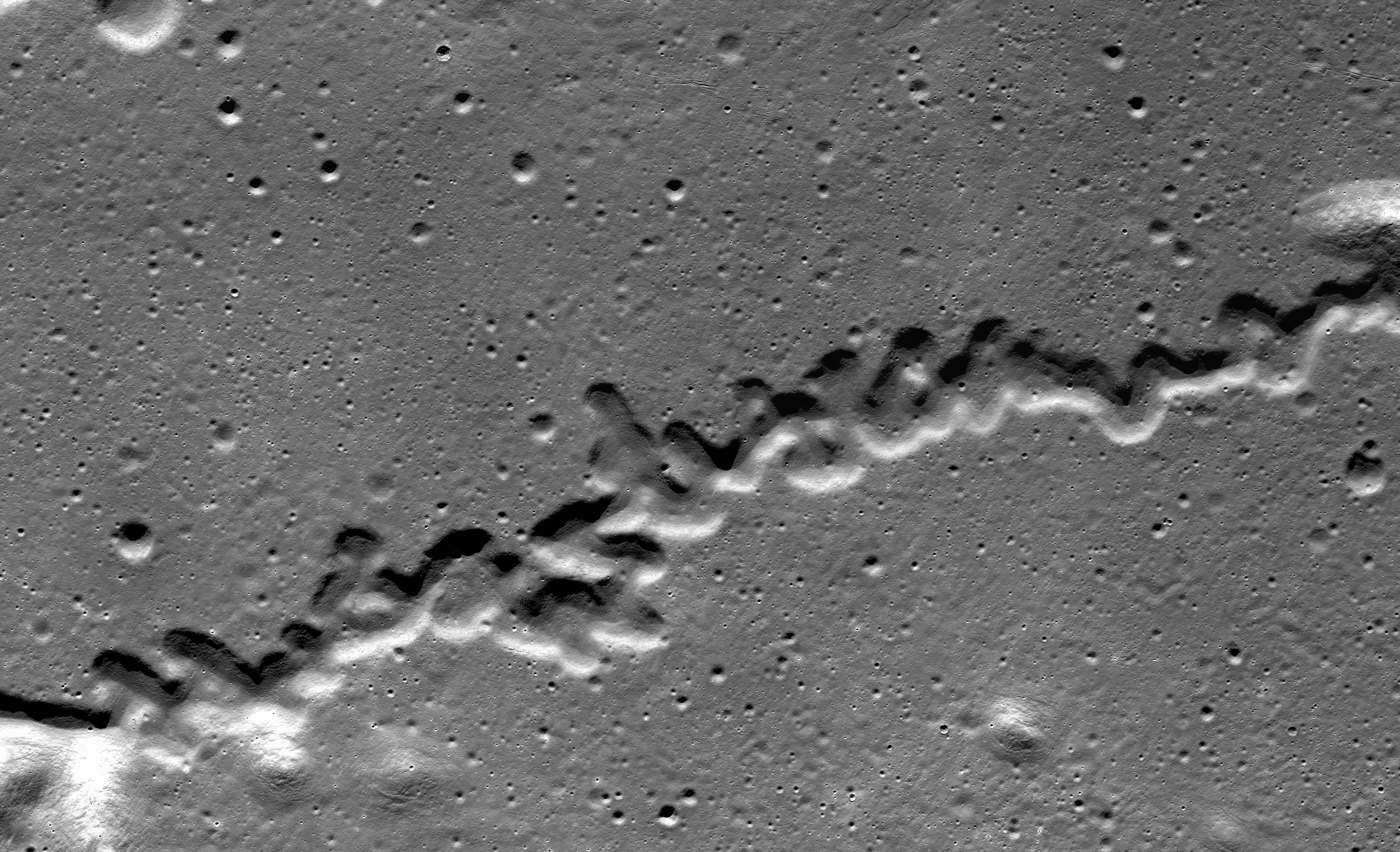
Part of the sinuous rille in Posidonius (LRO image).

Posidonius is a lunar impact crater that is located on the north-eastern edge of Mare Serenitatis, to the south of Lacus Somniorum. T. W. Webb described it as a "walled plain" that is "a good object about 6^{d} after" a new Moon. It was named after ancient Greek philosopher and geographer Posidonius of Apamea. The crater Chacornac is attached to the southeast rim, and to the north is Daniell.

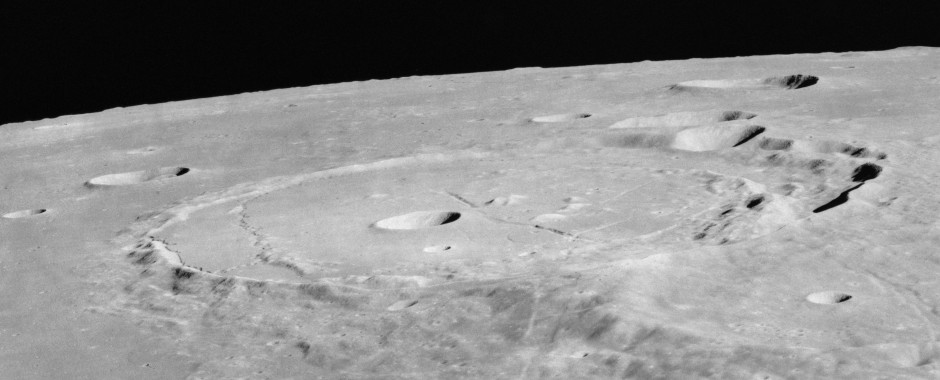
Oblique view of Posidonius from Apollo 17. Note that the lava which flooded the crater reached its rim and is clearly above the mare plain to the west (left).

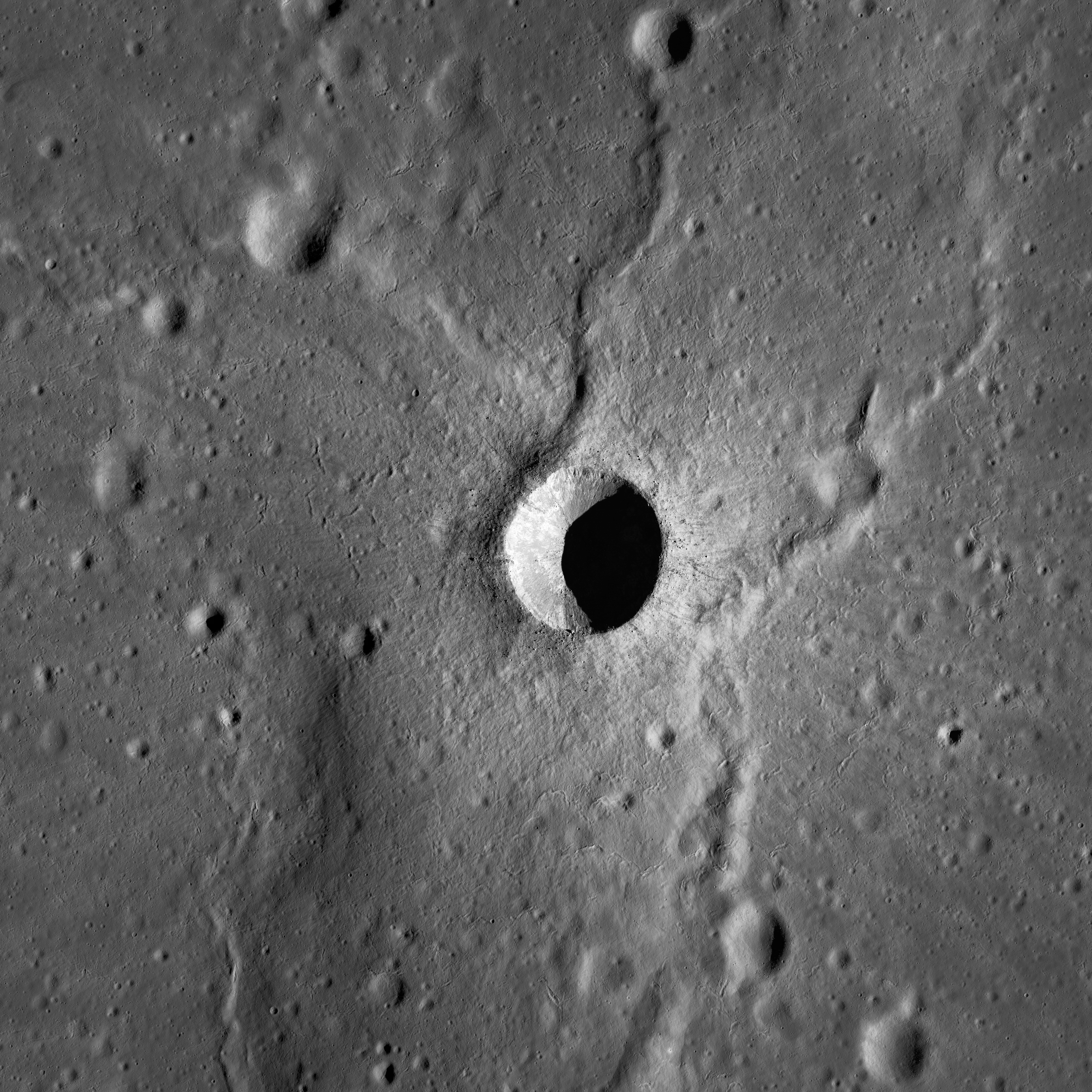
The hill Posidonius γ with the crater Posidonius Y (LRO image).

== Description ==
On the lunar geologic timescale, Posidonius is a crater of Upper (Late) Imbrian age. The rim of Posidonius is shallow and obscured, especially on the western edge, and the interior has been overlain by a lava flow in the past. The crater ramparts can still be observed to the south and east of the crater rim, and to a lesser degree to the north.

There is a smaller, semi-circular rim of a concentric, flooded crater within the main rim, offset towards the eastern edge. There is no central peak, but the floor is hilly and laced with a rille system named the Rimae Posidonius. The floor is also slightly bulged due to the past lava uplift, which also likely produced the complex of rilles. The northeast rim is interrupted by the smaller crater Posidonius B. Within the crater rim, offset just to the west of center is another smaller crater Posidonius A. The infrared spectrum of pure crystalline plagioclase has been identified on the central hills, and the southeast and southwest rims.

On the Mare Serenitatis surface near Posidonius is a notable system of wrinkle ridges that parallel the nearby shore. These are designated the Dorsa Smirnov. At the peak of these ridges is a small crater, Posidonius Y, with a diameter of 2 km. This crater is surrounded by a patch of high-albedo material, its ray system. This peak was formerly designated Posidonius Gamma (γ).

Posidonius Gamma was first observed by the lunar cartographer Julius Schmidt in 1867, who noted the similarity to the bright patch surrounding the crater Linné.

== Satellite craters ==
By convention these features are identified on lunar maps by placing the letter on the side of the crater midpoint that is closest to Posidonius.

| Posidonius | Coordinates | Diameter, km |
|---|---|---|
| A | 31.69°N 29.52°E | 11.1 |
| B | 33.16°N 31.02°E | 14.1 |
| C | 31.13°N 29.69°E | 3.5 |
| E | 30.55°N 19.7°E | 3.1 |
| F | 32.82°N 27.13°E | 6.0 |
| G | 34.79°N 27.23°E | 4.8 |
| J | 33.8°N 30.79°E | 22.0 |
| M | 34.36°N 30.01°E | 9.3 |
| N | 29.7°N 21.04°E | 6.2 |
| P | 33.6°N 27.58°E | 14.7 |
| W | 31.65°N 20.13°E | 3.0 |
| Y | 30.03°N 24.91°E | 2.0 |
| Z | 30.75°N 22.95°E | 5.9 |
