= Dorsa Aldrovandi =

Wrinkle ridge system on the Moon

Coordinates: 23.6°N 28.7°E

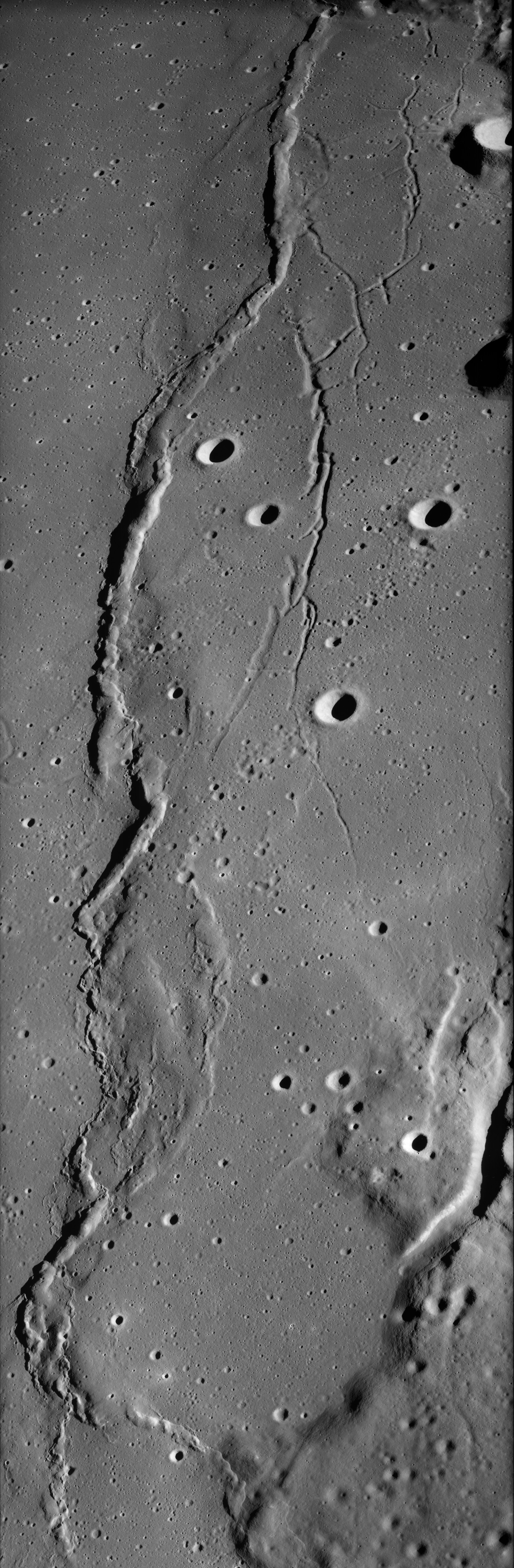
Oblique Apollo 17 panoramic camera image

Dorsa Aldrovandi is a wrinkle ridge system in Mare Serenitatis on the Moon. It is about 127 km long and was named after the 16th-century Italian naturalist Ulisse Aldrovandi. The north end of the feature is at the crater Le Monnier, and the south end is close to the craters Clerke and Abetti.

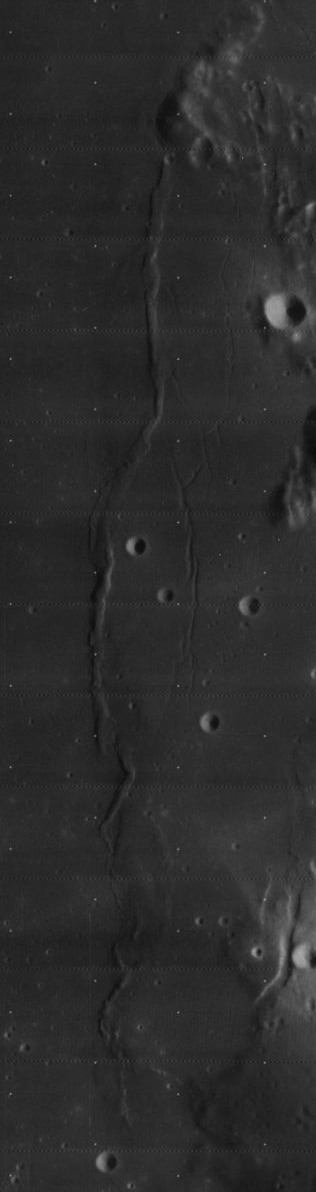
Lunar Orbiter 4 image

Southeast of the ridge is Catena Littrow. West of the southernmost part of the ridge are the crater Borel and the nearest other wrinkle ridge Dorsa Lister.
