= Ching-Te (crater) =

Crater on the Moon

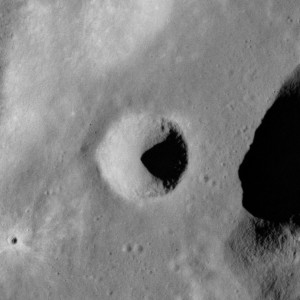
- Apollo 17 image
- Coordinates: 20.02°N 29.97°E
- Diameter: 3.7 km
- Depth: 0.66 km
- Colongitude: 330° at sunrise
- Eponym: Chinese masculine name

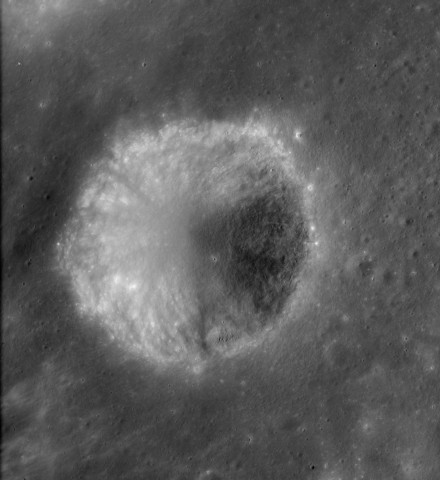
Another view from Apollo 17

Ching-Te is a small lunar impact crater located in a mountainous area to the east of the Mare Serenitatis. It is a circular, bowl-shaped formation with no distinguishing features.

To the south-southeast is the crater Fabbroni, and to the northeast is Littrow. North of Ching-Te is the Rimae Littrow rille system as well as the crater Clerke. Between Ching-Te and Mons Argaeus to the southwest lies the tiny crater Stella, with a bright ray system.

In the Taurus–Littrow valley about 20 kilometers to the east is the landing site of the Apollo 17 expedition.

The name of the crater was proposed by Dr. Farouk El-Baz and approved by the IAU in 1976.
