= Dorsa Smirnov =

Wrinkle ridge system on the Moon

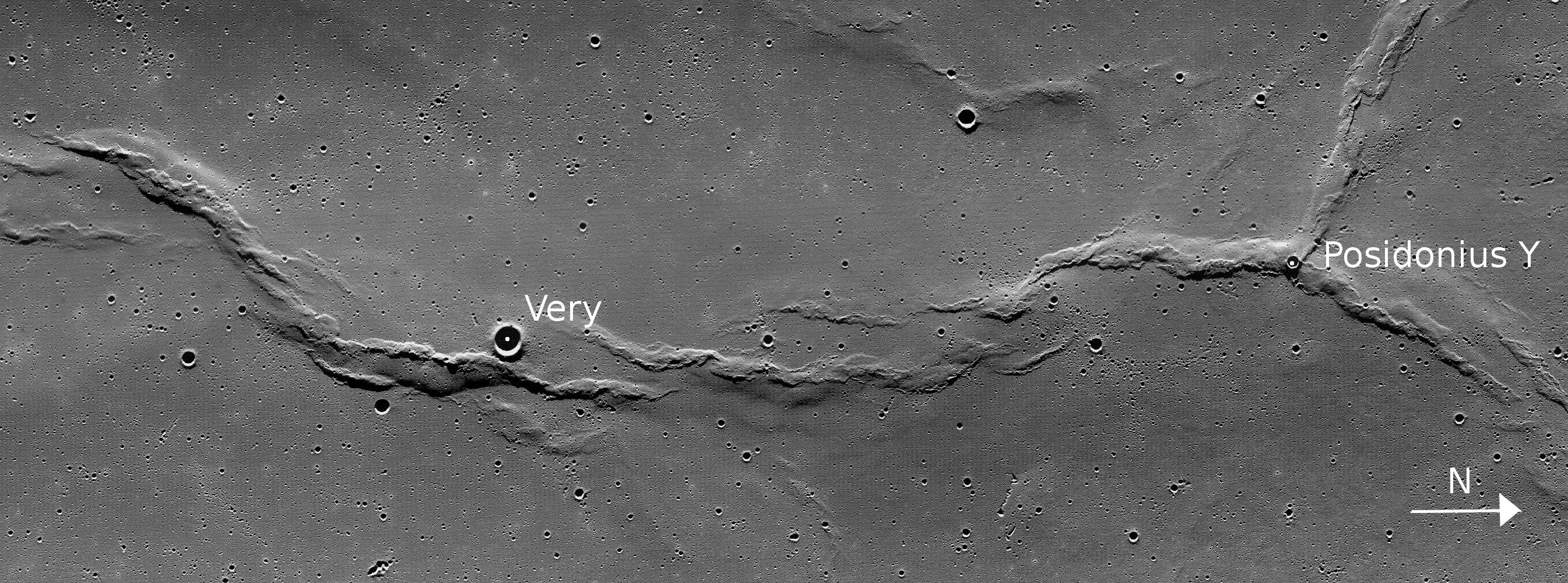
LRO image of Dorsa Smirnov

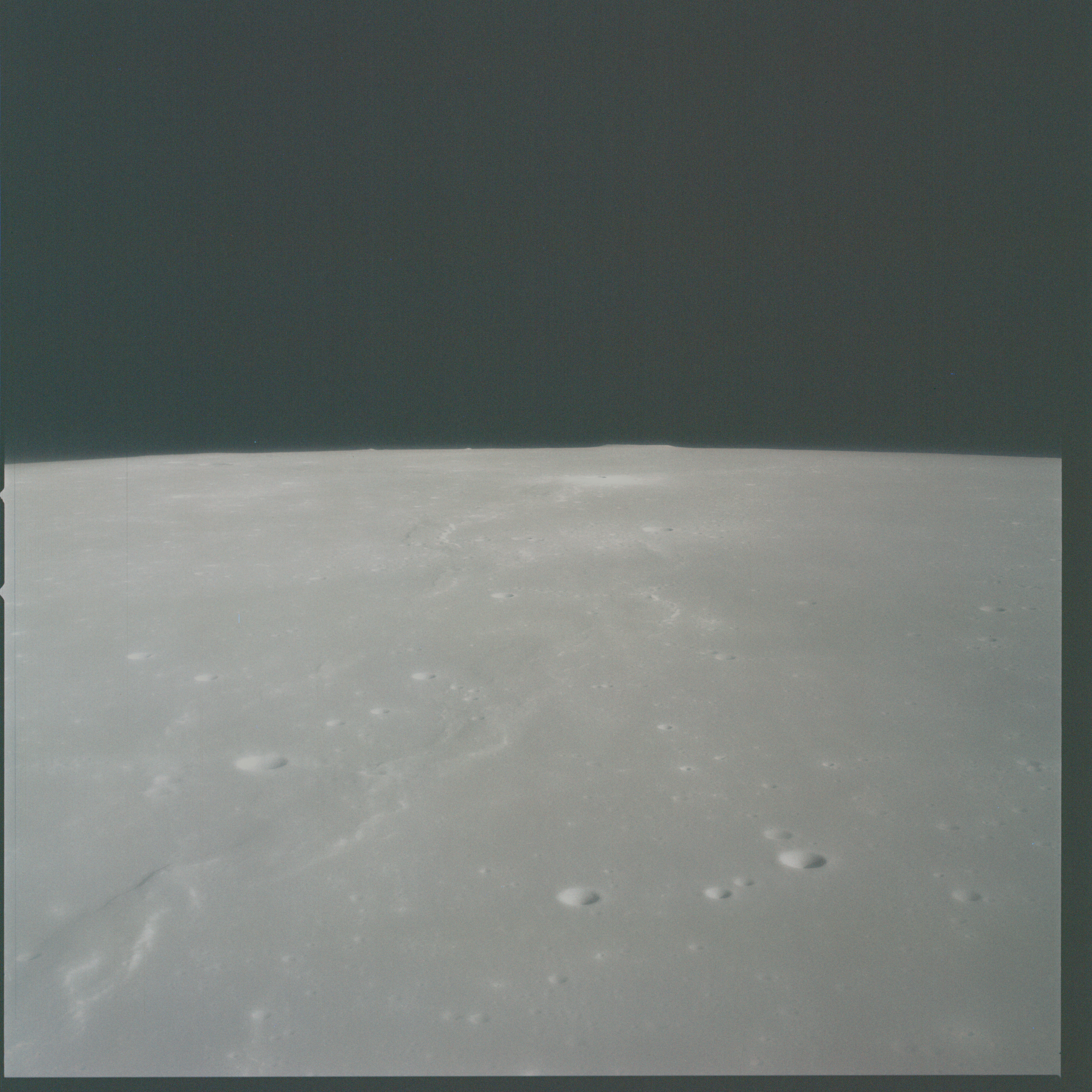
Apollo 15 view of the dorsa facing north, with the crater Luther on the horizon. The spacecraft would have been approximately above the crater Very when the photograph was taken.

Dorsa Smirnov is a wrinkle ridge system in eastern Mare Serenitatis on the Moon. It is 222 km long and was named after Soviet geologist Sergei Sergeevich Smirnov by the IAU in 1976. It's coordinates are 27.3°N 25.3°E.

The small crater Very is adjacent to the Dorsa. Dorsa Lister are roughly parallel with Dorsa Smirnov and to the south of them. Dorsa Aldrovandi are roughly parallel to Dorsa Smirnov and to the east at the edge of the mare.
