= Stella (crater) =

Crater on the Moon

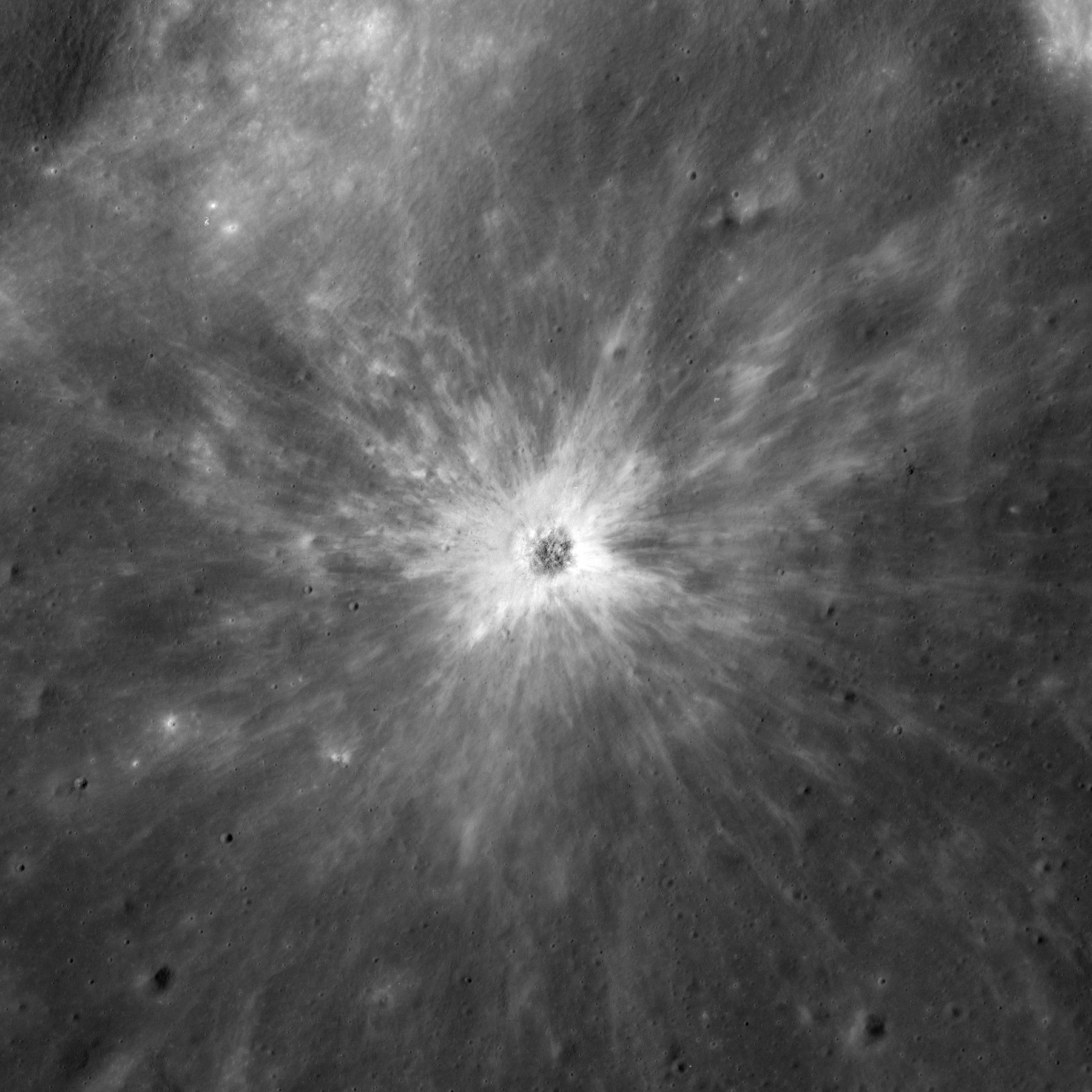
- Apollo 17 image
- Coordinates: 19.91°N 29.76°E
- Diameter: 420 m
- Depth: Unknown
- Colongitude: 330° at sunrise
- Eponym: Latin female name

Stella is a small lunar impact crater on the eastern side of Mare Serenitatis. It is a fresh crater with a prominent bright ray system. It is to the southwest of the larger Ching-Te, and west of the Taurus-Littrow valley where Apollo 17 landed in 1972.

The name of the crater was approved by the IAU in 1976.
