= Very (lunar crater) =

Crater on the Moon

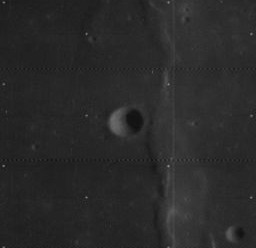
- Lunar Orbiter 4 image
- Coordinates: 25.6°N 25.3°E
- Diameter: 5 km
- Depth: 1.0 km
- Colongitude: 335° at sunrise
- Eponym: Frank W. Very

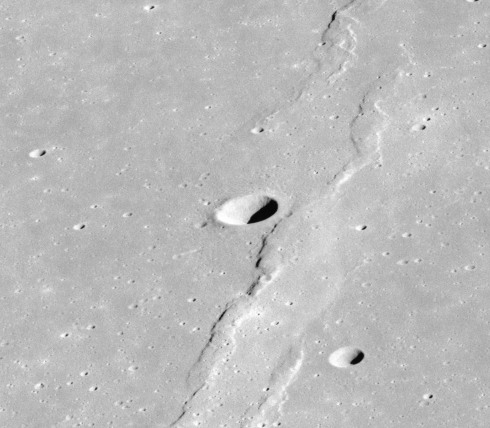
Oblique Apollo 17 image

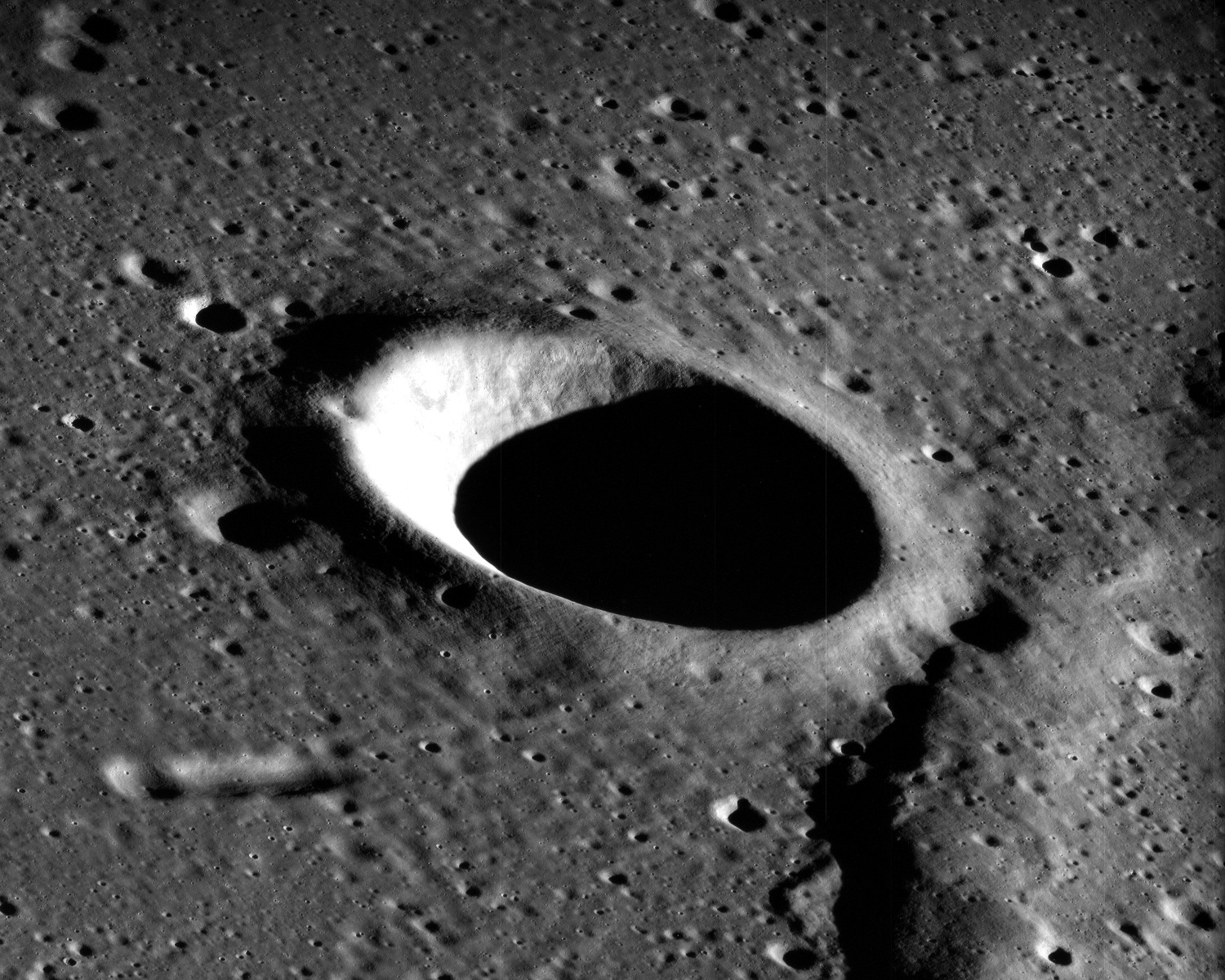
Another Apollo 17 image

Very is a small lunar impact crater located in the eastern part of Mare Serenitatis, to the west-southwest of Le Monnier. It lies upon a wrinkle ridge that runs to the north and south named Dorsa Smirnov. It was named after American astronomer Frank W. Very. The crater was previously known as Le Monnier B, a satellite crater of Le Monnier, before being renamed by the IAU in 1973.
