= Sergey Smirnov (geologist) =

Russian geologist (1895–1947)

- Born: Sergey Sergeyevich Smirnov; 2 or 4 September [14,15 or 16 September N.S.] 1895; Ivanovo-Voznesensk, Shuysky Uyezd, Vladimir Governorate, Russian Empire
- Died: 20 August 1947 (aged 51); Leningrad, RSFSR, Soviet Union
- Education: Saint Petersburg Mining University (1919)
- Scientific career
- Fields: Geology, mineralogy

Sergey Sergeyevich Smirnov (Russian: Серге́й Серге́евич Смирно́в; 2 or 4 September [14, 15 or 16 September N.S.] 1895– 20 August 1947) was a Soviet geologist and mineralogist, academician of the Academy of Sciences of the Soviet Union (1943).

The ridge Dorsa Smirnov on the Moon was named after him.

== Awards and honors ==
- Three Orders of Lenin
- Four Orders of the Red Banner of Labour
- Stalin Prize, 1st class (1946)
