= Ulisse Aldrovandi =

Italian naturalist (1522–1605)

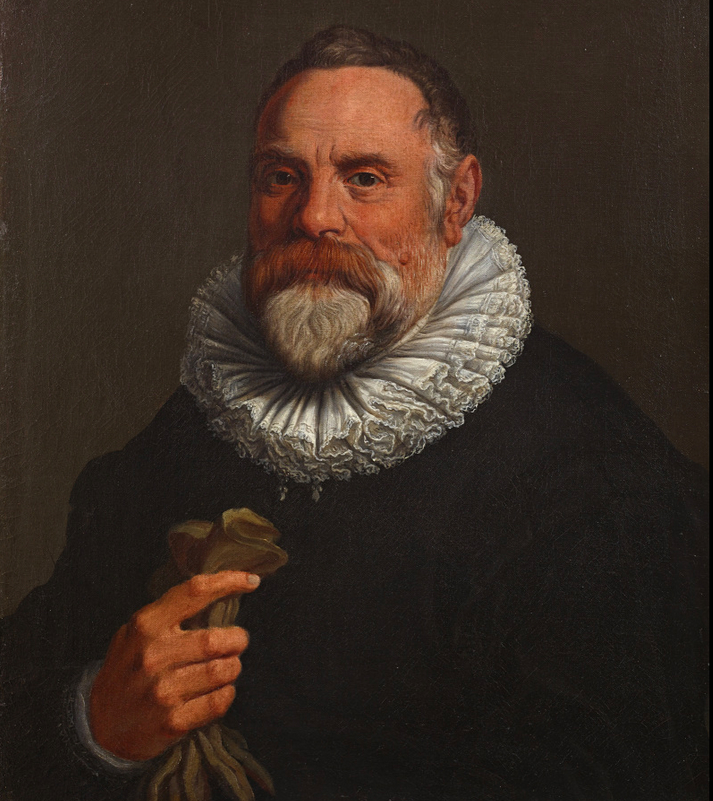
- Portrait of Ulisse Aldrovandi by Agostino Carracci, 1584-1586, Accademia Carrara, Bergamo.
- Born: 11 September 1522; Bologna, Papal States
- Died: 4 May 1605 (aged 82); Bologna, Papal States
- Education: University of Bologna; University of Padua
- Scientific career
- Fields: Natural history
- Workplaces: University of Bologna
- Notable students: Volcher Coiter

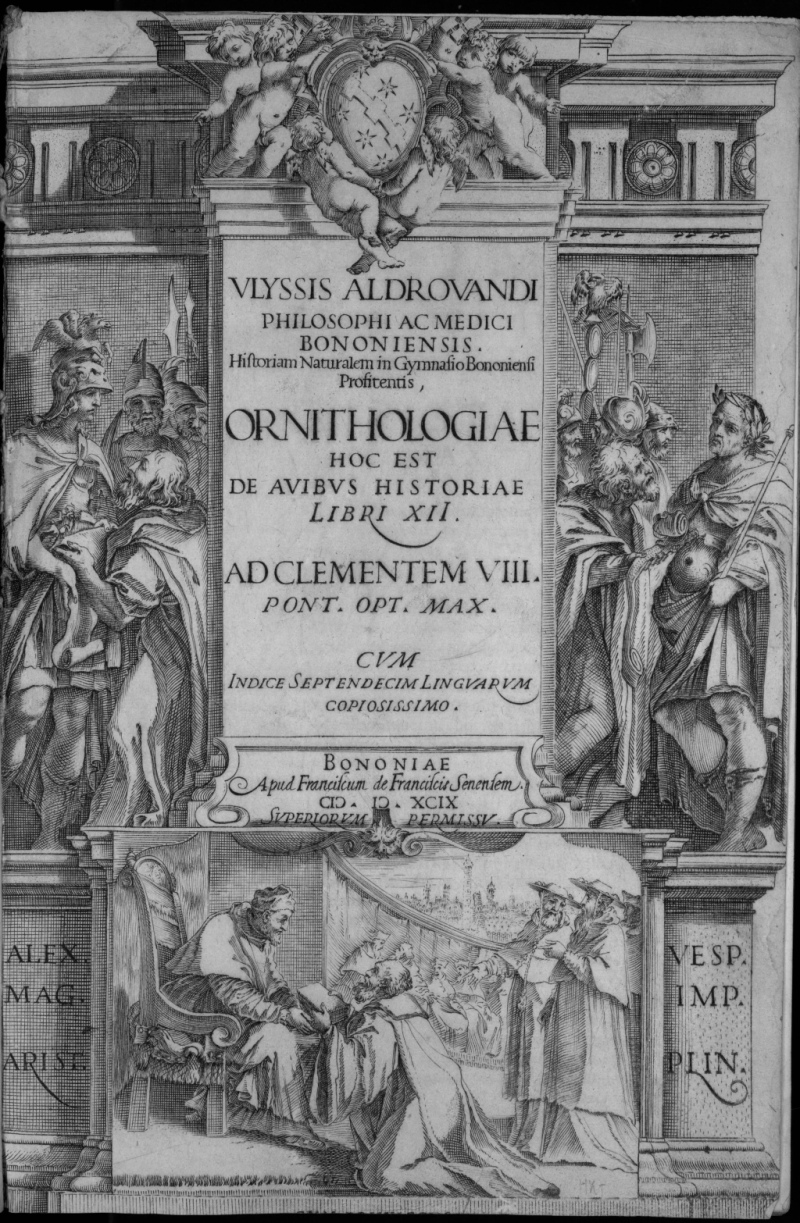
Title page of Ornithologiae, 1599

Ulisse Aldrovandi (11 September 1522 – 4 May 1605) was an Italian naturalist, physician, and polymath. He was the moving force behind Bologna's botanical garden, one of the first in Europe. He had one of the largest natural science collections that was turned into the first public science museum after his death. Although he never practiced as a physician, he studied plants from around the world for medical uses. He had a large network of connection from which he obtained many unique plants and animals that he studied and categorized. He created thirteen volumes of his notes and observations, but only four were published during his lifetime. Carl Linnaeus and the comte de Buffon reckoned him the father of natural history studies. He is usually referred to, especially in older scientific literature in Latin, as Aldrovandus; his name in Italian is equally given as Aldroandi. (Note: As in the title page of his Le antichita de la citta di Roma brevissimamente raccolte, 1556.)

== Life ==
Aldrovandi was born in Bologna to Teseo Aldrovandi and his wife, a noble but poor family of six children. His father was a lawyer, and secretary to the Senate of Bologna, but died when Ulisse was seven years old. His widowed mother wanted him to become a jurist. Initially, he was sent to apprentice with merchants as a scribe for a short time when he was 14 years old, but after studying mathematics, Latin, law, and philosophy, initially at the University of Bologna, and then at the University of Padua in 1545, he became a notary. His interests successively extended to philosophy and logic, which he combined with the study of medicine.

In June 1549, Aldrovandi was accused and arrested for heresy on account of his espousing of the antitrinitarian beliefs of the Anabaptist Camillo Renato. By September, he publicly abjured, but was nevertheless transferred to Rome, and remained in custody or house arrest until absolved in April 1550. Following the Pope's death, he was released but ordered to stay in Rome where he befriended many local scholars. While in light captivity there, he became more and more interested in botany, zoology, and geology (he is credited for the invention/first written record of this word). From 1551 onward, he organized a variety of expeditions to the Italian mountains, countryside, islands, and coasts to collect and catalogue plants.

Despite his numerous travels throughout the Italian peninsula visiting apothecaries and other naturalists, he never personally went on any long-range expeditions for field work. He has been compared to his namesake Ulysses because of his dream to travel around the world and collect natural items. In 1567, he sent a funding request for travel to the New World to conduct research and gather the natural history of the area. Even though he never got the funding, he had connections in Spain from which he obtained Spanish natural samples. In fact, the Pomar Codex from Spain contains identical images of those in Aldrovandi's collection, but it is unknown as to how Aldrovandi's images arrived in Madrid.

Aldrovandi had a great interest in minerals, plants, and animals with medical properties (also known as simples). He actively traveled to find simples and collect specimens and knowledge on various plants for antidotes and other medical applications. He was a strong believer of using Indigenous expertise to grow knowledge of foreign plants but frequently failed to credit them in his writings. He was focused on gathering and distributing reliable knowledge on materia medica and felt that having access to physical foreign samples was the best way to achieve reliable comparison with local natural items. Although he never formally practiced, as a physician he felt that having reliable knowledge of medicinal plants would increase the likelihood that the treatments would be effective.

He obtained a degree in medicine and philosophy in 1553 and started teaching logic and philosophy in 1554 at the University of Bologna. In 1559, he became professor of philosophy, and in 1561, he became the first professor of natural sciences at Bologna (lectura philosophiae naturalis ordinaria de fossilibus, plantis et animalibus). In 1559, a large part of his book collection was burned, assumingely in compliance with the Pauline Index, despite his application to the Catholic Church for a license to keep reading his books that year. Throughout the time of the Catholic book prohibitions, Aldrovandi still maintained correspondence with other botanists or physicians as a part of the Republic of Letters. Aldrovandi was a friend of Francesco de' Medici, Grand Duke of Tuscany (1574 – 1587), visiting his garden at Pratolino and travelling with him, compiling a list of the most valuable plants at Pratolino. (Note: Observationes variae (Tomasi & Hirschauer 2002, footnote 52)) He also formed fruitful associations with botanical artists such as Jacopo Ligozzi, to further develop illustrated texts. He was historically recorded to have exchanged letters with physician Ippolito Salviani about fish found in Bolognese and Roman markets in preparation for a book. This is an example of his contribution to the Republic of Letters that allowed the exchange of scientific knowledge throughout Europe during the Indexes of Prohibited Books. He first married in 1563 to Paola Macchiavelli who died two years later. His second marriage was to Francesca Fontana in 1565 with whom he had two children. They both died during childhood, leaving him with no direct descendants. He died in Bologna on 4 May 1605, at the age of 82.

Aldrovandi's wife Francesca Fontana was invaluable to his research. He used her dowry to build their massive country estate that ultimately included his natural history collection. She was a research partner who located texts for him to cite and use in his books, edited his books, and wrote sections of them, as well. She wrote the preface for his posthumous book On the Remains of Bloodless Animals, which Suzanne Le-May Sheffield described as "their shared work".

== Work ==
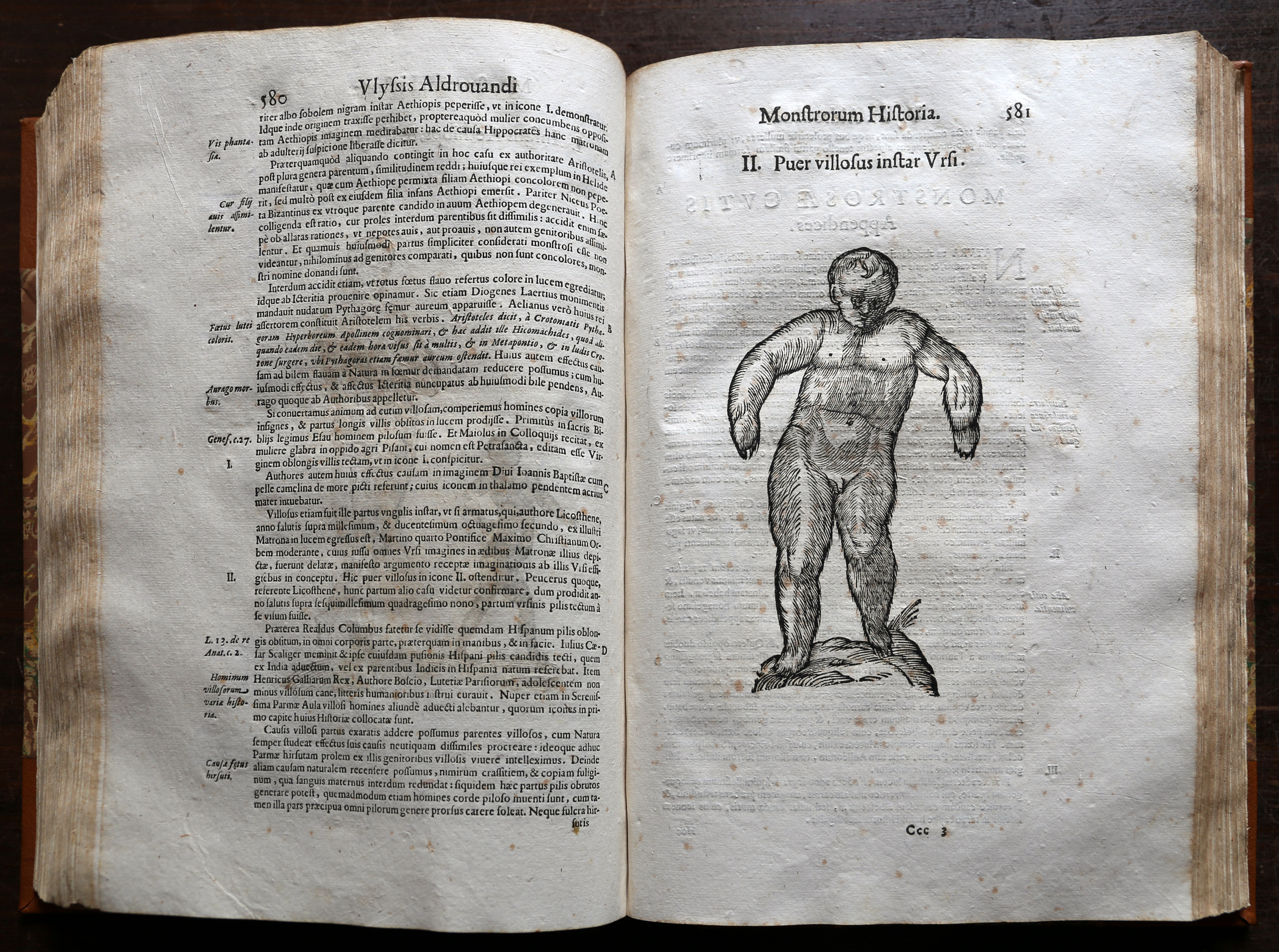
Monstrorum Historia

Over the course of his life, he would assemble one of the most spectacular cabinets of curiosities: his "theatre" illuminating natural history comprising some 7000 specimens of the diversità di cose naturali, of which he wrote a description in 1595. Between 1551 and 1554, he organized annual summer expeditions to collect plants for a herbarium, among the first botanizing expeditions. These expeditions were mostly around the Italian peninsula with only one trip to France and Spain. By 1567, his herbarium contained about 4,300 dried specimens in 13 volumes along with 5,000 other various objects, preserved at the University of Bologna. This collection also included 3,900 books and 300 manuscripts. His final collection was said to have contained at least 18,000 total objects. He also had various artists, including Jacopo Ligozzi, Giovanni Neri, and Cornelio Schwindt, compose illustrations of specimens. He had contacts in various cities such as Paris, Lille, Antwerp, Leuven, Regensburg, Nuremberg, Frankfurt, Cologne, Basel, Prague, Krakow, Warsaw, Valencia, and Cairo from which he received his collections.

=== Botanic garden ===
At his demand and under his direction, a public botanic garden was created in Bologna in 1568, now the Orto Botanico dell'Università di Bologna. Within his botanical garden he conducted experiments and research by closely studying specific materia medica and teaching his students about his findings. Due to a dispute on the composition of a popular medicine with the pharmacists and doctors of Bologna in 1575, he was suspended from all public positions for five years. In 1577, he sought the aid of Pope Gregory XIII (a cousin of his mother), who wrote to the authorities of Bologna to reinstate Aldrovandi in his public offices and request financial aid to help him publish his books.

=== Collections ===
His vast collections in botany and zoology in his home became an important research space for natural science. Descriptions of his collection include marine animals being hung on the ceiling, stuffed birds and other unique animals on the walls, and fossils and skeletons displayed around the room. He notably had sperm whale and other marine skeletons from nearby Italian beaches. He also had various gems and precious stones. His museum also contained a few objects from Egypt, including three funerary statuettes, four amulets, an idol of Isis, a few scarabs, and a fragment of hieroglyphic inscriptions. He willed his collection to the Senate of Bologna which later made it the first public science museum in 1617 after his death, making him a contributor to the expansion of Baconian institutions of knowledge. Until 1742, the collections were conserved in the Palazzo Pubblico, then in the Palazzo Poggi, but were distributed among various libraries and institutions in the course of the 19th century. In 1907, representative parts were reunited at Palazzo Poggi, Bologna, where the 400th anniversary of his death was memorialized in a celebrative exhibition in 2005.

Aldrovandi also created an 83 volume manuscript combining all of his research and collections of notes into an encyclopedia called the Pandechion epistemonicon. He created this encyclopedia to be a “universal forest of knowledge” from his various readings. The encyclopedia contained his research and thoughts on old age, a topic that was of great interest to early modern physicians. In the manuscript he describes old age as nasty and miserable with only a few references to happiness. The collection and organization these notes were mostly done with the help of his second wife, Francesca Fontana. The Pandechion epistemonicon now resides at the Biblioteca Universitaria in Bologna.

=== Fossils ===
Aldrovandi also contributed to the theories surrounding fossil development at that time. Fascinated by the images of animals found in stones, he originally adhered to the theory of celestial influence creating the hideous monsters found in fossils. He then developed the theory that the images of animals were projected onto the stone as it grew from the Earth, but he wasn't opposed to the idea of petrification occurring with salts and sediments on occasion. Mostly, he studied shellfish and fossil imprints found in Egypt and began to follow the theory of spontaneous generation. This theory was applied to Indigenous people in the Americas as well and was a common thought in Europe at the time. To explain the discovery of fossils in the Italian mountains, Aldrovandi used the idea that because of the pressure from the ocean, water can rush up through the mountains and bring impressions of shellfish to higher points. He also believed that the water could give life to fish in the right conditions and, if not, only creates the image of the animal or plant.

=== Neurofibromatosis ===
He was the first to have extensively documented the disease neurofibromatosis, a type of skin tumour. Recently, however, a work by Andrea Mantegna observed that this type of disease had been pictured 80 years earlier than in Aldrovandi's work.

Field	Contribution/Study	Relevant Work and Publication
Ornithology	Birds, their anatomy, behavior, and characteristics	Ornithologiae (1599 - 1603)
Entomology	Insects, their habitat, and physical characteristics	De animalibus insectis libri septem (1683)
Ichthyology	Fish	De Piscibus (1612)
Mammalogy	Quadrupeds	
Herpetology	Snakes, reptiles, dragons	Serpentum
Botany	Collected, documented, illustrated, and studied various plants from around the world and established Bologna's first botanical garden	
Geology	Created a classification of minerals and geological objects	Musaeum metallicum (1648)
Paleontology	Contributed to understanding of fossilization and created a uniform nomenclature for categorizing fossils	

=== List of selected publications ===
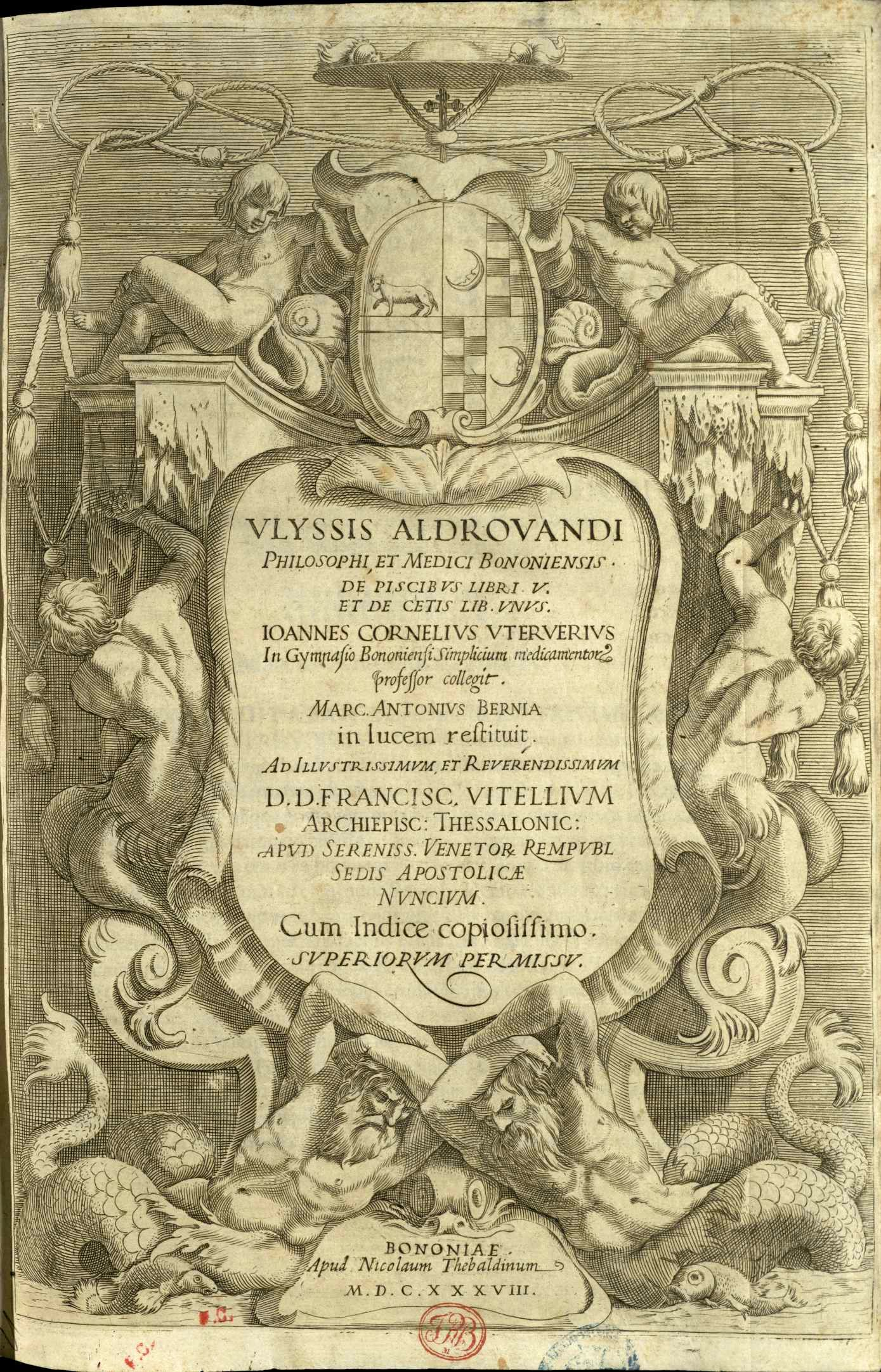
De piscibus, 1661 edition

Of the several hundred books and essays he wrote, only a handful were published during his lifetime:

- Antidotarii Bononiensis, siue de vsitata ratione componendorum, miscendorumque medicamentorum, epitome (1574)
- Ornithologiae hoc est de avibus historiae libri XII (Bologna, 1599), another copy
- Ornithologiae tomus alter cum indice copiosissimo (Bologna, 1600)
- De animalibus insectis libri septem, cum singulorum iconibus ad vivum expressis (Bologna, 1602) 1618 edition
- Ornithologiae tomus tertius, ac postremus (Bologna, 1603) 1637 edition
- De reliquis animalibus exanguibus libri quatuor (Bologna, 1606)
- De piscibus libri V, et De cetis lib. vnus (Bologna, 1613)
- Quadrupedum omnium bisulcorum historia (Bologna, 1621)
- Serpentum, et draconum (Bologna, 1640) (Natural History of Snakes and Dragons)
- Monstrorum historia cum Paralipomenis historiae omnium animalium (Bologna, 1642) 1658 edition from the University and State Library Düsseldorf
- Musaeum metallicum in libros IV distributum Bartholomaeus Ambrosinus (Bologna, 1648)
- Dendrologiae naturalis scilicet arborum historiae libri duo sylua glandaria, acinosumq (Bologna, 1667)
- Observationes Variae Bologna, Biblioteca Universitaria, Ms. 136, XI folio 73

== Honors ==
- The wrinkle ridge Dorsa Aldrovandi on the Moon is named after him.
- The Civico Orto Botanico "Ulisse Aldrovandi" in San Giovanni in Persiceto is named in his honor.
- The plant genus Aldrovanda is named after him.

== Gallery ==
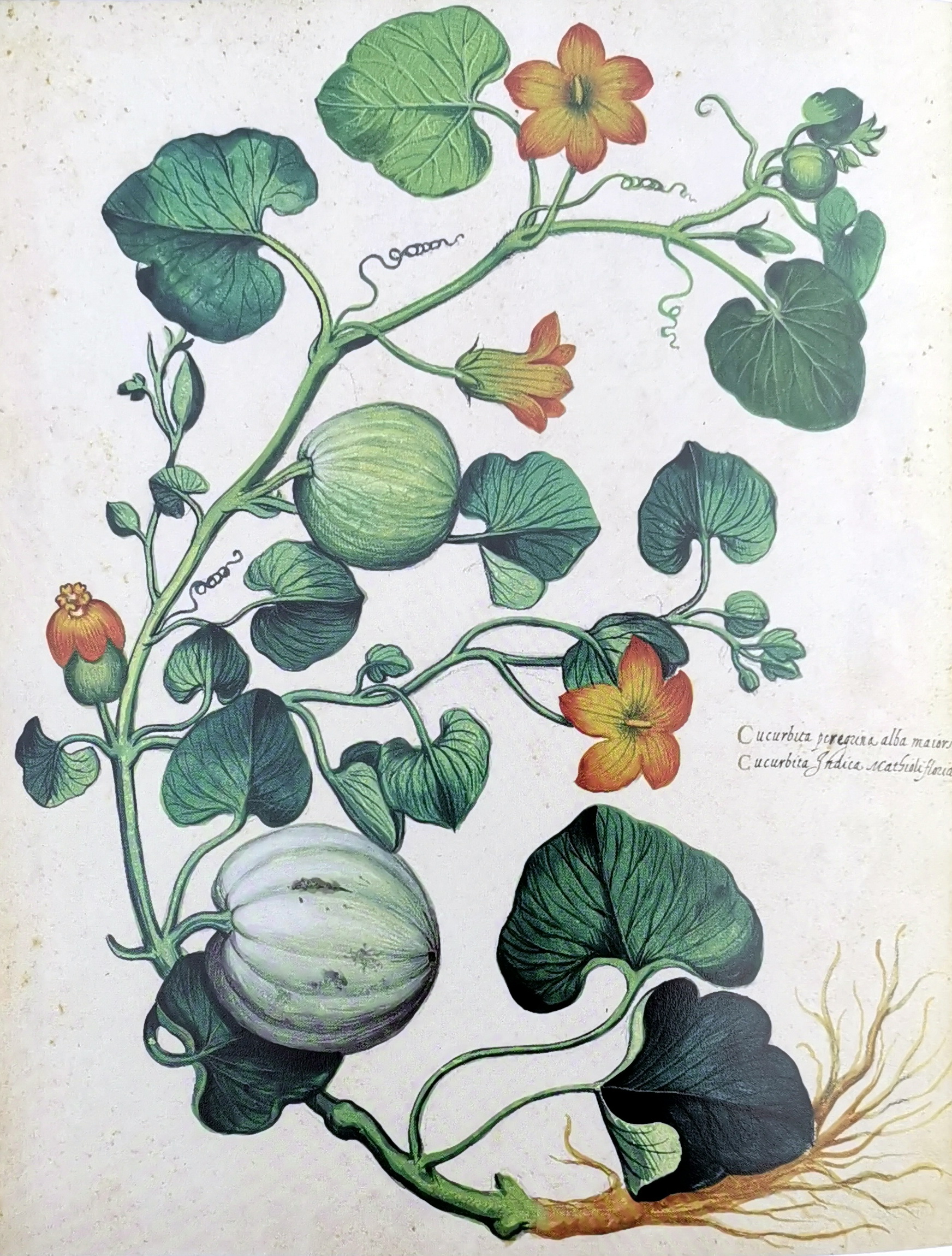
Cucurbita maxima Duchesne (c1660)

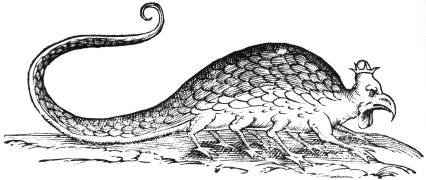
Basilisk from Serpentum, et draconum historiae libri duo (1640)

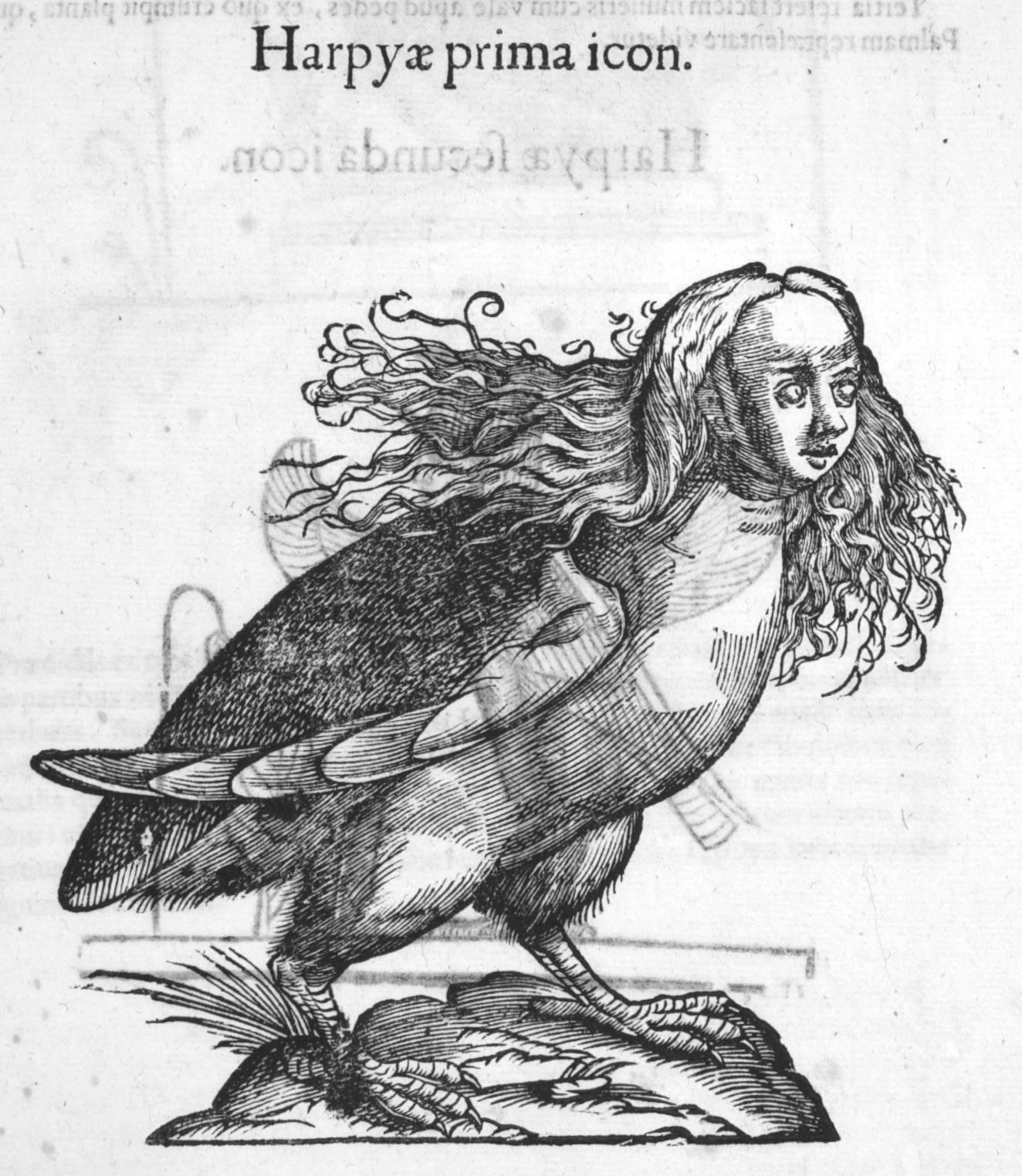
Harpy from Monstrorum Historia (1642)

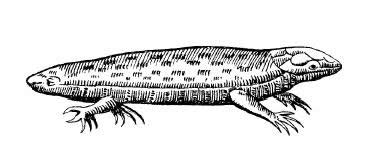
Two headed lizard from Historia serpentum et draconum (1640)

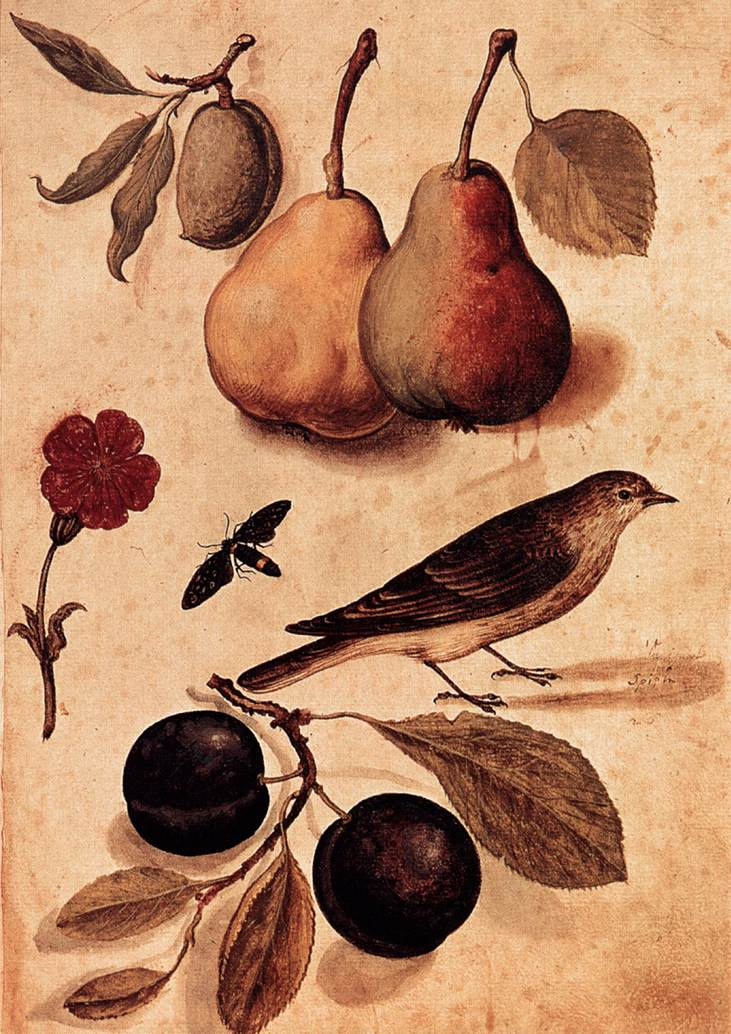
Specimens of Nature

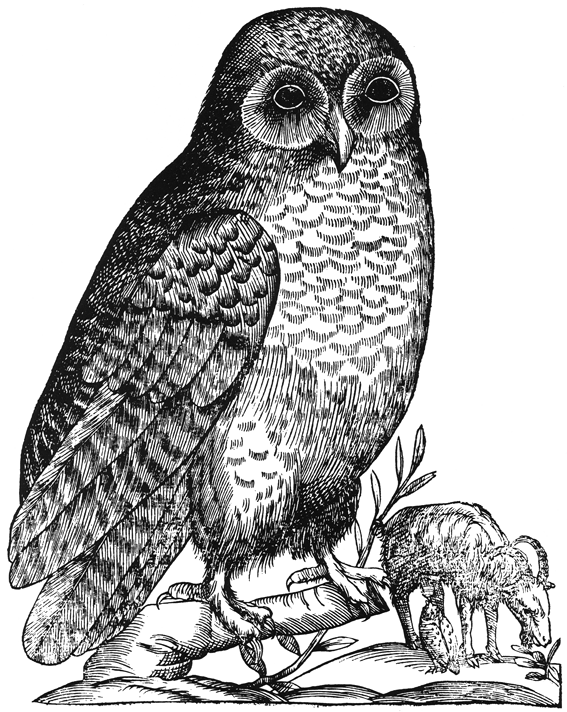
Purdue Owl

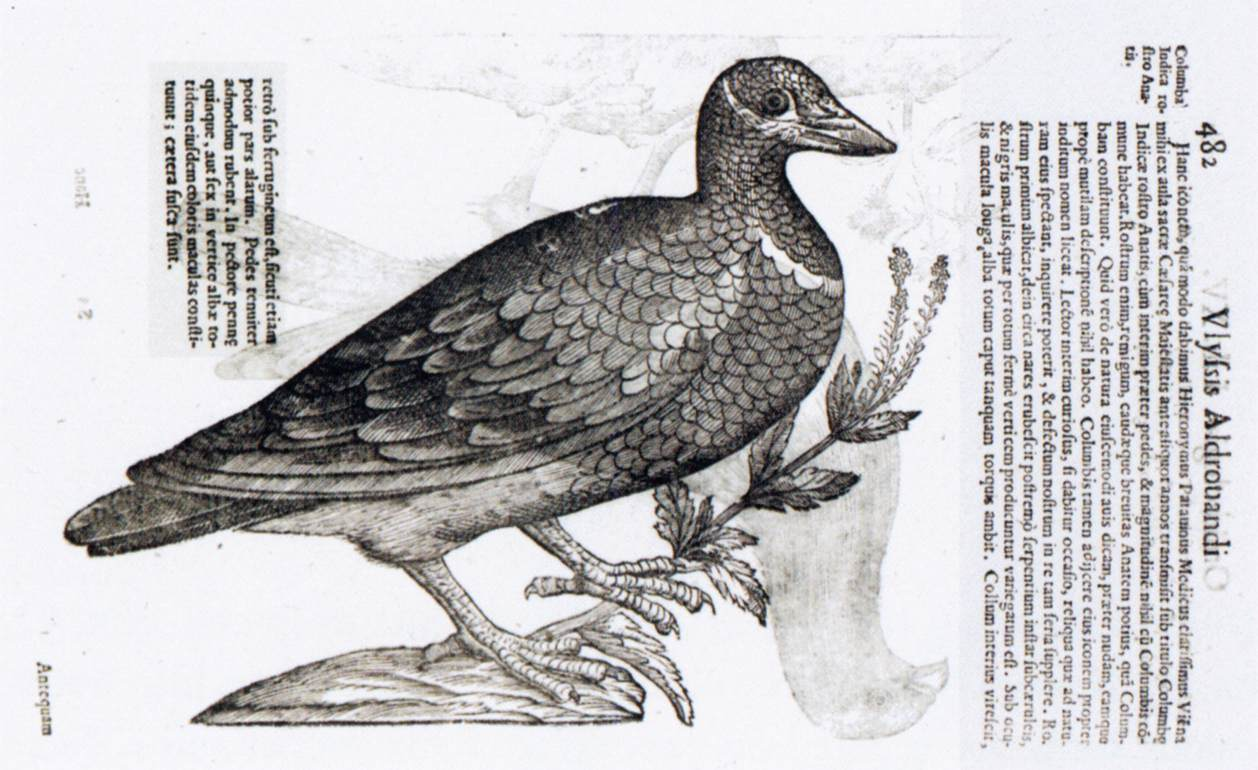
Blue-Headed Quail-Dove

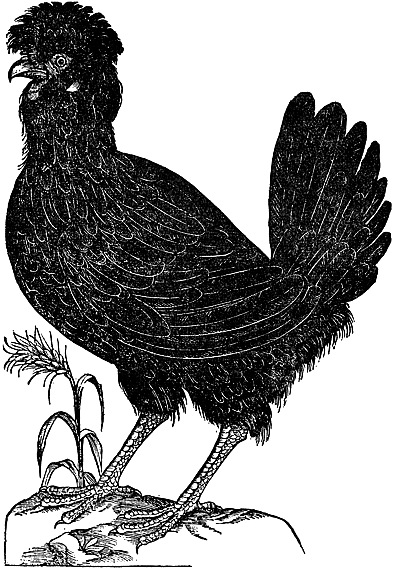
Paduan Hen

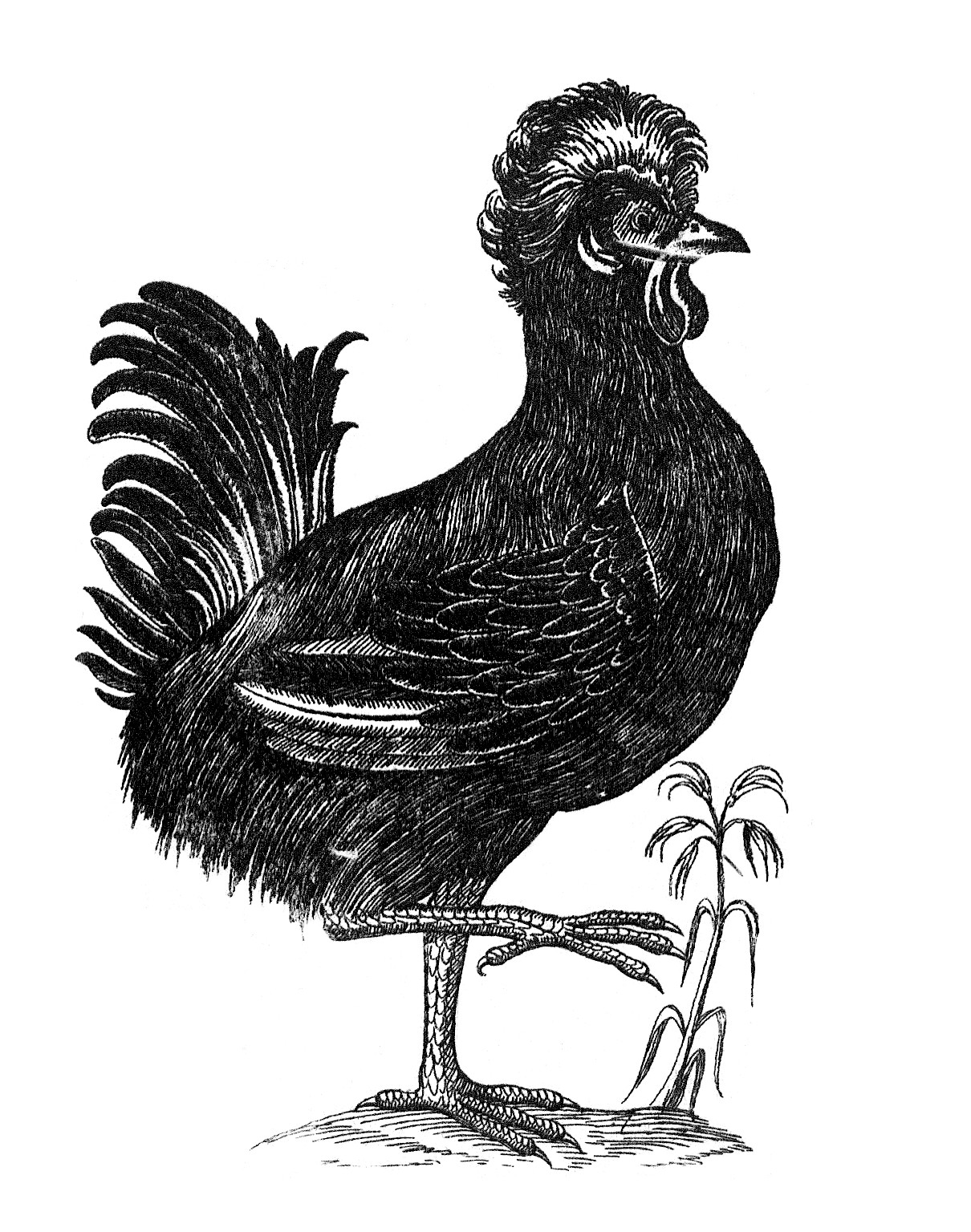
Paduan Rooster

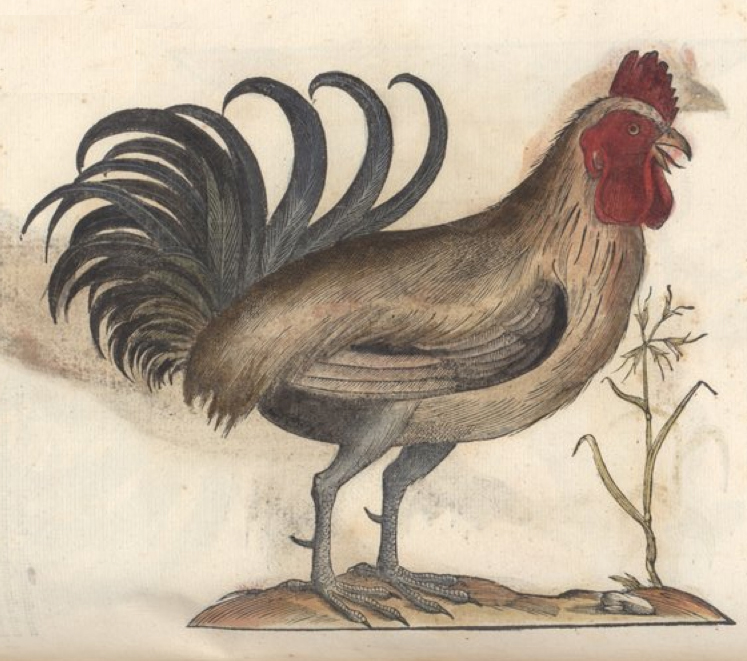
Turcicus Rooster

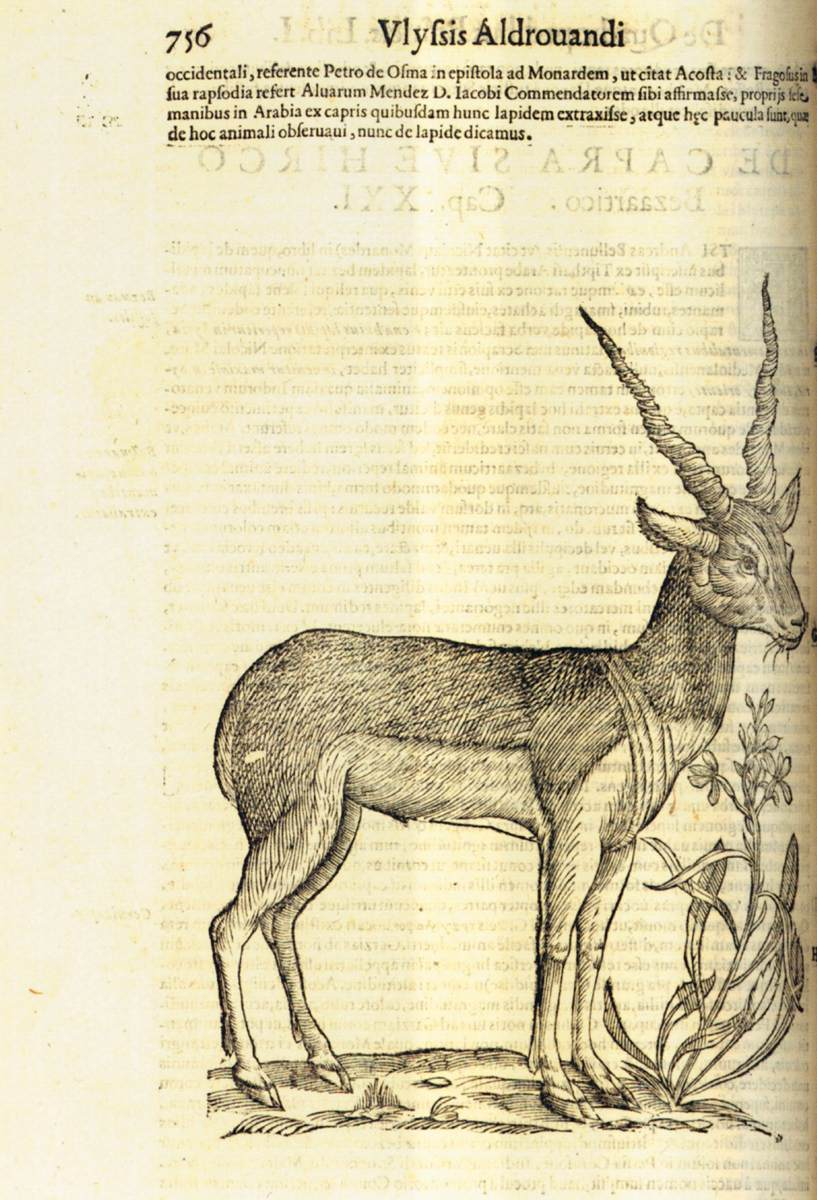
Blackbuck

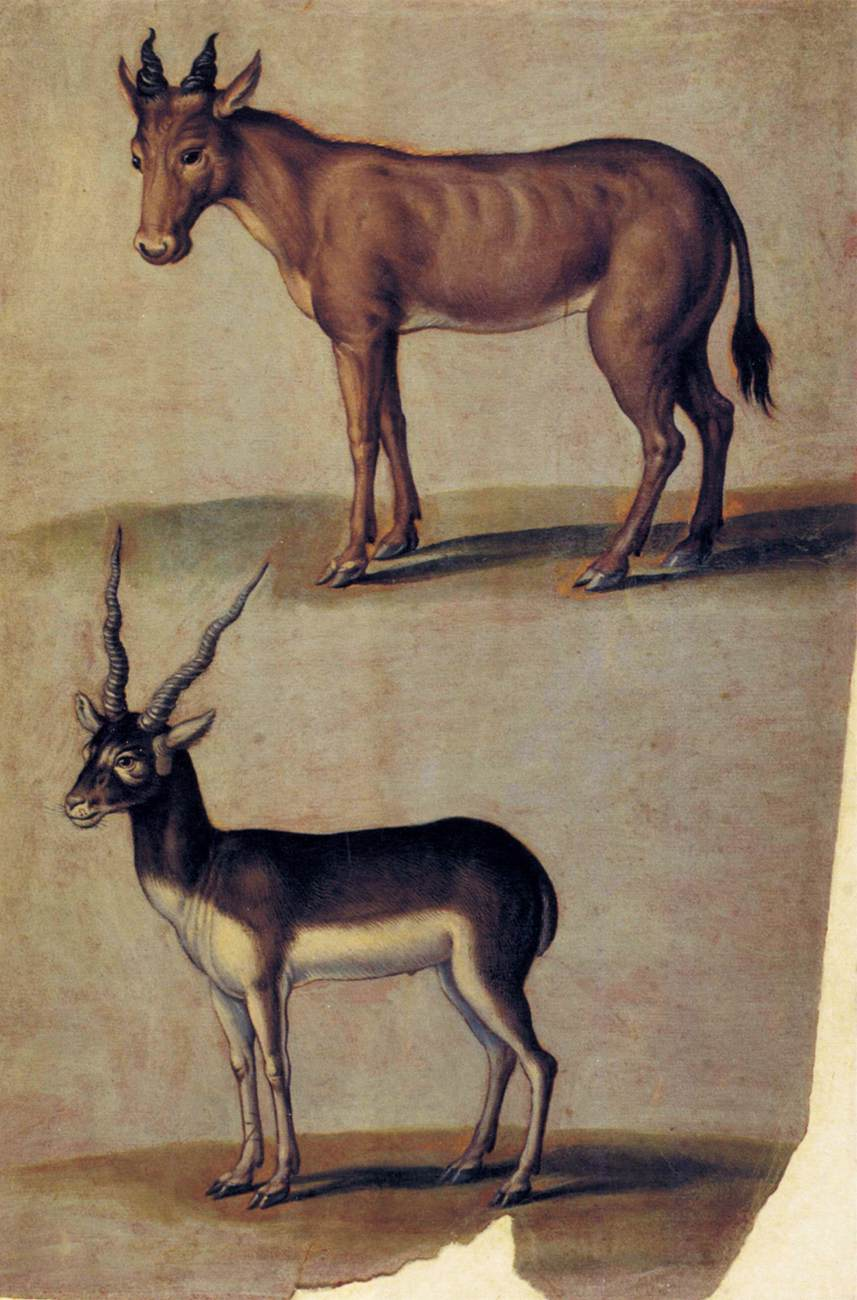
Red Hartebeest and Blackbuck

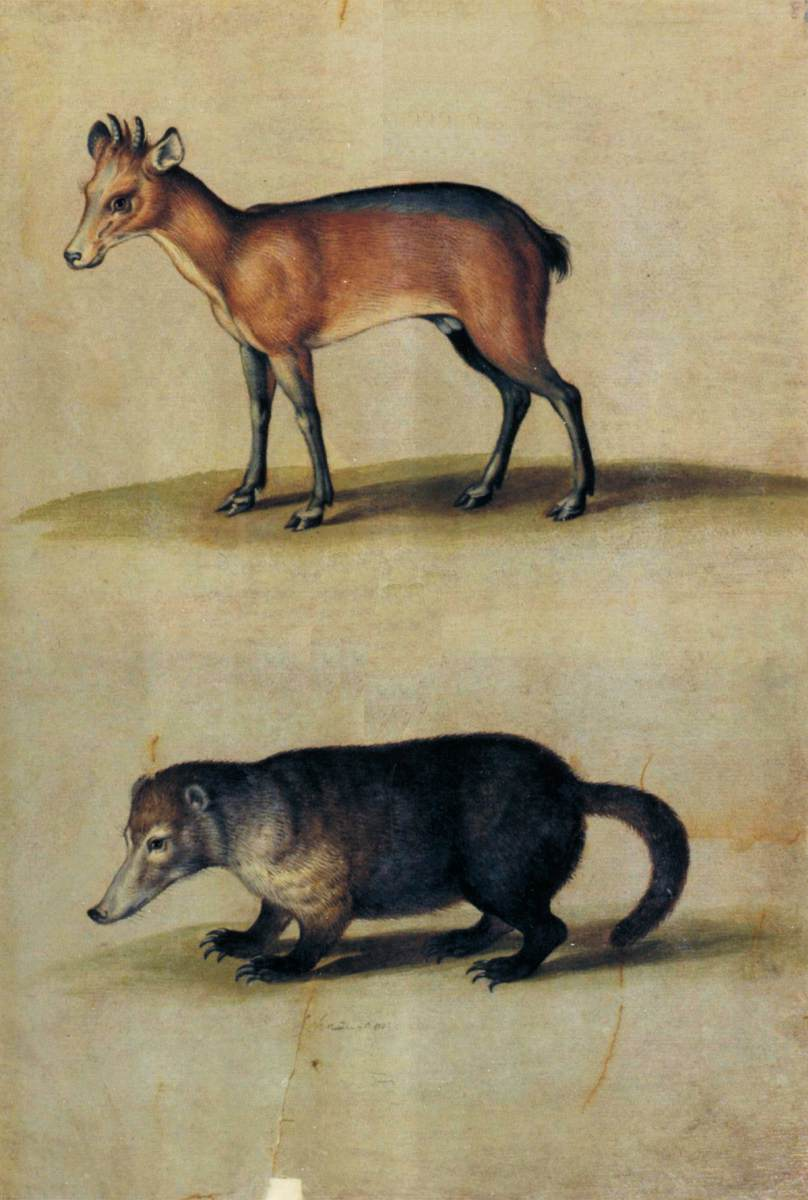
Red Hartebeest and Mountain Coati

== Bibliography ==
- Bianucci, Raffaella; Perciaccante, Antonio; Appenzeller, Otto (October 2016). "Painting neurofibromatosis type 1 in the 15th century". The Lancet Neurology. 15 (11): 1123. doi:10.1016/S1474-4422(16)30210-1. PMID 27647642. S2CID 22047067.
- Castellani, Carlo (1970). "Ulisse Aldrovandi". Dictionary of Scientific Biography. Vol. 1. New York: Charles Scribner's Sons. pp. 108–110. ISBN 978-0-684-10114-9.
- Conan, Michel, ed. (2005). Baroque garden cultures: emulation, sublimation, subversion. Washington, D.C.: Dumbarton Oaks Research Library and Collection. ISBN 9780884023043.
- EB (20 July 1998). Ulisse Aldrovandi. Encyclopædia Britannica.
- Findlen, Paula (1994). Possessing Nature: Museums, Collecting, and Scientific Culture in Early Modern Italy. Berkeley: University of California Press. ISBN 978-0-520-07334-0.
- Tomasi, Lucia Tongiorgi; Hirschauer, Gretchen A. (2002). The flowering of Florence: botanical art for the Medici. 3 March-27 May (PDF) (Exhibition catalogue). Washington: National Gallery of Art. ISBN 978-0-85331-857-6.
- Tosi, Alessandro, ed. (1989). Ulisse Aldrovandi e la Toscana: carteggio e testimonianze documentarie. Firenze: L.S. Olschki. ISBN 9788822236821.
- Vai, Gian Battista; Cavazza, William (2003). Four centuries of the word geology: Ulisse Aldrovandi 1603 in Bologna. Minerva. ISBN 978-88-7381-056-8.
- Westfall, Richard S. (1995). "Aldrovandi, Ulisse". The Galileo Project. Rice University.
