= Agnes Mary Clerke =

Irish astronomer and writer (1842–1907)

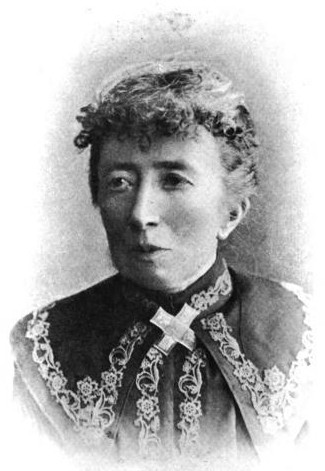
- Born: 10 February 1842; Skibbereen, County Cork, Ireland
- Died: 20 January 1907 (aged 64); London, England

Agnes Mary Clerke (10 February 1842 – 20 January 1907) was an Irish astronomer and writer. She published a number of books on the history of astronomy and on the then-nascent field of astrophysics.

== Family ==
Agnes Clerke was the daughter of John William Clerke (c. 1814–1890) who was, at the time, a bank manager in Skibbereen, County Cork, and his wife Catherine Mary Deasy (born circa 1819) whose father was a judge's registrar. She had two siblings; her older sister, Ellen Mary (1840–1906) and her younger brother, Aubrey St. John (1843–1923). Her elder sister Ellen also wrote about astronomy. All of the Clerke children were entirely home schooled.

Catherine Clerke was educated at the Ursuline Convent school, and therefore placed a great deal of importance on the education of young girls.

== Life and work ==
Following in her father's footsteps—while studying classics, he had also taken courses in astronomy—she developed an interest in astronomy from an early age. Using her father's 4-inch telescope in her observations, she had begun to write a history of astronomy at the age of 15.

In 1861, aged 19, her family moved to Dublin, and in 1863 to Queenstown (present-day Cobh). At the age of 25, partly for health reasons together with her elder sister Ellen, she went to Italy where she stayed until 1877, chiefly at Florence, studying science, languages, and other subjects that would be useful in their later lives. In 1877, she settled in London.

Upon her return, she was able to get two articles written while she had been in Italy, "Brigandage in Sicily" and "Copernicus in Italy", published in the Edinburgh Review of October 1877. This led to her being asked by Adam and Charles Black, publishers of the Review, who also published the Encyclopædia Britannica, to write biographies of a number of famous scientists for the ninth edition of the encyclopedia.

This led to a number of other commissions, including the publication of the article on astronomy for the Catholic Encyclopedia.

During her career she wrote reviews of many books, including some written in French, German, Greek, or Italian. In 1885, she published her best known work, A Popular History of Astronomy during the Nineteenth Century. This book became commonly used for its discussion of the spectroscope.

Clerke is best known for her work as a scientific writer and historian who documented "new astronomy", now known as astrophysics, for both general and specialist readers. She did this by reading journals and observatory publications, carefully compiling dates and data and engaging with scientific communities in London, including attending lectures at the Royal Institution. Her decade in Florence gave Clerke access to major libraries making the period formative for her best-known book A Popular History of Astronomy during the Nineteenth Century. The book was published in 1885 and Clerke revised it through four editions throughout her lifetime. The book compiled research from many astronomers, explained such research clearly and organized developments in astronomy. It was seen as a leading survey of 19th century astronomy and highlighted Clerke for explaining the increasing importance of spectroscopic methods. In a twentieth-century memoir by the British Astronomical Association, the book was described as a "classic", and Clerke was credited with keeping it current through subsequent editions. An obituary in The Times described her work as foundational for future historians of astronomy due to how thoroughly she gathered and explained new research in celestial physics.

In 1888 she spent three months at the Royal Observatory, Cape of Good Hope. Scholars of the time described her period at the Cape as the moment she linked her documentary approach with firsthand experience. She gained experience in instruments and procedures, particularly in spectroscopy, increasing her clarity and confidence particularly when writing about spectroscopic work. Although contemporary scholars noted her visit, modern scholars with the benefit of hindsight marked it as pivotal as it was Clerke's chance to partake in observational work that influenced her later writing such as The System of the Stars (1890) and Problems in Astrophysics (1903). The System of the Stars explained what was known at the time about stars, including the then-common belief that the universe consisted of only a single galaxy, the Milky Way, while Problems in Astrophysics aimed to identify unresolved questions specifically in stellar spectroscopy. Problems in Astrophysics was regarded as her most impressive work at the time although some noted her lack of practical experience in laboratories or observatories.

In the autumn of 1890, Clerke and her brother Aubrey were founding members of the British Astronomical Association.

In 1893, Clerke was awarded the Actonian Prize of 100 guineas by the Royal Institution. As a member of the British Astronomical Association she attended its meetings regularly, as well as those of the Royal Astronomical Society. In 1903, with Margaret Lindsay Huggins, she was elected an honorary member of the Royal Astronomical Society, a rank previously held only by three other women, Caroline Herschel and Mary Somerville (in 1835), and Anne Sheepshanks (in 1862).

She died of pneumonia in 1907 at her home in South Kensington. After her death she was laid to rest in her family plot in Brompton Cemetery. The British Astronomical Association noted her service to the association.

== Personal life ==
Agnes and Ellen were devout Catholics all their lives. Neither ever married.

== Legacy ==
The lunar crater Clerke is named after her.

In 2002, Mary Brück wrote Agnes Mary Clerke and the Rise of Astrophysics.

In 2017, the Royal Astronomical Society established the Agnes Clerke Medal for the History of Astronomy or Geophysics, which is awarded to individuals who have achieved outstanding research into the history of astronomy or geophysics. The first recipient was Clive Ruggles.

In 2022 Jessie Kennedy and the Celestial Quartet performed a concert in Skibbereen in honour of Clerke. The performance included songs specially composed by Jessie Kennedy and by Tess Leak, using words of Agnes and her sister, Ellen, and a cello trio, the Agnes Clerke Cello Trio, composed by Diana Llewellyn.

== Selected writings ==
- A Popular History of Astronomy during the Nineteenth Century. Edinburgh, 1885 (4th rev. ed. London, 1902)
- The System of the Stars. London, 1890 (2nd ed. London, 1905)
- The Herschels and Modern Astronomy. London, 1895
- The Concise Knowledge Astronomy (co-authored with John Ellard Gore and Alfred Fowler). London, 1898
- Problems in Astrophysics. London, 1903
- "Modern Cosmogonies". London, Adam and Charles Black, 1905.

She also wrote 55 articles for the Edinburgh Review, mainly on subjects connected with astrophysics, and articles for the Dictionary of National Biography, the Encyclopædia Britannica and the Catholic Encyclopedia, and several other periodicals. Her articles in the ninth edition (1875–89) of the Britannica included Galileo Galilei, Alexander von Humboldt, Johannes Kepler, Antoine Lavoisier and the zodiac.
