= Very (Martian crater) =

Very Crater
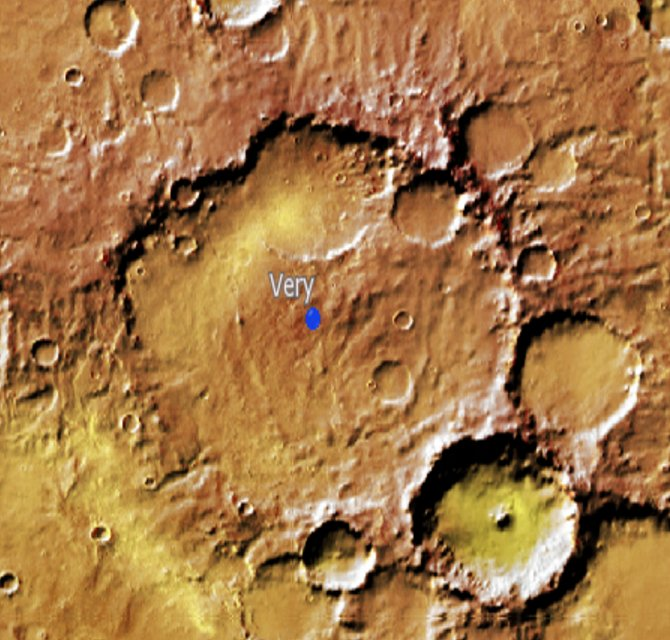
- Topographic location map of Very Crater
- Planet: Mars
- Coordinates: 49.2°S 177.1°W
- Quadrangle: Phaethontis
- Diameter: 114.81 km (71.34 mi)
- Eponym: Frank Washington Very

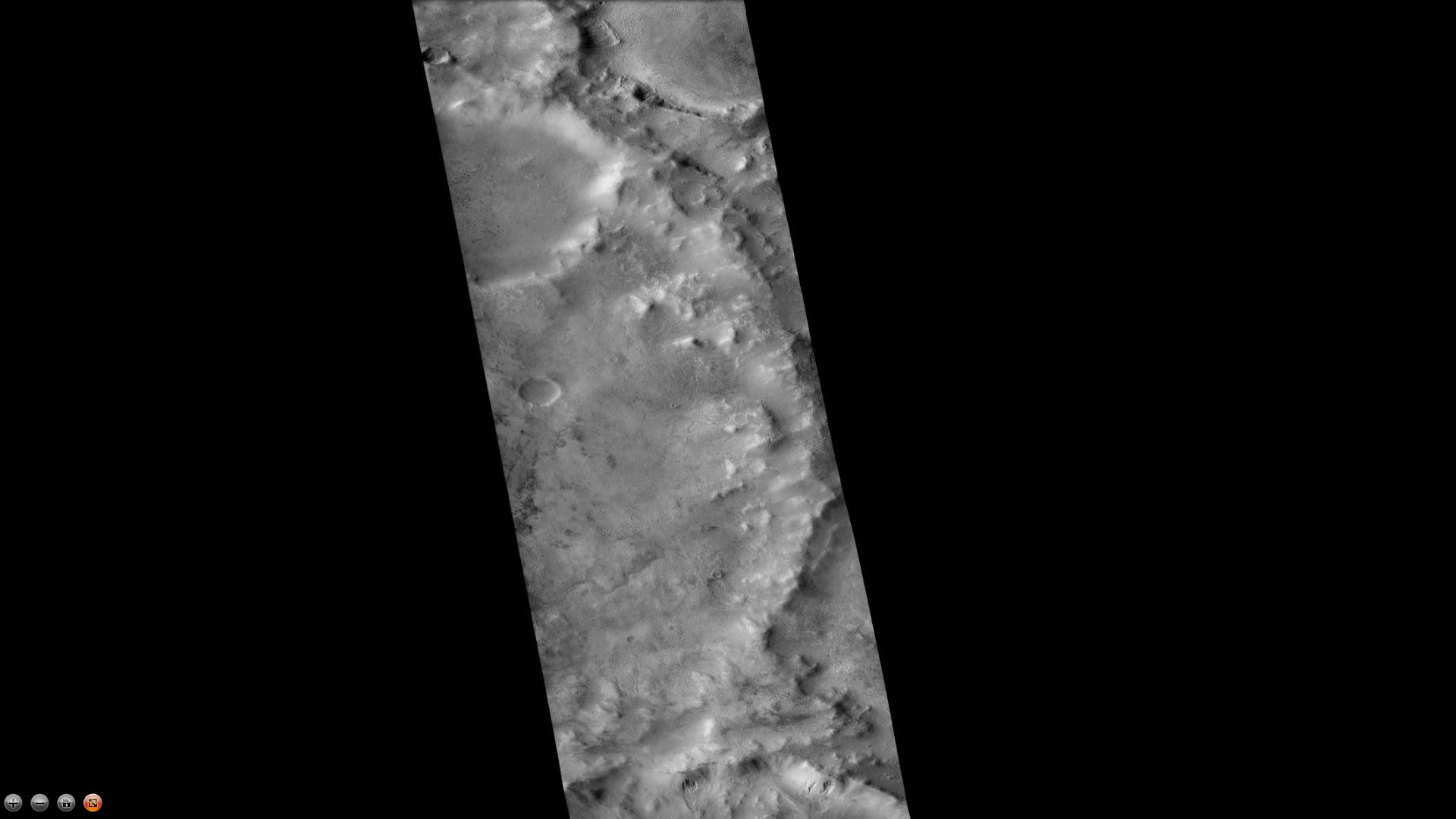
Eastern side of Very Crater, as seen by CTX camera (on Mars Reconnaissance Orbiter).

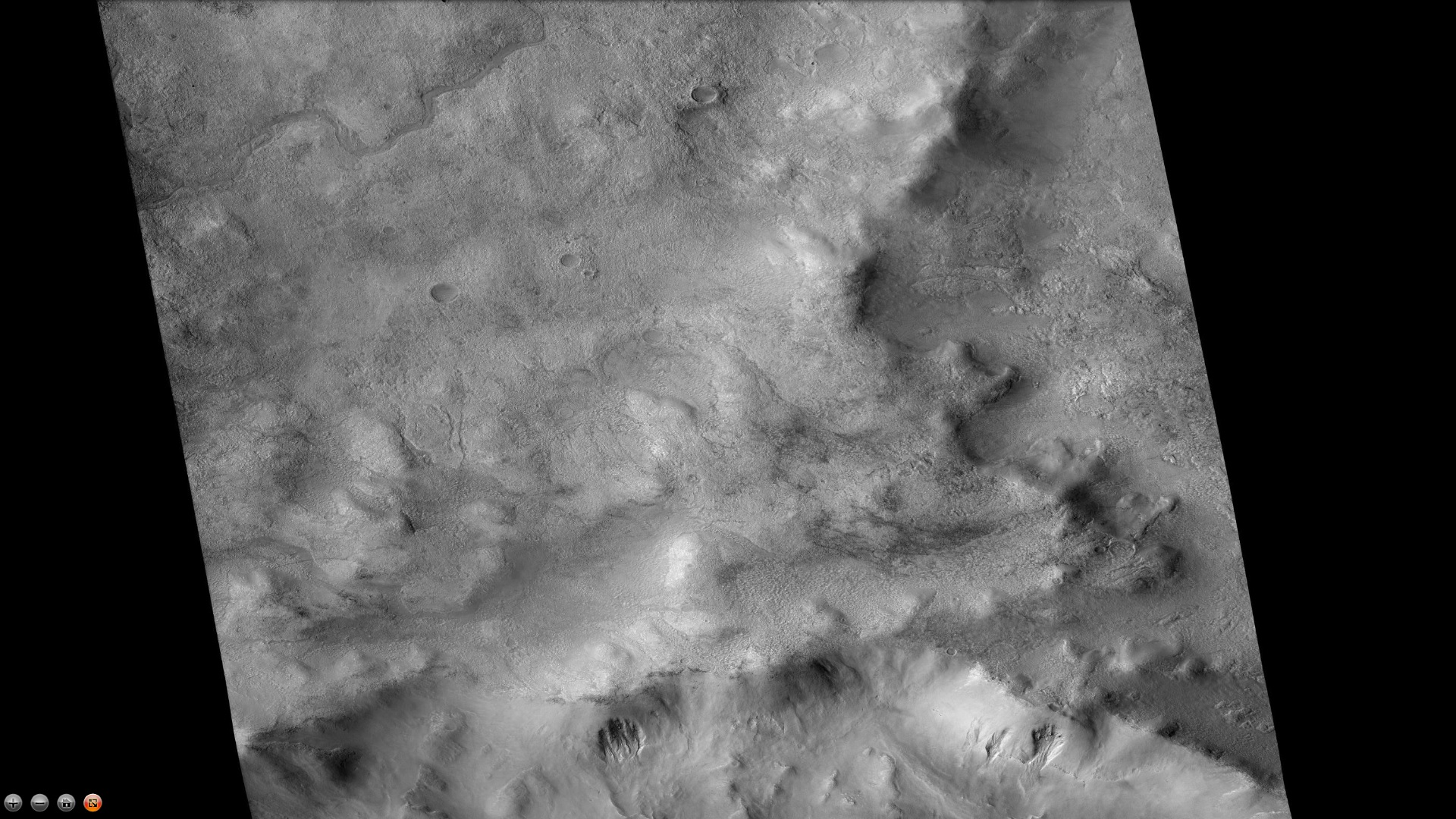
Channel on floor of Very Crater, as seen by CTX camera (on Mars Reconnaissance Orbiter). Gullies are also visible in a smaller crater to the south (bottom). Note this is an enlargement of the previous image of Very.

Very is a crater on Mars, located south of the planet's equator in the heavily cratered highlands of Terra Sirenum in the Phaethontis quadrangle at 49.2°S and 177.1°W. It measures approximately 114.81 kilometres (71.34 mi) in diameter. The crater was named after American astronomer Frank Washington Very.

== Description ==
On the basis of their form, aspects, positions, and location amongst and apparent interaction with features thought to be rich in water ice, many researchers believed that the processes carving the gullies involve liquid water. However, this remains a topic of active research. As soon as gullies were discovered, researchers began to image many gullies over and over, looking for possible changes. By 2006, some changes were found. Later, with further analysis it was determined that the changes could have occurred by dry granular flows rather than being driven by flowing water.

With continued observations many more changes were found in Gasa Crater and others. Since the changes occur in the winter and spring, experts are tending to believe that gullies were formed from dry ice. Before-and-after images demonstrated the timing of this activity coincided with seasonal carbon-dioxide frost and temperatures that would not have allowed for liquid water. When dry ice frost changes to a gas, it may lubricate dry material to flow especially on steep slopes. In some years frost, perhaps as thick as one metre (3 ft 3 in).

== See also ==
- List of craters on Mars
