= Senate of Bologna =

Legislative body in Bologna, 1506–1797

Senate of Bologna Senato di Bologna
- Quadraginta Reformatores status libertatis civitatis Bononiae
- Coat of Bologna

- Flag of Bologna

Type
- Type: Civic governing council of the Senate of Bologna

History
- Founded: 1506
- Disbanded: 1797
- Preceded by: Medieval communal magistracies of Bologna
- Succeeded by: Cispadane Republic

Structure
- Seats: 40, 50 from 1590
- Length of term: Life tenure
- Authority: Papal States

Meeting place
- Palazzo d'Accursio

The Senate of Bologna (Italian: Senato di Bologna [seˈnaːto di boˈloɲɲa]), also known as the Reggimento (Italian: [reddʒiˈmento]; lit. 'regiment'), was the main governing body of the city of Bologna between 1506 and 1797 during the papal period.

== History ==
The Senate was founded in 1506 by Pope Julius II as the Council of Forty. He abolished the senate in 1512 in response to the brief return to power of the Bentivoglio family in Bologna. The following year, his successor Pope Leo X reestablished the senate with thirty-nine members, which returned to 40 members in 1528. In 1590, a papal bull by Pope Sixtus V raised the final number of senate members to fifty.

In 1796, the papal legate was dismissed by French troops under Napoleon, and the senate became the principal authority in the city. The senate ruled the transitory Bolognese Republic for a year before being dissolved by the constitution of the Cispadane Republic.

== Organization ==
After 1590, the senate was composed of 50 members of the city nobility who served for life. The minimum age was twenty-five. Senatorial positions were de facto hereditary: new appointments were made by the Pontiff, who selected from four candidates chosen by the family, typically the son, nephew or brother of the previous senator.

The formal name of the senate, Quadraginta Reformatores status libertatis civitatis Bononiae, was reminiscent of an ancient magistrate dating back to the communal era in Bologna. Notably, the name implied forty members, and the choice of name acted as a rebuke to the addition of ten senators by Sixtus V and to external influence generally.

Executive power in the senate was exercised by the Gonfalonier of Justice (Italian: Gonfaloniere di Giustizia). He was advised by eight Elder Consuls (Italian: Ansiani Consoli) elected every two months by the senate. The Elder Consuls were typically selected from the minor nobility or from the class of lawyers in the city and mainly directed smaller matters, a relic of medieval regulations. The Gonfalonier, formally the head of the senate, signed notices together with the papal legate, but was de facto merely a representative of the city oligarchy of nobles. The Gonfalonier and the eight Elder Consuls resided in the Public Palace (Italian: Palazzo Pubblico), now the Palazzo d'Accursio, while in office.

The senate sponsored a large amount of art and scientific research in the period following the Renaissance. After a plague in 1630, Guido Reni was commissioned to paint a number of works to inspire civic pride, including one of the theotokos with the patron saints of the city. The senate convened twice weekly, on Tuesdays and Fridays. Upon his death in 1605, the naturalist Ulisse Aldrovandi bequeathed the botanical garden he had established in 1567 to the senate. The senate sponsored the compilation of 13 volumes of Androvandi's research on botany and ornithology.

The University of Bologna, largely secular in its instruction, had established faculty for theology in 1364. However, it was not until more than two hundred years later, after the Council of Trent, that the senate created permanent theology positions at the university at the urging of bishops behind the Catholic Reformation. This was followed by the university in nearby Ferrara.

=== Administration ===
Senators were divided into ministries (Italian: assunterie) modeled on the organizational structure of the Roman Catholic dicastery for the concrete administration of government affairs. They remained in office for one year.

- Ministry of the Chamber (Assunteria di Camera): Responsible for fiscal duties and management of the public treasury.
- Ministry of Rural Administration (Assunteria delle Comunità Rurali): Responsible for the administration of rural communities in the surrounding countryside.
- Ministry of Taxes (Assunteria delle Tasse): Oversaw the assessment and collection of taxes.
- Ministry of Urban Works (Assunteria di Ornato): Responsible for the maintenance of roads, sewers, and public land.
- Ministry of Public Assets (Assunteria delle Munizioni): Maintained public assets such as government buildings, walls, and market squares.
- Ministry of Silk (Assunteria di Pavaglione): Oversaw the silk cocoon market, known as the Pavaglione.
- The Mint (Assunteria di Zecca): Supervised the city mint and coinage.
- The Militia (Assunteria di Milizia): Responsible for the organization and upkeep of local militias.
- Ministry of Health (Assunteria di Sanità): Dealt with hygiene, public health, and disease prevention.
- Ministry of Magistrates (Assunteria dei Magistrati): Supervised appointments to minor offices and magistracies.
- Ministry of the University (Assunteria di Studio): Oversaw the administration of the University of Bologna.
- Ministry of the Institute of Science (Assunteria di Istituto): Established in 1712 to supervise the Institute of Sciences.
- Ministry of Grain (Assunteria di Abbondanza): Created during emergencies, particularly to manage the supply of cereals.
- Ministry of Vacancy (Assunteria di Sede Vacante): Installed during vacancies of the papal seat to maintain public order.
- Various (Borders, Relief, Arts, Disputes) (Assunterie delle Gabelle, Confini, Sussidi, Arti, Tasse, Liti): Included temporary or specialized bodies dealing with customs duties, borders, relief measures, guilds, taxation, and disputes.

== See also ==
- Papal States
- Bologna
