= Frank Washington Very =

- Born: February 12, 1852; Salem, Massachusetts
- Died: November 23, 1927 (aged 75); Cambridge, Massachusetts
- Education: Massachusetts Institute of Technology
- Spouse: Portia Mary Vickers
- Scientific career
- Fields: Astronomy, Astrophysics, Meteorology
- Workplaces: Massachusetts Institute of Technology; University of Pittsburgh; Brown University; Westwood Astrophysical Observatory
- Patrons: Percival Lowell

Frank Washington Very (February 12, 1852 – November 23, 1927) was a U.S. astronomer, astrophysicist, and meteorologist. He was born in Salem, Massachusetts, and educated at Massachusetts Institute of Technology (1873) where he taught physics after his graduation.

After several years at MIT, Very was employed at the Allegheny Observatory at the University of Pittsburgh, where he worked from 1878–1895. In 1890, he became a professor and chair of astronomy at the University of Pittsburgh (then known as the Western University of Pennsylvania), concurrent with his post at Allegheny Observatory. He was then made professor and acting director of the Ladd Observatory at Brown University from 1896–1897. After his time at Brown, he worked as an independent researcher for nearly a decade until 1906, when he was appointed director of the Westwood Astrophysical Observatory in Westwood, Massachusetts.

Very's most important work was in measuring the temperatures of the surfaces of the Moon and other planets using a bolometer. Samuel Pierpont Langley published in 1890 a widely read paper that included Very's Moon observations, but for unknown reasons omitted his name from the list of contributors. In 1891, Very published his own paper, "Distribution of the Moon's Heat," which also included measurements taken during a lunar eclipse.

Infrared observations by Langley and Very, published in 1890, were used to make the first calculations of the greenhouse effect.

Very crater on Mars and Very crater on the Moon are named in his honor.

He also addressed the American Astronomical Society at Harvard College Observatory on August 20, 1918, with a paper titled: The Luminiferous Aether 1. Its Relation to The Electron and to A Universal Interstellar Medium 2. Its Relation to The Atom. He seemed to be inspired by Emanuel Swedenborg, a 1700's mystic.

== Published works ==
- Langley, S.P.; Very, F.W. (1889). The temperature of the moon. (From studies at the allegheny observatory.). Memoirs of the National Academy of Sciences. Vol. IV. Washington: U.S. Government Printing Office. Bibcode:1889tmfs.book.....L.
- Very, Frank W. (1891). Prize Essay On the Distribution of the Moon's Heat and its Variation with the Phase. Dordrecht: Springer. doi:10.1007/978-94-017-6042-3. hdl:2027/hvd.hnww3e. ISBN 978-94-017-6042-3.
- Very, Frank W. (1900). Atmospheric Radiation: A Research Conducted at the Allegheny Observatory and at Providence, R.I. Washington: U.S. Government Printing Office.
- Very, Frank W. (1919). The Luminiferous Ether: (I) Its Relation to the Electron and to a Universal Interstellar Medium; (II) Its Relation to the Atom. Boston: Four Seas Company.
