= Borel (crater) =

Lunar impact crater

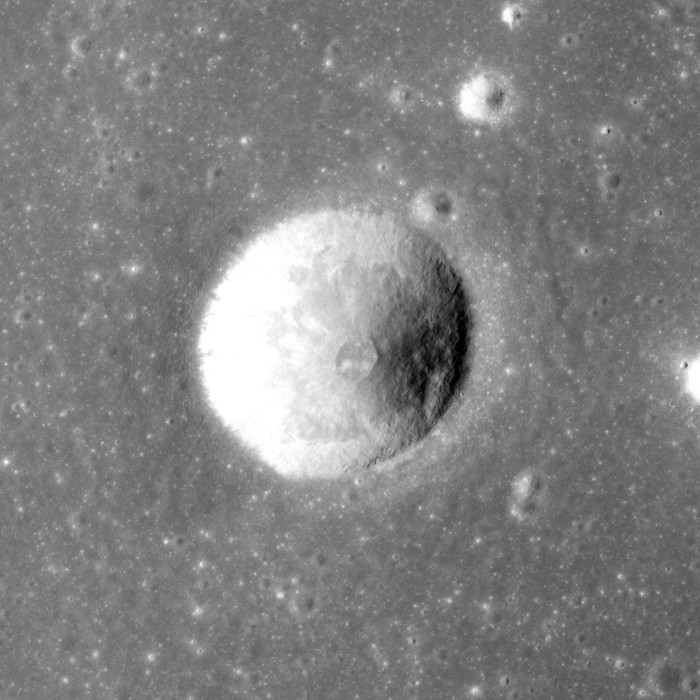
- Apollo 17 image
- Coordinates: 22.3°N 26.4°E
- Diameter: 4.66 km (2.90 mi)
- Depth: 0.84 km (0.52 mi)
- Colongitude: 334° at sunrise
- Formation: Eratosthenian
- Eponym: Émile Borel

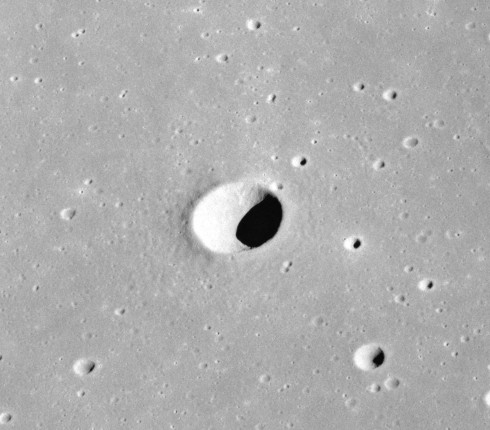
Oblique Apollo 17 image of Borel

Borel is a tiny lunar impact crater located in the southeast part of Mare Serenitatis. To the northeast is the crater Le Monnier and to the south is the crater Dawes.

On the lunar geologic timescale, this formation dates to the Eratosthenian period. It is a roughly circular, cup-shaped formation with inner floors that slope down to the midpoint of the crater. The interior has a higher albedo than the surrounding dark lunar mare.

This crater was named after French mathematician Émile Borel (1871-1956). Before its designation was adopted by the International Astronomical Union in 1976, it was identified as Le Monnier C.
