= Ellen Mary Clerke =

Irish poet, linguist and journalist

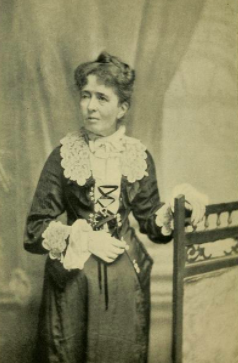
- Born: 20 September 1840; Skibbereen, County Cork, Ireland
- Died: 2 March 1906 (aged 66); London

Ellen Mary Clerke (26 September 1840 – 2 March 1906) was an Irish poet, linguist and a journalist. Originally from County Cork in Ireland, Clerke was educated in Italy. She wrote in English and Italian, publishing works on astronomy, travel, and poetry. Her journalistic works, including on European politics and current affairs, were published in several magazines in the 1880s and 1890s. Clerke died in London in 1906.

== Early life ==
She was the daughter of Catherine Mary Deasy, whose father was a wealthy brewer and shipbuilder in the town of Clonakilty, County Cork, and John William Clerke (c. 1814–1890), a bank manager of Anglo-Irish descent in Skibbereen, and later a registrar for his brother-in-law, Richard Morgan Deasy, a High-Court judge.

Clerke and her younger sister, Agnes, were home-schooled by their parents, particularly by their father in the areas of classical languages and mathematics, which featured heavily in their education. At the age of 27, Clerke moved to Florence, Italy with her sister to continue their educations. Ellen Clerke's primary interest was Italian history and literature. She became an accomplished linguist.

With the linguistic skills she acquired from moving to Italy, she translated Italian poetry and also wrote her own. Aside from translating and writing poems in Italian, she also wrote travel articles and published monographs on two planets—one on Jupiter in 1892 and one on Venus in 1893. Aside from Italian, she also learned German and wrote articles in that language and also learned how to read in Arabic.

== Work ==
Ellen Clerke published a significant volume of content throughout her life. For twenty years, she wrote frequently for The Tablet and also published many travel logs for the Dublin Review for twenty five years. She became one of the magazine's most celebrated journalists, writing many articles on current affairs including Madagascar Past and Present (1884), The Crisis in Rhodesia (1896) and Maritime Canals (1885).

Ellen's younger sister, Agnes, wrote frequently for an astronomical journal called Observatory, and she encouraged Ellen to contribute to the same journal. Ellen Clerke was also a poet, having published several works of poetry during her life. The Flying Dutchmen, a poem which has been out of print for some time, was one of her most famous works. Clerke spent a long period of her life in Florence, Italy, and the Italian culture was a great source of inspiration to her, prompting her to write a book of verse-translations, Fable and Song in Italy, published in 1899, and a novel, Flowers of Fire, a story set in Naples. The novel was published in the years leading up to Clerke's death, but was not well received. One review states, "This story is interesting, as proving that neither Polish conspiracies nor Neapolitan courtships can fill the dreary void left in a novel by the absence of men and women... [the characters] are distinguished from each other only by some external badge, such as yellow hair or a hot temper, and by the single hard black line that marks off the good characters from the bad."

In addition to contributing a number of biographical entries to the Dictionary of National Biography, works by Ellen Mary Clerke include:

- The Flying Dutchman and Other Poems (London: Satchell & Co. 1881), another ed. (1882);
- Jupiter and His System (London: Edward Stanford 1892);
- Translations of poetry in R. Garnett, History of Italian Literature (London: Hutchinson 1902);
- Fable and Song in Italy (London: Grant Richards 1899);
- Flowers of Fire (London: Hutchinson 1902).

== Later life ==
After ten years in Italy, the family moved to London in 1877. There, Clerke took up a post as a journalist at the Dublin Review, a Roman Catholic newspaper. From 1885, Clerke also wrote about Italian and German politics as a permanent editor at the weekly Tablet - a position she held until her death. Ellen Mary Clerke died of pneumonia at her home in South Kensington on 2 March 1906, aged 65, following a short illness.
