= Clerke (crater) =

Crater on the Moon

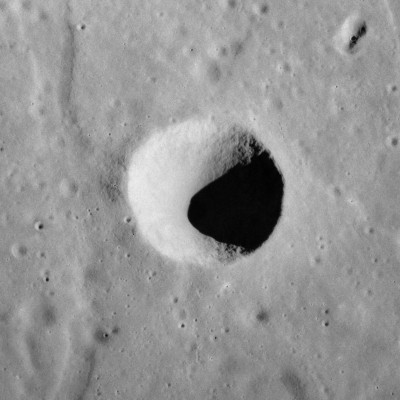
- Apollo 17 image
- Coordinates: 21.7°N 29.8°E
- Diameter: 6.66 km (4.14 mi)
- Depth: 1.47 km (0.91 mi)
- Colongitude: 330° at sunrise
- Eponym: Agnes M. Clerke

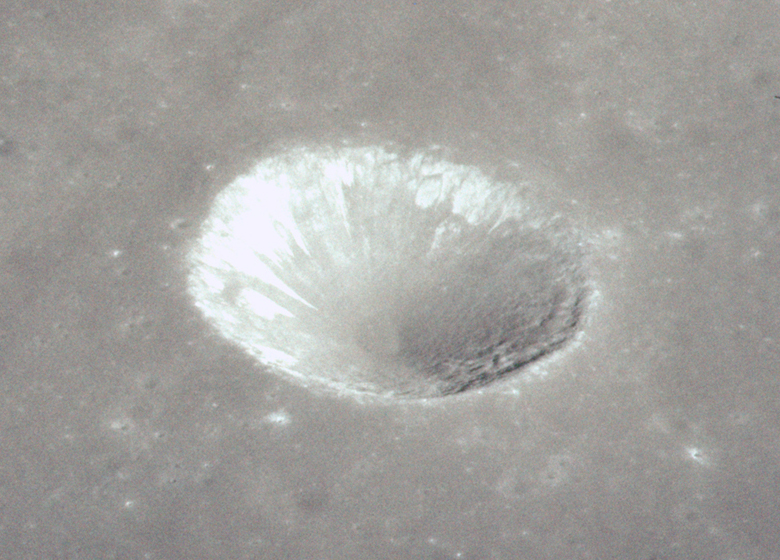
Oblique Apollo 17 image of Clerke

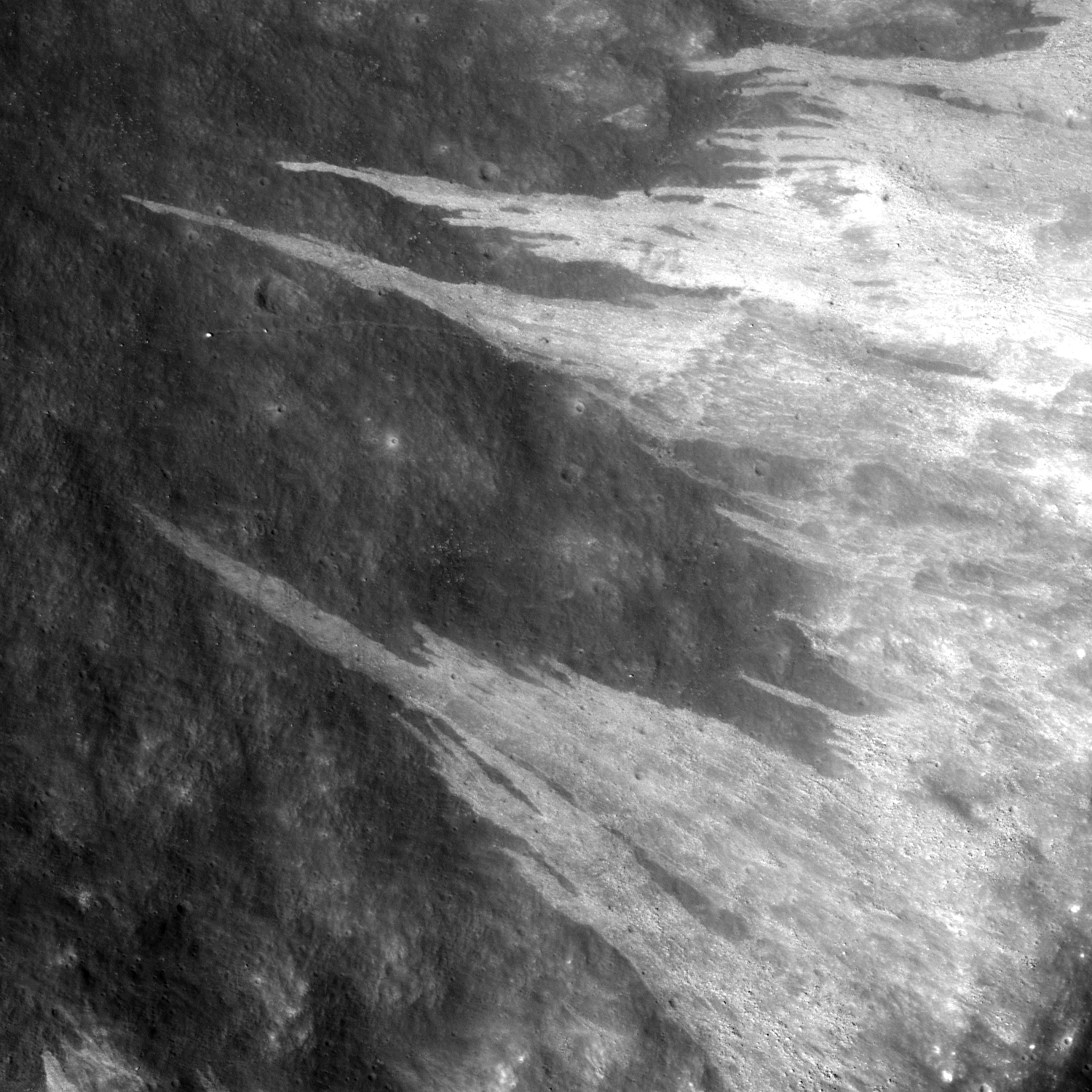
Granular debris flows within Clerke

Clerke is a tiny lunar impact crater. It is located near the eastern edge of Mare Serenitatis in the midst of a rille system named the Rimae Littrow after the crater Littrow to the east. This crater is roughly circular and cup-shaped, with a relatively high albedo. In a valley to the southeast is the landing site of the Apollo 17 mission.

This formation is named after Irish astronomer Agnes Mary Clerke, who played a role in bringing astronomy and astrophysics to the public in Victorian England. Its designation was officially adopted by the International Astronomical Union in 1973. Clerke was previously designated Littrow B.

== See also ==
- Asteroid 9583 Clerke
