= Le Monnier (crater) =

Crater on the Moon

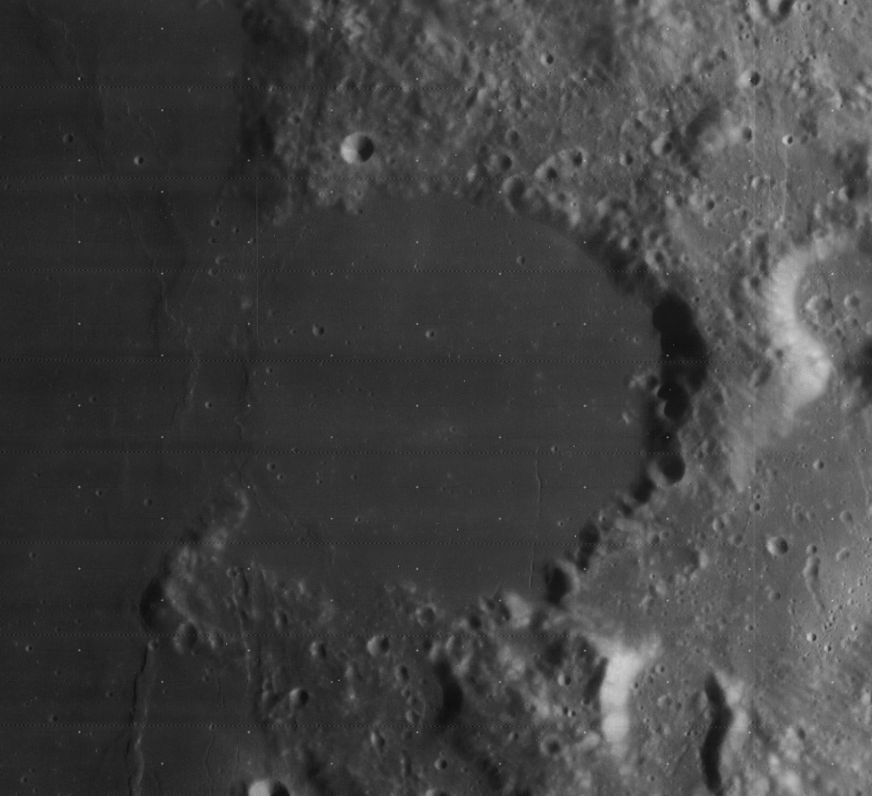
- Lunar Orbiter 4 image
- Coordinates: 26.6°N 30.6°E
- Diameter: 61 km
- Depth: 2.40 km (1.49 mi)
- Colongitude: 330° at sunrise
- Eponym: Pierre Charles Le Monnier

Le Monnier is the remnant of a lunar impact crater that has been partly inundated by lava flows. It was named after French astronomer Pierre Charles Le Monnier. It is located on the eastern edge of Mare Serenitatis, and the western part of the rim is missing so that it now forms a large bay. To the north is the crater Chacornac.

The interior of this formation is relatively flat and smooth, with no significant craterlets to mark the surface. The outer rim is battered, worn, and notched with past impacts. Only slight wrinkle ridges now mark where the western rim once lay.

The landing site of the Luna 21 space probe is located near the southern rim of Le Monnier. Lunokhod 2, a robotic roving vehicle deposited on the surface by Luna 21, covered a distance of 37 kilometers across the crater floor. It also surveyed the southern edge of the crater rim.

== Satellite craters ==
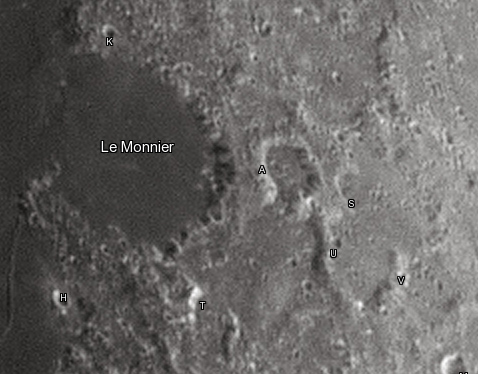
Le Monnier crater and its satellite craters taken from Earth in 2012 at the University of Hertfordshire's Bayfordbury Observatory with the telescopes Meade LX200 14" and Lumenera Skynyx 2-1

By convention these features are identified on lunar maps by placing the letter on the side of the crater midpoint that is closest to Le Monnier.

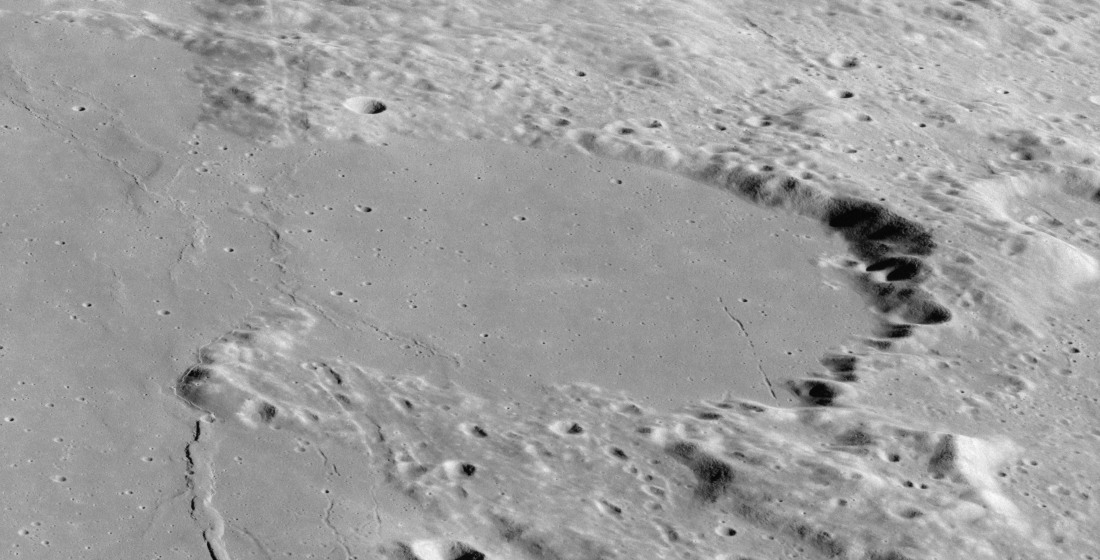
Oblique Apollo 17 image of Le Monnier

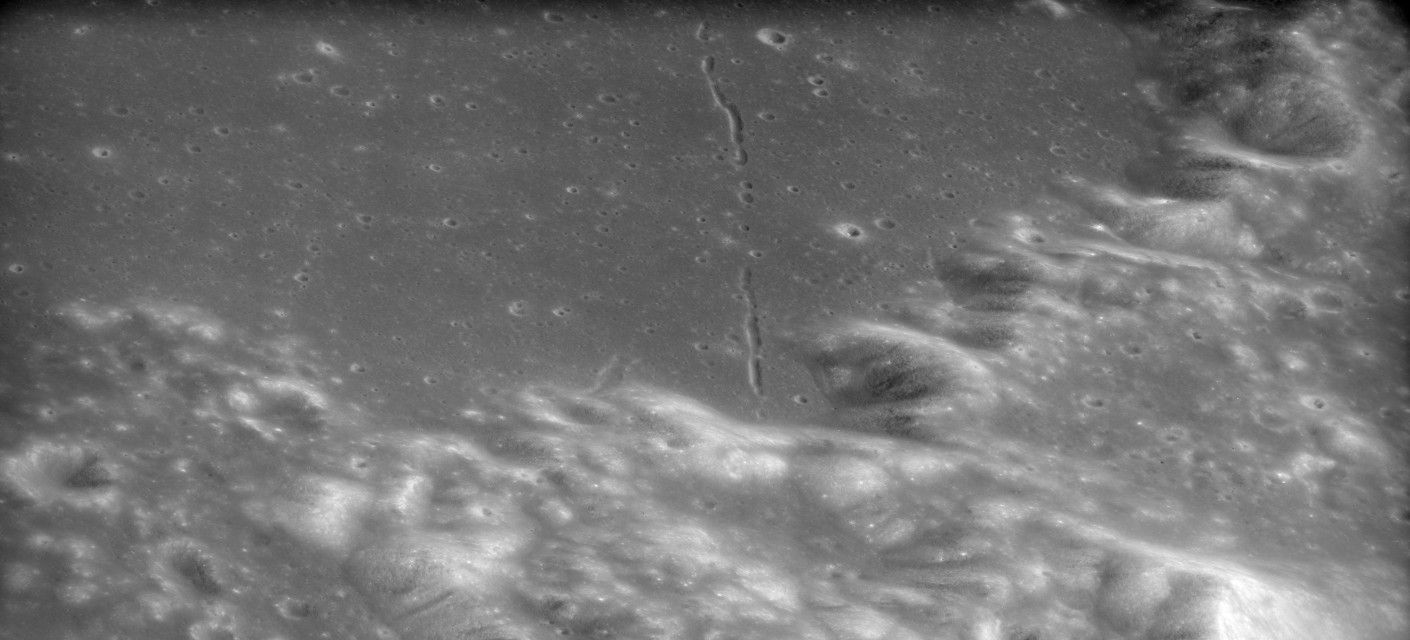
Landing site of Luna 21

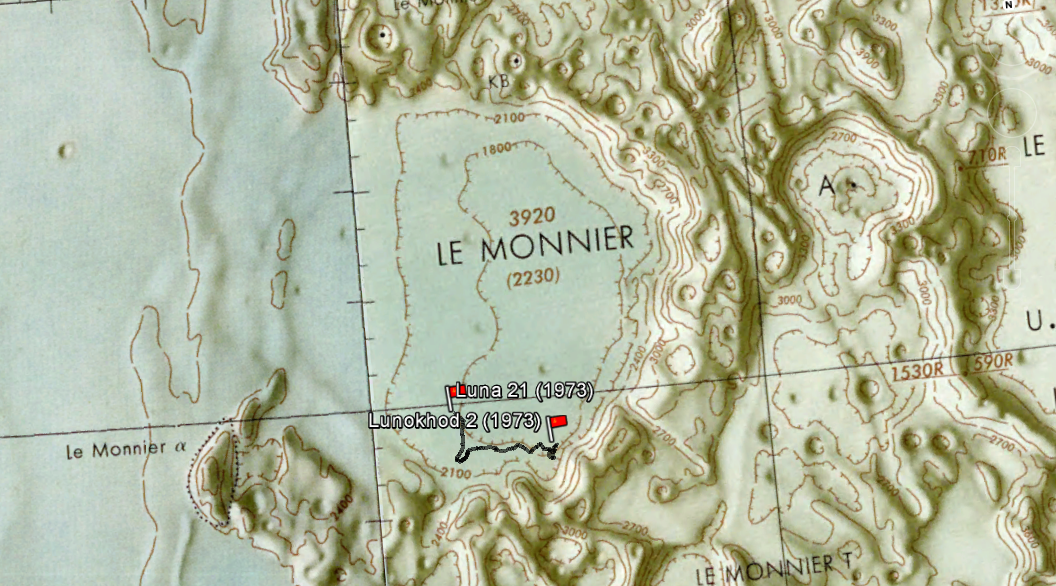
Map of the path taken by the Luna 21 rover Lunokhod 2 in Le Monnier crater

Le Monnier	Latitude	Longitude	Diameter
A	26.9° N	32.5° E	21 km
H	25.0° N	29.6° E	6 km
K	27.7° N	30.2° E	4 km
S	26.8° N	33.9° E	40 km
T	25.1° N	31.4° E	18 km
U	26.1° N	33.5° E	25 km
V	26.0° N	34.3° E	23 km

The following craters have been renamed by the IAU.

- Le Monnier B — See Very (lunar crater).
- Le Monnier C — See Borel (crater).
