= Littrow (crater) =

Crater on the Moon

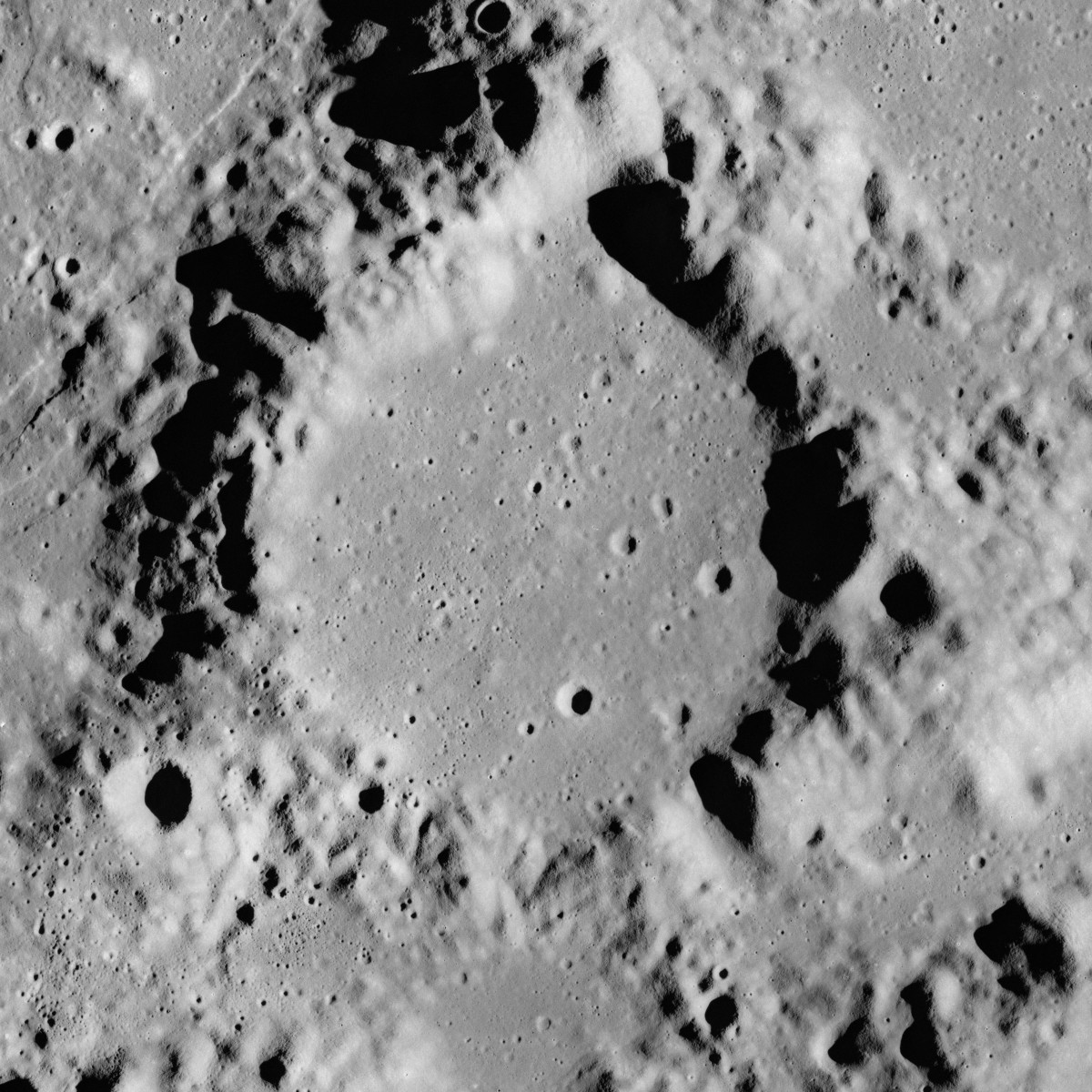
- Apollo 17 image
- Coordinates: 21.5°N 31.4°E
- Diameter: 29 km
- Depth: 1.2 km
- Colongitude: 329° at sunrise
- Eponym: Joseph Johann Littrow

Littrow is a lunar impact crater that is located in the northeastern part of the Moon's near side, on the east edge of Mare Serenitatis. Its diameter is 29 km. The crater is named after Bohemian astronomer Joseph Johann von Littrow (1781–1840). Some distance to the northeast is the prominent crater Römer, while to the south is Vitruvius.

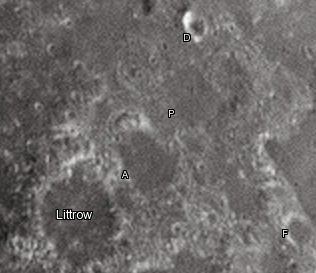
Littrow and its satellite craters taken from Earth in 2012 at the University of Hertfordshire's Bayfordbury Observatory with the telescopes Meade LX200 14" and Lumenera Skynyx 2-1

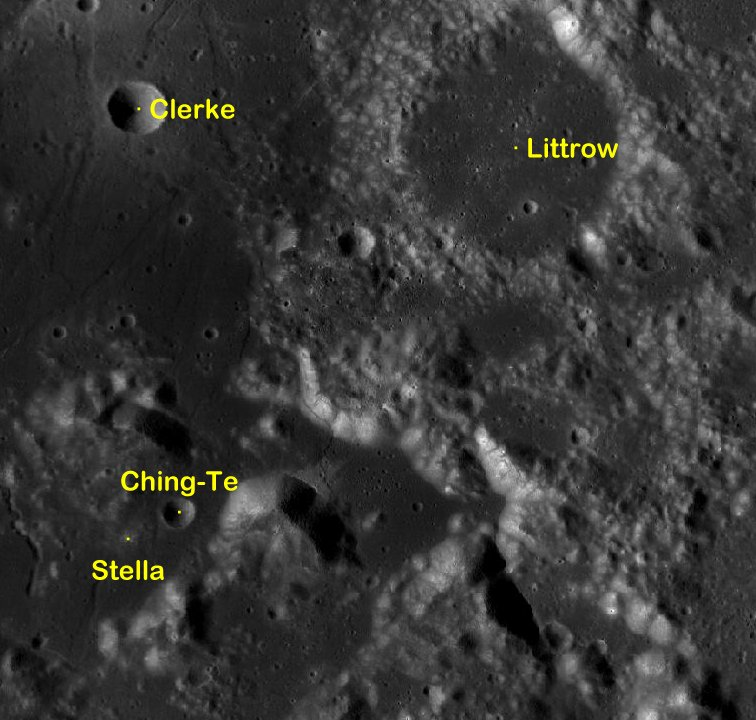
Littrow and three other surrounding craters to the west

The rim of Littrow is heavily worn and eroded, especially along the southern wall. The interior has been flooded with lava in the past, leaving a relatively smooth, featureless surface with no central rise.

== Rimae Littrow ==
Just to the northwest of Littrow is a system of rilles designated the Rimae Littrow. These are located at selenographic coordinates 22.1° N, 29.9° E, and have a maximum diameter of 115 km. To the south-southwest is the Taurus–Littrow valley that is notable for being the landing site of the Apollo 17 mission.

Part of Rimae Littrow (northwest of the crater Clerke) was considered for a landing site of an early Apollo mission, primarily because the mare materials in the area are anomalously dark, and also because there are abundant wrinkle ridges in the area. The site would have been the landing site of Apollo 14 had Apollo 13 succeeded in landing in the Fra Mauro formation lunar highlands. Apollo 14 was redirected there following the failure of Apollo 13 to make a lunar landing.

== Satellite craters ==
By convention these features are identified on lunar maps by placing the letter on the side of the crater midpoint that is closest to Littrow.

Littrow	Latitude	Longitude	Diameter
A	22.2° N	32.2° E	23 km
D	23.7° N	32.8° E	8 km
F	22.0° N	34.1° E	12 km
P	23.2° N	32.8° E	36 km

The following craters have been renamed by the IAU.

- Littrow B — See Clerke (crater).

== Catena Littrow ==
There is a catena (crater chain), named after crater Littrow.
