= Mare Serenitatis =

Lunar mare

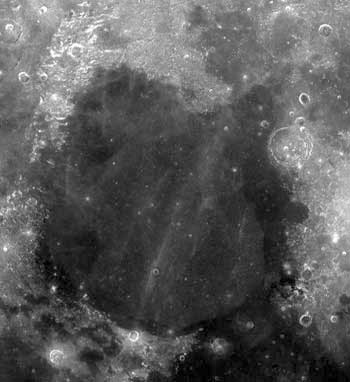
- Photograph of Mare Serenitatis
- Coordinates: 28.0°N 17.5°E
- Diameter: 674 km (419 mi)
- Eponym: Sea of Serenity

Mare Serenitatis /sɪˌrɛnɪˈteɪtɪs/ (Latin serēnitātis, the "Sea of Serenity") is a lunar mare located to the east of Mare Imbrium on the Moon. Its diameter is 674 km (419 mi).

== Geology ==
Mare Serenitatis is located within the Serenitatis basin, which is of the Nectarian epoch. The material surrounding the mare is of the Lower Imbrian epoch, while the mare material is of the Upper Imbrian epoch. The mare basalt covers a majority of the basin and overflows into Lacus Somniorum to the northeast. The most noticeable feature is the crater Posidonius on the northeast rim of the mare. The ring feature to the west of the mare is indistinct, except for Montes Haemus. Mare Serenitatis connects with Mare Tranquillitatis to the southeast and borders Mare Vaporum to the southwest. Mare Serenitatis is an example of a mascon, an anomalous gravitational region on the Moon.

A mass concentration (mascon), or gravitational high, was identified in the center of Mare Serenitatis from Doppler tracking of the five Lunar Orbiter spacecraft in 1968. The mascon was confirmed and mapped at higher resolution with later orbiters such as Lunar Prospector and GRAIL.

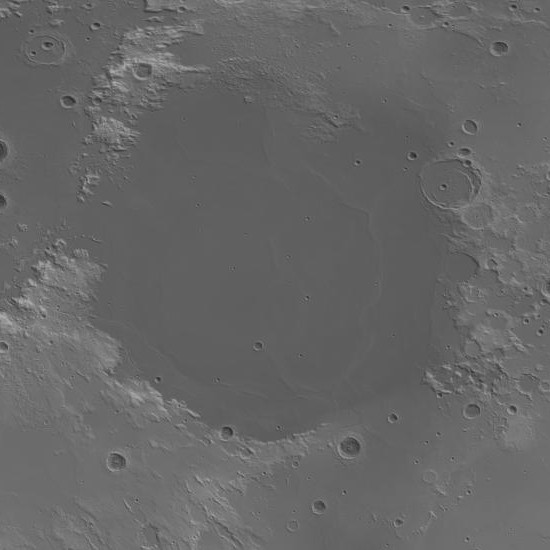
Topographic map

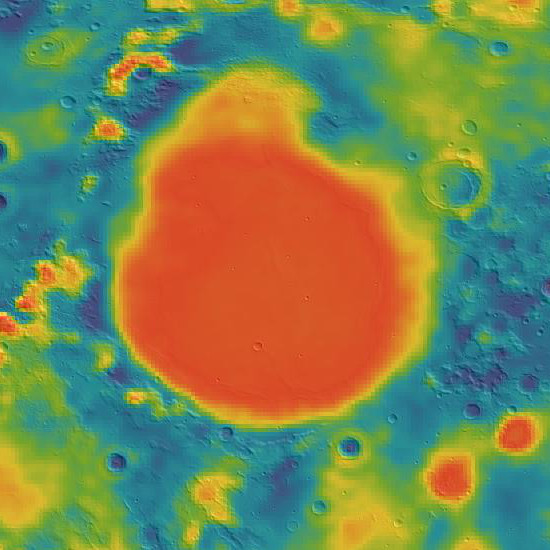
Gravity map based on GRAIL

== Names ==
Like most of the other maria on the Moon, Mare Serenitatis was named by Giovanni Riccioli, whose 1651 nomenclature system has become standardized. Previously, William Gilbert had cited it as within the Regio Magna Occidentalis ("Large Western Region") in his map of c.1600. Pierre Gassendi had included it as part of the 'Homuncio' ('little man'), referring to a small humanoid figure that he could see among the maria; Gassendi also referred to it as 'Thersite' after Thersites, the ugliest warrior in the Trojan War. Michael van Langren had labelled it the Mare Eugenianum ("Eugenia's Sea") in his 1645 map, in honour of Isabella Clara Eugenia, queen of the Spanish Netherlands. And Johannes Hevelius included it within Pontus Euxinus (after the classical name for the Black Sea) in his 1647 map.

== Exploration ==
Both Luna 21 and Apollo 17 landed near the eastern border of Mare Serenitatis, in the area of the Montes Taurus range. Apollo 17 landed specifically in the Taurus-Littrow valley, and Luna 21 landed in Le Monnier crater. SpaceIL's Beresheet lunar lander was planned to land in Mare Serenitatis, but crashed into the surface on 11 April 2019. Its final resting place was about 33°N, 19°E, near to the centre of the mare.

Lunar nearside with major maria and craters labelled.

== Views ==
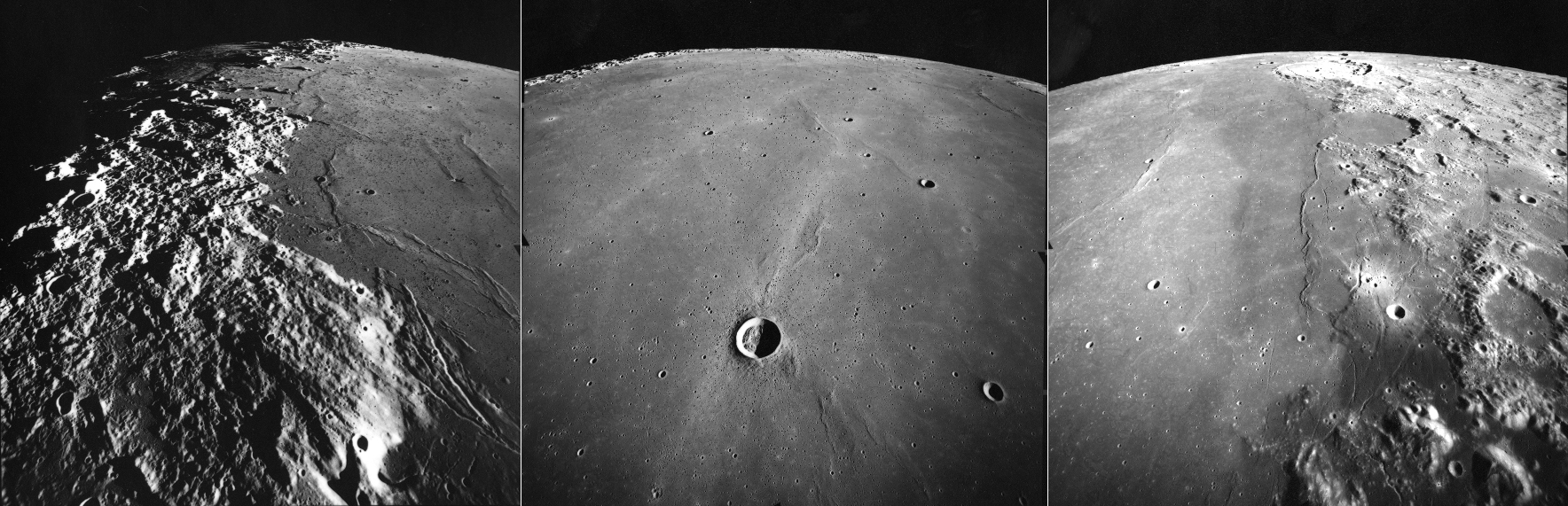
These are three views of Mare Serenitatis, taken by the mapping camera of the Apollo 17 mission in 1972, facing north-northeast from an average altitude of 107 km. At the right is the east margin of Mare Serenitatis, with the 95 km diameter crater Posidonius at the central horizon, the basalt-flooded Le Monnier crater to the south, the mare ridge (or wrinkle ridge) Dorsa Aldrovandi at center, Littrow crater at the right, and the landing site of Apollo 17 in the lower right corner in the Taurus–Littrow valley. In the center is the relatively small crater Bessel (16 km), and two prominent rays probably from the Tycho impact far to the south. At the left is the western margin of the mare, with the Caucasus Mountains at the central horizon, the Apennine Mountains at left, and the Sulpicius Gallus Rilles at the lower right. The Sun elevation drops from 24 degrees at right to 5 degrees at left as the Command Module America orbited the Moon.

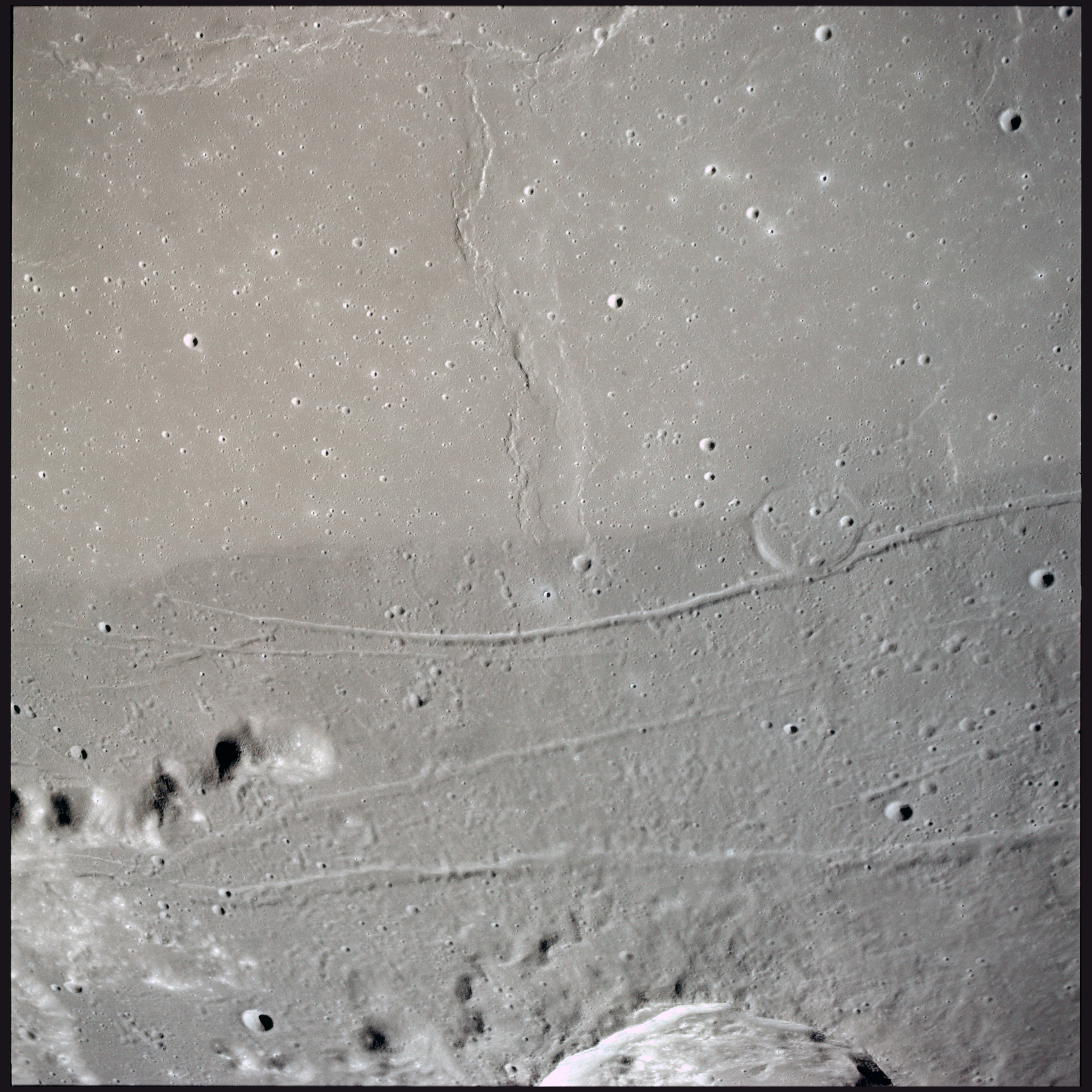
Some of the strongest tonal, color, and structural contrasts among mare materials occur in Mare Serenitatis. This color Apollo 17 image shows that the dark materials were emplaced before the lighter materials near the top.

== In popular culture ==
- Mare Serenitatis forms one of the eyes for the Man in the Moon.
- Mare Serenitatis is mentioned in Arthur C. Clarke's 1951 short story "The Sentinel".
- Most of the action in John Wyndham's 1933 short story "The Last Lunarians" takes place on the edge of the Sea of Serenity.
- Mare Serentitatis borders the Authority Moon colony in Robert Heinlein's 1966 novel The Moon Is a Harsh Mistress.
- The most southern part of Mare Serenitatis is depicted on the cover of the album Apollo - Atmospheres and Soundtracks by Brian Eno, Roger Eno, and Daniel Lanois (1982). The photograph on the cover is AS17-150-23069, made during the mission of Apollo 17 in December 1972.
- Mare Serenitatis is the name of a Frigate-type spaceship playable in Infinite Lagrange, a game developed and published by NetEase Games.
- In the Sailor Moon manga and anime series, Mare Serenitatis is the location of Silver Millennium and the original Moon Castle.

== See also ==
- Volcanism on the Moon
