= Keldysh =

Keldysh (Russian: Келдыш) may refer to:

== Science ==
- Keldysh formalism, for studying non-equilibrium quantum systems
- Akademik Mstislav Keldysh, a 1980 Russian scientific research vessel renowned for its visits to the wreck of the RMS Titanic
- Keldysh Institute of Applied Mathematics, a Russian research institute
- Keldysh (crater), a crater on the Moon
- 2186 Keldysh, an asteroid

== People ==
- Leonid Keldysh (1931–2016), Russian physicist, former director of the Lebedev Physical Institute (1988–1994), later a member of the physics faculty at Texas A&M University
- Mstislav Keldysh (1911–1978), Russian mathematician, president of the Soviet Academy of Sciences (1961–1978)
- Lyudmila Keldysh (1904–1976), mathematician, sister of Mstislav, wife of Pyotr Novikov
