= Williams (lunar crater) =

Crater on the Moon

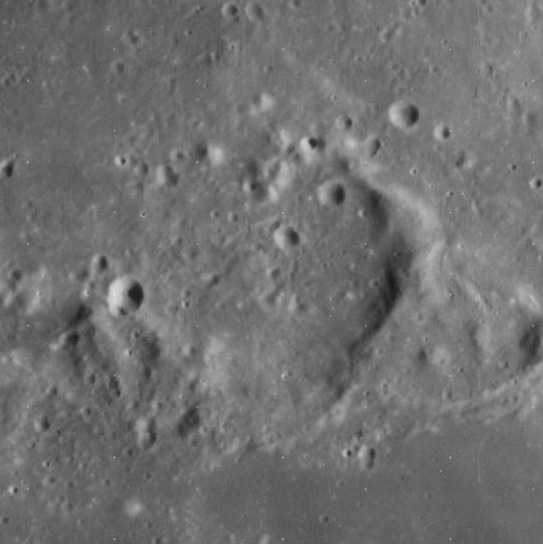
- Lunar Orbiter 4 image
- Coordinates: 42.0°N 37.2°E
- Diameter: 36 km
- Depth: 0.7 km
- Colongitude: 323° at sunrise
- Eponym: Arthur S. Williams

Williams is the remnant of a lunar impact crater that lies to the south of the prominent crater Hercules, in the northeastern part of the Moon. The southern rim borders the Lacus Somniorum, a small lunar mare that extends to the south and west. To the southwest is the sharp-rimmed crater Grove.

Little remains of the original crater, besides a low curving ridge. The rim has been nearly destroyed along the northwest face, leaving only a few ridges in the surface. The remainder forms an irregular horseshoe, with the western part attached to a series of ridges leading to the west. The interior floor has been resurfaced by basaltic lava, forming a flat, nearly featureless surface that is marked only by a pair of tiny craters near the northeast rim.

== Satellite craters ==
By convention these features are identified on lunar maps by placing the letter on the side of the crater midpoint that is closest to Williams.

Williams	Latitude	Longitude	Diameter
F	43.5° N	38.2° E	7 km
M	41.2° N	38.8° E	5 km
N	42.1° N	36.3° E	5 km
R	42.5° N	38.3° E	4 km
