= Chernavsky =

Chernavsky (masculine, Russian: Чернавский) or Chernavskaya (feminine, Russian: Чернавская) is a Russian-language surname. Notable people with the surname include:

- Aleksei Chernavskii (1938–2023), Russian mathematician
- Yury Chernavsky (1947–2025), Russian producer, composer, and songwriter
