= Lake of Dreams =

Lake of Dreams may refer to:

- Lacus Somniorum, a plain on the Moon
- Lake of Dreams, a multimedia show at Resorts World Sentosa in Sentosa, Singapore
- Lake of Dreams, a multimedia show at Wynn Las Vegas in Las Vegas, Nevada, U.S.
