= Hercules (crater) =

Crater on the Moon

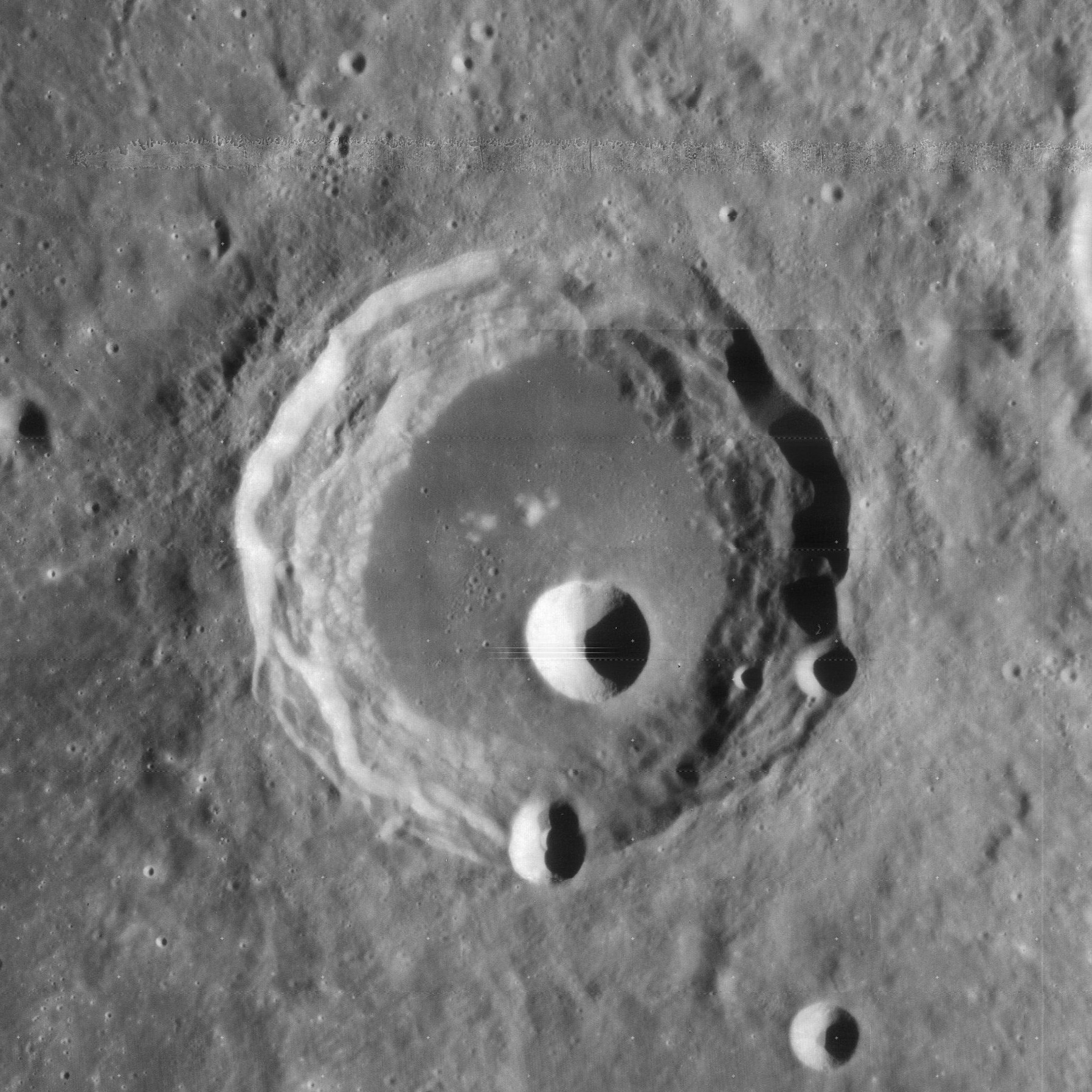
- Mosaic of Lunar Orbiter 4 images
- Coordinates: 46.82°N 39.21°E
- Diameter: 68.32 km
- Depth: 3.2 km
- Colongitude: 322° at sunrise
- Formation: Eratosthenian
- Eponym: Hercules

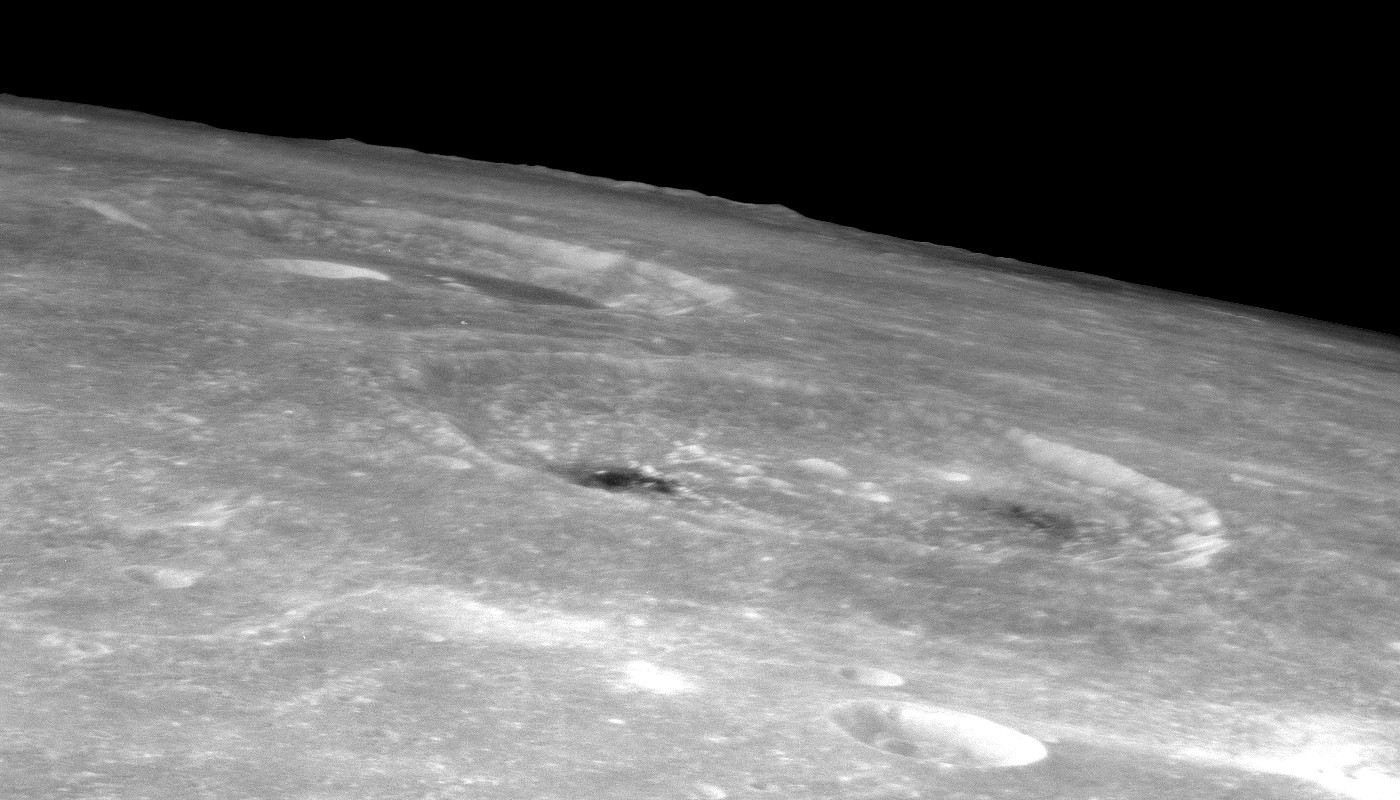
Oblique view of Atlas and Hercules from Apollo 16

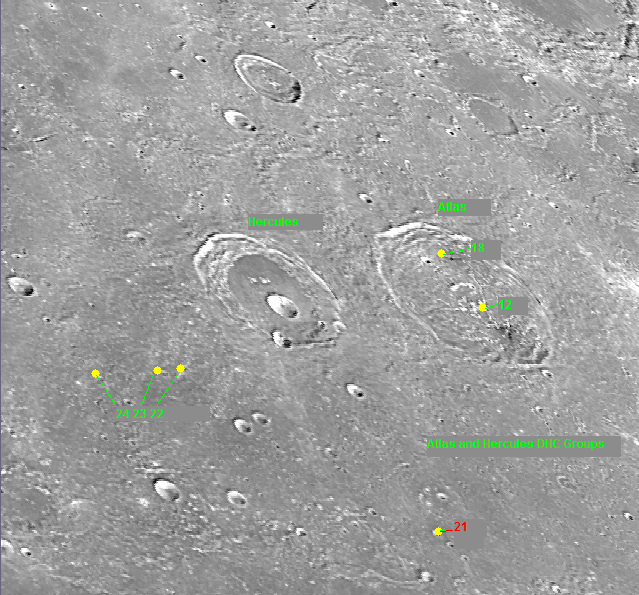
Atlas (upper right) and Hercules (lower left) Lunar craters

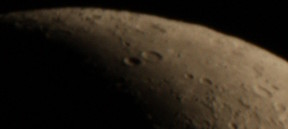
Atlas and Hercules at center, near the terminator as viewed from Earth

Hercules is a prominent crater located in the northeast part of the Moon, to the west of the crater Atlas. It lies along the east edge of a southward extension in the Mare Frigoris. To the west across the mare is Bürg. To the south is the ruined crater Williams.

On the lunar geologic timescale, Hercules is a crater of Eratosthenian age. The interior walls of Hercules have multiple terraces, and there is a small outer rampart. The crater floor has been flooded by lava in the past, and contains several areas of low albedo. The central peak has been buried, leaving only a low hill near the midpoint. The satellite crater Hercules G is located prominently just to the south of the center. The small crater Hercules E lies along the southern rim of Hercules.

The name Hercules was formally recognized by the IAU in 1935.

Since 1900, this crater has been reported as the site of one instance of transient lunar phenomenon.

== Satellite craters ==
By convention these features are identified on lunar maps by placing the letter on the side of the crater midpoint that is closest to Hercules.

Hercules	Latitude	Longitude	Diameter
B	47.8° N	36.6° E	9 km
C	42.7° N	35.3° E	9 km
D	44.8° N	39.7° E	8 km
E	45.7° N	38.5° E	9 km
F	50.3° N	41.7° E	14 km
G	46.4° N	39.2° E	14 km
H	51.2° N	40.9° E	7 km
J	44.1° N	36.4° E	8 km
K	44.2° N	36.9° E	7 km

The following craters have been renamed by the IAU.

- Hercules A — See Keldysh.
