= RV Andromedae =

Star in the constellation Andromeda

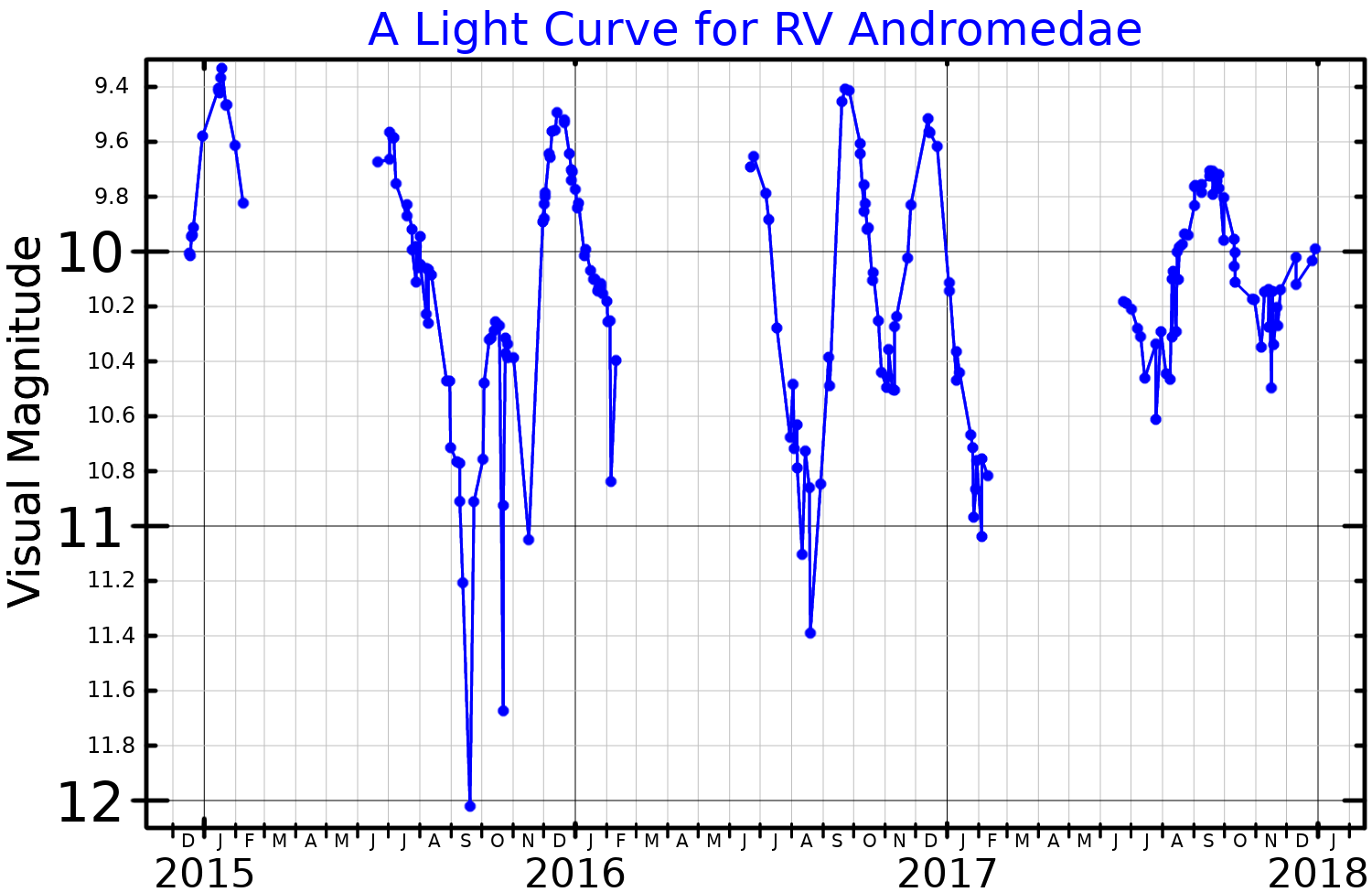
- The visual band light curve of RV Andromedae, plotted from ASAS-SN data

Observation data Epoch J2000 Equinox J2000
- Constellation: Andromeda
- Right ascension: 02^{h} 11^{m} 02.56581^{s}
- Declination: 48° 56′ 45.0634″
- Apparent magnitude (V): 9.0–11.5

Characteristics
- Spectral type: M4e
- B−V color index: 1.607
- Variable type: Semi-regular

Astrometry
Radial velocity (R_{v})	−10.0±2.0 km/s
Proper motion (μ)	RA: 10.456(48) mas/yr Dec.: −0.958(56) mas/yr
Parallax (π)	1.0950±0.0483 mas
Distance	3,000 ± 100 ly (910 ± 40 pc)

Other designations
- BD+48 616, HIP 10192

Database references
SIMBAD	data

RV Andromedae is a variable star in the constellation of Andromeda. It is classified as a semiregular variable pulsating giant star, and varies from an apparent visual magnitude of 11.5 at minimum brightness to a magnitude of 9.0 at maximum brightness, with a period of approximately 168.9 days.

In 1904, English amateur astronomer Arthur Stanley Williams examined photographic plates taken during the previous two years and determined that RV Andromedae was a variable star whose period he estimated to be 182 days. In 1907, Annie Jump Cannon listed it with its variable star designation in her Second Catalogue of Variable Stars.

This is one of the Mira variables where mode switching of pulsations have been observed; amplitude and periods have been seen decreasing and subsequently increasing back to values near the previous ones.
