= Alexandr Mishchenko =

Russian mathematician (born 1941)

Alexandr Sergeevich Mishchenko (Russian: Александр Сергеевич Мищенко; born August 18, 1941, in Rostov-on-Don) is a Russian mathematician, specializing in differential geometry and topology and their applications to mathematical modeling in the biosciences.

== Education and career ==
After completing undergraduate study in 1965 in the Faculty of Mechanics and Mathematics of Moscow State University, Mishchenko became a graduate student in the Department of Higher Geometry and Topology of the same Faculty and graduated there in 1968 with Candidate of Sciences degree (PhD). His PhD thesis K-теория на категории бесконечных комплексов (K-theory on the category of infinite complexes) was supervised by Sergei Novikov. In 1973 Mishchenko received his Russian Doctor of Sciences degree (habilitation) with thesis Гомотопические инварианты неодносвязных многообразий (Homotopy invariants of non-simply connected varieties).

Mishchenko is since 1979 a full professor in the Department of Higher Geometry and Topology, Faculty of Mechanics and Mathematics, Moscow State University. He also works at the Steklov Institute of Mathematics. His research deals with geometry and topology, application of algebraic and functional methods in the theory of smooth varieties with non-commutative geometry and topology, and applications of geometry and topology to mathematical modeling in ecology, molecular biology, bioinformatics. He has done some research on the history of mathematics, mathematical education, and the history of teaching mathematics. He is the author or coauthor of over 100 research articles.

In 1970, he was an Invited Speaker at the International Congress of Mathematicians in Nice. In 1971 he was awarded, jointly with Victor Buchstaber, the Moscow Mathematical Society Prize for research on the K-theory of infinite-dimensional CW-complexes. In 1996 Mischenko, jointly with Anatoly Fomenko, was awarded the State Prize of the Russian Federation in the field of science and technology for a series of works involving investigation of invariants of smooth manifolds and Hamiltonian dynamical systems. In 2006 Mishchenko was awarded the title of Honored Professor of Moscow State University.

== Selected publications ==
=== Articles ===
- Mishchenko, A. S. (1971). "Integral geodesics of a flow on Lie groups". Functional Analysis and Its Applications. 4 (3): 232–235. doi:10.1007/BF01075243. S2CID 121952895.
- Miščenko, A. S. (1974). "Infinite-dimensional representations of discrete groups, and higher signatures". Izvestiya: Mathematics. 8 (1): 85. Bibcode:1974IzMat...8...85M. doi:10.1070/IM1974v008n01ABEH002097. Izv. Akad. Nauk SSSR Ser. Mat. 38, 81–106 (1974)
- Mishchenko, A. S.; Fomenko, A. T. (1978). "Generalized Liouville method of integration of Hamiltonian systems". Functional Analysis and Its Applications. 12 (2): 113–121. doi:10.1007/BF01076254. S2CID 121557031.
- Mishchenko, A. S.; Fomenko, A. T. (1978). "Euler equations on finite-dimensional Lie groups". Izvestiya Rossiiskoi Akademii Nauk. Seriya Matematicheskaya. 42 (2): 396–415. Bibcode:1978IzMat..12..371M. doi:10.1070/IM1978v012n02ABEH001859.
- Mishchenko, A.S. (1979). "C^{*}-algebras and K-theory". In: Algebraic topology, Aarhus 1978 (Proc. Sympos., Univ. Aarhus, Aarhus, 1978). Lecture Notes in Math., vol. 763. Berlin: Springer. pp. 262–274.
- Mishchenko, A. S.; Fomenko, A. T. (1979). "The index of elliptic operators over C^{*}-algebras". Izvestiya Rossiiskoi Akademii Nauk. Seriya Matematicheskaya. 43 (4): 831–859.
- Manuilov, V. M.; Mishchenko, A. S. (2001). "Almost, asymptotic and Fredholm representations of discrete groups". Acta Applicandae Mathematicae. 68: 159–210. doi:10.1023/A:1012077015181. S2CID 117563048.
- Arutyunov, A. A.; Mishchenko, A. S. (2019). "A smooth version of Johnson's problem on derivations of group algebras". Sbornik: Mathematics. 210 (6): 756–782. arXiv:1801.03480. Bibcode:2019SbMat.210..756A. doi:10.1070/SM9119. S2CID 59055245.

=== Books ===
- with coauthors: Метод канонического оператора в прикладной математике (The method of the canonical operator in applied mathematics). 1974.
- with coauthors: Метод канонического оператора Маслова. Комплексная теория (The method of the canonical operator Maslov. Complex theory). 1974.
- with coauthors: С^{*}-алгебры и К-теория (C^{*}-algebras and K-theory). 1979.
- with coauthors: Курс дифференциальной геометрии и топологии (Course in differential geometry and topology). 1980.
- with coauthors: Сборник задач по дифференциальной геометрии и топологии (Collection of problems in differential geometry and topology). 1981.
- Векторные расслоения и их применения (Vector bundles and their applications). 1984.
- Shatalov, V. E.; Mishchenko, A. V.; Sternin, B. Yu. (1990). Lagrangian manifolds and the Maslow operator, (translated from the Russian by Dana Mackenzie.). Berlin; Heidelberg; New York: Springer-Verlag; Russian original published in 1978
- Краткий курс дифференциальной геометрии и топологии (A short course in differential geometry and topology). 2004.
- Luke, Glenys; Mishchenko, Alexander S. (9 March 2013). Vector Bundles and Their Applications. Springer. ISBN 9781475769234.
