= Lacus Mortis =

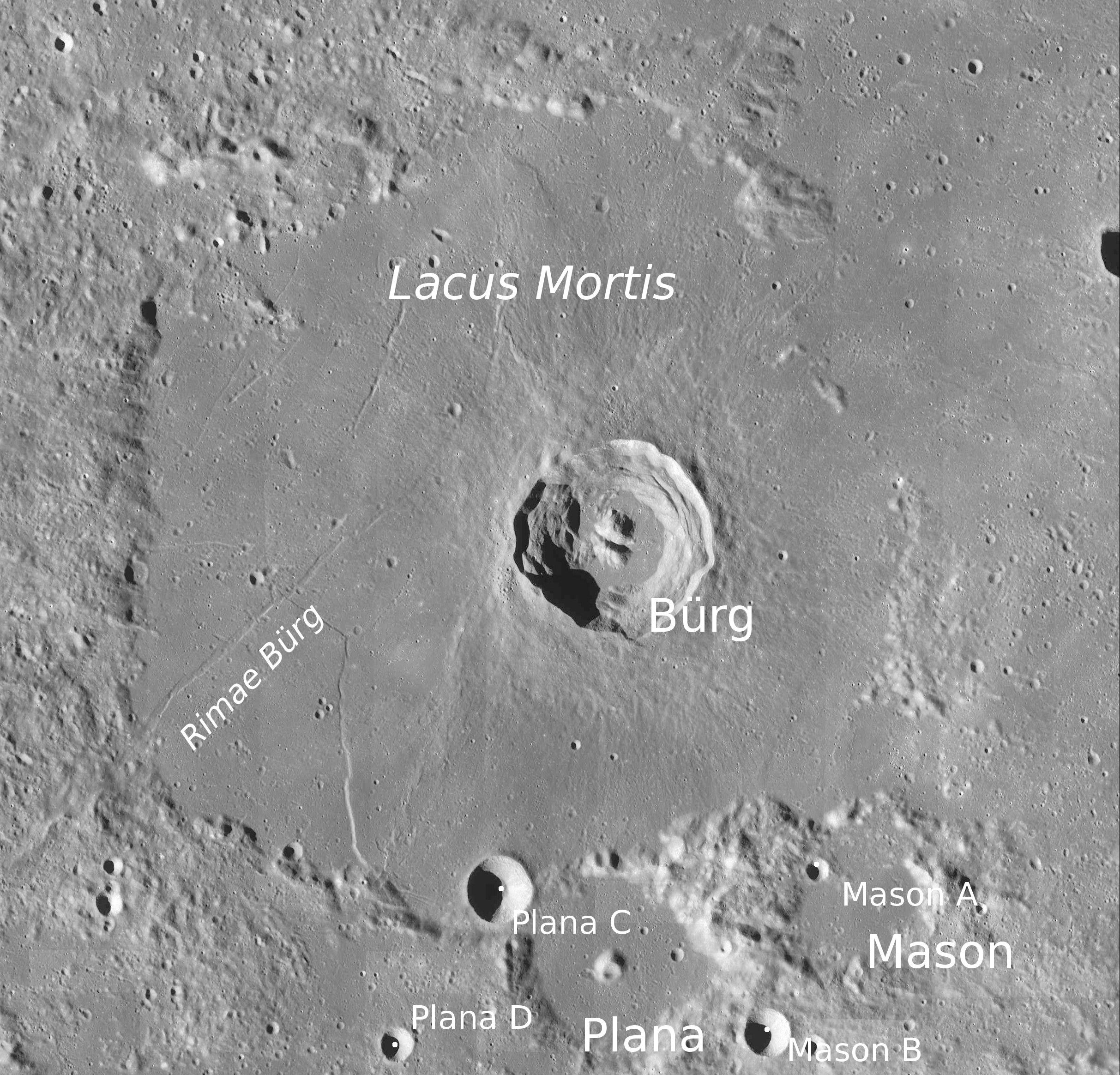
- Lacus Mortis with crater Bürg
- Coordinates: 45.13°N 27.32°E
- Diameter: 158.78 km
- Eponym: Lake of Death

Lacus Mortis /ˈleɪkəs ˈmɔːrtɪs/ (Latin mortis, "Lake of Death") is a hexagonal-shaped plain of basaltic lava flows in the northeastern part of the Moon's near face. It was formed as a floor-fractured crater during the pre-Imbrian epoch, then flooded during the late Imbrian period. This feature lies just to the south of the elongated Mare Frigoris, being separated by a slender arm of rugged ground and linked at the eastern extreme. To the south is the Lacus Somniorum, separated from this mare by the joined craters Plana and Mason, and a strip of uneven surface.

The name of this feature originated with the lunar nomenclature of Giovanni Riccioli, published in 1651 with the Almagestum Novum. It was officially adopted by the IAU in 1935. The selenographic coordinates of the Lacus Mortis are 45.13° N, 27.32° E, and it has a diameter of 158.78 km (98.66 mi). The feature is positioned between lunar latitudes 42.5° to 47.75° north, and longitudes 23.61° to 31.03° east.

The western edge of this mare forms a straight line, while the eastern edge is heavily eroded with open gaps. Located prominently just to the east of the midpoint of this feature is the 40 km diameter impact crater Bürg. This was formed during the Copernican period around 800 million years ago. A pair of low ridges run north and south from Bürg crater to the mare rim. The mare basalts, including those in the neighboring region of Mare Frigoris, are found to be richer in magnesium oxide (MgO) and aluminium oxide (Al_{2}O_{3}) compared to typical mare regions of the Moon, while iron oxide (FeO) is comparatively low in abundance. A section of mare to the east of Bürg crater includes low concentrations of titanium oxide; less than 1.5% by concentration. It was likely delivered here as ejecta from a crater impact.

The western part of the Lacus Mortis contains an extensive system of criss-crossing rilles collectively designated Rimae Bürg, spanning a length of 140 km. The rilles are suspected to have formed from lava tubes. There is a collapsed pit crater to the west of Bürg, at 44.96°N, 25.62°E, which may be an opening into a lava tube or cave. This is the largest mare pit found as of 2012, measuring 100 × 150 m, with a floor about 90 m below the surrounding mare. The eastern wall of this pit appears to have collapsed, leaving a ramp with a ~22° slope extending from the mare to the floor. Two small volcanoes are positioned along the southwest border of the mare with the highlands, to the south of a linear rille. They have a diameter of about 1.5 km and are similar in appearance to cinder or scoria cones on the Earth.

== Gallery ==
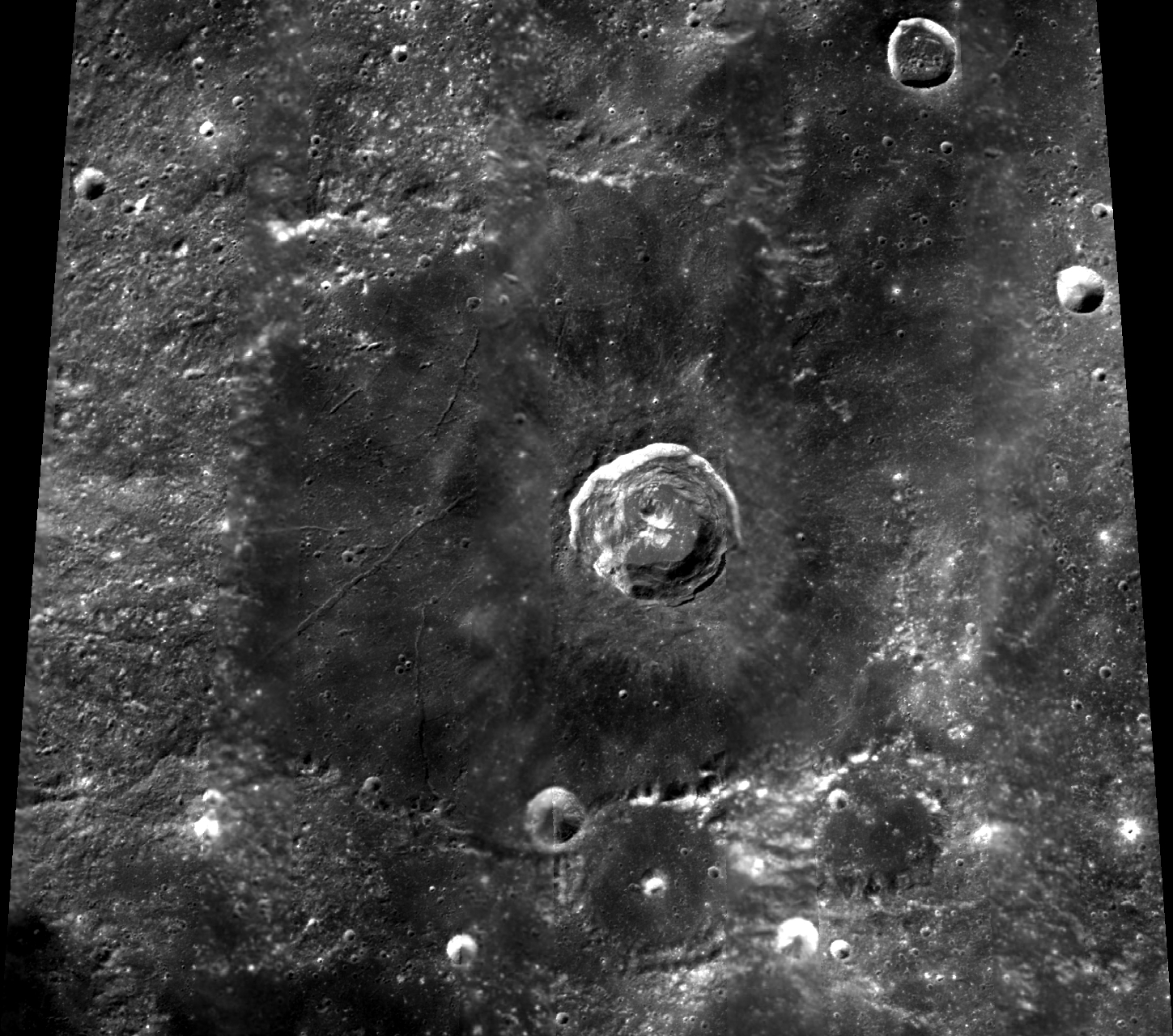
Clementine mosaic of the Lacus Mortis region

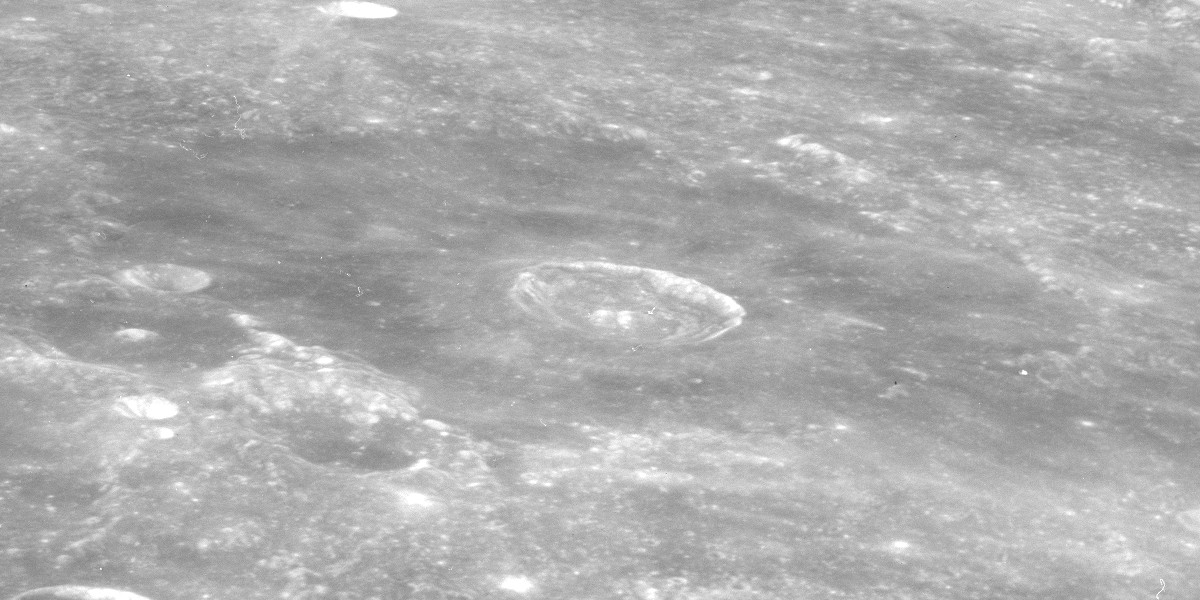
Oblique view from Apollo 16

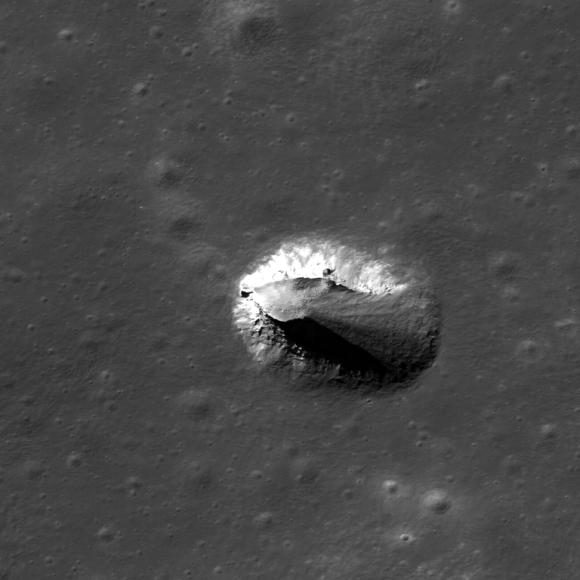
This pit on Lacus Mortis has a collapsed eastern wall that could serve as a ramp

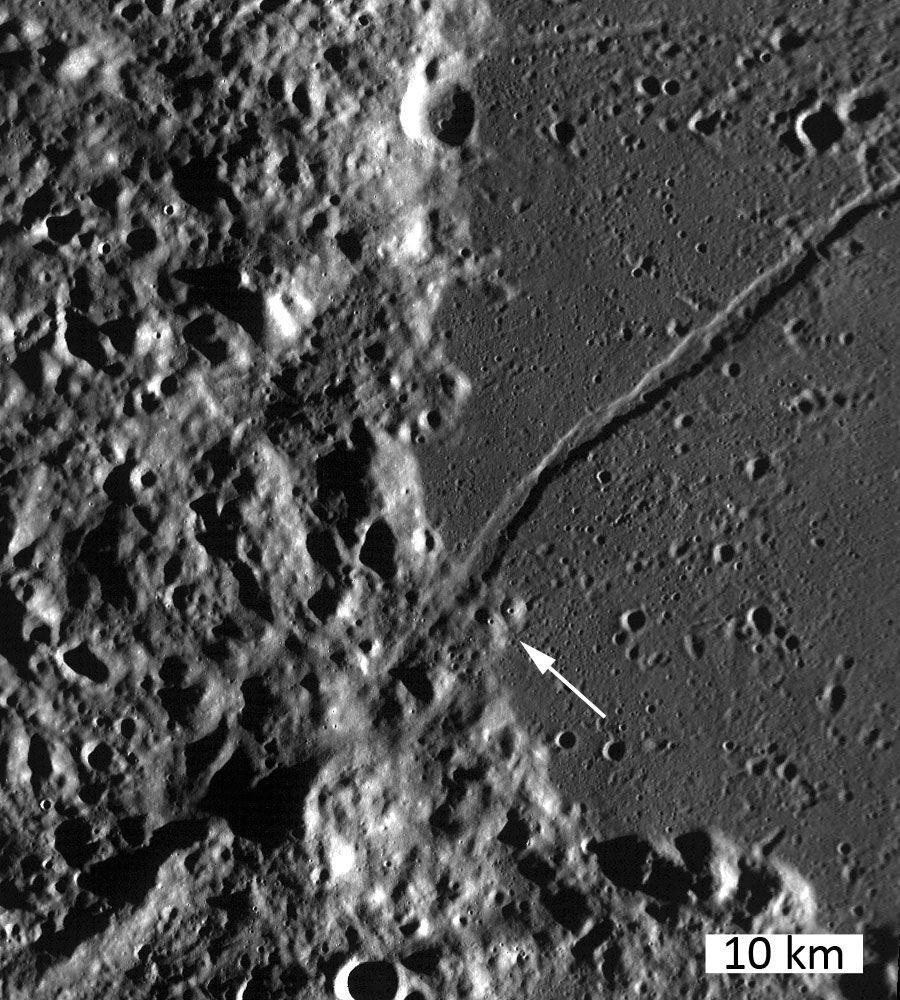
The arrow points to lava domes to the south of a linear rille

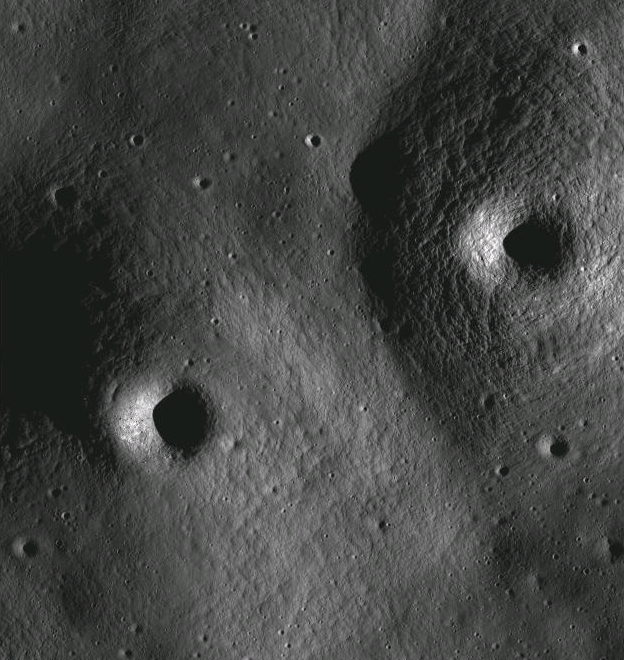
Closeup view of lava domes

== See also ==
- Dead Lake (disambiguation), Earth.
- Volcanism on the Moon
