= Mikhail Shubin (mathematician) =

Russian American mathematician (1944–2020)

Mikhail A. Shubin
- Born: December 19, 1944; Samara, Soviet Union
- Died: May 13, 2020 (aged 75); Boston, United States
- Education: Moscow State University
- Known for: Novikov–Shubin invariants Spectral theory and almost periodic coefficients Fellow of the American Mathematical Society
- Awards: Matthews Distinguished University Professor, Northeastern University (from 2001)
- Scientific career
- Fields: Differential equations Spectral Theory; Mathematical Physics
- Workplaces: Moscow State University; Massachusetts Institute of Technology; Northeastern University
- Doctoral advisor: Mark Vishik

Mikhail Aleksandrovich Shubin (19 December 1944 – 13 May 2020) was an American and Soviet mathematician and professor at Northeastern University, as well as a Fellow of the American Mathematical Society. He died in May 2020 at the age of 75.

== Work ==
Shubin has written over 140 papers and books, and supervised almost twenty doctoral theses.

In 2012 he became a fellow of the American Mathematical Society.

== See also ==
- Novikov–Shubin invariant
