= Dead Lake =

Dead Lake may refer to:

- Dead Lake, a natural impoundment of the Chipola River in Florida
  - Dead Lakes Park, a county park on the above lake near Wewahitchka, Florida
- Dead Lake Township, Minnesota, a township in Otter Tail County, Minnesota, United States
- Dead Lake in Granite County, Montana
- Dead Lake (Uintah County, Utah)
- Lough Marrave ("Dead lake, or lake of death"), Ireland
- Victoria Park, Millbridge, Plymouth ("Deadlake"), United Kingdom

== See also ==
- Dead Sea
- Lacus Mortis ("Lake of Death"), on the Moon
