= Novikov–Shubin invariant =

In mathematics, a Novikov–Shubin invariant, introduced by Sergei Novikov and Mikhail Shubin (1986), is an invariant of a compact Riemannian manifold related to the spectrum of the Laplace operator acting on square-integrable differential forms on its universal cover.

The Novikov–Shubin invariant gives a measure of the density of eigenvalues around zero. It can be computed from a triangulation of the manifold, and it is a homotopy invariant. In particular, it does not depend on the chosen Riemannian metric on the manifold.
