= Sergei Novikov (mathematician) =

Soviet and Russian mathematician (1938–2024)

- Сергей Новиков
- Born: 20 March 1938; Gorky, Russian SFSR, USSR
- Died: 6 June 2024 (aged 86)
- Education: Moscow State University
- Known for: Adams–Novikov spectral sequence Novikov conjecture Novikov ring Novikov–Shubin invariant Novikov–Veselov equation Novikov's compact leaf theorem Wess–Zumino–Novikov–Witten model
- Parents: Pyotr Novikov (father); Lyudmila Keldysh (mother)
- Relatives: Mstislav Keldysh (uncle); Leonid Keldysh (step-brother)
- Awards: Lenin Prize (1967); Fields Medal (1970); Lobachevsky Medal (1981); Wolf Prize (2005); Lomonosov Gold Medal (2020)
- Scientific career
- Fields: Mathematics
- Workplaces: Moscow State University; Steklov Institute of Mathematics; University of Maryland
- Doctoral advisor: Mikhail Postnikov
- Doctoral students: Fedor Bogomolov; Victor Buchstaber; Boris Dubrovin; Sabir Gusein-Zade; Gennadi Kasparov; Alexandr Mishchenko; Iskander Taimanov; Anton Zorich

Sergei Petrovich Novikov (Note: His first name is also romanized as Serguei.) (Russian: Серге́й Петро́вич Но́виков [sʲɪrˈɡʲej pʲɪˈtrovʲɪtɕ ˈnovʲɪkəf]; 20 March 1938 – 6 June 2024) was a Soviet and Russian mathematician, noted for work in both algebraic topology and soliton theory. He became the first Soviet mathematician to receive the Fields Medal in 1970.

== Biography ==
Novikov was born on 20 March 1938 in Gorky, Soviet Union (now Nizhny Novgorod, Russia). He grew up in a family of talented mathematicians. His father was Pyotr Sergeyevich Novikov, who gave a negative solution to the word problem for groups. His mother, Lyudmila Vsevolodovna Keldysh, and maternal uncle, Mstislav Vsevolodovich Keldysh, were also important mathematicians.

Novikov entered Moscow State University in 1955 and graduated in 1960. In 1964, he received the Moscow Mathematical Society Award for young mathematicians and defended a dissertation for the Candidate of Science in Physics and Mathematics degree (equivalent to the PhD) under Mikhail Postnikov at Moscow State University. In 1965, he defended a dissertation for the Doctor of Science in Physics and Mathematics degree there.

Novikov died on 6 June 2024, at the age of 86.

== Career ==
In 1966, Novikov became a corresponding member of the Academy of Sciences of the Soviet Union. In 1971, he became head of the Mathematics Division of the Landau Institute for Theoretical Physics of the USSR Academy of Sciences. In 1983, Novikov was also appointed the head of the Department of Higher Geometry and Topology at Moscow State University. He became President of the Moscow Mathematical Society in 1985 and remained in that role until 1996, when he moved to the University of Maryland College of Computer, Mathematical, and Natural Sciences at the University of Maryland, College Park. He continued to maintain research appointments at the Landau Institute for Theoretical Physics, Moscow State University, and the Department of Geometry and Topology at the Steklov Mathematical Institute after his move to Maryland.

== Research ==
Novikov's early work was in cobordism theory, in relative isolation. Among other advances he showed how the Adams spectral sequence, a powerful tool for proceeding from homology theory to the calculation of homotopy groups, could be adapted to the new (at that time) cohomology theory typified by cobordism and K-theory. This required the development of the idea of cohomology operations in the general setting, since the basis of the spectral sequence is the initial data of Ext functors taken with respect to a ring of such operations, generalising the Steenrod algebra. The resulting Adams–Novikov spectral sequence is now a basic tool in stable homotopy theory.

Novikov also carried out important research in geometric topology, being one of the pioneers with William Browder, Dennis Sullivan, and C. T. C. Wall of the surgery theory method for classifying high-dimensional manifolds. He proved the topological invariance of the rational Pontryagin classes, and posed the Novikov conjecture. From about 1971, he moved to work in the field of isospectral flows, with connections to the theory of theta functions. Novikov's conjecture about the Riemann–Schottky problem (characterizing principally polarized abelian varieties that are the Jacobian of some algebraic curve) stated, essentially, that this was the case if and only if the corresponding theta function provided a solution to the Kadomtsev–Petviashvili equation of soliton theory. This was proved by Takahiro Shiota (1986), following earlier work by Enrico Arbarello and Corrado de Concini (1984), and by Motohico Mulase (1984).

== Awards and honours ==
In 1967, Novikov received the Lenin Prize. In 1970, Novikov became the first Soviet mathematician to be awarded the Fields Medal. He was not allowed to attend the award ceremony at the International Congress of Mathematicians in Nice by the Soviet government due to his support for people who had been arrested and sent to mental institutions for speaking out against the regime. In 2005, he was awarded the Wolf Prize for his contributions to algebraic topology, differential topology and to mathematical physics. He is one of just eleven mathematicians who received both the Fields Medal and the Wolf Prize. In 2020, he received the Lomonosov Gold Medal of the Russian Academy of Sciences.

In 1981, he was elected a full member of the USSR Academy of Sciences (Russian Academy of Sciences since 1991). He was elected to the London Mathematical Society (honorary member, 1987), Serbian Academy of Sciences and Arts (honorary member, 1988), Accademia dei Lincei (foreign member, 1991), Academia Europaea (member, 1993), National Academy of Sciences (foreign associate, 1994), Pontifical Academy of Sciences (member, 1996), European Academy of Sciences (fellow, 2003), and Montenegrin Academy of Sciences and Arts (honorary member, 2011).

He received honorary doctorates from the University of Athens (1988) and University of Tel Aviv (1999).

== Writings ==
- Novikov, S. P.; Fomenko, A. T. (1990). Basic Elements of Differential Geometry and Topology. Mathematics and Its Applications. Vol. 60. Dordrecht: Springer Netherlands. doi:10.1007/978-94-015-7895-0. ISBN 978-90-481-4080-0.
- Novikov, S. P.; Manakov, S. V.; Pitaevskii, L. P.; Zakharov, V. E. (1984). Theory of solitons: the inverse scattering method. New York: Consultants Bureau. ISBN 0-306-10977-8. OCLC 10071941.
- with Dubrovin and Fomenko: Modern geometry- methods and applications, Vol.1-3, Springer, Graduate Texts in Mathematics (originally 1984, 1988, 1990, V.1 The geometry of surfaces and transformation groups, V.2 The geometry and topology of manifolds, V.3 Introduction to homology theory)
- Topics in Topology and mathematical physics, AMS (American Mathematical Society) 1995
- Integrable systems – selected papers, Cambridge University Press 1981 (London Math. Society Lecture notes)
- Novikov, S. P.; Taimanov, I. A. (2007). Topological Library: Part 1: Cobordisms and Their Applications. Series on Knots and Everything. Vol. 39. Translated by Manturov, V. O. World Scientific. doi:10.1142/6379. ISBN 978-981-270-559-4.
- with V. I. Arnold as editor and co-author: Dynamical systems, 1994, Encyclopedia of mathematical sciences, Springer
- Topology I: general survey, V. 12 of Topology Series of Encyclopedia of mathematical sciences, Springer 1996; 2013 edition
- Solitons and geometry, Cambridge 1994
- as editor, with Buchstaber: Solitons, geometry and topology: on the crossroads, AMS, 1997
- with Dubrovin and Krichever: Topological and Algebraic Geometry Methods in contemporary mathematical physics V.2, Cambridge ISBN 9780415299190, OL 10188321M
- My generation in mathematics, Russian Mathematical Surveys V.49, 1994, p. 1 doi:10.1070/RM1994v049n06ABEH002446

== See also ==
- Novikov–Shubin invariant
- Novikov ring
- List of second-generation Mathematicians
