= Lyudmila Keldysh =

Soviet mathematician

- Born: Lyudmila Vsevolodovna Keldysh; 12 March 1904; Orenburg, Russian Empire
- Died: 16 February 1976 (aged 71); Moscow, Soviet Union
- Occupation: Mathematician
- Years active: 1930–1974
- Known for: Set theory and geometric topology
- Spouse: Pyotr Novikov
- Children: Leonid Keldysh; Sergei Novikov
- Relatives: Mstislav Keldysh (brother)

Lyudmila Vsevolodovna Keldysh (Russian: Людмила Всеволодовна Келдыш; 12 March 1904 – 16 February 1976) was a Soviet mathematician known for set theory and geometric topology. Her son, Sergei Novikov, was also a mathematician.

== Biography ==
Lyudmila Vsevolodovna Keldysh was born on 12 March 1904 in Orenburg, Russia to Mariya Aleksandrovna (née Skvortsova) and Vsevolod Mikhailovich Keldysh. Her family was descended from Russian nobility and though they were well-to-do before the Russian Revolution, they would later face difficulty because of their heritage. Because her father was a construction expert for the military, they moved frequently and she lived in Helsinki between 1905 and 1907, then in Saint Petersburg until 1909, and then moved to Riga, Latvia. Her younger brother was Mstislav Keldysh, later a physicist. Vsevolod took a position there at the Riga Polytechnic Institute, until the German invasion of 1915 forced the family to flee to Moscow, where they lived in the Losinoostrovsky District. Keldysh attended school, finishing her education in Ivanovo-Voznesensk, where the family had moved in 1918. She continued her education at the Moscow State University, graduating in 1925. While she was studying, she joined the research group of Nikolai Luzin in 1923, as did Pyotr Novikov, who she would later marry. Luzin published her first mathematical theory, which was an evaluation using continued fractions of the fourth Borel set in 1930.

Keldysh began teaching in 1930 at the Moscow Aviation Institute. Around this time, she had her first son, Leonid Keldysh, in 1931. In 1934, she left the Aviation Institute and began teaching at the Institute of the USSR Academy of Sciences specializing in set theories. That same year, she married Novikov and published three papers: On the Homeomorphism of Canonical Elements of the 3rd Class; On Simple Functions of Class a; and On the Structure of B Measurable Functions of Class a. The following year, Stalin began his purges and Keldysh lost both an uncle and a nephew, and her parents were both arrested, though later released. In the next few years, she had two more sons Andrei Petrovich Novikov and Sergei Petrovich Novikov (1938–2024), who would both become noted mathematicians. Sergei became the first Soviet mathematician to receive the Fields Medal.

She had continued her research on Borel sets and in 1941 defended her thesis, but before she received her degree the family fled the advancing German troops. Most of the faculty of the Institute of the Academy of Sciences were considered evacuees when they arrived in Kazan, but Keldysh and her three sons were treated as refugees. They found lodging in the gym of the Kazan University with several hundred other refugees, until Novikov arrived and the family was given a dorm room. Novikov was ill and required surgery, leaving Keldysh shuttling between her husband's hospital room and her children's dorm room.

In late 1942, they were able to return to Moscow. Keldysh had two daughters, Nina and then Elena, during this time. She published a paper, On the structure of measurable sets B in 1944, and followed it in 1945 with Open mappings of A-sets, which marked a turning point in her work. She was also finally able, in 1945, to have her thesis published and from this point on, her work focused more on geometric topology. She continued publishing from the mid-1940s into the 1960s. Keldysh's research was honored repeatedly in this period and she received the Order of the Red Banner of Labour, the Order of Maternal Glory in the 2nd degree and in 1958 received the Prize of the Presidium of the Supreme Soviet. In 1964, Keldysh was made a full professor at Moscow State University and in 1966 she published the book Topological embeddings into Euclidean space to help her students understand her lectures. She lectured until 1974, when she resigned in protest of the expulsion of one of her students. At the time, Novikov was ill and he died in January 1975. She died one year and one month later, on 16 February 1976 in Moscow.

Her doctoral students include A. V. Chernavskii.

== Bibliography ==
- Buchstaber, Victor M.; Krichever, Igor M. (2004). Geometry, Topology, and Mathematical Physics: Selected papers from S. P. Novikov's Seminar held in Moscow, 2002–2003. American Mathematical Society Translations, Series 2. Vol. 212. Providence, RI: American Mathematical Society. ISBN 978-0-8218-3613-2. MR 2070846.
