= Iskander Taimanov =

Russian mathematician (born 1961)

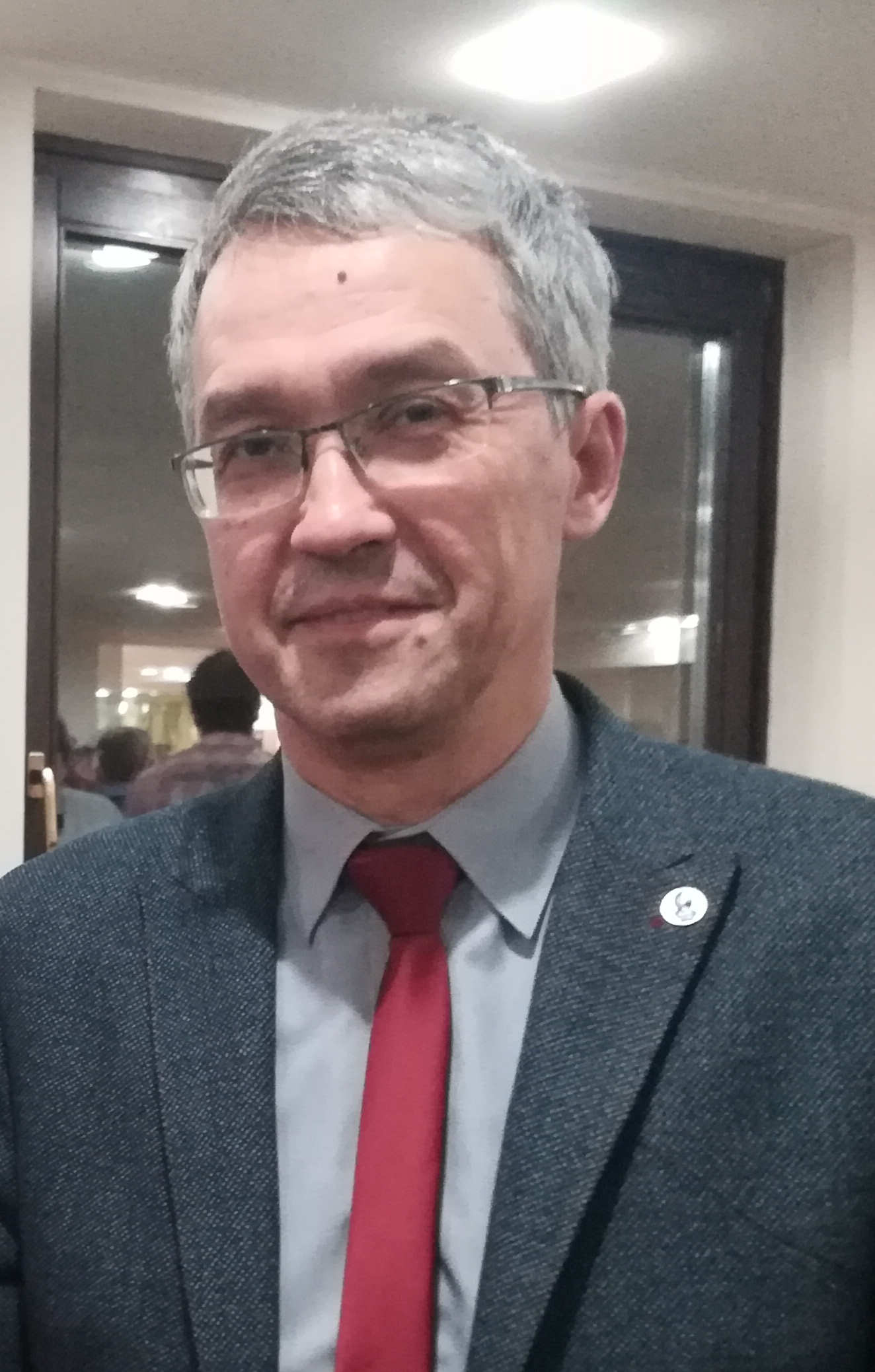
Iskander Taimanov

Iskander Asanovich Taimanov (born 20 December 1961, Искандер Асанович Тайманов) is a Russian mathematician whose research concerns geometry, calculus of variations, and soliton theory. He is the chair of the department of geometry and topology of Novosibirsk State University.

He is a member of the Russian Academy of Sciences.

He was a Ph.D. student of Sergey Petrovich Novikov.

Some topics of his work are Morse–Novikov theory and Willmore surfaces.

He is the author of the textbook Lectures on Differential Geometry.
