= Leonid Keldysh =

Russian physicist (1931–2016)

- Леонид Келдыш
- Born: Leonid Veniaminovich Keldysh; April 7, 1931; Moscow, RSFSR, Soviet Union
- Died: November 11, 2016 (aged 85); Moscow, Russia
- Citizenship: Russian
- Known for: Keldysh formalism Franz–Keldysh effect
- Mother: Lyudmila Keldysh
- Relatives: Pyotr Novikov (step-father); Mstislav Keldysh (uncle); Sergei Novikov (step-brother)
- Awards: EPS Europhysics Prize (1975); Rusnanoprize (2009); Lomonosov Gold Medal (2015)
- Scientific career
- Fields: Theoretical physics
- Workplaces: Lebedev Physical Institute
- Academic advisors: Vitaly Ginzburg
- Doctoral students: Yuri Kopaev

Leonid Veniaminovich Keldysh (Russian: Леонид Вениаминович Келдыш; 7 April 1931 – 11 November 2016) was a Soviet and Russian physicist. Keldysh was a professor in the I.E. Tamm Theory division of the Lebedev Physical Institute of the Russian Academy of Sciences in Moscow and a faculty member at Texas A&M University. He is known for developing the Keldysh formalism, a powerful quantum field theory framework designed to describe a system in a non-equilibrium state, as well as for the theory of excitonic insulators (Keldysh-Kopaev model, with Yuri Kopaev). Keldysh's awards include the 1975 EPS Europhysics Prize for his work on condensation of excitons,, the 2009 Rusnanoprize, an international nanotechnology award, for his work related to molecular-beam epitaxy, the 2011 Evgenii Feinberg Memorial Medal, and the 2015 Lomonosov Grand Gold Medal of the Russian Academy of Sciences.

Keldysh was a son of mathematician Lyudmila Keldysh. His uncle, Mstislav Keldysh, was a mathematician and the president of the Academy of Sciences of the Soviet Union. Sergei Novikov, a mathematician and a Fields medalist, is his step-brother.
