= Giovanni Plana =

Italian astronomer and mathematician (1781–1864)

Giovanni Antonio Amedeo Plana
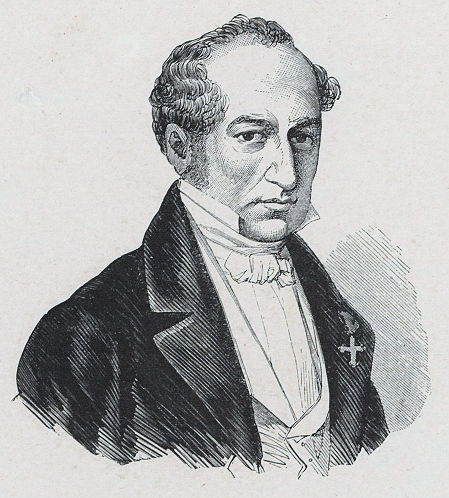
- Born: 6 November 1781; Voghera, Sardinia-Piedmont
- Died: 20 January 1864 (aged 82); Turin, Kingdom of Italy
- Education: École Polytechnique
- Known for: Abel–Plana formula
- Awards: Copley Medal (1834); Gold Medal of the Royal Astronomical Society (1840)
- Scientific career
- Fields: Astronomy; Mathematics
- Workplaces: University of Turin
- Academic advisors: Joseph-Louis Lagrange; Joseph Fourier

Giovanni Antonio Amedeo Plana (6 November 1781 – 20 January 1864) was an Italian astronomer and mathematician. He is considered one of the premiere Italian scientists of his age.

The crater Plana on the Moon is named in his honor.

== Biography ==
Plana was born in Voghera, Italy to Antonio Maria Plana and Giovanna Giacoboni. At the age of 15 he was sent to live with his uncles in Grenoble to complete his education. In 1800 he entered the École Polytechnique, and was one of the students of Joseph-Louis Lagrange. Joseph Fourier, impressed by Plana's abilities, managed to have him appointed to the chair of mathematics in a school of artillery in Piedmont in 1803, which came under the control of the French in 1805. In 1811 he was appointed to the chair of astronomy at the University of Turin thanks to the influence of Lagrange. He spent the remainder of his life teaching at that institution.

Plana's contributions included work on the motions of the Moon, as well as integrals, (including the Abel–Plana formula), elliptic functions, heat, electrostatics, and geodesy. In 1820 he was one of the winners of a prize awarded by the Académie des Sciences in Paris based on the construction of lunar tables using the law of gravity. In 1832 he published the Théorie du mouvement de la lune, the same year he was elected a Foreign Honorary Member of the American Academy of Arts and Sciences. In 1834 he was awarded with the Copley Medal by the Royal Society for his studies on lunar motion. Charles Babbage visited Turin in 1840 at the invitation of Giovanni Plana. Plana became astronomer royal, and then in 1844 a Baron. At the age of 80 he was granted membership in the prestigious French Academy of Sciences. Plana died in Turin on 20 January 1864, aged 82.

== Works ==
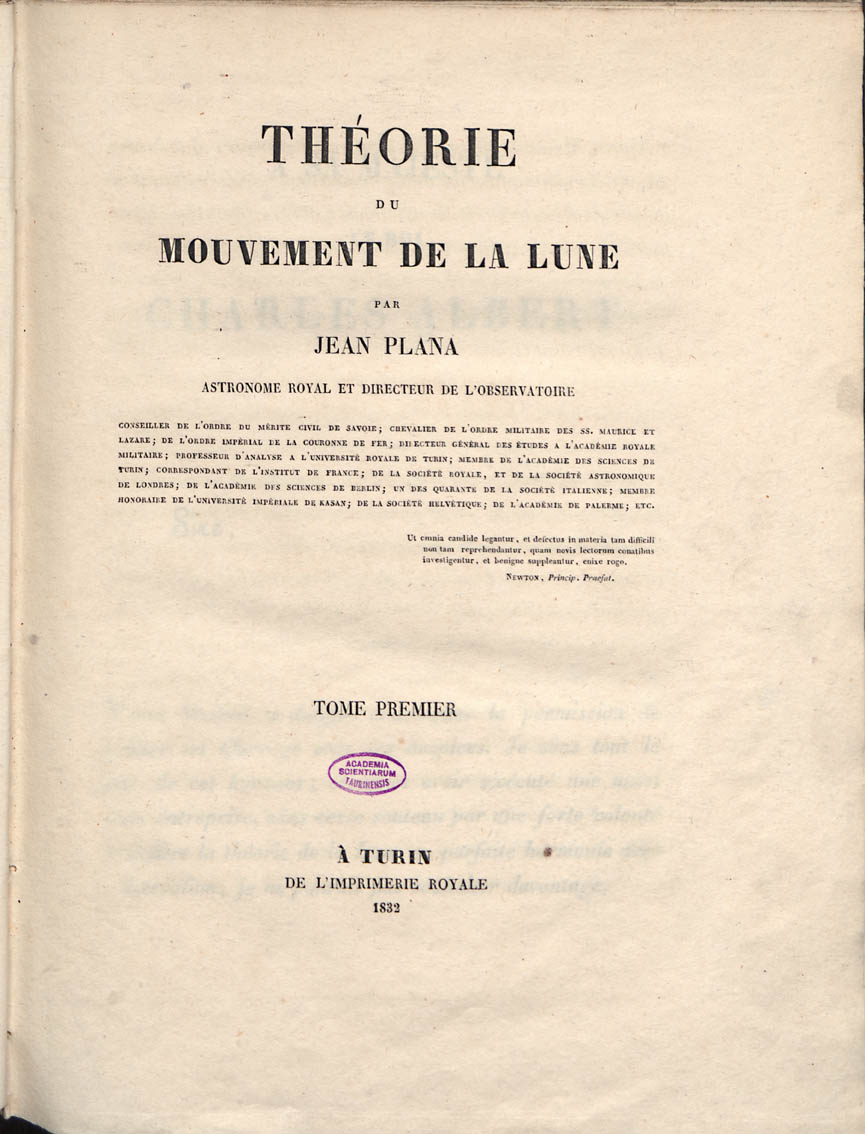
Théorie du mouvement de la lune, 1832

- Théorie du mouvement de la lune (in French). Vol. 1. Torino: Stamperia reale. 1832.
  - Théorie du mouvement de la lune (in French). Vol. 2. Torino: Stamperia reale. 1832.
  - Théorie du mouvement de la lune (in French). Vol. 3. Torino: Stamperia reale. 1832.
  - Recherches historiques sur la première explication de l'équation séculaire du moyen mouvement de la lune d'après le principe de la gravitation universelle (in French). Torino: Imprimerie Royale. 1857.
- Mémoire sur l'équation séculaire du moyen mouvement de la lune (in French). Torino: Imprimerie Royale. 1856.
- Sur la théorie de la Lune (in French). Torino: Imprimerie Royale. 1860.

== Bibliography ==
- O'Connor, John J.; Robertson, Edmund F., "Giovanni Plana", MacTutor History of Mathematics Archive, University of St Andrews
- Bianchi, Emilio (1935). "PLANA, Giovanni Antonio Amedeo". Enciclopedia Italiana. Rome: Istituto dell'Enciclopedia Italiana.
