= Mstislav Keldysh =

Soviet mathematician and engineer (1911–1978)

- Мстислав Келдыш
- Keldysh in 1971
- Born: 10 February 1911; Riga, Governorate of Livonia, Russian Empire (Now Latvia)
- Died: 24 June 1978 (aged 67); Moscow, Russian SFSR, Soviet Union
- Resting place: Kremlin Wall Necropolis
- Education: Moscow State University
- Relatives: Lyudmila Keldysh (sister); Pyotr Novikov (brother-in-law); Mstislav Keldysh (nephew); Leonid Keldysh (nephew)
- Awards: Hero of Socialist Labour (1956, 1961, 1971)
- Scientific career
- Fields: Mathematics
- Workplaces: Steklov Institute of Mathematics
- Doctoral advisor: Mikhail Lavrentyev
- Doctoral students: Sergey Mergelyan

Signature
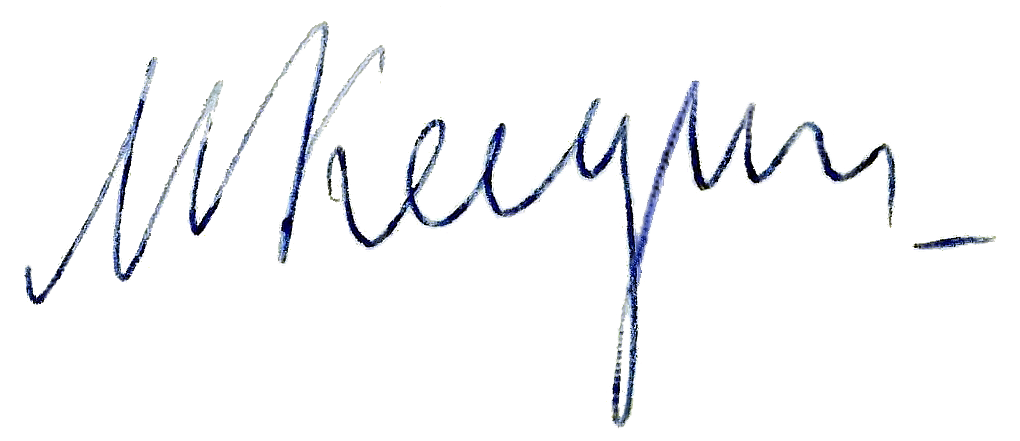

Mstislav Vsevolodovich Keldysh (Russian: Мстисла́в Все́володович Ке́лдыш; 10 February [O.S. 28 January] 1911 – 24 June 1978) was a Soviet mathematician who worked as an engineer in the Soviet space program.

He was the academician of the Academy of Sciences of the Soviet Union (1946), President of the Academy of Sciences of the Soviet Union (1961–1975), three-time Hero of Socialist Labour (1956, 1961, 1971), and fellow of the Royal Society of Edinburgh (1968). He was one of the key figures behind the Soviet space program. Among scientific circles of the USSR Keldysh was known by the epithet "the Chief Theoretician" in analogy with epithet "the Chief Designer" used for Sergei Korolev.

== Family ==
Keldysh was born to a professional family of Russian nobility. His grandfather, Mikhail Fomich Keldysh (1839–1920), was a military physician, who retired with the military rank of General. Keldysh's grandmother, Natalia Keldysh (née Brusilova), was a cousin of general Aleksei Brusilov. Keldysh's maternal grandfather, Alexander Nikolayevich Skvortsov, was a General of Infantry, and fought in the Caucasian War.

Keldysh's father, Vsevolod Mikhailovich Keldysh (1878–1965), was a civil engineer, Major General of the Engineering Service, and a full professor, teaching at the Kuybyshev Military Engineering Academy from 1918. He became a Distinguished Engineering Scientist of the Soviet Union (Заслуженный деятель науки и техники СССР) in 1944. He was one of the authors of contemporary methods for calculating the strength of reinforced concrete, and a designer of the Moscow Canal and Moscow Metro projects.

Several members of the Keldysh family were victims of political repressions. In the 1930s Keldysh's uncle was sent to a labor camp on the White Sea–Baltic Canal construction site. In 1935 Keldysh's mother was arrested but was released after a few weeks. It was a part of the campaign of collecting gold from the population, but after Keldysh's father brought all the jewelry the family had, the unsatisfied NKVD officer returned "all this garbage" back. Keldysh's brother Mikhail, a historian who specialized in Medieval Germany, was arrested in 1936 and executed in 1937 on suspicion of being a German spy. In 1938 another of Keldysh's brothers, Alexander, was arrested as a French spy. Alexander was spared because of the slight liberalization of the repressions during the transfer of the NKVD leadership from Nikolai Yezhov to Lavrentiy Beria, and was acquitted in the court.

The strongest influence on Keldysh was his older sister, Lyudmila Keldysh (1904–1976), a mathematician and Keldysh's first teacher. Among her children are Leonid Keldysh, director of Lebedev Physical Institute and Sergei Novikov, a mathematician.

== Biography ==
Keldysh was born in 1911 in Riga. When he was four the family evacuated to Moscow during the First World War. In the first years of the Soviet Union he was refused entrance to an Institute of Civil Engineers because of his attachment to a noble family. Later, he managed to enter and graduate from the Physics and Mathematics department of the Moscow State University. He obtained employment at the Central Aerohydrodynamic Institute (TsAGI) under Mikhail Lavrentyev and Sergey Chaplygin.

Working at TsAGI he explained the auto-oscillation effects of flutter (in-flight auto-induced oscillations and structural deformations), and shimmy (auto-oscillation in the nose-wheel of aircraft undercarriages while on the ground). The effects were responsible for many aircraft catastrophes at the time.

In 1937 Keldysh became Doctor of Science with his dissertation entitled Complex Variable and Harmonic Functions Representation by Polynomial Series, and was appointed a Professor of Moscow State University. In 1943 he became a Corresponding Member of the Academy of Sciences of the Soviet Union. He got his first Stalin Prize in 1946 for his works on aircraft auto-oscillations. In 1943 he also became a full member of the Academy and the Director of NII-1 (Research Institute number 1) of the Department of the Aviation Industry. He also headed the Department of Applied Mechanics of the Steklov Institute of Mathematics. In 1966 this department became an independent organization as the Institute of Applied Mathematics. After his death in 1978 it is named after him to become the Keldysh Institute of Applied Mathematics.

During the 1940s Keldysh became the leader of a group of applied mathematicians involved in almost all large scientific projects of the Soviet Union. Keldysh created the Calculation Bureau that carried most of the mathematical problems related to the development of nuclear weapons. The bureau is also credited with design of the first Soviet computers. In 1947 he became a member of the Communist Party.

Keldysh's main efforts were devoted to jet propulsion and rockets including supersonic gas dynamics, heat and mass exchange, and heat shielding. 1959 saw successful testing of the Soviet first cruise missile Burya.

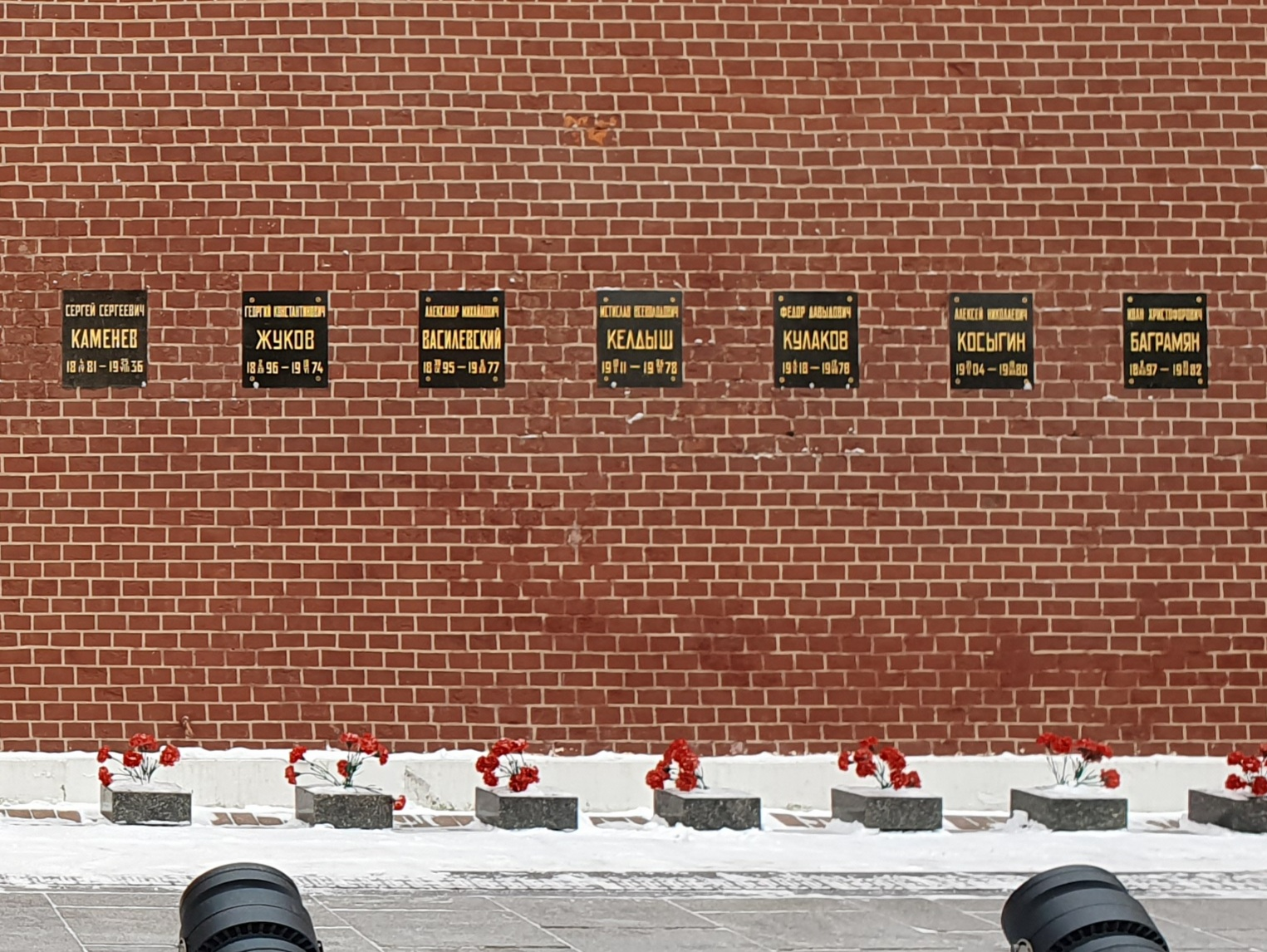
Keldysh's grave at the Kremlin Wall Necropolis

In 1954 Keldysh, Sergei Korolev and Mikhail Tikhonravov submitted a letter to the Soviet Government proposing development of an artificial satellite to orbit the Earth. The letter was rejected, and the group filed exaggerated Soviet newspaper articles which influenced American authorities to start satellite programs. This in turn began the effort that culminated in the world's first satellite, Sputnik 1 in October 1957, which marked the beginning of mankind's Space Age. In 1955 Keldysh was appointed chairman of the Satellite Committee at the Academy of Science. In recognition of his contribution to the problems of defense Keldysh was awarded the Hero of Socialist Labour (1956) and the Lenin Prize (1957). In 1961 he received a second Hеrо of Socialist Labour award for his contribution to Yuri Gagarin's flight into space, the first person to orbit the Earth.

In 1961 Keldysh was elected President of the Academy of Sciences and kept this position for 14 years. Concomitantly, he became a member of the Central Committee of the Communist Party of the Soviet Union. His last scientific works were devoted to creation of the Shuttle Buran. In 1962 he was elected a member of the Supreme Soviet of the Soviet Union.

Keldysh was 67 when he suddenly died on June 24, 1978. He was honoured with a state funeral and his ashes were buried in the Kremlin Wall Necropolis on Red Square.

== Awards and honors ==
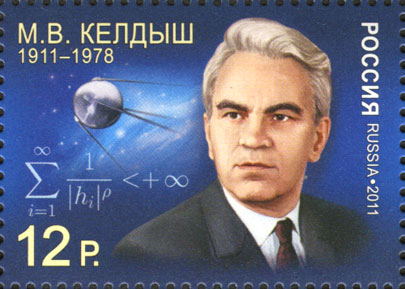
A Russian postal stamp commemorating Keldysh in 2011.

Keldysh was a member of many foreign academies of sciences, including the Mongolian Academy of Sciences (1961), Polish Academy of Sciences (1962), Czechoslovak Academy of Sciences (1962), and Romanian Academy of Sciences (1965). He was also an honorary member of the American Academy of Arts and Sciences (1966), Bulgarian Academy of Sciences (1966), Hungarian Academy of Sciences (1970), and Royal Society of Edinburgh (1968), foreign corresponding member of the German Academy of Sciences (1966), and Saxon Academy of Sciences in Leipzig (1966).

Keldysh was awarded the Stalin Prize (1942, 1946), Lenin Prize (1957), six Orders of Lenin, three other orders, numerous medals and four foreign orders.

The crater Keldysh on the Moon, and the research vessel Akademik Mstislav Keldysh are named after him. A minor planet, 2186 Keldysh discovered in 1973 by Soviet astronomer Lyudmila Chernykh, is named in his honor.

A street (Akadēmiķa Mstislava Keldiša iela) was named after Keldysh in the district of Pļavnieki in his native Riga, Latvia. On 15 December 2022, the street was renamed Brāļu Kaudzīšu Street.

== See also ==
- Keldysh bomber

Academic offices
Preceded by Alexander Nesmeyanov	President of the Academy of Sciences of the USSR; 1961–1975	Succeeded by Anatoly Alexandrov
