= Johann Tobias Bürg =

Austrian astronomer

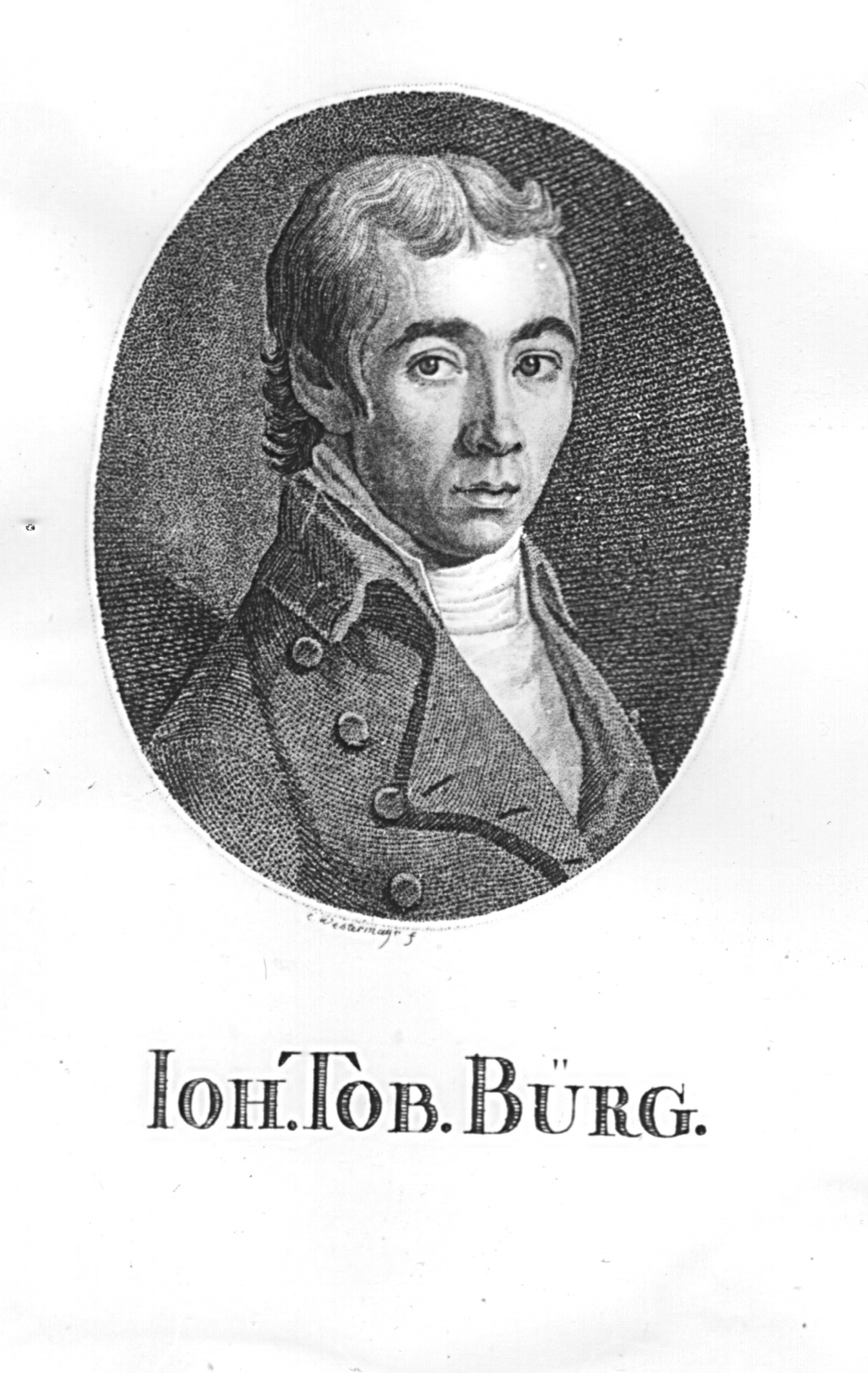
Johann Tobias Bürg.

Johann Tobias Bürg (December 24, 1766 – November 15, 1835), sometimes known as Johannes Burg, was an Austrian astronomer.

== Life ==
Born in Vienna, Bürg worked as astronomical assistant to Franz Xaver von Zach at the Gotha Observatory. From 1791 he served as a professor of physics at the Gymnasium in Klagenfurt, Carinthia. He subsequently became assistant at the Vienna Observatory, where in 1817 he succeeded as director after the death of Franz de Paula Triesnecker.

In 1799 he published astronomical tables on the Orbit of the Moon based on about 3,000 observations, that were praised for their accuracy. For these astronomical tables, Bürg was made a member of the French Academy of Sciences. He also was elected a Foreign Honorary Member of the Russian Academy of Sciences and the Hanoverian Göttingen Academy of Sciences and Humanities in 1801, of the Prussian Academy of Sciences in 1812, as well as of the American Academy of Arts and Sciences in 1822.

He died at Wiesenau Castle, near Sankt Leonhard in Carinthia, where he is also buried. In 1834 the crater Bürg on the Moon was named by Johann Heinrich von Mädler in his honour.

== Notes ==
1. Adolf Drechsler in his Ill. Lexikon der Astronomie (Leipzig, 1881) gives Trier as Bürg's place of birth and 1835 as the year of death. Some sources give November 15 as his date of birth, others November 25, 1834 is sometimes given as his date of death.
