= Grove (crater) =

Crater on the Moon

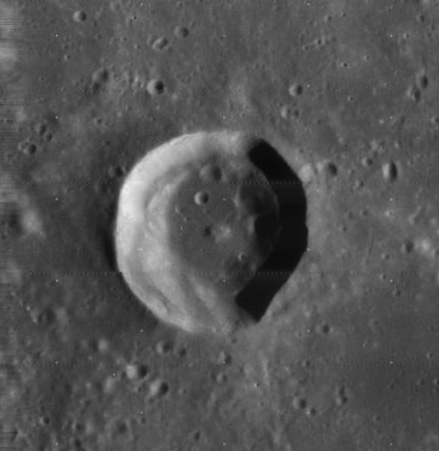
- Lunar Orbiter 4 image
- Coordinates: 40.3°N 32.9°E
- Diameter: 28.55 km
- Depth: 2.37 km
- Colongitude: 328° at sunrise
- Eponym: William R. Grove

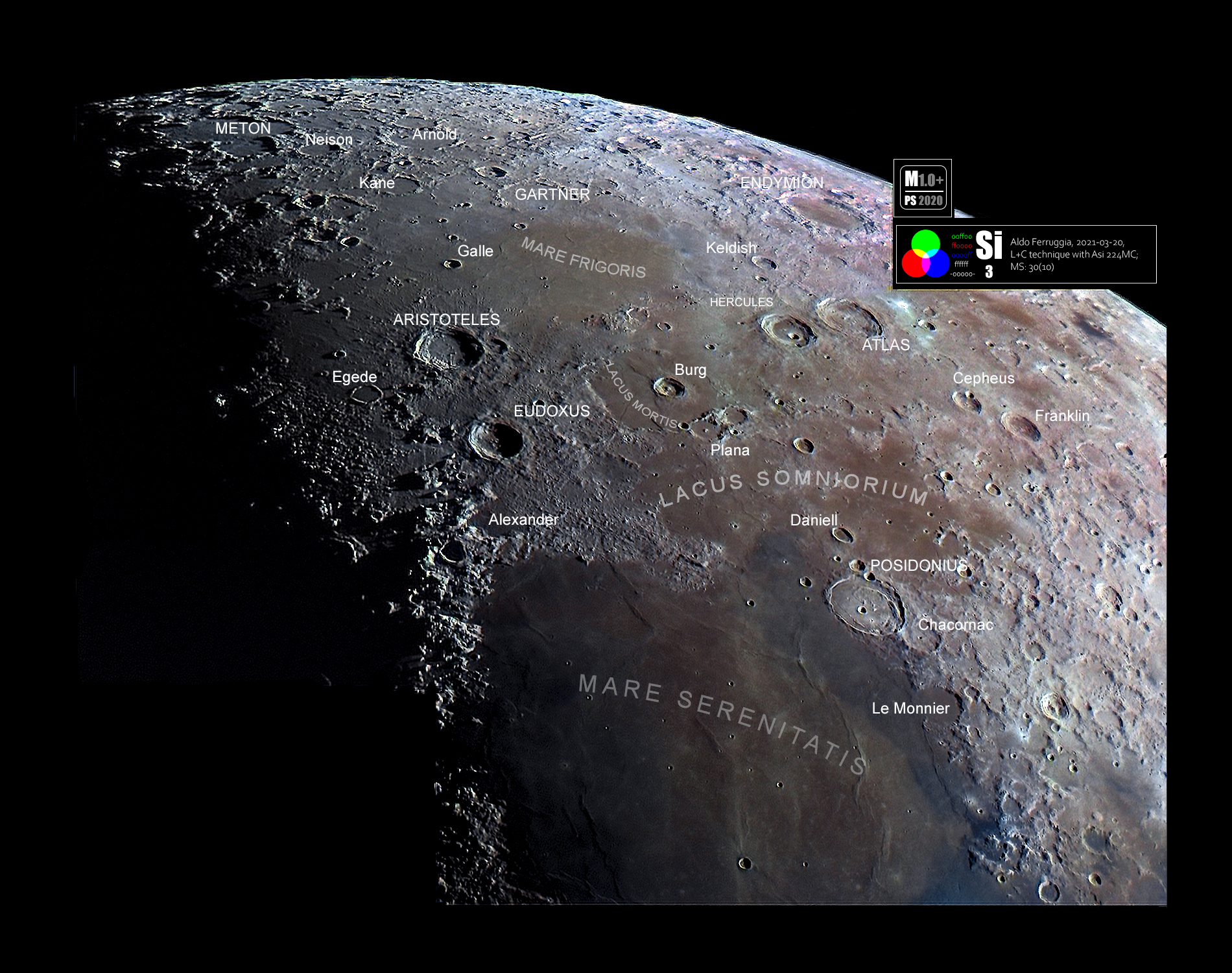
Grove area and closer craters in mineral postprocessing

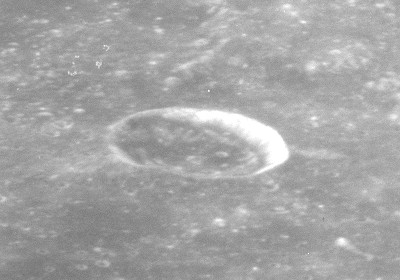
Oblique view from Apollo 16

Grove is a small lunar impact crater that lies in the northern part of the Lacus Somniorum. It is located to the southeast of the crater remnant Mason. Grove is a relatively circular crater formation with a simple, sharp-edged rim. The unconsolidated material along the inner wall has slumped down to the floor, forming a ring around the relatively level base. The floor contains a few tiny impacts, but is otherwise nearly featureless.

This crater is named after Welsh physicist William Robert Grove (1811–1896). The designation was officially adopted by the International Astronomical Union in 1935.

== Satellite craters ==
By convention these features are identified on lunar maps by placing the letter on the side of the crater midpoint that is closest to Grove.

Grove	Latitude	Longitude	Diameter
Y	37.4° N	31.7° E	3 km
