= Plana (crater) =

Crater on the Moon

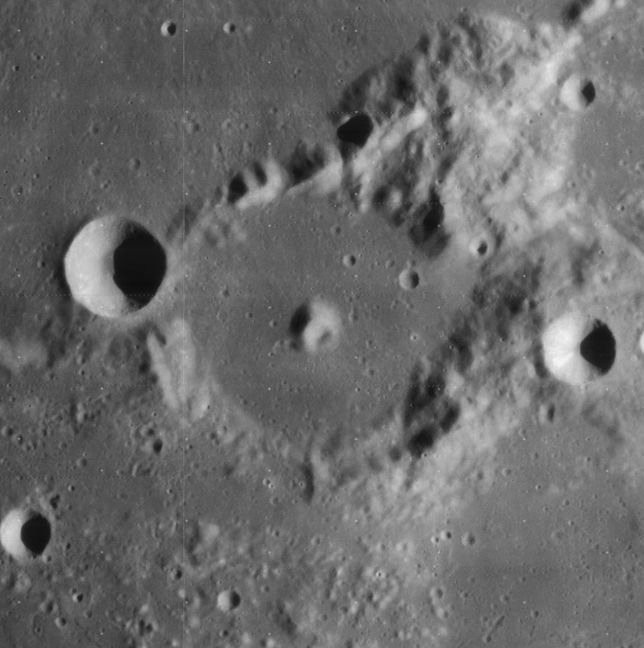
- Lunar Orbiter 4 image
- Coordinates: 42.2°N 28.2°E
- Diameter: 44 km
- Depth: 1.8 km
- Colongitude: 332° at sunrise
- Eponym: Giovanni A. A. Plana

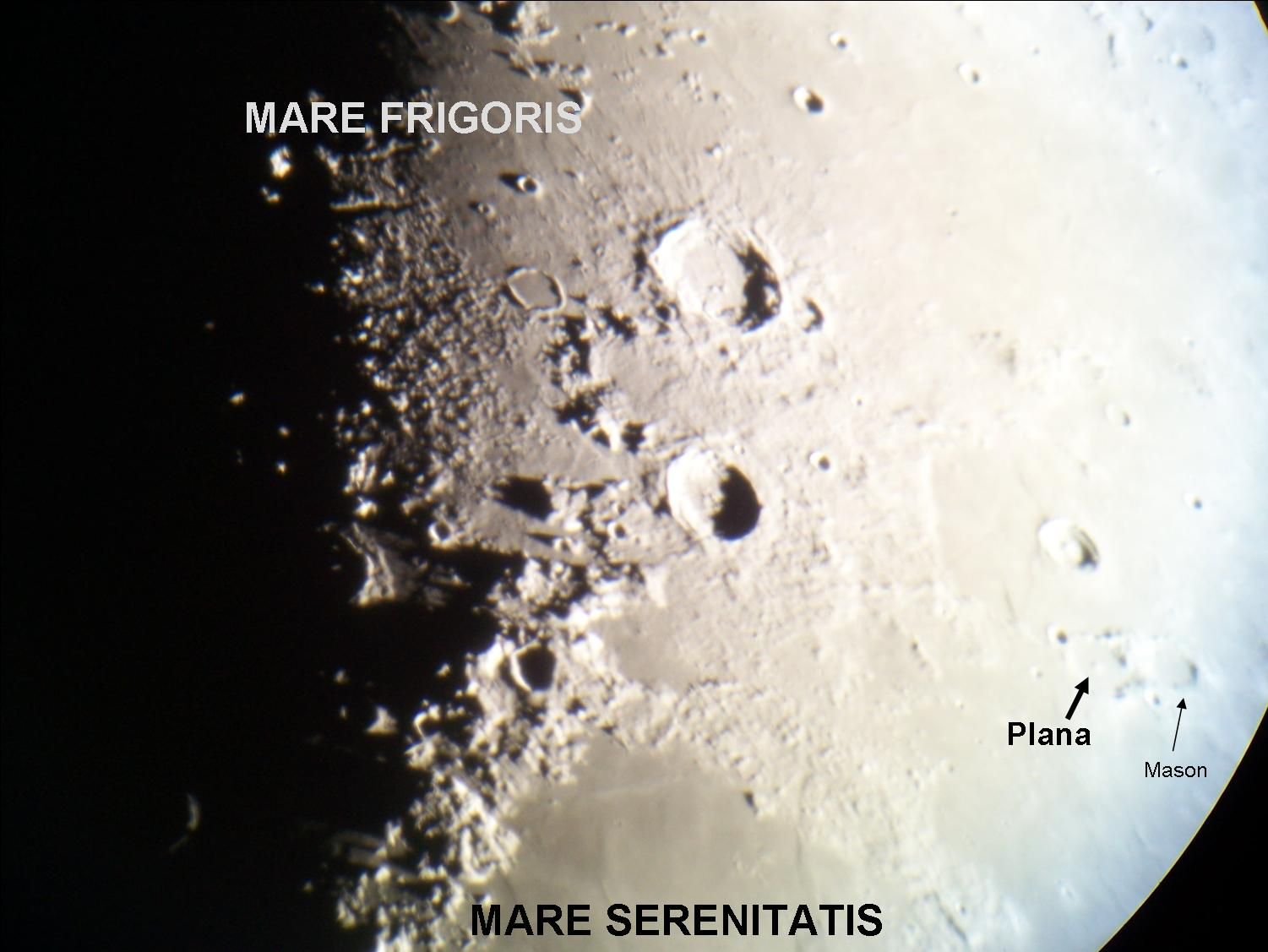
Location of the lunar crater Plana as photographed at the McDonald Observatory

Plana is a lunar impact crater that lies on the boundary between two small lunar mare areas, with Lacus Mortis to the north and the larger Lacus Somniorum on the southern side. It was named after Italian astronomer Giovanni Antonio Amedeo Plana. It is joined to the crater Mason to the east by a short stretch of rugged ground. Due north of Plana in the midst of the Lacus Mortis is the prominent crater Bürg.

This is a crater with a slender outer rim that has been worn and eroded by impacts. This rim surrounds an interior that has been flooded by basaltic lava, leaving a level surface with only a central peak at the midpoint projecting up through the floor. There is a small craterlet near the eastern rim, but otherwise the interior floor is nearly featureless. The outer rim has some narrow breaks along the northwest, and the side is lower along the southwestern face. A small, circular crater intrudes slightly into the northwestern part of the rim.

== Satellite craters ==
By convention these features are identified on lunar maps by placing the letter on the side of the crater midpoint that is closest to Plana.

| Plana | Latitude | Longitude | Diameter |
|---|---|---|---|
| C | 42.7° N | 27.1° E | 14 km |
| D | 41.7° N | 26.2° E | 7 km |
| E | 40.5° N | 23.6° E | 6 km |
| F | 39.8° N | 24.0° E | 5 km |
| G | 39.1° N | 22.9° E | 9 km |

The name Mandela (or Nelson Mandela International Peace Crater) has been proposed for Plana G, in honor of Nelson Mandela, by the Luna Society International, but this has not been approved by the IAU.
