= Mason (crater) =

Crater on the Moon

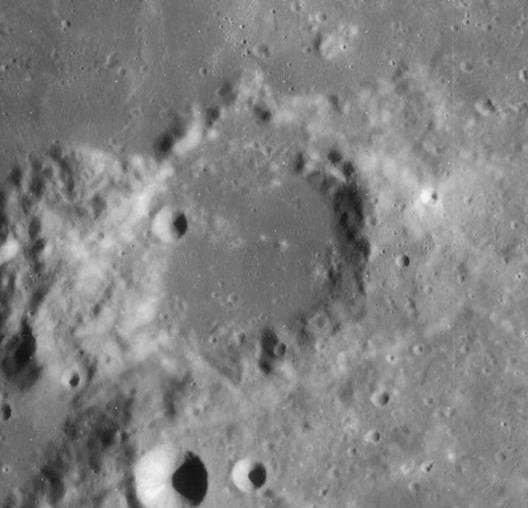
- Lunar Orbiter 4 image
- Coordinates: 42.6°N 30.5°E
- Diameter: 33 × 43 km
- Depth: 1.9 km
- Colongitude: 330° at sunrise
- Eponym: Charles Mason

Mason is the remains of a lunar impact crater that lies in the northeastern part of the Moon. It is nearly attached to the eastern rim of the flooded crater Plana, and southeast of Bürg. Along the northern rim of Mason is the southern edge of the Lacus Mortis, a small lunar mare. To the south is the larger Lacus Somniorum.

== Appearance ==
This is a heavily eroded crater formation that is somewhat irregular in shape, being longer in the east–west direction. The rim is an uneven, disintegrated ring of ridges that have merged with the rough terrain to the south and east. There are clefts or valleys in the western rim that reach the eastern rim of Plana. The interior floor has been resurfaced by lava, and forms a nearly level basin within the rim. The small crater Mason A lies in the northwest part of the floor.

== Name ==
The crater is named after the English-American astronomer Charles Mason.

== Satellite craters ==
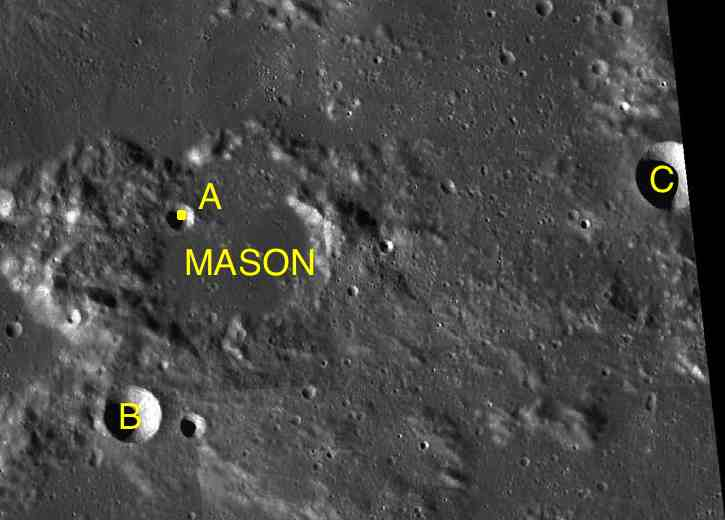
Mason and its satellite craters

By convention these features are identified on lunar maps by placing the letter on the side of the crater midpoint that is closest to Mason.

Mason	Latitude	Longitude	Diameter
A	42.8° N	30.1° E	5 km
B	41.8° N	29.6° E	10 km
C	42.9° N	33.8° E	12 km
