= Keldysh (crater) =

Crater on the Moon

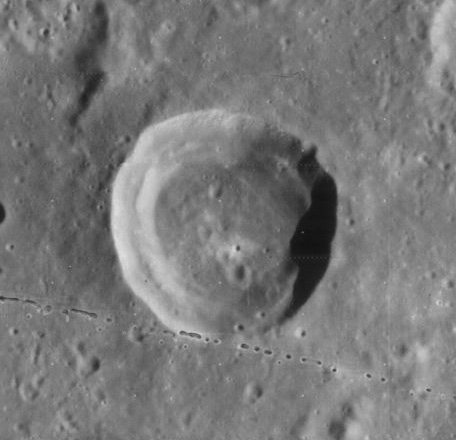
- Lunar Orbiter 4 image
- Coordinates: 51.23°N 43.65°E
- Diameter: 32.75 km
- Depth: Unknown
- Colongitude: 317° at sunrise
- Eponym: Mstislav V. Keldysh

Keldysh is a lunar impact crater that is located in the northeastern part of the Moon, at the eastern rim of the Mare Frigoris. It lies due north of the prominent crater Atlas, and to the northeast of the notable Hercules.

The crater rim is generally circular, although it gives the appearance of a slight eastward bulge. The rim edge is sharp and displays little appearance of wear, with only a tiny craterlet along the eastern edge. The inner wall slopes down without terraces to the ejecta along the base. The interior floor is relatively featureless and is free of notable impacts or ridges.

This crater was previously designated Hercules A, a satellite crater of Hercules, before being renamed by the IAU in 1982.
