= Bürg (crater) =

Crater on the Moon

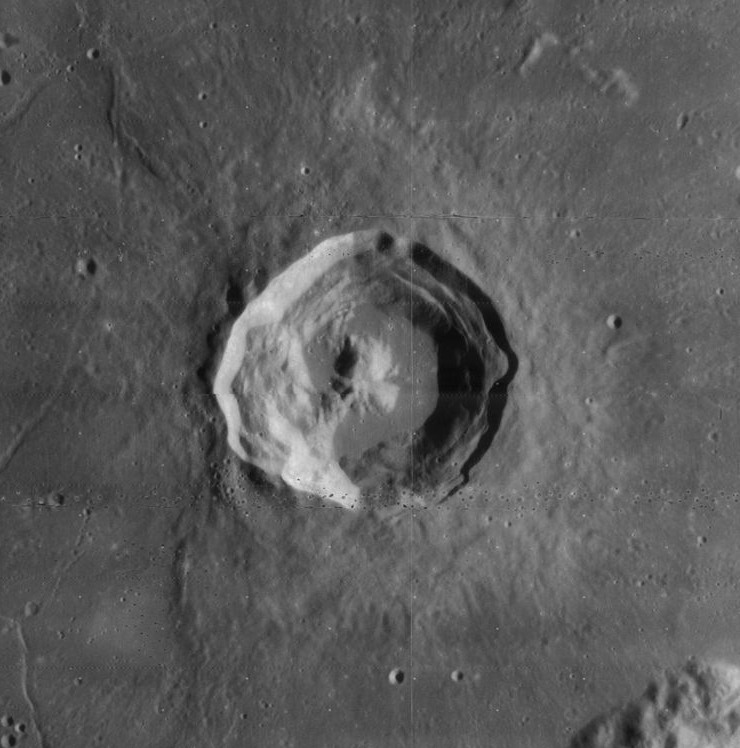
- Lunar Orbiter 4 image
- Coordinates: 45.0°N 28.2°E
- Diameter: 41.04 km
- Depth: 3.07 km
- Colongitude: 332° at sunrise
- Formation: Copernican
- Eponym: Johann T. Bürg

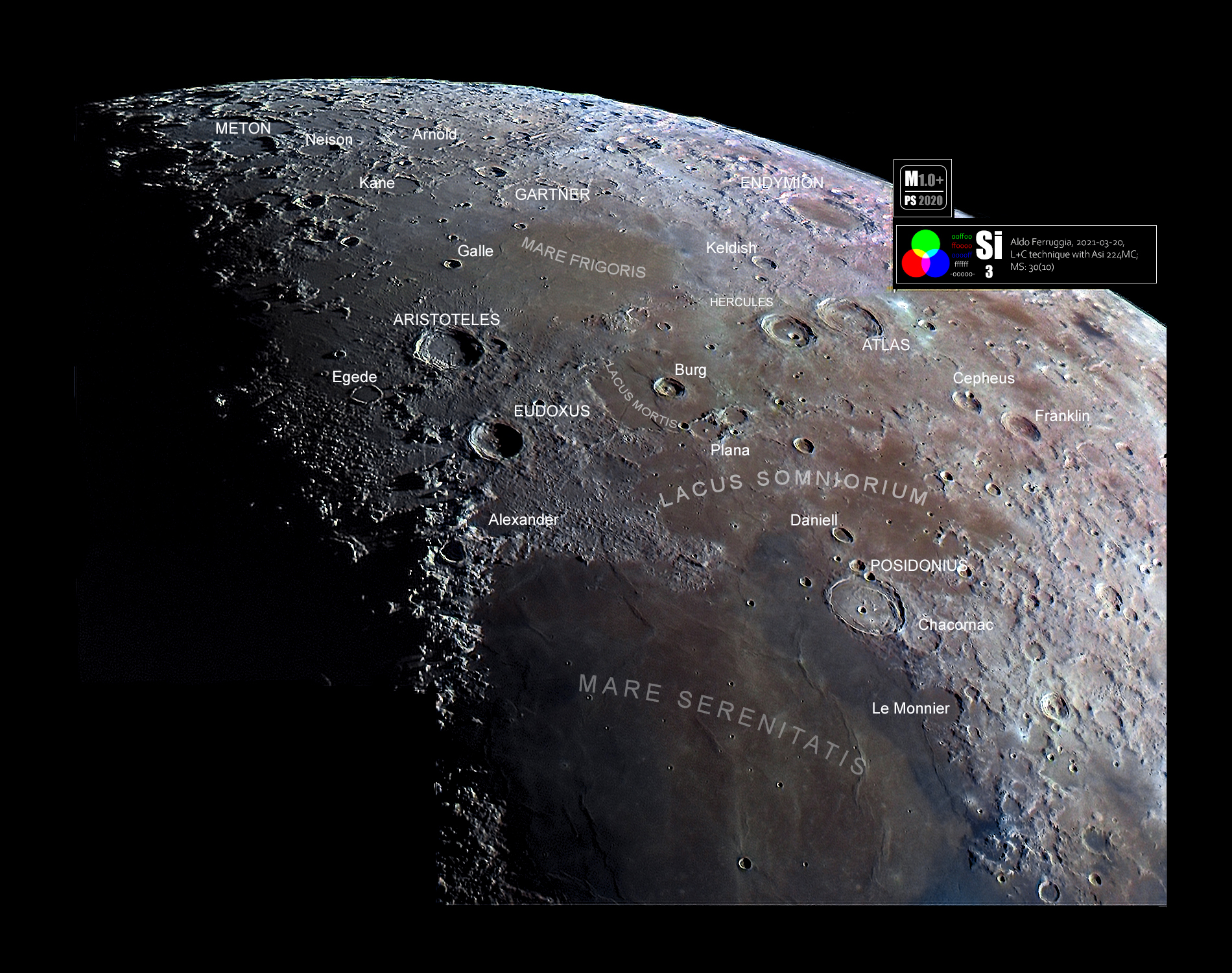
Location of Bürg

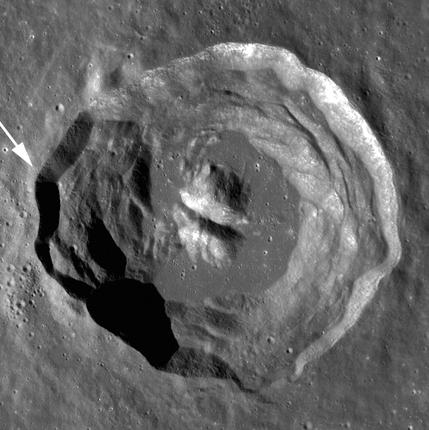
LRO image

Bürg is a prominent lunar impact crater in the northeast part of the Moon. It lies within the lava-flooded, ruined crater formation designated Lacus Mortis. To the south and southeast is the crater pair Plana and Mason. To the west, beyond the rim of Lacus Mortis, is the prominent crater Eudoxus.

The rim of Bürg is nearly circular with relatively little wear. The interior is bowl-shaped, and there is a large central mountain at the midpoint. The spectra of the central peak fits a noritic gabbro mineralogy, which originated from a depth of 3.9 to 5.8 km. Along the crest of this mountain some observers have noted a small, crater-like pit. The crater has a ray system that crosses Mare Serenitatis, and is consequently mapped as part of the Copernican System. It is characterised by an extremely high rockfall density by lunar standards.

To the west is a rille system designated the Rimae Bürg, which spans a distance of about 100 kilometers.

Bürg is named for Austrian astronomer Johann Tobias Bürg, who discovered Antares's companion star during an occultation event in 1819. His name was introduced into lunar nomenclature by J. H. von Mädler in 1837. This designation was officially adopted by the International Astronomical Union in 1935.

== Satellite craters ==
By convention these features are identified on lunar maps by placing the letter on the side of the crater midpoint that is closest to Bürg.

Bürg	Latitude	Longitude	Diameter
A	46.8° N	33.1° E	12 km
B	42.6° N	23.5° E	6 km
