= Lacus Somniorum =

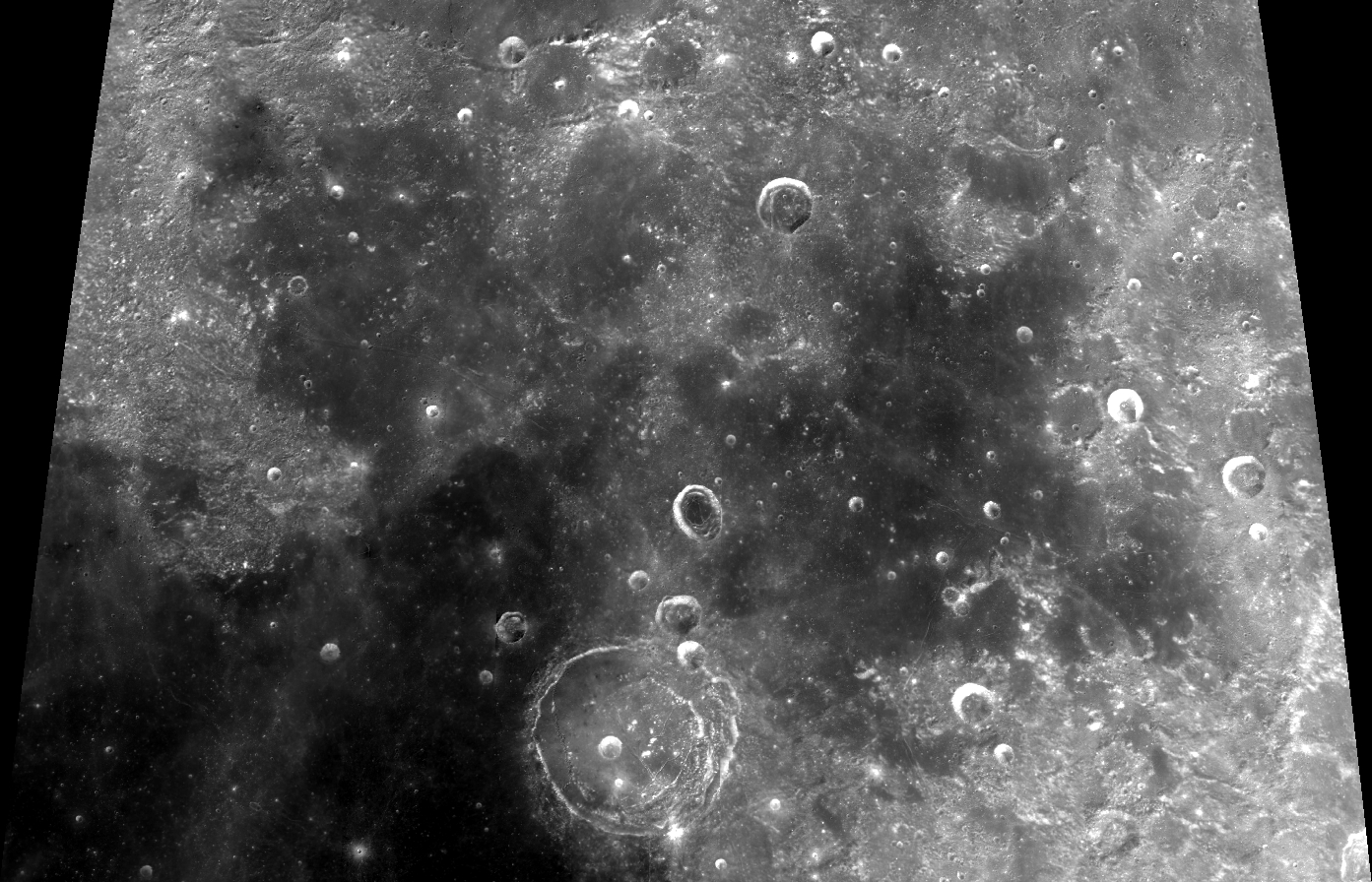
- Coordinates: 37.56°N 30.8°E
- Diameter: 424.76 km
- Eponym: Lake of Dreams

Lacus Somniorum (Latin somniōrum, "Lake of Dreams") is a basaltic plain located in the northeastern part of the Moon's near side. It is located at selenographic coordinates 37.56° N, 30.8° E, and has a diameter of 424.76 kilometers. The name is Latin for Lake of Dreams, a title given to this feature by Giovanni Riccioli. It is the largest of the lunar features designated Lacus.

Lacus Somniorum is an irregular feature with complex, somewhat ill-defined borders. The surface has the same low albedo as the larger lunar mare found on the Moon, and its surface was formed by flows of basaltic lava. The mare material contains what is described as, "unusually bright and red mare soils" of somewhat uncertain composition. It possesses reddish hues and higher than normal albedo. There may be a lower abundance of ferrous materials in these basalts compared to the nearby Mare Serenitatis. The mare material shows a significant amount of contribution from deposited highland material.

To the southwest this plain is joined to the Mare Serenitatis through a wide gap northwest of the crater Posidonius. This crater forms the western end of the southern border, which extends eastward to about longitude 41° before turning northwest. Along this southern border is attached the flooded crater Hall, and a 150-km-long rille named the Rima G. Bond for the small crater G. Bond south of Hall.

The irregular eastern border comes close to the small crater Maury before continuing to the north until it reaches the crater remnant Williams. From there the edge continues to the west. A narrow border region separates the Lacus Somniorum from the smaller Lacus Mortis to the north. A buried crater with a 200 km diameter was detected in this locale by NASA's GRAIL experiment, forming part of the north wall of the mare. This strip of rough terrain includes the flooded impact craters Mason and Plana.

Finally the lake curves back to the south, joining a region of rough terrain along the northern border of the Mare Serenitatis. In the southern half of this border area lies a rille system designated the Rimae Daniell, which consists of a set of graben oriented along a NNW-SSE direction. These were named for the crater Daniell, a small formation north of Posidonius that is encircled by the Lacus Somniorum. To the north of Daniell, near the northern edge of this feature, lies the small crater Grove.

== Gallery ==
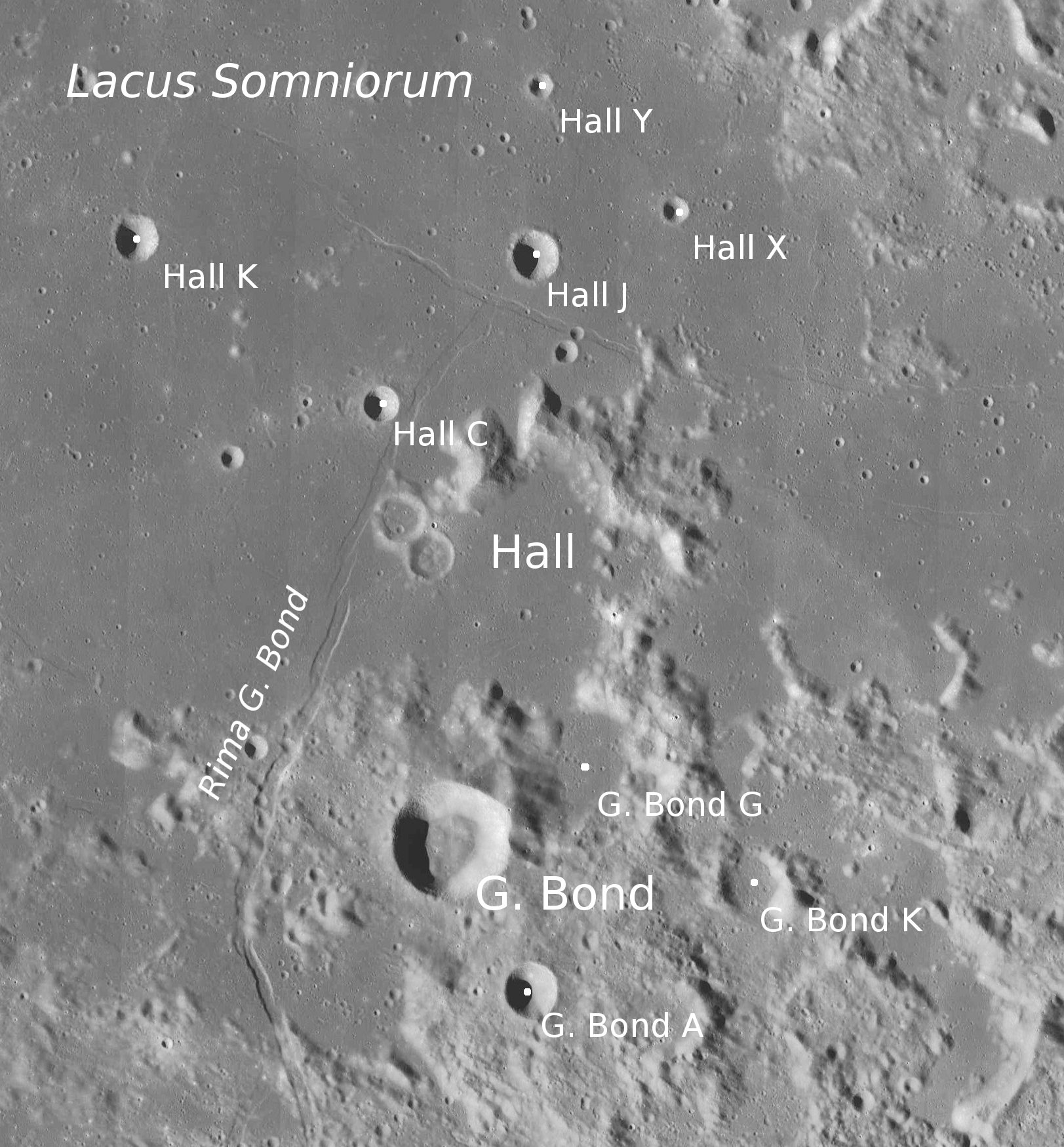
Craters G. Bond and Hall in the eastern mare

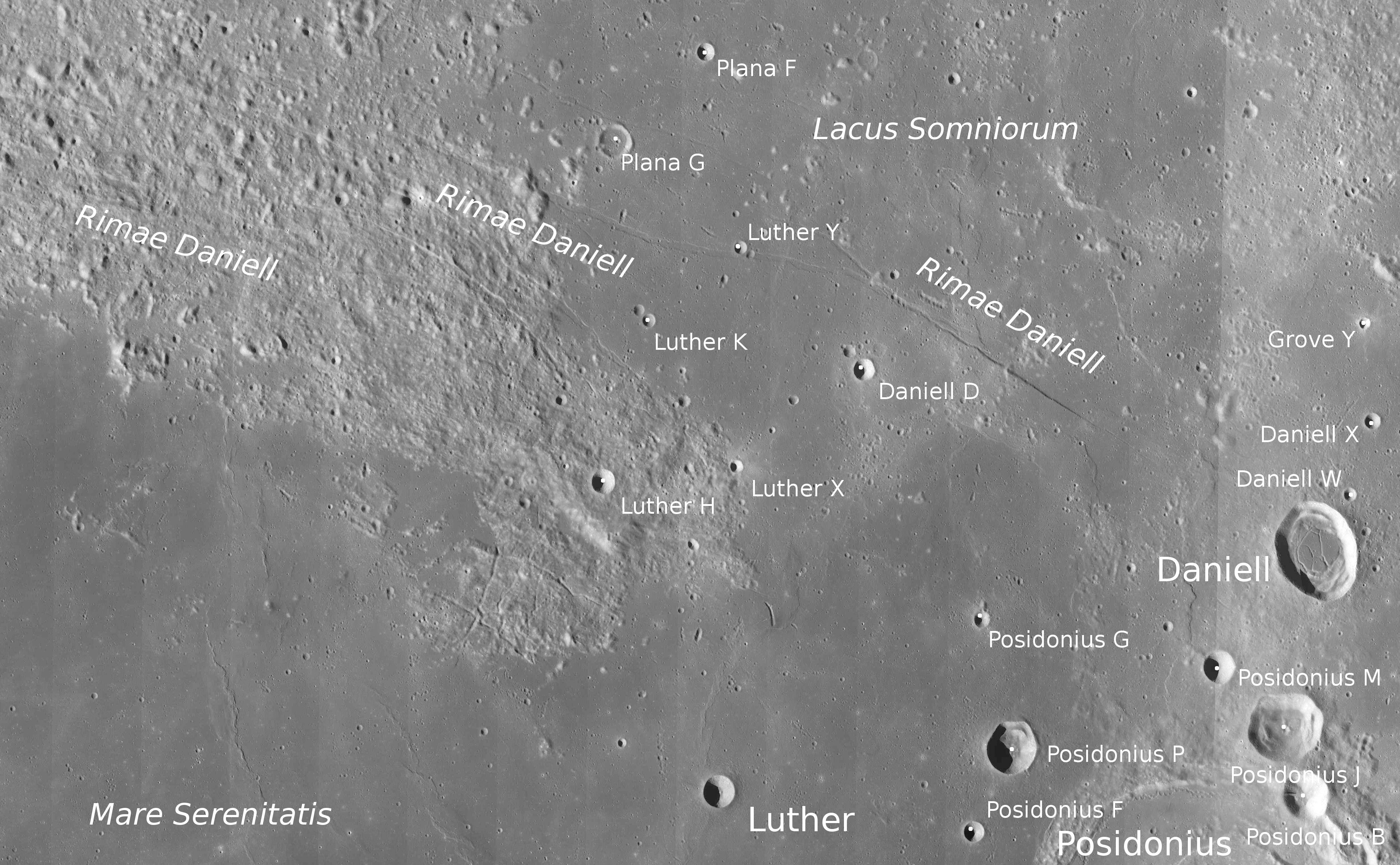
Rimae Daniell in the southern mare

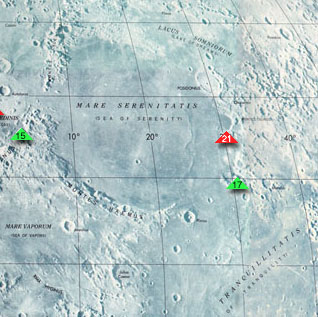
Map of Mare Serenitatis showing the location of Lacus Somniorum in the upper right

== See also ==
- Volcanism on the Moon
