= Aleksei Chernavskii =

Russian mathematician (1938–2023)

Aleksei Viktorovich Chernavskii (or Chernavsky or Černavskii) (Russian: Алексей Викторович Чернавский; 17 January 1938 – 22 December 2023) was a Russian mathematician, specializing in differential geometry and topology.

== Biography ==
Chernavskii was born in Moscow and completed undergraduate study at the Faculty of Mechanics and Mathematics of Moscow State University in 1959. He enrolled in graduate school at the Steklov Institute of Mathematics. In 1964 he defended his Candidate of Sciences (PhD) thesis, written under the guidance of Lyudmila Keldysh, on the topic Конечнократные отображения многообразий (Finite-fold mappings of manifolds). In 1970 he defended his Russian Doctor of Sciences (habilitation) thesis Гомеоморфизмы и топологические вложения многообразий (Homeomorphisms and topological embeddings of manifolds). In 1970 he was an Invited Speaker at the International Congress of Mathematicians in Nice.

Chernavskii worked as a senior researcher at the Steklov Institute until 1973 and from 1973 to 1980 at Yaroslavl State University. From 1980 to 1985 he was a senior researcher at the Moscow Institute of Physics and Technology. From 1985 he was employed the Kharkevich Institute for Information Transmission Problems of the Russian Academy of Sciences. From 1993 he was working part-time as a professor at the Department of Higher Geometry and Topology, Faculty of Mechanics and Mathematics, Moscow State University. He wrote a textbook on differential geometry for advanced students.

Chernavskii died on 22 December 2023, at the age of 85.

== Chernavskii's theorem ==
Chernavskii's theorem (1964): If $M$ and $N$ are n-manifolds and $f$ is a discrete, open, continuous mapping of $M$ into $N$
then the branch set $B$_{$f$} = { x: x is an element of $M$ and $f$ fails to be a local homeomorphism at x} satisfies dimension ($B$_{$f$}) ≤ n – 2.

== Selected publications ==
- Chernavskii, A. V. (1969). "Local contractibility of the group of homeomorphisms of a manifold". Mathematics of the USSR-Sbornik. 8 (3): 287–333. Bibcode:1969SbMat...8..287C. doi:10.1070/SM1969v008n03ABEH001121.
- Chernavskii, A. V. (1969). "Piecewise linear approximations of embeddings of cells and spheres in codimensions higher than two". Mathematics of the USSR-Sbornik. 9 (3): 321–343. Bibcode:1969SbMat...9..321C. doi:10.1070/SM1969v009n03ABEH001287.
- Abdusamatov, R. M.; Adamovich, S. V.; Berkinblit, M. B.; Chernavsky, A. V.; Feldman, A. G. (1988). "Rapid One-Joint Movements: A Qualitative Model and its Experimental Verification". Stance and Motion. pp. 261–270. doi:10.1007/978-1-4899-0821-6_24. ISBN 978-1-4899-0823-0.
- Karpushkin, V. N.; Chernavsky, A. V. (1997). "The reduction of the control of movement for manipulation robots from many degrees of freedom to one degree of freedom". Journal of Mathematical Sciences. 83 (4): 531–533. doi:10.1007/BF02434982. S2CID 121719832.
- Chernavsky, A.V.; Leksine, V.P. (2006). "Unrecognizability of manifolds". Annals of Pure and Applied Logic. 141 (3): 325–335. doi:10.1016/j.apal.2005.12.011.
- Chernavsky, A. V. (2006). "Theorem on the union of two topologically flat cells of codimension 1 in $\mathbb{R}^n$". Abstract and Applied Analysis. 2006: 1–9. Bibcode:2006AbApA2006E..39C. doi:10.1155/AAA/2006/82602.
- Chernavskii, A. V. (2008). "Local contractibility of the homeomorphism group of $\mathbb{R}^n$". Proceedings of the Steklov Institute of Mathematics. 263: 189–203. doi:10.1134/S0081543808040147. S2CID 120374353.
