= Arthur Stanley Williams =

English astronomer (1861–1938)

- Born: 1861; Brighton, England
- Died: 21 November 1938 (aged 76–77)
- Awards: Jackson-Gwilt Medal (1923)
- Scientific career
- Fields: Astronomy
- Institutions: Royal Astronomical Society

Arthur Stanley Williams (1861 in Brighton – 21 November 1938) was an English solicitor and amateur astronomer. He dedicated himself to the telescopic observation of the planets. He also was enthusiastic about yachting, winning the Challenge Cup in 1920.

== Planetary works ==
Using a 6½ inch reflector on an equatorial mount for most of his work, he published an influential paper in 1896: "On the Drift of Surface Material of Jupiter in Different Latitudes." With this work he greatly strengthened the efforts to systematically observe Jupiter. He also invented the naming of belts and zones in 1898. He championed the method of determining the longitude of surface features using their central meridian transit.

In 1899 he published his most influential paper: "Periodic Variations in the Colours of the two Equatorial Belts of Jupiter."

He also observed spots on Saturn, and the "linear features" on Mars, called "canals". He agreed early on with E. M. Antoniadi that these were largely illusory.

== Awards ==
He was made a fellow of the Royal Astronomical Society in 1884, and was awarded the Jackson-Gwilt Medal in 1923.

The crater Williams on the Moon and a crater on Mars are named in his honor.
