= Pyotr Novikov =

Soviet mathematician (1901–1975)

- Пётр Но́виков
- Novikov
- Born: 15 August 1901; Moscow, Russian Empire
- Died: 9 January 1975 (aged 73); Moscow, Soviet Union
- Education: Moscow University
- Known for: Novikov–Boone theorem
- Spouse: Lyudmila Keldysh
- Children: Sergei Novikov
- Awards: Lenin Prize(1957)
- Scientific career
- Fields: Mathematics
- Workplaces: Steklov Institute of Mathematics; Moscow State Teachers Training Institute; Moscow D. Mendeleev Institute of Chemical Technology
- Doctoral students: Sergei Adian; Albert Muchnik

Pyotr Sergeyevich Novikov (Note: His name was also romanized as Petr Sergeevich Novikov.) (Russian: Пётр Серге́евич Но́виков; 15 August 1901, Moscow – 9 January 1975, Moscow) was a Soviet mathematician known for his work in group theory. His son, Sergei Novikov, was also a mathematician.

== Early life and education ==
Pyotr Sergeyevich Novikov was born on 15 August 1901 in Moscow, Russia to Sergei Novikov, a merchant, and Alexandra Novikov.

He served in the Red Army during the Russian Civil War from 1920 to July 1922. He studied at Moscow University from 1919 to 1920 and again from 1922 until he graduated in 1925. He studied under Nikolai Luzin until he finished his graduate studies in 1929.

== Career ==
Novikov worked at the Moscow D. Mendeleev Institute of Chemical Technology from 1929 until 1934, when he joined the Department of Real Function Theory at the Steklov Institute of Mathematics. He was awarded his doctorate in 1935 and promoted to full professor in 1939. Novikov became head of the Department of Analysis at the Moscow State Teachers Training Institute in 1944. In 1957, he became the first head of the Department of Mathematical Logic at the Steklov Institute. He jointly held both positions until he retired in 1972 and 1973 respectively.

Sergei Adian and Albert Muchnik were among his students.

== Research ==
Novikov is known for his work on combinatorial problems in group theory: the word problem for groups, and his progress in the Burnside problem. In 1955, he proved the Novikov–Boone theorem: that there is a finite presentation of a group ⟨S | R⟩ for which there is no algorithm which, given two words u, v, decides whether u and v describe the same element in the group.

== Awards and honors ==
Novikov was elected a corresponding member and then a full member of the Academy of Sciences of the Soviet Union in 1953 and 1960, respectively.

He was awarded the Lenin Prize in 1957 for proving the undecidability of the word problem in groups.

He received the Order of Lenin in 1961 and again in 1971. He was awarded the Order of the Red Banner of Labour. The State Prize of the Russian Federation was awarded to Novikov posthumously in 1999.

== Personal life ==
He was married to mathematician Lyudmila Keldysh (1904–1976). Their son Sergei Novikov (1938–2024) became the first Soviet mathematician to receive the Fields Medal.

He died on 9 January 1975 in Moscow.

== See also ==
- List of second-generation Mathematicians
