= Victor Buchstaber =

Soviet and Russian mathematician

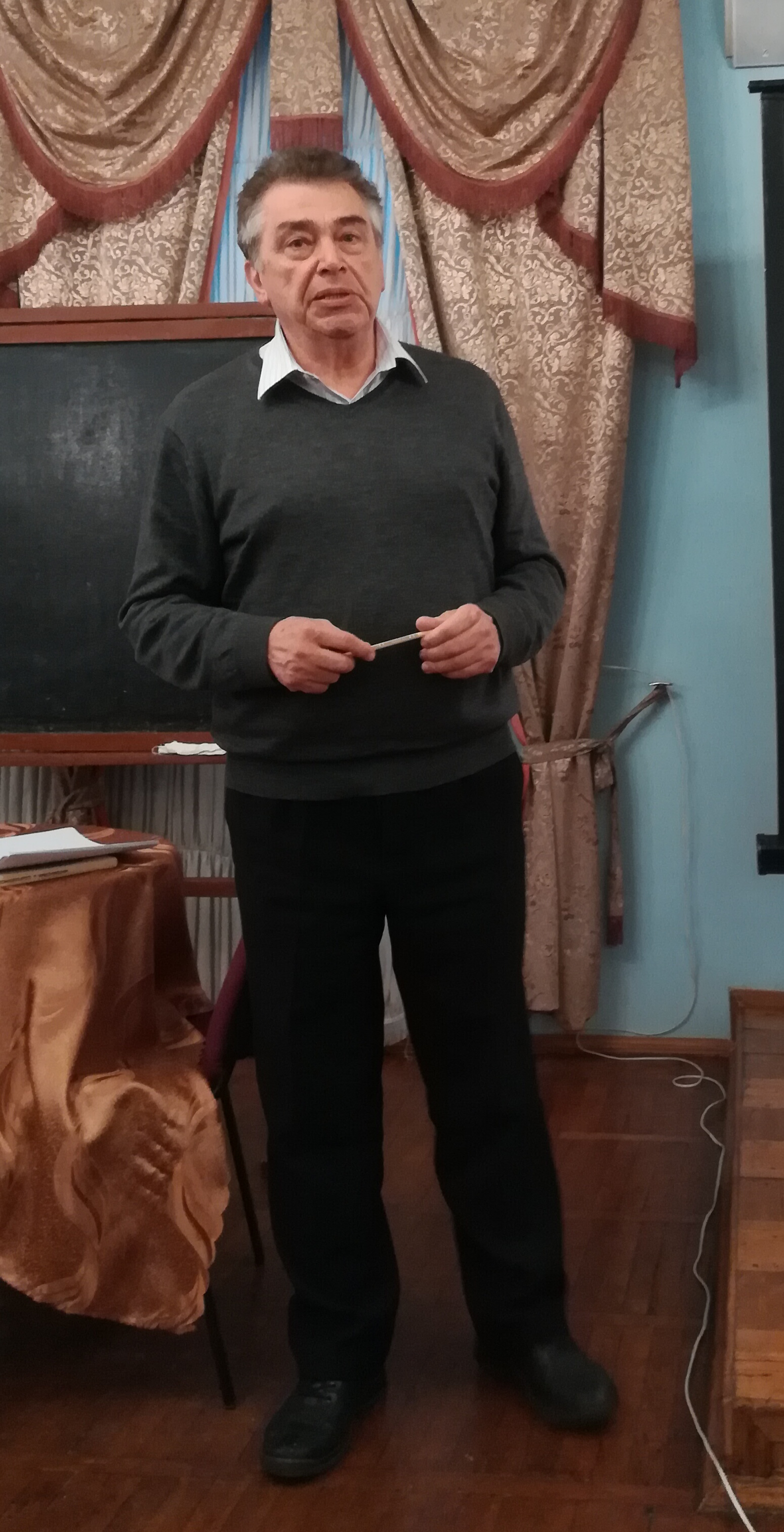
Victor Matveevich Buchstaber

Victor Matveevich Buchstaber (Russian: Виктор Матвеевич Бухштабер, born 1 April 1943, Tashkent, Soviet Union) is a Soviet and Russian mathematician known for his work on algebraic topology, homotopy theory, and mathematical physics.

== Work ==
Buchstaber's first research work was in cobordism theory. He calculated the differential in the Atiyah-Hirzebruch spectral sequence in K-theory and complex cobordism theory, constructed Chern-Dold characters and the universal Todd genus in cobordism, and gave an alternative effective solution of the Milnor-Hirzebruch problem. He went on to develop a theory of double-valued formal groups that led to the calculation of cobordism rings of complex manifolds having symplectic coverings and to the explicit construction of what are now known as Buchstaber manifolds. He devised filtrations in Hopf algebras and the Buchstaber spectral sequence, which were successfully applied to the calculation of stable homotopy groups of spheres.

He worked on the deformation theory for mappings to groups, which led to the solution of the Novikov problem on multiplicative subgroups in operator doubles, and to construction of the quantum group of complex cobordisms. He went on to treat problems related both with algebraic geometry and integrable systems. He is also well known for his work on sigma-functions on universal spaces of Jacobian varieties of algebraic curves that give effective solutions of important integrable systems. Buchstaber created an algebro-functional theory of symmetric products of spaces and described algebraic varieties of polysymmetric polynomials.

== Academic career ==
Buchstaber gained his Ph.D. in 1970 under Sergei Novikov and Dr. Sci. in 1984 from Moscow State University. He is currently a professor at the Faculty of Mathematics and Mechanics, Moscow State University, and an emeritus professor at the School of Mathematics, University of Manchester. He has supervised more than 30 Ph.D. students, including Serge Ochanine, Iosif Polterovich, Taras Panov and Alexander Gaifullin.

In 1974 Buchstaber was an Invited Speaker at the International Congress of Mathematicians in Vancouver (but he did not give a lecture there). In 2004 was elected a corresponding fellow of the Royal Society of Edinburgh. In 2006 he was elected a corresponding member of the Russian Academy of Sciences.

== Works ==
- V. M. Buchstaber; Sergeĭ Petrovich Novikov, eds. (1997). Solitons, Geometry, and Topology: On the Crossroad. American Mathematical Soc. ISBN 978-0-8218-0666-1.
- Victor Buchstaber and Taras Panov, Toric Topology, American Mathematical Society, Providence, RI, 2015.
