= 31st =

31st is the ordinal form of the number 31. 31st or Thirty-first may also refer to:

- A fraction, 1/31, equal to one of 31 equal parts
- 31st of the month, a recurring calendar date

== Geography ==
- 31st meridian east, a line of longitude
- 31st meridian west, a line of longitude
- 31st parallel north, a circle of latitude
- 31st parallel south, a circle of latitude
- 31st Street (disambiguation)

== Military ==
- 31st Army (disambiguation)
- 31st Battalion (disambiguation)
- 31st Brigade (disambiguation)
- 31st Division (disambiguation)
- 31st Regiment (disambiguation)
- 31st Squadron (disambiguation)

== Other ==
- 31st Amendment
- 31st century
- 31st century BC

== See also ==
- 31 (disambiguation)
- The Thirty-First of February, 1949, American fantasy story collection
