= XXXI Corps =

31st Corps, Thirty-first Corps, or XXXI Corps may refer to:

== Russia and Soviet Union ==
- 31st Army Corps (Russian Empire)
- 31st Army Corps (Soviet Union)

== United Kingdom ==
- 31st (Hyde) Cheshire Rifle Volunteer Corps
- 31st (Central Blythswood) Lanarkshire Rifle Volunteer Corps
- 31st (Smethwick) Staffordshire Rifle Volunteer Corps

== Other countries ==
- 31st Army Corps (France)
- XXXI Army Corps (Wehrmacht), Germany
- XXXI Army Corps (Italy)
- XXXI Corps (Pakistan)

== See also ==
- List of military corps by number
- 31st Army (disambiguation)
- 31st Battalion (disambiguation)
- 31st Brigade (disambiguation)
- 31st Division (disambiguation)
- 31st Regiment (disambiguation)
- 31st Squadron (disambiguation)
- 31st (disambiguation)
