= 31st Cavalry =

31st Cavalry, 31st Cavalry Division or 31st Cavalry Regiment may refer to:

== Divisions ==
- 31st Cavalry Division (Soviet Union)

== Regiments ==
- 31st Cavalry Regiment (United States)
- 31st Duke of Connaught's Own Lancers, British India
- 31st Texas Cavalry Regiment, Confederate States Army

== See also ==
- 31st Division (disambiguation)
- 31st Brigade (disambiguation)
- 31st Regiment (disambiguation)
- 31st (disambiguation)

                                                                                                                                           -->
