= 31st Army =

31st Army may refer to:

- 31st Group Army, China
- Thirty-First Army (Japan), Imperial Japanese Army
- 31st Army (Soviet Union)
- 31st Rocket Army, Soviet Union/Russia

== See also ==
- List of armies by number
- XXXI Corps (disambiguation)
- 31st Division (disambiguation)
- 31st Brigade (disambiguation)
- 31st Regiment (disambiguation)
- 31st Battalion (disambiguation)
- 31st Squadron (disambiguation)
- 31st (disambiguation)
