= List of geological features on Hyperion =

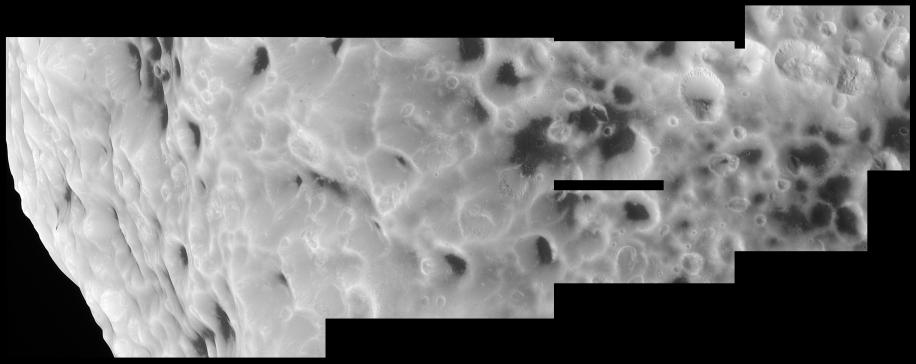
Surface of Hyperion with several craters full of a mysterious reddish gunk. The material contains long chains of carbon and hydrogen and appears very similar to material found on other Saturnian satellites, most notably Iapetus.

This is a list of named geological features on Hyperion, a moon of Saturn.

== Craters ==
This is a list of craters on Hyperion. Hyperionian craters are named after sun and moon gods in various mythologies.

Crater	Coordinates	Diameter (km)	Approval Year	Eponym	Ref
Bahloo	36°N 164°E	n.a.	1982	Bahloo. The Moon; maker of girl babies (Aboriginal mythology)	WGPSN
Helios	71°N 132°W	n.a.	1982	Helios. Greek sun god; son of Hyperion (Greek mythology)	WGPSN
Jarilo	61°N 177°E	n.a.	1982	Jarilo, East Slavic god of the sun fertility and love (Slavic mythology)	WGPSN
Meri	3°N 171°W	n.a.	1982	Meri, folk hero; the Sun (Bororó people)	WGPSN

== Dorsa ==
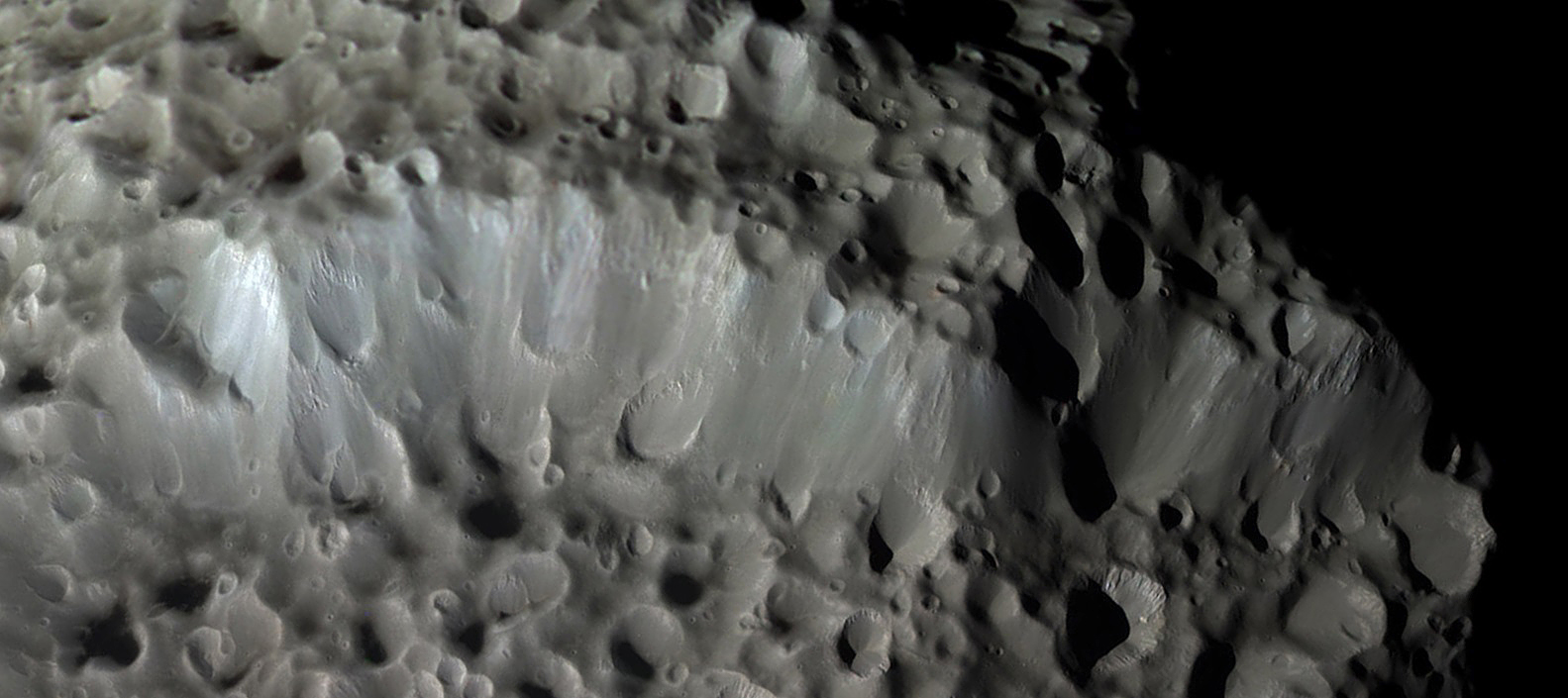
Bond-Lassell Dorsum on Hyperion (Cassini 2007)

There is one named dorsum (ridge) on Hyperion.

Dorsum	Coordinates	Diameter (km)	Approval Date	Named After	Refs
Bond-Lassell Dorsum	48°N 143.5°W	0	1982	George Phillips Bond, William Cranch Bond and William Lassell	WGPSN
