= Themis (hypothetical moon) =

Hypothetical moon of Saturn

On April 28, 1905, William H. Pickering, who had discovered the Saturnian moon Phoebe seven years earlier, announced the discovery of a tenth Saturnian satellite, which he promptly named Themis after the Greek goddess of divine law and order. The thirteen photographic plates on which it supposedly appeared spanned a period between April 17 and July 8, 1904. No other astronomer ever confirmed Pickering's claim.

Pickering attempted to compute an orbit, which showed a fairly high inclination (39.1° to the ecliptic), fairly large eccentricity (0.23) and a semi-major axis (1,457,000 kilometres (905,000 mi)) slightly less than that of Hyperion. The period was supposedly 20.85 days, with prograde motion.

Pickering estimated Themis's diameter at 38 miles (61 km), based on his assumptions that Themis's albedo was the same as Titan's, and that Titan's diameter was about 2300 miles. (3701.4912 km) Today, Titan's diameter is known to be closer to 3200 miles. (5149.9 km) The same assumptions led him to a diameter of 42 miles (68 km) for Phoebe, far less than Phoebe's true diameter of roughly 132 miles (213 km).

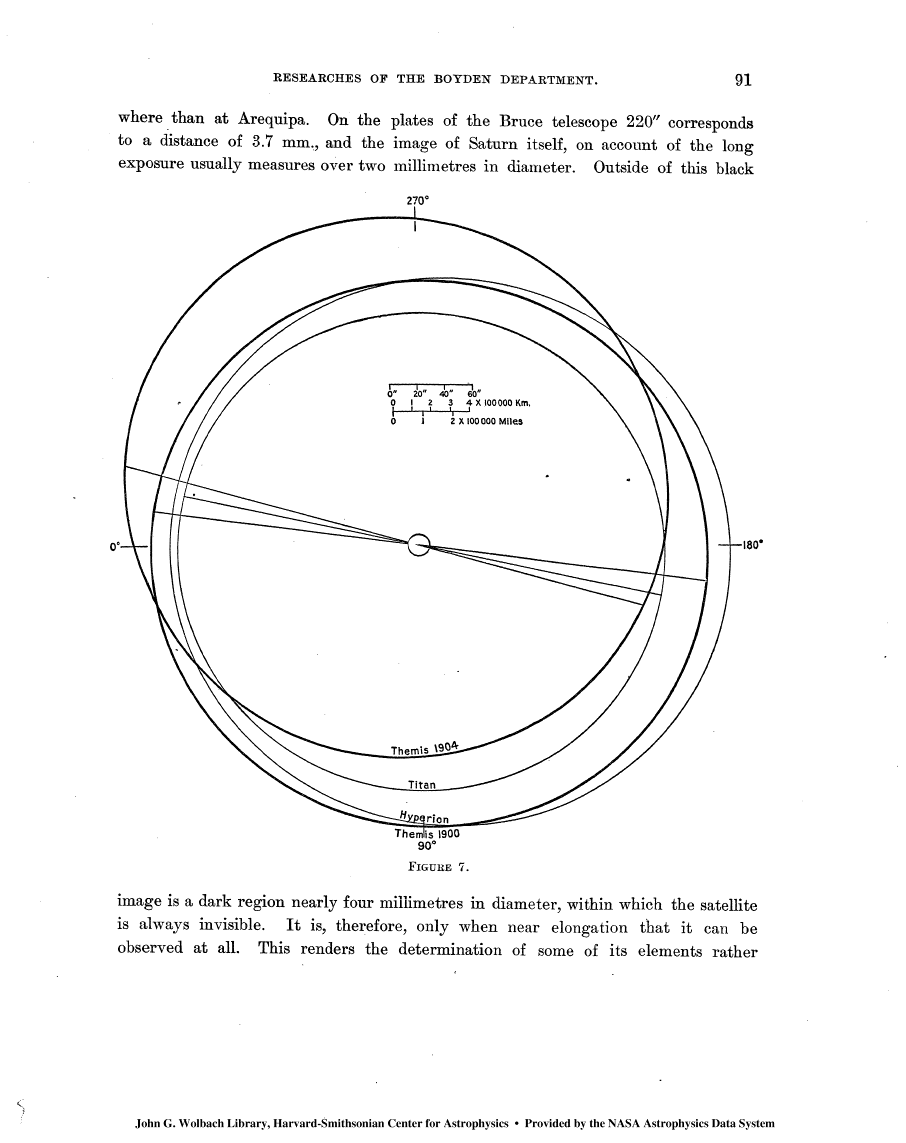
Two possible orbits for Themis, as calculated by W. H. Pickering.

In April 1861, Hermann Goldschmidt had also believed that he had discovered a new satellite of Saturn between Titan and Hyperion, which he called Chiron. It does not exist, though the name was used much later for the large comet and centaur 2060 Chiron.

Pickering was awarded the Lalande Prize of the French Academy of Sciences in 1906 for his "discovery of the ninth and tenth satellites of Saturn".

The actual tenth satellite of Saturn (in order of discovery) was Janus, which was discovered in 1966 and confirmed in 1980.

== In fiction ==
Philip Latham (pen-name of Robert S. Richardson), in his 1953 novel Missing Men of Saturn, has Themis collide with Titan, "getting rid of the little nuisance once and for all", according to the introduction.

John Varley's 1979 science fiction novel Titan is set aboard an expedition to Saturn. During the novel, as they approach the planet and prepare to enter orbit, the astronomer onboard discovers a new moon. At first she believes she has recovered Pickering's lost moon, so she names it Themis.

Robert Anton Wilson's 1979-1981 Schrödinger's Cat trilogy of novels makes frequent reference to Pickering's Moon as a satellite that revolves the "wrong way" (i. e. retrograde) around its primary. Likewise, the Principia Discordia asks in the novel: "Why does Pickering's Moon go about in reverse orbit?"

Nelson S. Bond, in his 1943 science-fiction story "The Ordeal of Lancelot Biggs," explains that Themis periodically disappears when it is occulted by its own moon, an invisible body with "the peculiar property of being able to warp light waves around itself".

In Gemini Home Entertainment it appears in the episode CRUSADER PROBE MISSION as a body in the 'first cluster'.

== See also ==
- List of hypothetical astronomical objects
