= Other Worlds Than Ours =

2005 collection of short stories by Nelson Bond

Other Worlds than Ours
- Dust-jacket illustration by Alan Fore for Other Worlds than Ours
- Author: Nelson Bond
- Cover artist: Alan Fore, design by JenGraph (Jennifer A. Niles)
- Language: English
- Genre: Science fiction
- Publisher: Arkham House
- Publication date: 2005
- Publication place: United States
- Media type: Print (hardback)
- Pages: 580 pp
- ISBN: 0-87054-184-6
- OCLC: 62035108

Other Worlds Than Ours is a collection of science fiction short stories by Nelson Bond. It was released in 2005 by Arkham House in an edition of approximately 2,000 copies. It was the author's third book published by Arkham House following Nightmares and Daydreams (1968) and The Far Side of Nowhere (2002). The stories originally appeared in the magazines Astounding, Thrilling Wonder Stories, Planet Stories and Blue Book.

== Contents ==
Other Worlds Than Ours contains the following tales:

1. "The Fifth Dimension"
  - "Legacy"
  - "Luxury Liner"
  - "Phantom Out of Time"
  - "Revolt on Io"
  - "Jessifer Rides Again"
2. "Siblings of the Sun"
  - "Shadrach"
  - "Martian Caravan"
  - "Wanderers of the Wolf Moon"
3. "The Squared Circle"
  - "Gods of the Jungle"
4. "Order Out of Chaos"
  - "Colossus of Chaos"
  - "Pawns of Chaos"
  - "Captain Chaos"
5. "Postscript to the Future"
  - "The Ultimate Salient"
