= NGC 391 =

Galaxy in the constellation Cetus

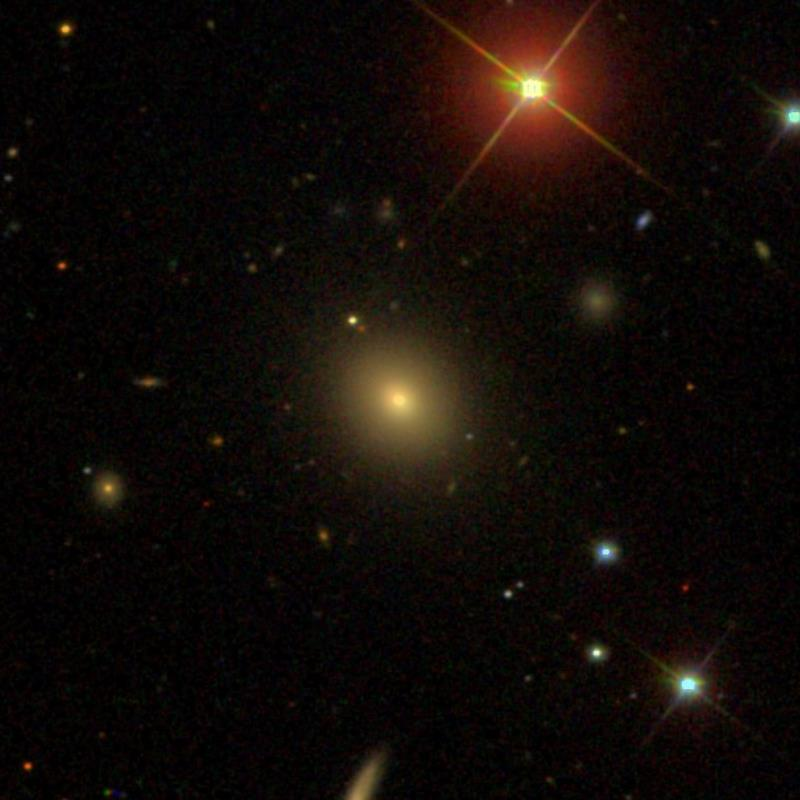
- SDSS image of NGC 391

Observation data (J2000 epoch)
- Constellation: Cetus
- Right ascension: 01^{h} 07^{m} 22.5865^{s}
- Declination: +00° 55′ 33.403″
- Redshift: 0.017829±0.00000667
- Heliocentric radial velocity: 5,345±2 km/s
- Distance: 241.6 ± 17.0 Mly (74.07 ± 5.20 Mpc)
- Apparent magnitude (V): 14.1g

Characteristics
- Type: (R')SA0^{−}:
- Size: ~94,800 ly (29.08 kpc) (estimated)
- Apparent size (V): 0.89′ × 0.75′

Other designations
- 2MASX J01072255+0055331, UGC 693, MCG +00-03-075, PGC 3976, CGCG 384-077

NGC 391 is an unbarred lenticular galaxy located in the constellation Cetus. Its velocity with respect to the cosmic microwave background is 5,022±23 km/s, which corresponds to a Hubble distance of 241.6 ± 17.0 Mly (74.07 ± 5.20 Mpc). Additionally, one non-redshift measurement gives a farther distance of 272 Mly (83.3 Mpc). It was discovered by American astronomer George Bond on January 8, 1853. It was described by Dreyer as "faint, small, mottled but not resolved (Auwers 9)."

== Supernova ==
One supernova has been observed in NGC 391: SN 2025rat (Type Ia, mag. 19.9454) was discovered by Zwicky Transient Facility on 11 July 2025.

== See also ==
- List of NGC objects (1–1000)
