= Timaeus =

Timaeus (or Timaios) is a Greek name. It may refer to:

- Timaeus (dialogue), a Socratic dialogue by Plato
- Timaeus of Locri, 5th-century BC Pythagorean philosopher, appearing in Plato's dialogue
- Timaeus (historian) (c. 345 BC-c. 250 BC), Greek historian from Tauromenium in Sicily
- Timaeus the Sophist, Greek philosopher who lived sometime between the 1st and 4th centuries, supposed writer of a lexicon of Platonic words
- Timaeus, mentioned in Mark 10:46 as the father of Bartimaeus
- Timaeus (crater), a lunar crater named after the philosopher
- Timaeus, one of the Three Legendary Dragons from the Japanese anime series Yu-Gi-Oh!
- Timaios or Tutimaios, a pharaoh of Egypt mentioned by Josephus in his Contra Apionem, sometimes identified with Dedumose II
- timaeusTestified, the screen name of the fictional character Dirk Strider in the webcomic Homestuck
