= NGC 219 =

Elliptical galaxy in the constellation Cetus

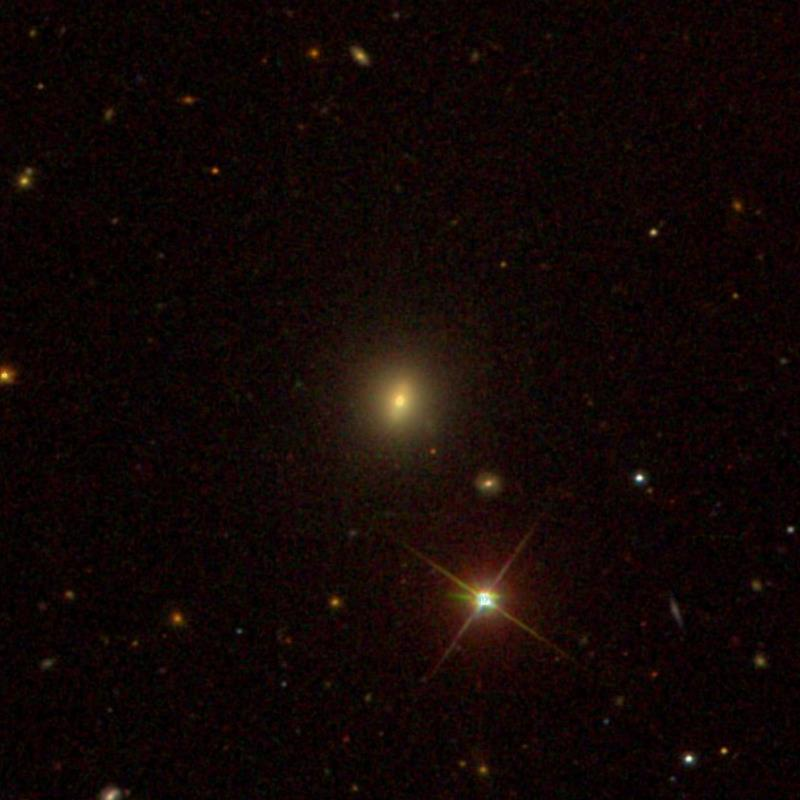
- SDSS view of NGC 219

Observation data (J2000 epoch)
- Constellation: Cetus
- Right ascension: 00^{h} 42^{m} 11.3^{s}
- Declination: +00° 54′ 16″
- Redshift: 0.018252
- Distance: 245 Mly
- Apparent magnitude (V): 15.0g

Characteristics
- Type: cE
- Apparent size (V): 0.62' × 0.59'

Other designations
- CGCG 383-073, MCG +00-02-128, 2MASX J00421129+0054161, PGC 2522.

NGC 219 is a compact elliptical galaxy located approximately 245 million light-years from the Sun in the constellation Cetus. It was discovered on September 16, 1863 by George Bond.

== See also ==
- List of NGC objects (1–1000)
