= Bondia =

Bondia may refer to:

- Bondia (moth), a genus of moth
- Bondia (newspaper), a newspaper in Andorra and in Lleida, Spain
- 767 Bondia, a minor planet of the Sun
- Bondia, an album by Catalan group Els Pets
