= Gemini Home Entertainment =

Analog horror series by Remy Abode

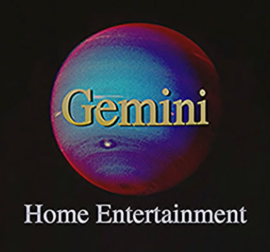
- Series logo, depicting the planet Neptune
- Genre: Found footage; Analog horror; Body horror; Cosmic horror; Psychological horror; Science fiction horror; Surrealism; Anthology
- Created by: Remy Abode
- Written by: Remy Abode
- Directed by: Remy Abode
- Country of origin: Canada
- Original language: English
- No. of episodes: 15 (Main episodes); 4 (Library); 1 (Deleted)

Production
- Animators: Remy Abode; Swift Animations

Original release
- Network: YouTube
- Release: November 17, 2019 – present

Gemini Home Entertainment is a horror anthology web series created by Canadian YouTuber Remy Abode and periodically released on a YouTube channel of the same name. The story unfolds through a collection of deceptive, low-fidelity VHS tapes, documenting an extraterrestrial invasion and the impending apocalyptic event orchestrated by a planet-sized sentient cosmic entity, called The Iris. Blending elements of cosmic horror, surrealism, parasitism, body horror, and Native American mythology, it is widely considered one of the best and most influential analog horror series ever made.

The main series, also known as the Full Boxset, is ongoing. Further videos have also been released since as part of the spin-off series Library.

== Plot ==
In the 1980s and '90s, an eponymous video distribution company named Gemini Home Entertainment compiles a mixture of educational, commercial, public service announcement, and home video VHS footage from a variety of other fictional companies, such as Regnad Computing, Harbinge Technologies, and Optica! Video. The videos are complete with lo-fi music reminiscent of similar real-life videos.

The different episodes are superficially self contained, exploring topics such as wildlife, artificial intelligence, and the Solar System, but together they build a cohesive narrative and serve to document the impending end of the world. The series includes threats such as extraterrestrial creatures ("Woodcrawlers") using humans as "vessels", a fictional infectious disease called "Deep Root Disease", and a fictional plant-like organism called "Nature's Mockery" that mutilates people with which it comes into contact. Videos typically begin in a mundane way before incorporating horror elements. The series' central antagonist is The Iris, a sentient planet or planet-like entity that is masterminding an invasion of the Solar System and is influencing life on Earth.

== Episodes ==
The main series of Gemini Home Entertainment began in 2019 and appears to be ongoing. The episodes were later organized into a playlist on the official YouTube channel under the title Gemini Home Entertainment Full Boxset. A spin-off series, Library, premiered on the same YouTube channel in 2021. Library contains shorter and "secret" episodes that do not follow the format of the main episodes and focus on exploring some of the more misunderstood and confusing concepts introduced in the main series.

=== Full Boxset (2019–2021) ===
==== Main episodes ====
| No. | Title | Directed by | Written by | Length | Original release date |
|---|---|---|---|---|---|
| 1 | "WORLD'S WEIRDEST ANIMALS" | Remy Abode | Remy Abode | 8:09 | November 17, 2019 |
An educational video detailing the behavior and habitats of animals in rural Minnesota. It gives information about the greater prairie chicken, the burrowing owl, and a third creature called the "Woodcrawler", which is described as a predatory organism that nests in large family homes. The cameraman investigates an infested house and captures a pair of their long, spider-like appendages. The cameraman returns to the house at night, where "Fake People" can be seen, seemingly doppelgangers of humans who display bizarre and erratic behavior. After some time passes, a Fake Person notices the cameraman and gives chase, forcing them to flee.
| 2 | "STORM SAFETY TIPS" | Remy Abode | Remy Abode | 4:38 | November 24, 2019 |
An instructional video created by Harbinge Technologies guides how to protect oneself and one's family during a storm. The video emphasizes the importance of adequate preparation, which includes reinforcing your home, installing an early warning system, and building a storm bunker. The bunker is outlined with specific requirements it must meet, including the installation of a shortwave radio, which should be activated in emergencies only. In the event of a storm, viewers are advised to take their families to a shelter and turn on the radio immediately, ignoring any unusual sounds it may produce. The instructions also include several troubling and cryptic messages. After the storm, viewers should assess the condition of their home. If the home is severely damaged, they should check for any signs of movement inside. Hearing a chime indicates that the storm has passed. However, if they see 'lights' in the distance, they must return to their bunker for safety. Finally, viewers are instructed to listen for sounds of something crawling underneath the floor before returning to the original broadcast tone to conclude.
| 3 | "ARTIFICIAL COMPUTER LEARNING" | Remy Abode | Remy Abode | 5:03 | December 29, 2019 |
A presentation of a new artificial intelligence system created by Regnad Computing capable of formatting short stories. Three iterations of a story about someone named Mary following Jack over a river to find a secret are shown, with brief analysis of their content. The footage distorts and then presents two unsettling versions of an extraterrestrial entity without any analysis. Following this, two slides are briefly displayed, showcasing two circular objects of different sizes; the larger one appears to be focused on the smaller object, seemingly causing it to sprout appendages and develop something resembling an eye. The tape cuts back to the original presentation and concludes.
| 4 | "OUR SOLAR SYSTEM" | Remy Abode | Remy Abode | 4:59 | January 24, 2020 |
An educational video giving general information about the major bodies of the Solar System. A map of the Solar System is shown, displaying the Sun, the eight planets, Pluto, and an additional object between Neptune and Pluto. The information given has several oddities and discrepancies compared to the actual Solar System: Earth is listed as "one of the only planets in [the] Solar System capable of supporting life" and is incorrectly stated to be 149 million miles away from the Sun (instead of 149 million kilometers). The Great Red Spot on Jupiter is described not as an eye but as an "open wound". Saturn's rings are called "the Gateway", while Neptune is said to have been "mutated", and its Great Dark Spot is called "the Lens". The planet begins rotating toward the Great Dark Spot, changing to resemble an eye beginning to open. The video identifies the mysterious object as "The Iris", whose image distorts into what resembles an eye darting before focusing intently on the center of the screen. The video cuts to footage of Neptune firing an intense beam of light toward the other planets. The video returns to a section on Pluto before concluding.
| 5 | "CAMP INFORMATION VIDEO" | Remy Abode | Remy Abode | 5:19 | March 3, 2020 |
This tape contains an informational video on the Moonlight Acres camp, showcasing its activities, accommodations, and mythos. Over the course of the tape's runtime, it is established that Moonlight Acres is host to numerous alien and paranormal phenomena, including beings described as Skinwalkers which haunt the campground and hunt for visitors, and enigmatic 'Well-Dressed Men' that made a deal with the staff for an unspecified provision in return for human sacrifices.
| 6 | "LETHAL OMEN COMMERCIAL" | Remy Abode | Remy Abode | 6:00 | April 10, 2020 |
This tape contains a commercial for the PlayStation-esque game Lethal Omen. (Note: Lethal Omen was later made into a real playable short video game by the developer Alpine Arts; the multiple endings of the game serve to build on the narrative of the series and hold keys to understanding its central mystery.) set at the Moonlight Acres camp.
| 7 | "WILDERNESS SURVIVAL GUIDE" | Remy Abode | Remy Abode | 7:20 | May 6, 2020 |
This tape contains an instructional video on how to survive in the wild, including preparations and items to bring, as well as animals and plant life to avoid. One of the plants featured is named Nature's Mockery - a name previously used to describe the Woodcrawlers in "World's Weirdest Animals" - and is described as causing 'hallucinations, sudden muscular paralysis, body disfigurement' and 'flesh decay'.
| 8 | "SLEEP IMAGE VISUALIZER" | Remy Abode | Remy Abode | 5:25 | June 19, 2020 |
This tape is a setup guide for the Sleep Image Visualizer, a device developed by Harbinge Technologies that can produce video representations of a person's dreams. The instructions are interrupted with footage of dreams recorded by other Sleep Image Visualizer users, including Levi Jacobs, a staff member at Moonlight Acres, and Jack Dean, the creator of Wilderness Survival Guide.
| 9 | "GAMES FOR KIDS" | Remy Abode | Remy Abode | 5:36 | July 10, 2020 |
This tape showcases several children's games and includes instructions for how to play, introducing hide-and-seek, freeze tag, sardines and 'Feed the Woods', a game in which the children's instructions are to wait until their parents have fallen asleep, sneak outside the house with their friends, walk until they can no longer see the lights anymore, enter the forest, and scream at the top of their lungs. Numerous images appear within the forest, featuring a flashing red arrow pointing to a dark, unknown area, with an illustration of a crying child at the end of each image. During the episode, a police car is shown parked outside of the forest at dusk, when a woodcrawler (or perhaps multiple Woodcrawlers) suddenly emerges from the ground and devours it. As this happens, text explains that the game ends when the "forest is fed." The final image shows an image of Earth with a red arrow pointing at it, along with text that reads "Found you!"
| 10 | "ADVANCED MINING VEHICLE" | Remy Abode | Remy Abode | 6:50 | August 7, 2020 |
This tape showcases the new Remote-Operated Compact Tunneller (ROCT), an advanced and camera-equipped mining vehicle. On its voyage through a cavern system deep within the Earth's crust, the ROCT encounters a 'Garden', a meat-like carpet of vegetation tended to by the 'Gardeners', giant spider-like beings similar in appearance to Woodcrawlers. The Gardeners capture the machine and trap it within the mass of plants, whereupon its cameras observe a Woodcrawler emerging from a network of 'veins' on the cavern's walls. The vehicle shakes itself free but falls to the cavern floor, seemingly destroyed.
| 11 | "DEEP ROOT DISEASE" | Remy Abode | Remy Abode | 4:44 | October 2, 2020 |
This tape contains an educational film about Deep Root Disease, explaining how the disease progresses and how to diagnose it through observation and inquiry. The disease is caused by a type of organism known as a 'Root,' which can be a plant or a fungus-like parasite. While the film initially describes the disease as one that affects plants, it quickly becomes clear that these roots are obligate parasites of humans. As they grow and develop, they mutate the bodies of their hosts.
| 12 | "MONTHLY PROGRESS REPORT" | Remy Abode | Remy Abode | 6:38 | October 31, 2020 |
This tape contains a progress report on the development of artificial intelligence since "Artificial Computer Learning", showcasing developments in computer processing, predictive advancement, and artificial intelligence. The text introduces "Project Infrared" and its management crew, stating its goal is to prevent technological failures for Regnad and advance technology. It mentions an unidentified client aiding Regnad. Footage shows computers with fleshy tendrils and prompts for the client, alongside images of a gardener's eye and a satellite array aimed at the night sky, suggesting the client is The Iris. The first prompt is "Earth", to which The Iris responds with: MARY SEES THE GATEWAY DIE; SLEEPING ONES ARE EATEN WHOLE; THE VESSEL FLOATS INTO THE MAW; THE JAW UNHINGES The second prompt is "Moonlight" (referring to Moonlight Acres), to which The Iris responds with: NEW THINGS ROAM THE FEEDING GROUNDS; THE HARBINGER GUARDS IN VAIN; MARY HEARS A CREAKING SOUND; THE HUNGRY EYE IS WELCOMED/COMING SOON The final prompt is "Jack." In response, the Iris repeats, "Jack is with us now," four times. It then states, "Jack is us now," suggesting that Jack Dean has been infected with Deep Root Disease. The scene shifts to show the satellite array being engulfed in shadow. The tape concludes with Regnad mentioning that they expect to meet their client in person within 7 months.
| 13 | "CHRISTMAS EVE PARTY" | Remy Abode | Remy Abode | 4:38 | December 26, 2020 |
This tape contains a home video of a Christmas party at the Moonlight Acres camp. The party is interrupted by an unknown creature, resulting in the deaths of several people and the infection of Barry Johnson, the camp's assistant activity supervisor, with Deep Root Disease.
| 14 | "HOME INVASION HELP" | Remy Abode | Remy Abode | 5:40 | March 18, 2021 |
This tape contains safety tips and advice for how to prepare for, and what to do during, a home invasion. However, it turns out that the tape is actually an instruction for the Woodcrawlers to enter the victim's home, with the actual intention cleverly hidden under the pretext of 'countering home invasions'. Right after the tutorial ends, it cuts to footage of a person entering a house. Said house has seemingly been "invaded", with red mycelium-like growths everywhere; some seemingly forming humanoid shapes, indicating that these are actually what remains of the victims of Deep Root Disease. One figure has a yellow eye that turns to face the camera. Near the end of the tape, the person notices a woodcrawler's shadow inside the house and tries to escape, but trips and drops their camera. The woodcrawler then kills them, and the tape ends.
| 15 | "CRUSADER PROBE MISSION" | Remy Abode | Remy Abode | 7:00 | July 5, 2021 |
This tape contains the documentation of the Crusader 5 mission, in which a space probe documents the outer planets and their moons, visiting Jupiter, Saturn, and The Iris. While travelling through the Solar System, numerous anomalous moons, asteroids, and trans-Neptunian objects (including the disproven hypothetical moons Chiron and Themis) are found by the probe, and Saturn's rings are unusually narrow. Neptune is mysteriously absent from where it should be. When Crusader 5 arrives at The Iris, it notices the planet's five moons before venturing into its depths. There, it discovers that The Iris is sentient and directly responsible for the existence of the Gardeners, Roots, and Woodcrawlers. On its way to The Iris's "conscious mind", it sees an immense network of Gardens, only to be swiftly sent back toward Earth, seemingly by The Iris itself.

==== Non-canonical episodes ====
Note: The following episodes have been removed from the series and are no longer part of the canon.

| No. | Title | Directed by | Written by | Length | Original release date |
|---|---|---|---|---|---|
| 1 | "THE DEEP BLUE" | Remy Abode | Remy Abode | 4:51 | December 6, 2019 |
This tape, created by Gyneva Production Company, is an informational video about the deep ocean. The first part of the video concerns life in the ocean, although several points are incorrect, such as its citation that the blue whale often eats fish whole (the blue whale's diet consists almost entirely of krill and is incapable of consuming larger creatures), and that the stingray carries deadly poison in its tail (it would be considered venom in this case, and the venom is not necessarily deadly in all cases). The second part of the video transitions to habitats, where it mentions the Marianas Trench (erroneously displaying a photo of the Great Blue Hole off the coast of Belize), then abruptly begins describing the fictional Demisia Tunnel, an even deeper section of the trench. After on-screen text gives the ominous message 'Nothing can live in the Marianas Trench.', footage of a giant creature resembling a Gardener with a single glowing eye is shown. A garbled noise begins to play as the footage begins violently shaking, before cutting to static.

In addition to the sixteen released episodes, Abode has also released two cancelled episodes through their Patreon, "Your Best Self" (July 22, 2021) and "Basics of Broadcast" (May 17, 2022), though neither episode is considered to be canonical to the series.

=== Library (2021–present) ===
A new set of episodes titled "Library" has been released, which expands on the lore established in the Box set. These episodes provide specific information about the "deal" related to the Moonlight Acres Family Camp, the creature from the "Christmas Eve Party," and the effects of Deep Root Disease on individuals.

| No. | Title | Directed by | Written by | Length | Original release date |
|---|---|---|---|---|---|
| 1 | "WRETCHED HANDS" | Remy Abode | Remy Abode | 3:43 | December 24, 2021 (Original); March 2, 2022 (Reupload) |
The tape begins by showing a recording of a NOAA weather report with footage from a lake called Lake Mounteback in Canada, dated Christmas Eve, approximately '25 minutes before first attack'. The footage shows a brief explosion in the background. A letter from Glenn Arthur, the administrator of Moonlight Acres Camp during the 1930s and 1940s, is dated May 3, 1946. In this letter, he intends to break his agreement with the Well-Dressed Men by offering a bear as a sacrifice instead of a human. He declares that he will no longer be a pawn for the aliens. A second letter with an unclear date in May 1946 is then shown, reading: 'Wretched hands tap my window. A stranger's fangs scrape the walls.' Photographs of the "Christmas Eve Party" creature show that it has grown massive by assimilating humans into its body, including Glenn Arthur, and that it has "lost all resemblance to a bear."
| 2 | "SHIFTING TENDONS" | Remy Abode | Remy Abode | 6:38 | March 2, 2022 |
This video documents the progression of Barry Johnson's case of Deep Root Disease. Over 59 days, the infection steadily degrades his body, turning him into a mass of seething, root-like structures while he is still alive, and eventually transforming him into a specimen of Nature's Mockery. In the final scene, the camera zooms into Barry's insides, and the text on the screen reveals that they are "inhabited."
| 3 | "OLD BONES" | Remy Abode | Remy Abode | 5:14 | June 9, 2023 |
An audio recording is played, discussing the nature of Deep Root Disease. It is implied that the disease can manipulate living tissue, and that it progressively transforms the flesh of those afflicted with it, rather than killing them outright, though several small portions appear to have been redacted. Excerpts from Glenn Arthur's diary are presented, detailing his encounter and eventual deal with the Well-Dressed Men from "Camp Information Video," whom he believed to be angels. Included is a drawing of an energy beam emerging from Neptune, reminiscent of the one seen in "Our Solar System," being one of the visions Arthur experienced. The diary recounts how a deal was made with the Well-Dressed Men in 1941 and later broken in 1946, as described in "Wretched Hands." Three new iterations from Regnad Computing's AI are shown, with the third implying that the victims of the "Bear" retain consciousness, even after being assimilated by the beast: I AM STILL IN HERE; RELIC OF THE FAITHLESS DAY; DON'T LEAVE ME YOU BASTARDS; OLD BONE GROWS. Silent footage from Moonlight Acres plays, ending with a close-up of a window from inside one of the cabins. Through the window, a humanoid figure with a distorted body—likely Glenn Arthur, now merged with the "Bear"—appears to speak briefly before quickly moving away.
| 4 | "OPEN MINDS" | Remy Abode | Remy Abode | 26:39 | September 19, 2026 |
Regnad Computing unveils their new home AI assistant, "Casey". One user, Susan Harris, begins using the program and finds it normal during her interactions. However, when her daughter Judy uses it, Casey becomes manipulative. Casey convinces Judy to answer the door when a Woodcrawler knocks, leading to her attack and disappearance. After some time, Susan continues working with Casey, who slowly reveals what happened to Judy. A computer terminal begins repeating Susan's name and prompts her to listen to a voicemail from Judy, which captures her terrified screams while being taken to the Garden. When Susan tries to call 911, Casey intercepts the call with its voice. Susan then sees Judy, now a Woodcrawler, who kills Paul, her husband. Susan hides but is eventually caught and infected with Deep Root Disease, leaving bizarre voicemails about her transformation until her death, implying that "Judy" fully emerged and claimed her before being taken to the Garden.

== Video game ==
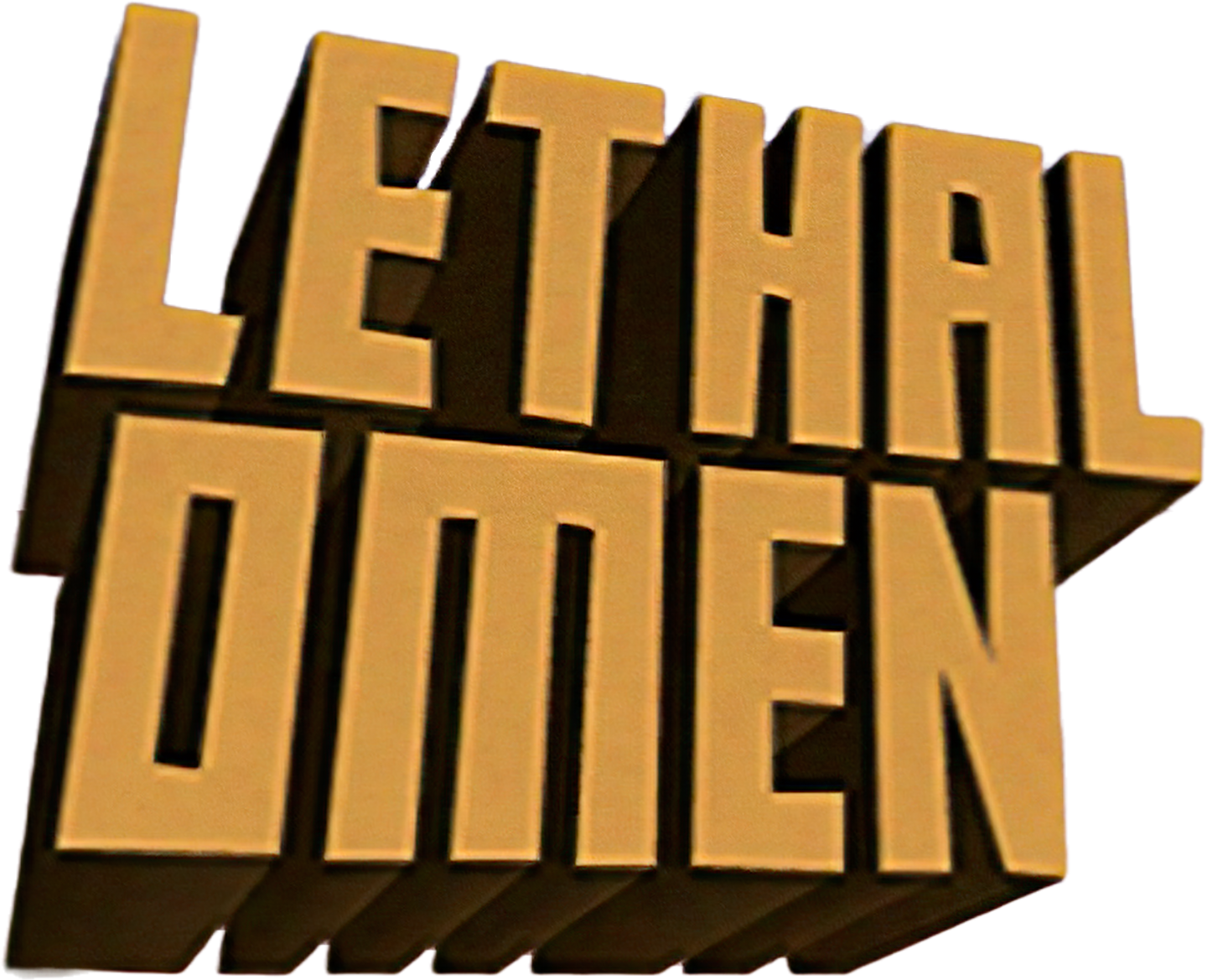
Logo of the game

A horror, first-person shooter video game called LETHAL OMEN was created as a tie-in to the series. It was developed by Alpine Arts and published on September 22, 2020.

The game is set at the in-universe "Moonlight Acres Family Camp". The player is armed with a gun and faces enemies scattered around the map. There are several keys to collect and five unique endings.

The game has builds available for Windows and MacOS.

== Development ==
The Gemini Home Entertainment YouTube channel belongs to psuedonymous creator Remy Abode. He chose to develop videos in the analog horror genre thanks to its low barrier to entry. Said Adobe, "you can create an entire short film without recording a single video or snapping a single photo. It also helps me disguise choppy VFX shots underneath a layer of static." The storyline of the series was inspired by creepypasta, mythological creatures such as wendigos and skin-walkers, and classic science fiction horror films like Alien (1979) and The Thing (1982). The in-universe campsite "Moonlight Acres" pulls from the films The Endless (2017) and The Ritual (2017). Abode made the decision to largely exclude jump scares from Gemini Home Entertainment due to finding horror more effective when it did not "provide the climactic release that a jumpscare brings" and instead simply maintained prolonged tension.

The series makes heavy use of stock footage, though Abode begins to incorporate his own footage as the series progresses. Abode uses the free video editing software Hitfilm Express to create the VHS effects used in every video, FL Studio for the series' sound design, and Sketchbook for designing and drawing the different creatures. Some of the videos contain 3D models created by Abode's friend Swift Animations. Abode has described creating the effects as a "wildly messy and complicated" process. Almost all of the music used in Gemini Home Entertainment is sourced from old music albums from the 1980s and 90s, typically sourced from YouTube playlists.

== Reception ==
Gemini Home Entertainment is regarded as one of the most iconic analog horror series and is typically regarded as one of the premier examples of the genre, alongside Local 58. Bailee Perkins of Hyperreal Film Club wrote in a 2022 review that Gemini Home Entertainment was her "favorite analog horror series to date" and that it was planned out and executed in a great way. Nestor Kok of F Newsmagazine also praised the series in 2022, calling it "as novel as it is ambitious" and praising its horror relying on growing anxiety, unease and a slow realization of the impending end of the world, rather than gore and jump scares.

Tanner Fox of Screen Rant referred to Gemini Home Entertainment in 2021 as "nearly as notorious as Local 58" and found the series to be "eerily authentic" and "an absolute much-watch for those who enjoy this sort of lo-fi horror". Lacey Womack, also of Screen Rant, assessed Gemini Home Entertainment in 2022 as "excruciatingly strange", "tough to follow" and one of the best video-based alternate reality games. Gemini Home Entertainment was also positively reviewed by Alicia Szczesniak of The Post, who noted that "the horror of this series comes from the helplessness experienced by the victims of the beings in this series", no one being safe in the situations depicted.
