= Thirty-first of the month =

Recurring ordinal calendar date

The thirty-first of the month or thirty-first day of the month is the recurring calendar date position corresponding to the day numbered 31 of each month. In the Gregorian calendar (and other calendars that number days sequentially within a month), this day occurs in seven month of the year, January, March, May, July, August, October, and December.

- Thirty-first of January
- Thirty-first of March
- Thirty-first of May
- Thirty-first of July
- Thirty-first of August
- Thirty-first of October
- Thirty-first of December

In addition to these dates, this date occurs in months of many other calendars, such as the Bengali calendar and the Hebrew calendar.

== See also ==
- 31st (disambiguation)
- The Thirty-First of February, 1949, American fantasy story collection
