= Hall (lunar crater) =

Crater on the Moon

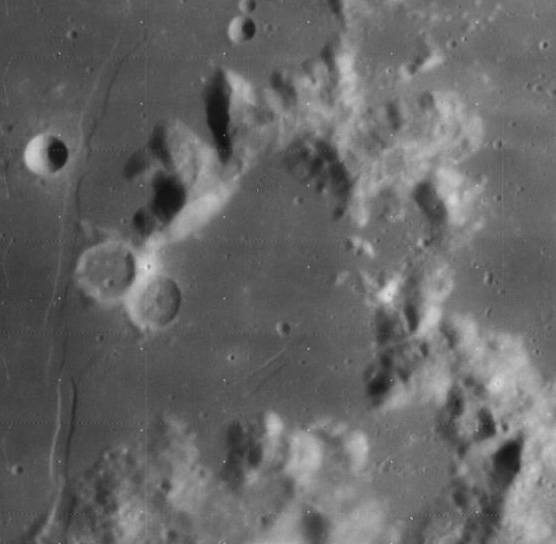
- Lunar Orbiter 4 image
- Coordinates: 33.7°N 37.0°E
- Diameter: 35 km
- Depth: 1.1 km
- Colongitude: 323° at sunrise
- Eponym: Asaph Hall

Hall is a lunar impact crater in the southeast part of the Lacus Somniorum, a lunar mare in the northeast part of the Moon. It was named after American astronomer Asaph Hall. This feature can be found to the east of a prominent walled plain called Posidonius. Just to the south, and nearly attached to the southern rim of Hall is the smaller crater G. Bond.

This crater formation has been significantly disintegrated by smaller impacts around the outer rim, leaving a wall that is deeply notched and incised. There is a gap in the western rim through which the interior has been flooded and resurfaced by layers of basaltic lava. Thus all that remains of the original crater is an irregular, crescent-shaped formation along the southern edge of the Lacus Somniorum. The southern rim is attached to the rough terrain to the south of the mare, and the irregular satellite crater G. Bond G is attached to the southeast rim.

Passing across the open mouth of this crater is the rille named Rima G. Bond (after the nearby crater), a wide cleft in the surface of the mare. This feature begins to the north of Hall and travels to the south-southwest, gradually bending back to the south-southeast. It passes through a section of raised terrain along the southern edge of the mare, and this rise joins the southern rim of Hall and encloses G. Bond.

== Satellite craters ==
By convention these features are identified on lunar maps by placing the letter on the side of the crater midpoint that is closest to Hall.

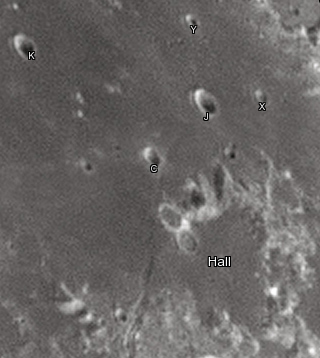
Hall crater and its satellite craters taken from Earth in 2012 at the University of Hertfordshire's Bayfordbury Observatory with the telescopes Meade LX200 14" and Lumenera Skynyx 2-1

Hall	Latitude	Longitude	Diameter
C	34.7° N	35.8° E	6 km
J	35.4° N	36.9° E	8 km
K	35.5° N	34.2° E	8 km
X	35.7° N	37.8° E	4 km
Y	36.4° N	36.9° E	4 km
