= W. Bond (crater) =

Crater on the Moon

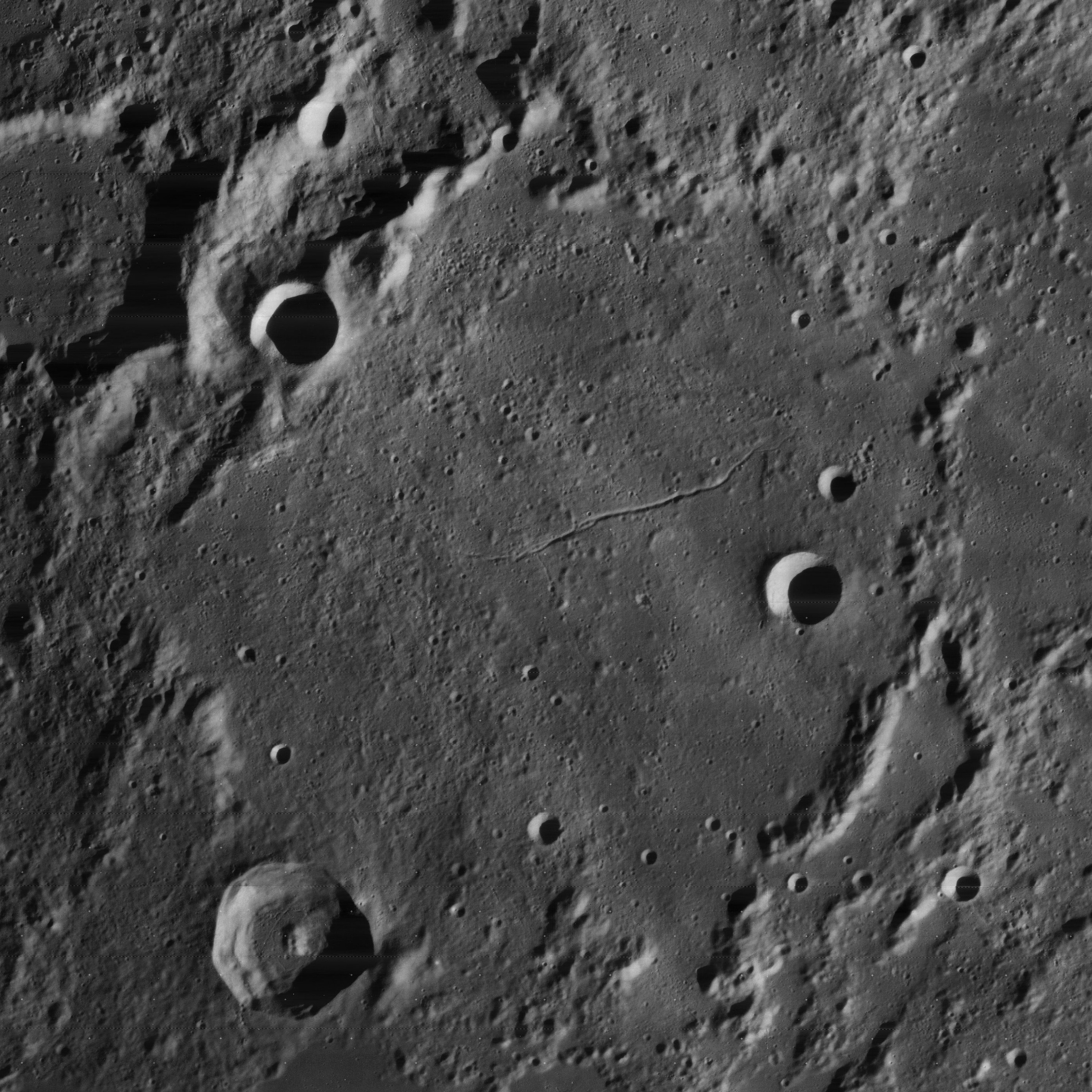
- Lunar Orbiter 4 image
- Coordinates: 65.3°N 4.5°E
- Diameter: 156 km
- Depth: Unknown
- Colongitude: 2° at sunrise
- Formation: Pre-Nectarian
- Eponym: William C. Bond

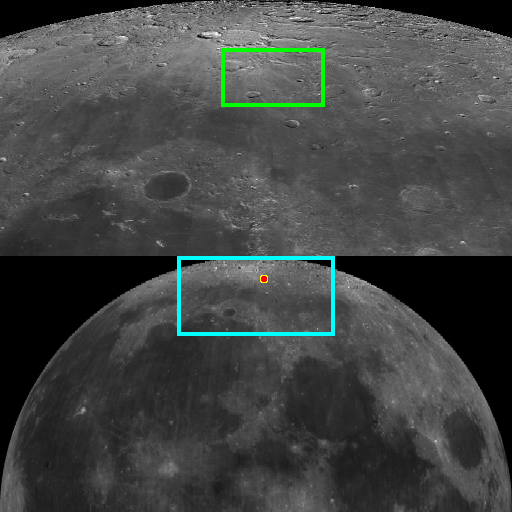
Location of W. Bond

W. Bond is an irregularly shaped walled plain that is located in the northern part of the Moon, to the north of the Mare Frigoris. It lies to the east of the crater Birmingham, and south-southwest of Barrow. Epigenes is located just to the northwest of the outer rim. Along the southwest edge, between W. Bond and the lunar mare, is the crater Timaeus.

What remains of the outer rim of W. Bond has been eroded and reshaped until it now consists of little more than an outline of hills and mounts. The most prominent of these is a nearly linear range along the northwest rim, which is divided in half by the satellite crater Epigenes A. The southeast rim is also relatively well defined, but the remainder is irregular, notched, and not very prominent.

The interior floor is relatively flat in comparison with the rim region, although there are sections of rough terrain near the northern rim. In the center of the walled plain is a narrow rille that runs toward the eastern rim. To the southeast of this formation is W. Bond B, a circular, bowl-shaped crater. The smaller W. Bond C is located just to the northeast.

In older publications this formation was identified as W. C. Bond.

== Satellite craters ==
By convention these features are identified on lunar maps by placing the letter on the side of the crater midpoint that is closest to W. Bond.

W. Bond	Latitude	Longitude	Diameter
B	64.9° N	7.6° E	15 km
C	65.6° N	8.2° E	7 km
D	63.5° N	3.2° E	7 km
E	63.8° N	9.1° E	25 km
F	64.5° N	9.6° E	9 km
G	63.0° N	7.0° E	4 km

The satellite feature B includes a permanently shadowed region where the sunlight never reaches.

== See also ==
- Asteroid 767 Bondia
- G. Bond (crater) on the Moon
- Bond (crater) on Mars
