= 31st Group =

31st Group may refer to:

- 31 Canadian Brigade Group, a unit of the Canadian Army
- Marine Aircraft Group 31, a unit of the United States Marine Corps
- 31st Operations Group, a unit of the United States Air Force

== See also ==
- 31st Division (disambiguation)
- 31st Brigade (disambiguation)
- 31st Regiment (disambiguation)
- 31st Battalion (disambiguation)
- 31st Squadron (disambiguation)
