= 31st Reconnaissance Squadron =

31st Reconnaissance Squadron may refer to:

- 31st Reconnaissance Squadron (Heavy), active from 3 February 1942 to 16 March 1942 and assigned to the 303d Bombardment Group.
- 31st Tactical Reconnaissance Squadron, designated the '31st Reconnaissance Squadron (Fighter)' from April 1943 to August 1943
- 33d Network Warfare Squadron, designated the '31st Reconnaissance Squadron (Night Photographic)' from September 1947 to November 1947
- 31st Test and Evaluation Squadron, designated the '31st Reconnaissance Squadron, Very Long Range (Photographic)' and '31st Reconnaissance Squadron, Very Long Range (Photographic - Radio Countermeasures)' from October 1947 to June 1949

== See also ==
- 31st Army Reconnaissance Squadron
- 31st Photographic Reconnaissance Squadron
- 31st Strategic Reconnaissance Squadron
- 31st Tactical Reconnaissance Squadron
- 31st Tactical Reconnaissance Training Squadron
