= Chiron (hypothetical moon) =

Hypothetical moon of Saturn

Chiron (Greek: Χείρων) is the name given to a supposed natural satellite of Saturn sighted by Hermann Goldschmidt in 1861. It has since been determined that no such moon exists.

Hermann Goldschmidt announced the discovery of the ninth moon of Saturn in April 1861, which, he said, orbited between Titan and Hyperion. Goldschmidt's discovery was never confirmed, and Chiron was never observed again.

In 1898, William Henry Pickering discovered Phoebe, which is now considered the ninth moon of Saturn. Strangely, in 1905, Pickering believed that he had discovered another moon of Saturn, which, he reported, orbited the planet between Titan and Hyperion. He called this new moon Themis. Themis, like Chiron, was never sighted again.

An object, now classified as a centaur, which was discovered in 1977, is named 2060 Chiron.

== See also ==
- List of hypothetical Solar System objects
