= C/1850 Q1 (Bond) =

Parabolic comet

Discovery
- Discovered by: George P. Bond
- Discovery site: Cambridge, Massachusetts
- Discovery date: 30 August 1850

Designations
- Alternative designations: 1850 II

Orbital characteristics
- Epoch: 19 October 1850 (JD 2397050.3374)
- Observation arc: 76 days
- Number of observations: 103
- Perihelion: 0.565 AU
- Eccentricity: ~1.000
- Orbital period: ~46,000 years
- Inclination: 40.062°
- Longitude of ascending node: 208.11°
- Argument of periapsis: 243.20°
- Last perihelion: 19 October 1850
- Comet total magnitude (M1): 7.9

Bond's Comet, formally known as C/1850 Q1, is a non-periodic comet that was observed through telescopes throughout late 1850. It was the only comet discovered independently by American astronomer, George Phillips Bond.

== Discovery and observations ==
The comet was discovered by George Phillips Bond as a "faint, telescopic object" in the constellation Camelopardalis, about 10° north of the star α Per on 29 August 1850. It gradually brightened during the first weeks of September 1850, allowing further observations of the comet to be conducted by various other observatories around the globe. On 18 September, Richard Carrington noted that the comet is best seen with a Fraunhofer refractor. The comet reached perihelion on 19 October, however the comet was difficult to observe at this time due to its low position in the twilight skies. It was last observed on 14 November 1850.

Initial orbital calculations in the 19th century showed the comet has a weakly-bound parabolic orbit with an orbital period of 46,000 years. Recalculations in 2003 suggested a hyperbolic trajectory instead, based on 103 observations of the comet.
