= Jarilo (crater) =

Crater on Hyperion, Saturn

- Feature type: Crater
- Location: Hyperion
- Coordinates: 61.00°N 177.00°W
- Discoverer: M. Ya. Marov (Russia) on January 3, 1981
- Naming: 1982
- Eponym: Yarilo, East Slavic god

Jarilo is a crater on Hyperion, a moon of Saturn. The crater was named after Yarilo, the eponymous East Slavic god of the sun, fertility and love. The name "Jarilo" was officially approved by the International Astronomical Union (IAU) in 1982.

== Geology and characteristics ==
Its coordinates are 61.00°N 177.00°W, and the nearest crater, Bahloo, is 65 kilometres (40 mi), or one hour away.
