= 767 Bondia =

Asteroid from outer regions of the asteroid belt

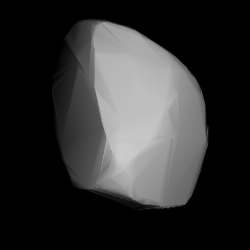
- Modelled shape of Bondia from its lightcurve

Discovery
- Discovered by: J. H. Metcalf
- Discovery site: Winchester Obs.
- Discovery date: 23 September 1913

Designations
- Named after: William Cranch Bond (1789–1859); George Phillips Bond (1825–1865) (American astronomers)
- Alternative designations: A913 SD · 1929 OA; 1933 FO_{1} · 1938 DQ_{2} 1957 UR · 1958 XA_{1} 1959 AD · A902 SA; 1913 SX
- Minor planet category: main-belt · (outer); Themis

Orbital characteristics
- Epoch 31 May 2020 (JD 2459000.5)
- Uncertainty parameter 0
- Observation arc: 117.59 yr (42,949 d)
- Aphelion: 3.6909 AU
- Perihelion: 2.5531 AU
- Semi-major axis: 3.1220 AU
- Eccentricity: 0.1822
- Orbital period (sidereal): 5.52 yr (2,015 d)
- Mean anomaly: 137.11°
- Mean motion: 0° 10^{m} 43.32^{s} / day
- Inclination: 2.4118°
- Longitude of ascending node: 79.324°
- Argument of perihelion: 269.09°

Physical characteristics
- Mean diameter: 43.039±0.396 km; 46.91±0.66 km
- Mass: (4.8±1.6)×10^{17} kg (Note: Calculated from its standard gravitational parameter GM = 0.032±0.011 km^{3}/s^{2}.)
- Mean density: 11.38 g/cm^{3} (Note: Assuming a diameter of 43 km.)
- Synodic rotation period: 8.3402±0.0007 h
- Geometric albedo: 0.084; 0.095±0.022
- Spectral type: SMASS = B
- Absolute magnitude (H): 10.00; 10.2

767 Bondia (prov. designation: A913 SD or 1913 SX) is a Themis asteroid from the outer regions of the asteroid belt, approximately 43 kilometers (27 miles) in diameter. It was discovered on 23 September 1913, by American astronomer Joel Hastings Metcalf at his observatory (799) in Winchester, Massachusetts. The B-type asteroid has a rotation period of 8.3 hours. It was named after William Cranch Bond (1789–1859) and his son George Phillips Bond (1825–1865), both American astronomers and directors of the Harvard College Observatory in Cambridge, Massachusetts.

== Orbit and classification ==
Bondia is a core member the Themis family (602), a very large family of carbonaceous asteroids, named after 24 Themis. It orbits the Sun in the outer main-belt at a distance of 2.6–3.7 AU once every 5 years and 6 months (2,015 days; semi-major axis of 3.12 AU). Its orbit has an eccentricity of 0.18 and an inclination of 2° with respect to the ecliptic.

The Themistian asteroid was first observed as A902 SA (1902 SA) at Heidelberg Observatory on 26 September 1902. The body's observation arc begins at Bergedorf Observatory in September 1915, or two years after its official discovery observation by Metcalf at Winchester Observatory.

== Naming ==
This minor planet was named after American astronomers William Cranch Bond (1789–1859) and his son George Phillips Bond (1825–1865), both directors of the Harvard College Observatory in Cambridge, Massachusetts. Former co-discovered Comet 1850 II and pioneered the use of photographic plates in astronomy. The latter is best known for his 1848 co-discovery of Hyperion, a moon of Saturn. He also discovered Saturn's faint C Ring, also known as Crepe Ring. The naming citation was mentioned in The Names of the Minor Planets by Paul Herget in 1955 (H 77). The lunar craters W. Bond and G. Bond were named in honor of the two American astronomers. In addition, Martian crater Bond was named after George Phillips.

== Physical characteristics ==
In the Bus–Binzel SMASS classification, Bondia is a B-type asteroid, a brighter variant of the common carbonaceous C-type asteroid.

=== Rotation period ===
In October 2018, a rotational lightcurve of Bondia was obtained from photometric observations by Mexican astronomers at the National Astronomical Observatory in San Pedro Mártir (OAN-SPM). Lightcurve analysis gave a well defined rotation period of 8.3402±0.0007 hours with a brightness variation of 0.27±0.02 magnitude (U=3) and supersedes a previous observation by Szabó from 2016, who determined a period of at least 60 hours and a low amplitude (U=2).

=== Diameter and albedo ===
According to the surveys carried out by the Japanese Akari satellite and the NEOWISE mission of NASA's Wide-field Infrared Survey Explorer (WISE), Bondia measures 43.039±0.396 and 46.91±0.66 kilometers in diameter and its surface has an albedo between 0.095±0.022 and 0.084, respectively. The Collaborative Asteroid Lightcurve Link derives an albedo of 0.0857 and a diameter of 41.40 kilometers based on an absolute magnitude of 10.2. Alternative mean diameter measurements published by the WISE team include (43.100±0.730 km), (45.3±4.5 km), (46.87±15.23 km) and (47±5 km) with corresponding albedos of (0.0956±0.0179), (0.9±0.02), (0.06±0.02) and (0.07±0.01).
