= G. Bond (crater) =

Impact crater

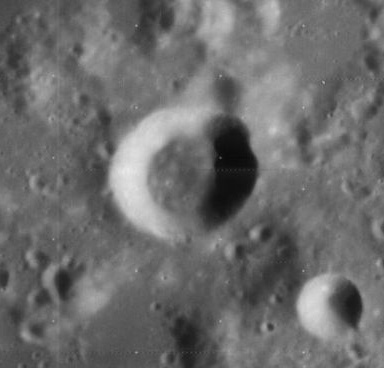
- Lunar Orbiter 4 image
- Coordinates: 32.4°N 36.2°E
- Diameter: 19.05 km (11.84 mi)
- Depth: 2.78 km (1.73 mi)
- Colongitude: 324° at sunrise
- Eponym: George P. Bond

G. Bond is a small lunar impact crater to the south of the Lacus Somniorum, a small lunar mare in the northeast part of the Moon's near side. It lies to the east of the larger crater Posidonius, and to the south of the flooded crater remnant Hall. The crater is situated in a rugged section of terrain to the northwest of the Montes Taurus mountain region.

This is a roughly circular crater that has not suffered significant degredation. It is a bright, sharp-edged, and bowl-shaped formation with an interior floor that is about half the diameter of the crater. The inner walls slope down from the rim, and lack any notable structure.

To the west of G. Bond is a prominent rille in the lava-flooded surface, designated the Rima G. Bond. This cleft follows a course roughly along a north–south orientation, and continues for a length of about 150 kilometers. The center of this feature is at 32.9° N, 35.3° E.

This crater is named after the American astronomer George Phillips Bond (1826–1865). His name was incorporated into the lunar nomenclature of English amateur astronomer William Radcliffe Birt during the 19th century. Its designation was formally adopted by the International Astronomical Union in 1935.

== Satellite craters ==
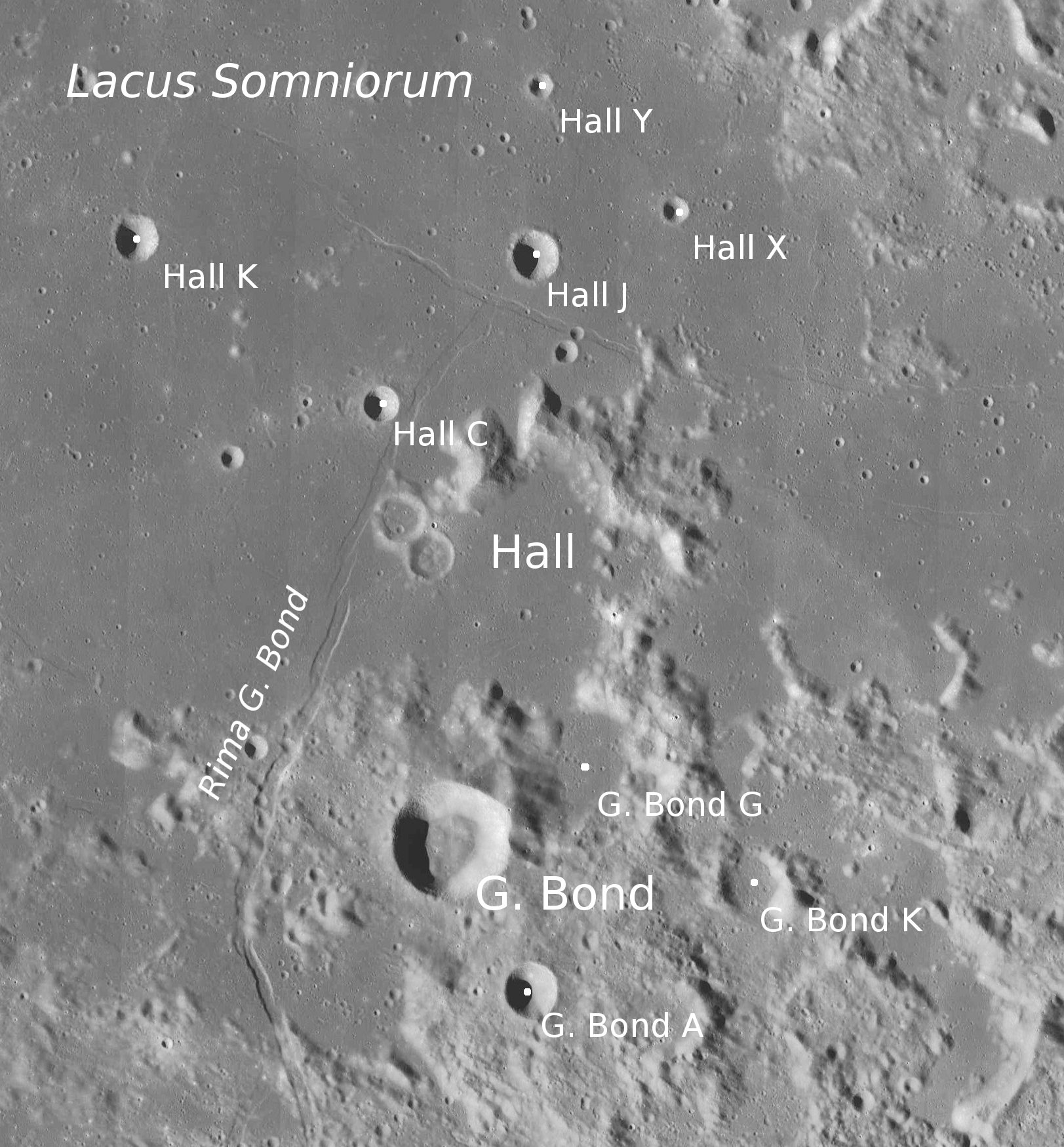
G. Bond satellite craters and surroundings

By convention these features are identified on lunar maps by placing the letter on the side of the crater midpoint that is closest to G. Bond.

G. Bond	Latitude	Longitude	Diameter
A	31.6° N	36.8° E	9 km
B	29.9° N	34.7° E	33 km
C	28.2° N	34.8° E	46 km
G	32.8° N	37.3° E	31 km
K	32.1° N	38.3° E	14 km

== See also ==
- Asteroid 767 Bondia
- W. Bond (crater) on the Moon
- Bond (crater) on Mars

== Sources ==
- Rükl, Antonín (1990). Atlas of the Moon. Kalmbach Books. ISBN 978-0-913135-17-4.
- Wlasuk, Peter T. (2000). Observing the Moon. Springer. ISBN 978-1-85233-193-1.
