= The Far Side of Nowhere =

- Dust-jacket illustration by Alan Fore for The Far Side of Nowhere
- Author: Nelson Bond
- Cover artist: Alan Fore, design by JenGraph
- Language: English
- Genre: Fantasy, horror
- Publisher: Arkham House
- Publication date: 2002
- Publication place: United States
- Media type: Print (hardback)
- Pages: vii, 423 pp
- ISBN: 0-87054-180-3
- OCLC: 48397635
- Dewey Decimal: 813/.54 21
- LC Class: PS3503.O4286 F37 2002

The Far Side of Nowhere is a collection of fantasy and horror stories by author Nelson Bond. It was released in 2002 and was the author's second book published by Arkham House. It was published in an edition of approximately 2,500 copies. The stories originally appeared in Amazing Stories, Blue Book, Fantastic Adventures, Weird Tales and other magazines.

== Contents ==
The Far Side of Nowhere contains the following tales:

1. "It's About Time"
  - "Command Performance"
  - "Parallel in Time"
  - "Time Exposure"
  - "Private Line to Tomorrow"
  - "The Castaway"
  - "The Message from the Void"
2. "Odds Without End"
  - "The Battle of Blue Trout Basin"
  - "The Unusual Romance of Ferdinand Pratt"
  - "The Ballad of Blaster Bill"
  - "Case History"
  - "Herman and the Mermaid"
  - "Double, Double, Toil and Trouble"
  - "Proof in the Pudding"
  - "Pawns of Tomorrow"
3. "Family Circle"
  - "Magic City"
  - "The Masked Marvel"
  - "The Scientific Pioneer Returns"
  - "Miracles Made Easy"
4. "In Uffish Thought
  - "The Amazing Invention of Wilberforce Weems"
  - "Brother Michel"
  - "Pipeline to Paradise"
  - "The World Within"
  - "The Geometrics of Johnny Day"
5. "Wild Talents"
  - "Mr. Snow White"
  - "The Unpremeditated Wizard"
  - "The Secret of Lucky Logan"
  - "The Fertility of Dalrymple Todd"
  - "The Man Who Weighed Minus Twelve"
  - "Occupation: Demigod"
6. Epilogue
