= 31st Infantry Brigade (Malaysia) =

31st Border Infantry Brigade 31st Infantry Brigade 31st Brigade
- Briged Ke-31 Infantri Malaysia, Rejimen Sempadan بريڬيد ك-31 ينفنتري مليسيا، ريجيمن سمڤادن
- Active: 2015–present
- Country: Malaysia
- Branch: Malaysian Army
- Type: Infantry formation
- Size: Brigade
- Part of: 1st Infantry Division
- Garrison/HQ: Bintulu, Sarawak

Commanders
- Current commander: Brig. Gen. Dato Kamarulzaman bin Hj Mohd Yunos

The 31st Infantry Brigade (Malay: Briged Ke-31 Infantri Malaysia) is an infantry formation of the Malaysian Army formed in 2015.

== History ==
As a response to the 2013 Lahad Datu standoff, the brigade was formed in 2015 as a territorial defence force, which was then based at Sibu. Battalions from the Border Regiment were the main force of the brigade.

In 2022, army chief Zamrose Mohd Zain announced that the 31st brigade will be relocated to Bintulu as part of the army restructuring process.

== Order of battle ==
=== 2016 ===
- 6th Battalion, Border Regiment
- 7th Battalion, Border Regiment
- 9th Battalion, Border Regiment
- 10th Battalion, Border Regiment

== Structure ==
As of 2025, the structure are as follows:

- 31st Infantry Brigade, Bintulu
  - Brigade Headquarters and HQ Company
  - 20th Battalion, Royal Malay Regiment
  - 7th Battalion, Border Regiment
  - 9th Battalion, Border Regiment

== See also ==
- Malaysian Army
- 1st Infantry Division
