= Nelson S. Bond =

American writer

Nelson Slade Bond
- Nelson S. Bond in 1979
- Born: November 23, 1908; Scranton, Pennsylvania, U.S.
- Died: November 4, 2006 (aged 97); Roanoke, Virginia, U.S.
- Education: Marshall University
- Spouse: Betty Gough Folsom (m. 1934)
- Children: Lynn Bond; Christopher Bond
- Writing career
- Language: English
- Period: 1937–1959
- Genres: Science fiction, fantasy, western, crime, drama
- Notable awards: Nebula Author Emeritus (1998)

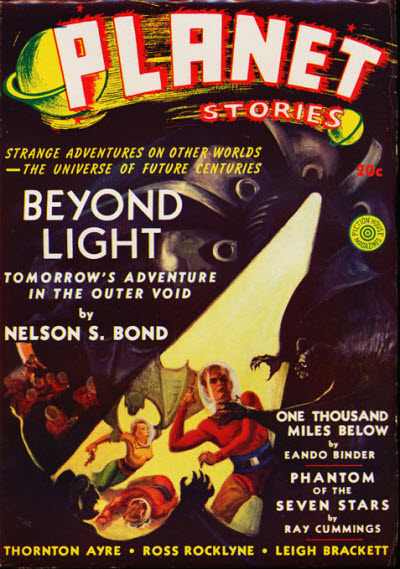
Bond's "Beyond Light" was the cover story in the Winter 1940 issue of Planet Stories

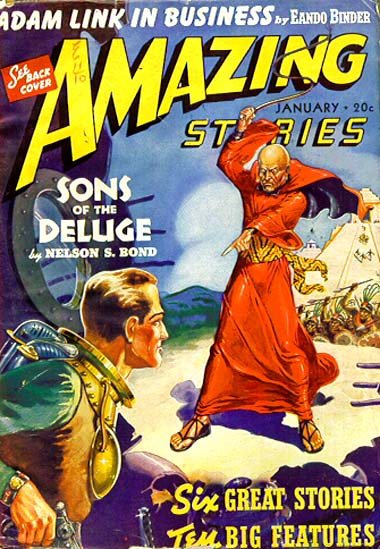
The first installment of Bond's "Sons of the Deluge" was cover-feature on the January 1940 issue of Amazing Stories

Nelson Slade Bond (November 23, 1908 – November 4, 2006) was an American writer. His works included books, magazine articles, and scripts used in radio, for television and on the stage.

The 1998 recipient of the Nebula Author Emeritus award for lifetime achievement, Bond was a pioneer in early science fiction and fantasy. His published fiction is mainly short stories, most of which appeared in pulp magazines in the 1930s and 1940s. Many were published in Blue Book magazine, though Bond largely retired from fiction writing after the 1950s. He is noted for his "Lancelot Biggs" series of stories and for his "Meg the Priestess" tales, which introduced one of the first powerful female characters in science fiction.

== Early life ==
Bond's parents, Richard Slade Bond and Mary Bond, were from Nova Scotia, but moved to Scranton, Pennsylvania shortly before his birth in that city. The family later relocated to Philadelphia after World War I. In high school, Bond reviewed plays for The Philadelphia Inquirer. He worked for an insurance company during the Great Depression before enrolling in a college. He attended Marshall College in Huntington, West Virginia from 1932 to 1934. While at Marshall, he contributed to the Huntington Herald Advertiser and edited the college newspaper, The Parthenon. He met his future wife, Betty Gough Folsom, while at Marshall, and they married in 1934.

After graduating, Bond briefly worked for his father's public relations agency. Shortly after joining, he was offered the position of public relations field director for the province of Nova Scotia. This involved meeting celebrities visiting the province and writing pieces about them that were placed in various periodicals.

He started selling fiction when he realised he could make more money by writing, sending works to newspapers, pulp magazines and the more upmarket "slick" magazines.

He started by writing sports stories but made his first significant sale with "Mr. Mergenthwerker's Lobblies", which was published in Scribner's Magazine in 1937. His first science fiction story was "Down the Dimensions" in the April 1937 issue of Astounding. He only wrote occasional non-fiction once he was established as an author of fiction. Bond wrote and sold more for Blue Book than the pulps, which was not only more prestigious but paid more for his work.

He also published articles on philately and served on the Board of Governors / Board of Directors of the British North America Philatelic Society.

== Radio and television ==
Bond wrote for such radio programs as Dr. Christian, Hot Copy (1943–44) and The Sheriff (1944–51), a continuation of Death Valley Days. Bond also scripted for numerous television anthology programs, such as Lux Video Theatre, Studio One, General Motors Theatre and Tales of Tomorrow. "Mr. Mergenthwirker's Lobblies" was adapted to radio at least a half-dozen times and also ran as a 1938 radio series. After Bond scripted the story as a teleplay, it became the first full-length play presented on network television. It was televised three times - on Broadway Previews (1946), The Philco Television Playhouse (1949) and the Kraft Television Theatre (1953). For Locus Bond described his experiences in radio and TV:

I began writing for radio after they started adapting some of my stories. I thought, "Well, hell, I can do better than that," and I started adapting them myself. After a while, a couple of series opened up, and they asked me to become the writer. I wrote 52 weeks of Hot Copy and about 26 weeks of The Sheriff show, a comedy Western. Then television came along. I had just written Mr. Mergenthwirker's Lobblies as a radio series, and I adapted it for television. It became the first television play ever aired on a network. The network, however, consisted of Boston, New York and Washington. (This was 1946.) The presentation was so elaborate, there was a studio audience, and they printed a program for it. Unfortunately, no copy of the show exists, because they didn't have tape in those days. All they had was kinescope, flickering black and white movie stuff. That was probably the golden opportunity of my life that I threw out the window. After the play was done, the director said, "This is a brand-new medium. Why don't you come up here and get into it with us?" They couldn't pay me very much, and I said, "I'm making more than that in radio right now," so I turned it down... But I wrote about 15 or 20 television plays, some of them adaptations of my own things, others original. State of Mind was a fantasy about a man who got pissed off at modern civilization. He said, "I'm gonna secede from the Union." So he did. I thought it was a helluva good idea! (Still a cute play, but it's not produced anymore.) I adapted my second Mergenthwirker/Lobblies story as a television play, and then there was a third one.

== Other writing ==
Bond worked in public relations before and after his writing career, opening his own agency in 1959. He later became a noted antiquarian bookseller. Bond retired from writing in the late 1950s. After encouragement from fans and professionals, notably Harlan Ellison, he published a new story in 1995.

Bond had an extensive correspondence with James Branch Cabell and after Cabell's death was his literary executor for a while.

In 1998 the Science Fiction and Fantasy Writers of America made Bond an Author Emeritus. In 2002 Bond donated his personal papers to the Marshall University library, which created a replica of his home office. Bond died of complications from heart problems on November 4, 2006.

Nelson and Betty Bond had two sons, Kit and Lynn. Betty Bond had her own career in Virginia television, interviewing local notables for her Betty Bond Show on Roanoke's WSLS-TV. Bond died in Las Vegas, Nevada, while visiting his son.

== Bibliography ==
=== Novels ===
- Exiles of Time (Prime Press, 1949)
- That Worlds May Live (Wildside, 2003)

=== Short story collections ===
- The Scientific Pioneer (Ziff-Davis Publishing Company, 1940)
- The Return of Lancelot Biggs (Ziff-Davis Publishing Company, 1942)
- Mr. Biggs Goes to Town (Ziff-Davis Publishing Company, 1942)
- Horsesense Hank Does His Bit (Ziff-Davis Publishing Company, 1942)
- Mr. Mergenthwirker's Lobblies and Other Fantastic Tales (Coward-McCann, 1946)
- The Thirty-First of February (Gnome Press, 1949)
- The Remarkable Exploits of Lancelot Biggs, Spaceman (Doubleday, 1950)
- No Time Like the Future (Avon, 1954)
- Nightmares and Daydreams (Arkham House, 1968)
- The Far Side of Nowhere (Arkham House, 2002)
- Other Worlds Than Ours (Arkham House, 2005)

=== Nonfiction ===
- The Postal Stationery of Canada: A Reference Catalog (Herman Herst, 1953)
- James Branch Cabell: A Complete Checklist (1974)
