= 31st Street =

31st Street may refer to:

- 31st Street (Manhattan), New York City
- 31st Street Bridge, Pittsburgh, Pennsylvania
- 31st Street station, a closed rapid transit station on the Chicago 'L'
