= 31st Tactical Reconnaissance Squadron =

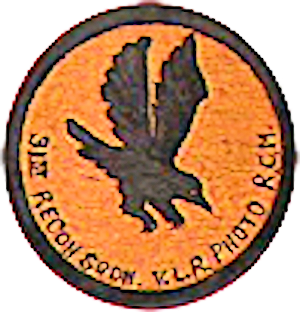
- 31st Reconnaissance Squadron – Emblem. This emblem was approved for the 9th Reconnaissance Squadron in 1946 and continued to be used by the 31st Reconnaissance Squadron when it replaced the 9th at Yokota Air Base in 1947, but was not an approved emblem for the 31st.
- Active: 15 January 1941 – 8 October 1948
- Disbanded: 8 October 1948
- Country: United States
- Branch: United States Air Force
- Role: Reconnaissance
- Engagements: World War II

Aircraft flown
- Reconnaissance: O-49 Vigilant; O-52 Owl; L-3 Grasshopper; P-40 Warhawk; P-39 Airacobra; North American O-47; L-4 Grasshopper; L-5 Sentinel; L-6 Grasshopper; A-20/RDB-7 Havoc (North American O-47, O-52 Owl, and L-5 Sentinel); P-40 Warhawk; F-6 Mustang

The 31st Tactical Reconnaissance Squadron is an inactive United States Air Force unit. It was last assigned to XIX Tactical Air Command at Brooks Field, Texas, where it was inactivated on 3 February 1946.

== History ==
The squadron was first activated at March Field, California in 1941 as the 31st Army Reconnaissance Squadron, flying light observation planes. After the Attack on Pearl Harbor, the squadron flew antisubmarine patrols over the Pacific coast in 1942. It was moved to the Southeastern United States in late 1942.

The squadron was primarily used for observation during Army training maneuvers near Fort Polk, Louisiana and Fort Benning, Georgia. The unit deployed to the European Theater of Operations on 22 April 1945. It flew battlefield reconnaissance in the Low Countries and during the Allied invasion of Germany in the spring of 1945, supporting Ninth Army.

The squadron returned to the United States in August 1945, was never fully manned or equipped. It was inactivated in February 1946.

=== Lineage ===
- Constituted as the 31st Army Reconnaissance Squadron on 20 November 1940

Activated on 15 January 1941
Redesignated 31st Observation Squadron on 14 August 1941
Redesignated 31st Observation Squadron (Medium) on 13 January 1942
Redesignated 31st Observation Squadron on 4 July 1942
Redesignated 31st Reconnaissance Squadron (Fighter) on 2 April 1943
Redesignated 31st Tactical Reconnaissance Squadron on 11 August 1943
Inactivated on 3 February 1946
Disbanded on 8 October 1948

=== Assignments ===
- Ninth Corps Area, 15 January 1941
- Fourth United States Army, 24 January 1941
- Fourth Air Force, 1 September 1941
- IV Air Support Command, 3 September 1941 (attached to 69th Observation Group after December 1941)
- 69th Observation Group (later 69th Reconnaissance Group, 69th Tactical Reconnaissance Group), 29 March 1942
- Ninth Air Force, 20 March 1945 (attached to 9th Tactical Reconnaissance Group (Provisional)) after 28 March 1945
- 363d Tactical Reconnaissance Group (later 363d Reconnaissance Group), 23 May 1945
- United States Strategic Air Forces in Europe, 25 June 1945
- Third Air Force, 3 August 1945 (attached to 69th Reconnaissance Group)
- XIX Tactical Air Command, 10 January 1946 – 3 February 1946 (remained attached to 69th Reconnaissance Group)

=== Stations ===
- March Field, California, 15 January 1941
- Salinas Army Air Base, California, 1 October 1941
- San Bernardino Army Air Field, California, 31 December 1941
- Ontario Army Air Field, California, 2 June 1942
- Laurel Army Air Field, Mississippi, 11 November 1942
- DeRidder Army Air Base, Louisiana, 9 April 1943
- Abilene Army Air Field, Texas, 10 September 1943
- Esler Field, Louisiana, 13 November 1943
- Key Field, Mississippi, 25 January 1945 – 26 February 1945
- Maastricht Airfield (Y-44), Holland, c. 22 March 1945
- Wiesbaden Airfield (Later AAF Station Wiesbaden), Germany, 19 April 1945 – July 1945
- Drew Field, Florida, 3 August 1945
- MacDill Field, Florida, 21 December 1945
- Brooks Field, Texas, 10 January 1946 – 3 February 1946

=== Aircraft ===
- O-49 Vigilant, 1941–1942
- O-52 Owl, 1942
- L-3 Grasshopper, 1942
- P-40 Warhawk, 1943
- P-39 Airacobra, 1943–1944
- Included North American O-47, L-4 Grasshopper, L-5 Sentinel, and L-6 Grasshopper during period 1942–1943
- A-20/RDB-7 Havoc, North American O-47, O-52 Owl, and L-5 Sentinel during 1943
- P-40 Warhawk, 1944–1945
- F-6 Mustang, 1945
