= William Cranch Bond =

American astronomer (1789–1859)

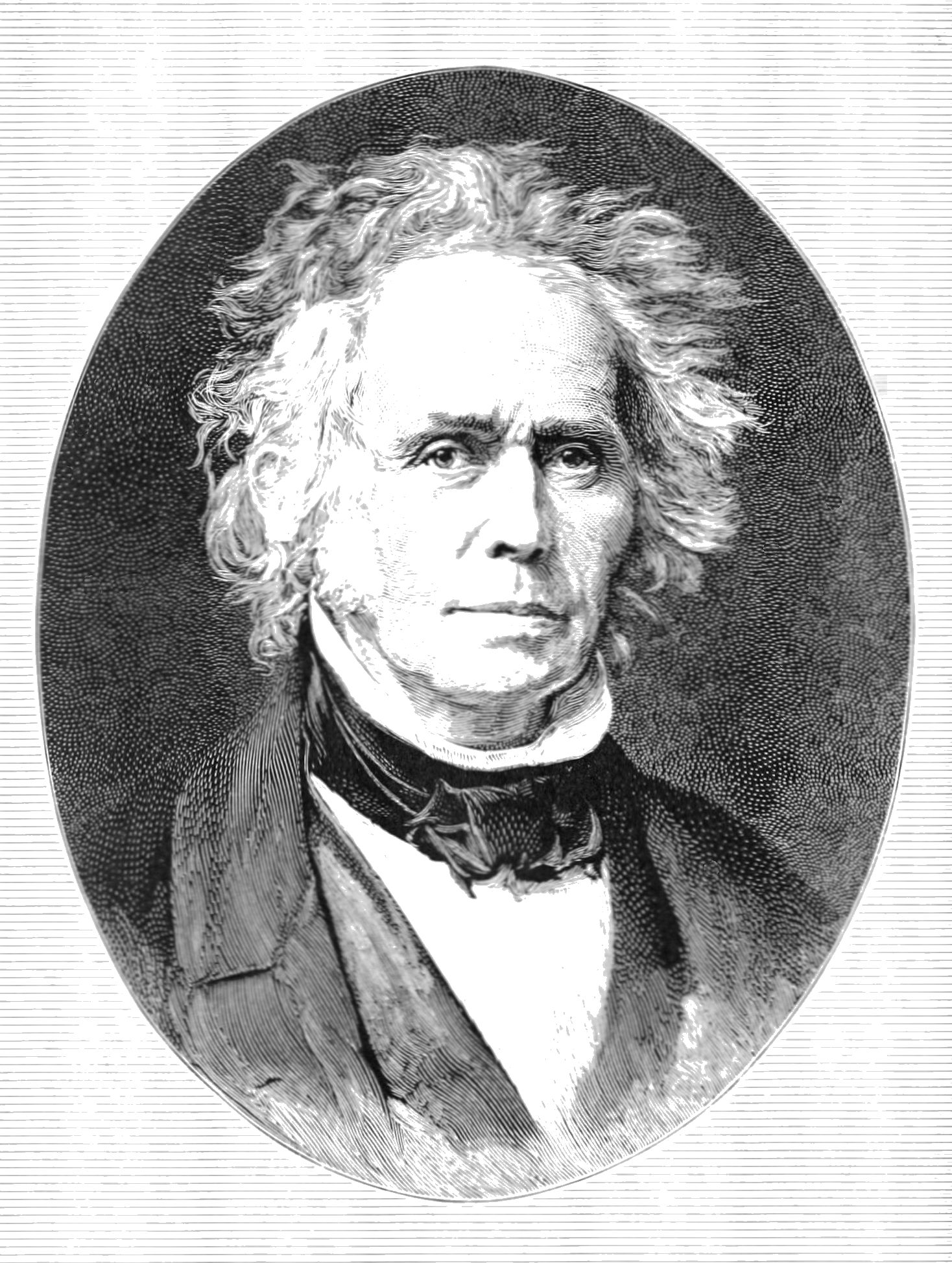
- William Cranch Bond
- Born: September 9, 1789; Falmouth, Maine, U.S.
- Died: January 29, 1859 (aged 69); Cambridge, Massachusetts, U.S.
- Known for: Hyperion
- Scientific career
- Fields: Astronomy
- Workplaces: Harvard College Observatory

William Cranch Bond (September 9, 1789 – January 29, 1859) was an American astronomer, and the first director of Harvard College Observatory.

== Upbringing ==
William Cranch Bond was born in Falmouth, Maine (north of Portland) on September 9, 1789. When he was young, his father, William Bond, established himself as a clockmaker after a failed business venture; trained by his father and aided by his penchant for engineering, W. C. Bond built his first clock when he was fifteen years old. He eventually took over his father’s business, becoming an expert clockmaker himself. The William Bond clock shop remained in existence at 9 Park Street in Boston until the 1970s..

== Amateur astronomer ==
When he was seventeen years old, Bond saw the solar eclipse of June 16, 1806. Soon thereafter, he became an avid amateur astronomer. When he built his first house, Bond made its parlor an observatory, complete with an opening in the ceiling out of which his telescope could view the sky.

== Trip to Europe ==
In 1815, Bond traveled to Europe, commissioned by Harvard University to gather information on European observatories. On July 18, 1819, at Kingsbridge in Devon, England, Bond married his first cousin, Selina Cranch, who bore him four sons and two daughters. After Selina's death in 1831, Bond married her older sister, Mary Roope Cranch. He was elected a Fellow of the American Academy of Arts and Sciences in 1832.

== Harvard Observatory ==
In 1839, Bond was allowed to move his personal astronomical equipment to Harvard and serve as its (unpaid) "Astronomical Observer to the University." Later, in 1843, a Sun-grazing comet aroused enough public interest in astronomy that Harvard was able to raise $25,730 towards the construction of a state-of-the-art observatory. Bond designed the building and the observing chair (both of which are still in working order today), and Harvard bought a fifteen-inch German-built refracting telescope, equal in size to the largest in the world at the time from Merz & Maler, a Munich based company. The telescope was first put to use on June 24, 1847, when it was pointed at the Moon.

In 1852, Bond was elected as a member to the American Philosophical Society.

== Discoveries ==
- Independently discovered the Great Comet of 1811
- Bond and his son George Phillips Bond discovered Saturn's moon Hyperion; it was independently co-discovered at the same time by William Lassell in Britain, and both are given credit.
- Father and son were the first to observe the then innermost ring of Saturn, termed the Crepe ring, when they pointed Harvard’s telescope towards Saturn in 1850.
- Working with John Adams Whipple, the Bonds pioneered astrophotography, taking the first daguerreotype image of a star (Vega, in 1850) ever taken from America. In all, the three took between 200 and 300 photos of celestial objects.

== Legacy ==
A number of celestial objects have been named in Bond's honor. A few of them include:

- The crater W. Bond on the Moon is named after him.
- A region on Hyperion is called the "Bond-Lassell Dorsum"
- Asteroid (767) Bondia is jointly named after him and his son.
- The Bond Gap within Saturn's C Ring is jointly named after him and his son.
