= 31st Infantry Battalion (Estonia) =

Infantry battalion of Estonia

31st Infantry Battalion is an Estonian Ground Force rapid reaction unit, which is based on the army reservists. The unit was in active readiness from 1 August 2008 until 31 July 2009.

This unit is formed on the basis of conscripts whose conscription lasted from July 2007 until May 2008. Members of it provide the Defence Resource Board with their address, place of work, phone number and e-mail and inform the latter of any changes of these data.

After one year it will be changed by other unit.

== See also ==
- 1st Infantry brigade
