= Nightmares and Daydreams =

1968 collection of stories by Nelson Bond

- Dust-jacket illustration by Ronald Clyne for Nightmares and Daydreams
- Author: Nelson Bond
- Cover artist: Ronald Clyne
- Language: English
- Genre: Fantasy, horror, science fiction
- Publisher: Arkham House
- Publication date: 1968
- Publication place: United States
- Media type: Print (hardback)
- Pages: 269 pp

Nightmares and Daydreams is a collection of stories by author Nelson Bond. It was released in 1968 by Arkham House in an edition of 2,040 copies. It was the author's first book to be published by Arkham House. Most of the stories had previously appeared in the magazine Blue Book.

== Contents ==
Nightmares and Daydreams contains the following tales:

1. "To People a New World"
2. "A Rosy Future for Roderick"
3. "The Song"
4. "Petersen's Eye"
5. "The Abduction of Abner Greer"
6. "Bird of Prey"
7. "The Spinsters"
8. "The Devil to Pay"
9. "'Down Will Come the Sky'"
10. "The Pet Shop"
11. "Al Haddon's Lamp"
12. "Last Inning"
13. "The Dark Door"
14. "Much Ado About Pending"
15. "Final Report"
