= The Remarkable Exploits of Lancelot Biggs, Spaceman =

- first edition cover
- Author: Nelson Bond
- Language: English
- Genre: Science fiction
- Publisher: Doubleday Books
- Publication date: 1950
- Publication place: United States
- Media type: Print (hardback & paperback)
- Pages: 224

The Remarkable Adventures of Lancelot Biggs, Spaceman (sometimes referred to as Lancelot Biggs: Spaceman) is a collection of humorous science fiction stories by Nelson Bond, published by Doubleday Books in 1950. It comprises eleven of the fourteen stories in Bond's "Lancelot Biggs" series. Sometimes described as a novel, it presents the stories in a sequence of twenty-seven numbered chapters. The collection was reissued in trade paperback by Wildside Press many years later; no mass market paperback edition was issued.

== Contents, in order of their appearance in the collection ==
- "F.O.B. Venus" (Fantastic Adventures 11/1939)
- "Lancelot Biggs Cooks a Pirate" (Fantastic Adventures 02/1940)
- "The Madness of Lancelot Biggs" (Fantastic Adventures 04/1940)
- "Lancelot Biggs, Master Navigator" (Fantastic Adventures 05/1940)
- "Where Are You, Mr. Biggs?" (Weird Tales 09/1941)
- "The Ghost of Lancelot Biggs" (Weird Tales 01/1942)
- "Honeymoon in Bedlam" (Weird Tales 01/1941)
- "The Love Song of Lancelot Biggs" (Amazing 09/1942)
- "Mr. Biggs Goes to Town" (Amazing 10/1942)
- "The Ordeal of Lancelot Biggs" (Amazing 05/1943)
- "The Downfall of Lancelot Biggs" (Weird Tales 03/1941)

Not included in the book were:

- "The Genius of Lancelot Biggs" (Fantastic Adventures 06/1940)
- "The Scientific Pioneer Returns" (Amazing 11/1940)
- "The Return of Lancelot Biggs" (Amazing 05/1942)

The eleven Lancelot Biggs stories included were revised for this volume to provide continuity from one episode to the next. The Index to Science Fiction Anthologies and Collections incorrectly lists "The Scientific Pioneer Returns" as one of the volume's included stories.

== Reception ==
Time magazine reviewed the book under the headline "Space Ahoy!"—reporting it as "chiefly notable as a publisher's trailblazer," a step by a mainstream trade-book company into the science fiction genre, one of a half-dozen such books Doubleday had published that year. Its reviewer commented that "Author Nelson Bond, who used to write westerns, has merely put a Space Age icing on the old Wild West conventions" and that "to those who have never exposed themselves to the comic strips, the pseudo-scientific gobbledygook that spews forth from every page of Lancelot Biggs: Spaceman may cause some confusion for a while [although] [t]he persistent will get the hang of it." In Astounding Science Fiction magazine, P. Schuyler Miller gave the collection a somewhat mixed review, saying that "Bond lacks few of the tricks of the born storyteller, and uses them all blandly and shamelessly."
