= Timaeus (crater) =

Crater on the Moon

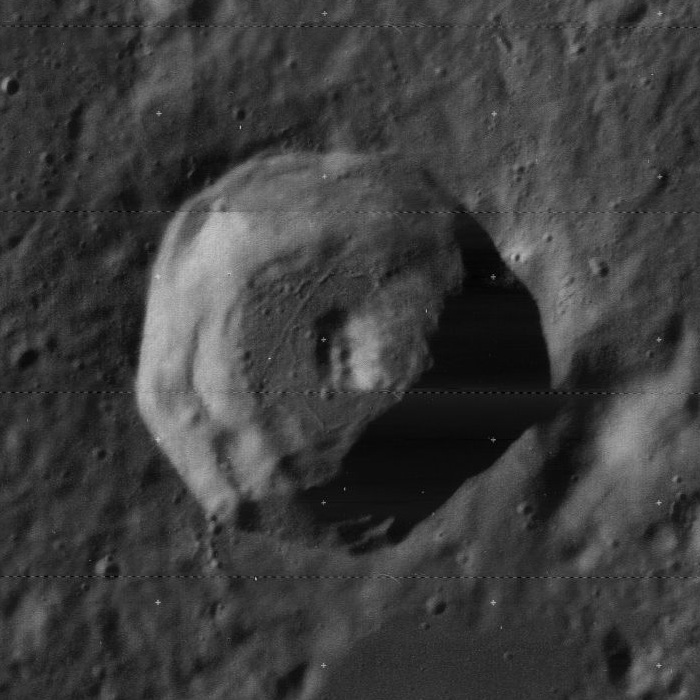
- Lunar Orbiter 4 image
- Coordinates: 62.8°N 0.4°W
- Diameter: 33 km
- Depth: 2.65 km (1.65 mi)
- Colongitude: 0° at sunrise
- Formation: Upper Imbrian
- Eponym: Timaeus

Timaeus is a lunar impact crater in the northern part of the Moon, on the north edge of Mare Frigoris. It forms part of the southwestern wall of the large and irregular walled plain called W. Bond.

On the lunar geologic timescale, Timaeus is a crater of Upper (Late) Imbrian age. The rim of Timaeus is somewhat pentagonal in shape, with rounded corners. There is a central rise in the midpoint of the crater floor. The irregular terrain to the west of Timaeus displays a degree of streaky parallelism, as was noted by the Rev. T. W. Webb. These follow a path slightly to the east of north.
