= 31st Reserve Field Artillery Regiment (Ireland) =

- Shoulder Flash of the 31st Field Artillery Regiment
- Active: 2005–2013
- Country: Ireland
- Branch: Army
- Type: Artillery
- Garrison/HQ: HQ at Templemore

The 31st Reserve Field Artillery Regiment was a field artillery unit of the Southern Brigade Irish Reserve Defence Forces tasked with the defence of part of County Tipperary and also with providing support to the 1st FAR, a unit of the Irish Army.

== History ==
The Corps of Artillery of the Irish Army was founded in 1924, and based in Connolly Barracks in the Curragh Camp. The Patron saint of the corps is Saint Barbara, and she appears on the corps insignia sitting astride a cannon. The 31st FAR came into being on 1 October 2005, and was made up of units from the former reserve structure, the FCÁ. The units which were disbanded in order to form the new 31st FAR were the 8th FAR (Cork), 3rd FAR (Tipperary) and part of the 14th Infantry Battalion also from Tipperary.

The 8th FAR was originally formed in Ballincollig in 1979. It was made up of the reserve batteries which had once formed part of the 1st FAR. The regiment consisted of two batteries: 2nd Battery (25 Pounder field guns) and 21st Heavy Mortar Battery (120 mm Mortars). The unit moved to Collins Barracks in Cork City following the closure of Ballincollig Barracks. 2nd Battery and 21st Battery merged to become 1st Battery of the 31st FAR on 1 October 2005.

== Activities ==
The unit had both ceremonial and training commitments, with annual artillery practice held in the Glen of Imaal in County Wicklow in July of each year. A camp was also held around Easter time which focused on small arms training. Reservists from this unit were often invited to participate in training courses outside the unit, and members also participated in Defence Forces sporting events and shooting competitions, and have won several medals across a variety of events.

The Pistol Team from 1st Battery was in the forefront of army shooting competitions for some years. In January 2005, members of the 8th FAR (later the 1st Battery) were called upon to take part in a ceremonial 21-gun salute in honour of the City of Cork becoming the European Capital of Culture. Other ceremonial duties have included committing a contingent of reservists to represent the 1st Southern Brigade at the National Day of Remembrance ceremony at Kilmainham. Reservists in the 31st FAR were also trained in Infantry Tactics, Amphibious operations, Fighting in Built Up Areas (FIBUA) and Peace Support Operations.

== Armaments ==
The unit used 25 Pounder field guns and L118 and L119 105 mm Light guns. Some smooth-bore Brandt 120 mm heavy mortars were in the unit's possession but this obsolete weapon was later removed from service, while the 25 pounder became an exclusively ceremonial weapon. The unit acquired a number of 120 mm Ruag mortars.

The personal weapon of reservists in this unit was the Steyr AUG automatic rifle. Officers and senior NCOs carried the 9 mm H&K USP pistol, which had replaced the Browning Hi-Power in 2007. The 7.62 mm FN MAG machine gun replaced the Bren gun as the section light machine gun.

The unit also trained on anti-tank weapons such as the 84 mm Carl Gustav recoilless rifle and the 84 mm SRAAW.

== Members ==
Men and women ages 17–34 could join the unit by applying to their local battery office. The unit had batteries in Cork City and in Templemore, Thurles and Nenagh. All members were volunteers, and they give up their free time in order to train with the unit. 2007 was the first year since 1979 where members of the Reserve Defence Forces could become integrated with their associated army unit. Members of the 31 FAR had the opportunity to train alongside their colleagues in the 1st FAR.

As an artillery unit, members also trained frequently with the Army School of Artillery in the Curragh Camp. Training was held once a week for two hours at night. Members were also frequently given opportunity to train on a variety of Reserve Army tasks across the 1st Southern Brigade.

== Barracks ==
- HQ Bty – McCann Barracks, Templemore, Co. Tipperary
- 1 Gun Bty – Collins Barracks, Cork
- 2 Gun Bty – Slievenamon Road, Thurles, Co. Tipperary
- 3 Gun Bty – Military Barracks, Summerhill, Nenagh, Co. Tipperary
