= The Thirty-First of February =

1949 collection of fantasy stories by Nelson Bond

- Dust-jacket from the first edition
- Author: Nelson Bond
- Cover artist: James Gibson
- Language: English
- Genre: Fantasy
- Publisher: Gnome Press
- Publication date: 1949
- Publication place: United States
- Media type: Print (hardback)
- Pages: 272

The Thirty-First of February is a collection of fantasy stories by American writer Nelson Bond. It was released in 1949 by Gnome Press in an edition of 5,000 copies. Most of the stories had previously appeared in the magazines Blue Book, Unknown, Fantastic Adventures, Esquire and Amazing Stories.

== Contents ==
- Introduction, by James Branch Cabell
- "The Sportsman"
- "The Mask of Medusa"
- "My Nephew Norvell"
- "The Ring"
- "The Gripes of Wraith"
- "The Cunning of the Beast"
- "The Five Lives of Robert Jordan"
- "Take My Drum to England—"
- "Saint Mulligan"
- "The Monster from Nowhere"
- "The Man Who Walked Through Glass"
- "The Enchanted Pencil"
- "Pilgrimage"

== Reception ==
Astounding reviewer Forrest J Ackerman punningly praised the collection as "first-class funtasy, leavened with a soupcon of sobriety."

== Sources ==
- Chalker, Jack L.; Mark Owings (1998). The Science-Fantasy Publishers: A Bibliographic History, 1923-1998. Westminster, MD and Baltimore: Mirage Press, Ltd. p. 298.
- Contento, William G. "Index to Science Fiction Anthologies and Collections".
