= 31st Battalion =

31st Battalion may refer to:

- 31st Battalion, Royal Queensland Regiment, a unit of the Australian Army
- 31st/42nd Battalion, Royal Queensland Regiment, a unit of the Australian Army
- 2/31st Battalion (Australia), a unit of the Australian Army that was raised during World War II
- 31st (Alberta) Battalion, CEF, a unit of the Canadian Army
- 31st Infantry Battalion (Estonia), a unit of the Estonian Army
- 31st Engineer Battalion, a unit of the United States Army
- Combat Logistics Battalion 31, a unit of the United States Marine Corps

== See also ==
- 31st Division (disambiguation)
- 31st Group (disambiguation)
- 31st Brigade (disambiguation)
- 31st Regiment (disambiguation)
- 31st Squadron (disambiguation)
