= 31st Division =

31st Division may refer to:

== Infantry divisions ==
- 31st Motorized Infantry Division (People's Republic of China)
- 31st Division (German Empire), Imperial German Army
- 31st Infantry Division (Wehrmacht)
- 31st SS Volunteer Grenadier Division, Germany
- 31st Ashura Division, Iran
- 31st Infantry Division "Calabria", Italian Army
- 31st Division (Imperial Japanese Army), Imperial Japanese Army
- 31st Division (Philippines)
- 31st Infantry Division (Russian Empire)
- 31st Guards Airborne Division, Soviet Union
- 31st Guards Mechanized Division, Soviet Union
- 31st Guards Motor Rifle Division, Soviet Army, earlier the 31st Guards Rifle Division
- 31st Rifle Division, Soviet Union
- 31st Division (United Kingdom), United Kingdom
- 31st Infantry Division (United States), United States Army
- 31st Division (Yugoslav Partisans)

== Armoured divisions ==
- 31st Armoured Division, British India, World War II

== Aviation divisions ==
- 31st Air Division, United States Air Force

== Artillery divisions ==
- 31st Artillery Division, People's Republic of China

== Naval divisions ==
- 31st Corvette Division, Swedish Navy
- 31st Naval Supply Ships Division, Ukraine

== See also ==
- List of military divisions by number
- 31st Army (disambiguation)
- 31st Group (disambiguation)
- XXXI Corps (disambiguation)
- 31st Brigade (disambiguation)
- 31st Regiment (disambiguation)
- 31st Battalion (disambiguation)
- 31st Squadron (disambiguation)
