= 31 Squadron =

31 Squadron or 31st Squadron may refer to:

- No. 31 Squadron IAF, Indian Air Force
- No. 31 Squadron (Finland)
- No. 31 Squadron RAAF, Royal Australian Air Force
- No. 31 Squadron RAF, United Kingdom Royal Air Force
- No. 31 Squadron RNZAF, Royal New Zealand Air Force
- 31 Squadron SAAF, South African Air Force
- 31st Squadron (Belgium), Belgian Air Force
- 31st Air Squadron, Indonesian Air Force
- 31st Training Squadron (JASDF), Japanese Air Self-Defense Force
- 31st Aero Squadron, United States Army Air Service
- 31st Airlift Squadron, United States Air Force
- 31st Combat Communications Squadron, United States Air Force
- 31st Combat Training Squadron, United States Air Force
- 31st Rescue Squadron, United States Air Force
- 31st Reconnaissance Squadron (disambiguation), several units of the United States Air Force
- 31st Tactical Training Squadron, United States Air Force
- 31st Test and Evaluation Squadron, United States Air Force
- Destroyer Squadron 31, a United States Navy destroyer squadron
- Marine Aviation Logistics Squadron 31, United States Marine Corps
- VFA-31 (Strike Fighter Squadron 31), United States Navy
- VP-31 (Patrol Squadron 31), United States Navy
- VS-31 (Sea Control Squadron 31), United States Navy
- VX-31 (Air Test and Evaluation Squadron 31), United States Navy

== See also ==
- 31st Division (disambiguation)
- 31st Group (disambiguation)
- 31st Brigade (disambiguation)
- 31st Regiment (disambiguation)
- 31st Battalion (disambiguation)
