= 31st Brigade =

31st Brigade or 31st Infantry Brigade may refer to:

== Australia ==
- 31st Brigade (Australia)

== Germany ==
- 31st Airborne Brigade (Bundeswehr)

== France ==
- 31st Brigade (France)

== Greece ==
- 31st Mechanized Infantry Brigade (Greece)

== India ==
- 31st Indian Brigade of the British Indian Army in the First World War
- 31st Indian Infantry Brigade of the British Indian Army in the Second World War

== Italy ==
- 31st Armored Brigade "Curtatone"

== Malaysia ==
- 31st Infantry Brigade (Malaysia)

== Russia ==
- 31st Guards Air Assault Brigade

== Sovet Union ==
- 31st Mechanized Brigade (Soviet Union)

== Ukraine ==
- 31st Mechanized Brigade (Ukraine)
- 31st Public Order Brigade (Ukraine)

== United Kingdom ==
- 31st Armoured Brigade (United Kingdom)
- 31st Infantry Brigade (United Kingdom)
- 31st (North Midland) Anti-Aircraft Brigade
- 31st Brigade, Royal Field Artillery

== United States ==
- 31st Air Defense Artillery Brigade (United States)
- 31st Chemical Brigade

== See also ==
- 31st Division (disambiguation)
- 31st Group (disambiguation)
- 31st Regiment (disambiguation)
- 31st Battalion (disambiguation)
- 31st Squadron (disambiguation)
