= George Phillips Bond =

American astronomer

- Born: May 20, 1825; Dorchester, Boston, MA, U.S.
- Died: February 17, 1865 (aged 39); Cambridge, MA, U.S.
- Education: Harvard University (BA, 1845) (MS, 1853)
- Known for: astrophotography
- Awards: Gold Medal of the Royal Astronomical Society (1865)
- Scientific career
- Fields: astronomy
- Workplaces: Harvard College Observatory

George Phillips Bond (May 20, 1825 – February 17, 1865) was an American astronomer. He was the son of William Cranch Bond. Some sources give his year of birth as 1826.

His early interest was in nature and birds, but after his elder brother William Cranch Bond Jr. died, he felt obliged to follow his father into the field of astronomy. He succeeded his father as director of Harvard College Observatory from 1859 until his death. His cousin was Edward Singleton Holden, first director of Lick Observatory.

Bond took the first photograph of a star in 1850 (Vega) and of a double star in 1857 (Mizar); suggested photography could be used to measure a star's magnitude; and discovered numerous comets (including C/1850 Q1) and calculated their orbits. Bond also studied Saturn and the Orion Nebula. He and his father jointly discovered Saturn's moon, Hyperion (which was also independently discovered by William Lassell). In addition to his astronomical contributions, Bond also surveyed the White Mountains of New Hampshire.

He died of tuberculosis.

== Honors ==
- Won the Gold Medal of the Royal Astronomical Society in 1865.
- Mount Bond, West Bond, and Bondcliff among the White Mountains are all named after him.
- The crater G. Bond on the Moon is named after him, as is the crater Bond on Mars.
- The Bond albedo, which is important for describing a planetary body's energy balance, is also named for him.
- A region on Hyperion is called the "Bond-Lassell Dorsum"
- Asteroid (767) Bondia is jointly named after him and his father.
- The Bond Gap within Saturn's C Ring is jointly named after him and his father.
