= 31st Regiment =

31st Regiment or 31st Infantry Regiment may refer to:

== Infantry regiments ==
- 31 Combat Engineer Regiment (The Elgins), a unit of the Canadian Army
- 31st Infantry Regiment (Thailand), a unit of the Royal Thai Army
- 31st (Huntingdonshire) Regiment of Foot, a unit of the United Kingdom Army
- 31st Infantry Regiment (United States), a unit of the United States Army

== Cavalry regiments ==
- 31st Mechanized Infantry Regiment "Asturias", a unit of the Spanish Army
- 31st Cavalry Regiment (United States), a unit of the United States Army

== Artillery regiments ==
- 31st Reserve Field Artillery Regiment (Ireland), a unit of the Irish Army

== Combat support regiments ==
- 31 (City of London) Signal Regiment, a unit of the United Kingdom Army

== American Civil War regiments ==
- 31st Illinois Volunteer Infantry Regiment
- 31st Iowa Volunteer Infantry Regiment
- 31st New York Volunteer Infantry Regiment
- 31st Infantry Regiment, United States Colored Troops
- 31st Wisconsin Volunteer Infantry Regiment

== See also ==
- 31st Division (disambiguation)
- 31st Group (disambiguation)
- 31st Brigade (disambiguation)
- 31st Battalion (disambiguation)
- 31st Squadron (disambiguation)
