= Hyperion (moon) =

Moon of Saturn

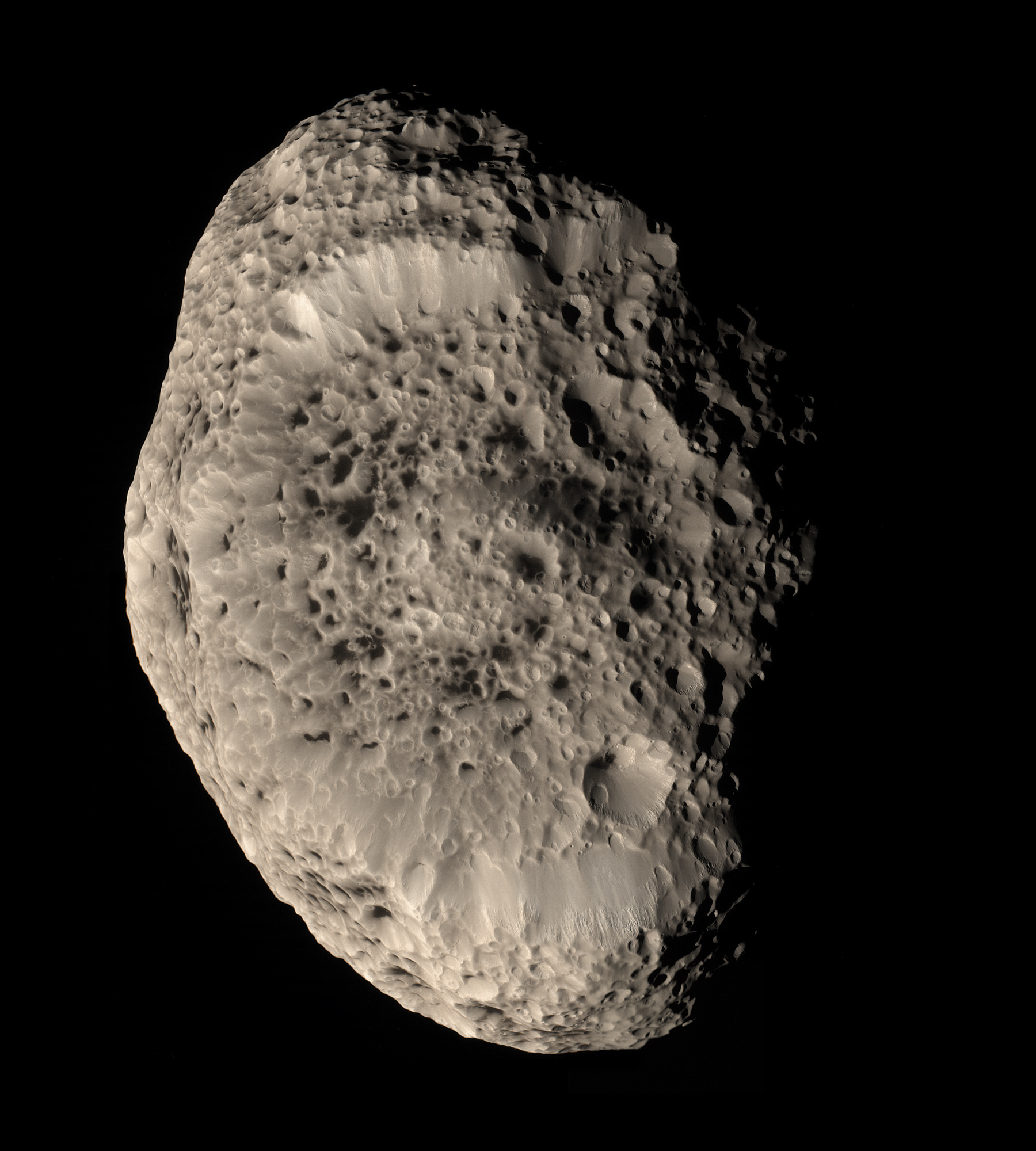
- Hyperion in approximately natural color, as photographed by the Cassini spacecraft. Bond-Lassell Dorsum arcs across much of Hyperion's surface

Discovery
- Discovered by: William Bond; George Bond; William Lassell
- Discovery date: 16 September 1848

Designations
- Designation: Saturn VII
- Pronunciation: /haɪˈpɪəriən/ (Note: From the long 'i' in Latin Hyperīon, one might expect the name to be stressed on the 'i' in English, /ˌhɪpəˈraɪən/, and indeed that pronunciation is recommended in Noah Webster (1884) A Practical Dictionary of the English Language, but recent sources universally stress the name of the 'e', as indeed do many older sources, such as Keats' poem.)
- Named after: Ὑπερίων Hyperīon
- Adjectives: Hyperionian /ˌhɪpəraɪˈoʊniən/

Orbital characteristics
- Epoch 2000 January 1.5
- Semi-major axis: 1,481,500 km (920,600 mi)
- Eccentricity: 0.105
- Orbital period (sidereal): 21.276658 d
- Inclination: 0.6° (to the Laplace plane)
- Satellite of: Saturn

Physical characteristics
- Dimensions: (361.8 × 258.0 × 204.0) ± 0.2 km
- Mean radius: 133.6±0.1 km (Note: This is the geometric mean of the 3 axes.)
- Flattening: 0.287
- Volume: 9841694±100 km^{3}
- Mass: (5.5510±0.0007)×10^{18} kg
- Mean density: 0.563±0.002 g/cm^{3}
- Surface gravity: 17.1–21.7 mm/s2 (depending on location)
- Escape velocity: 45–99 m/s (depending on location)
- Synodic rotation period: Chaotic rotation
- Axial tilt: variable
- Albedo: 0.44 ± 0.13 (geometric); 0.33 ± 0.05 (bolometric)
Surface temp.	min	mean	max
K	58 ± 2	93	115 ± 2
°C	−215 ± 2	−180	−158 ± 2
- Apparent magnitude: 14.1

Hyperion /haɪˈpɪəriən/ is the eighth-largest moon of Saturn. It is distinguished by its highly irregular shape, chaotic rotation, low density, and unusual sponge-like appearance. It was the first non-rounded moon to be discovered.

== Discovery and naming ==
Hyperion was independently discovered by William Cranch Bond and his son George Phillips Bond in the United States, and William Lassell in the United Kingdom in September 1848.

The moon is named after the Titan Hyperion, the god of watchfulness and observation, and the elder brother of Cronus (the Greek equivalent of the Roman god Saturn). It is also designated Saturn VII. The adjectival form of the name is Hyperionian.

Hyperion's discovery came shortly after John Herschel had suggested names for the seven previously known satellites of Saturn in his 1847 publication Results of Astronomical Observations made at the Cape of Good Hope. William Lassell, who saw Hyperion two days after William Bond, had already endorsed Herschel's naming scheme and suggested the name Hyperion in accordance with it. He also beat Bond to publication.

== Orbit and rotation ==
Animation of Hyperion's orbit. Saturn · Hyperion · Titan

Hyperion orbits Saturn at a distance of 1.48 million kilometers, between Titan and Iapetus. Unlike other regular moons, its orbit is moderately eccentric. It participates in a 3:4 orbital resonance with Titan; for every four orbits Titan makes, Hyperion makes 3. Conjunctions with Titan happen at the apocenter of Hyperion's orbit. The influence of Titan keeps Hyperion's orbit eccentric, preventing it from becoming more circular over time.

The Voyager 2 images and subsequent ground-based photometry indicated that Hyperion's rotation is chaotic, that is, its axis of rotation wobbles so much that its orientation in space is unpredictable. Its Lyapunov time is around 30 days. Though its rotation is predictable over short timescales, over longer timeframes it becomes impossible to predict. Hyperion, together with Pluto's moons Nix and Hydra, is among only a few moons in the Solar System known to rotate chaotically, although it is expected to be common in binary asteroids. It is also the only regular planetary natural satellite in the Solar System known to not be tidally locked.

Hyperion is unique among the large moons because of its highly irregular shape, fairly eccentric orbit, and proximity to the much larger moon Titan. These factors combine to restrict the set of conditions under which a stable rotation is possible. The 3:4 orbital resonance between Titan and Hyperion may also make a chaotic rotation more likely. The fact that its rotation is not locked probably accounts for the relative uniformity of Hyperion's surface, in contrast to many of Saturn's other moons, which have contrasting trailing and leading hemispheres.

== Physical characteristics ==
=== Shape and size ===
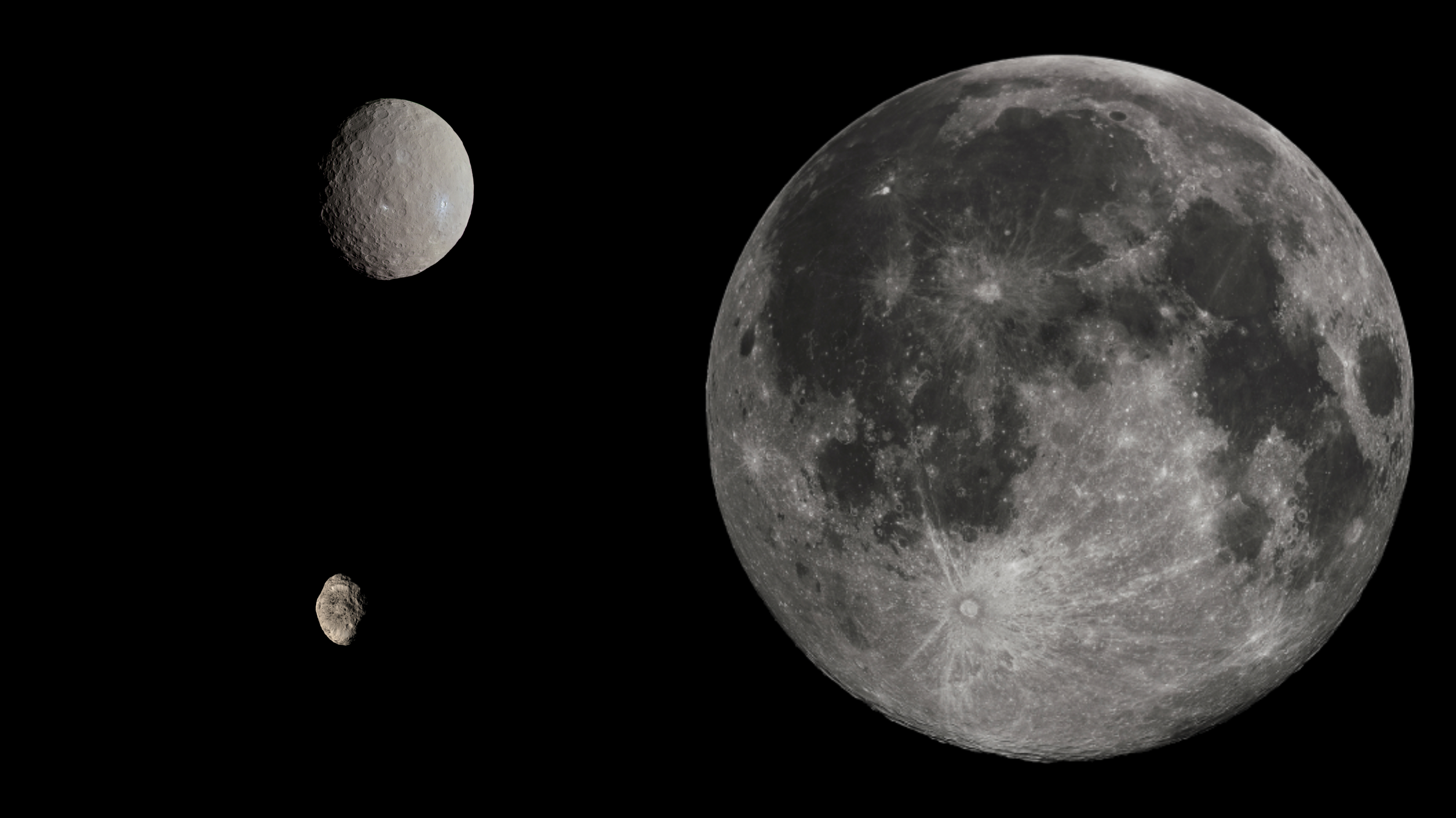
Hyperion compared to Ceres and the Moon

Hyperion is one of the largest bodies known to be highly irregularly shaped (non-ellipsoidal, and especially not in hydrostatic equilibrium) in the Solar System. (Note: There are about ten asteroids and an unknown number of irregular Trans-Neptunian objects larger than Hyperion.) The only larger planetary moons known to be irregular in shape are Neptune's moons Proteus and Nereid. Hyperion has about 15% of the mass of Mimas, the least massive known ellipsoidal body. Although Hyperion is the eighth-largest moon of Saturn, it is only the ninth-most massive. Phoebe has a smaller radius, but it is more massive than Hyperion and thus denser.

A possible explanation for the irregular shape is that Hyperion is a fragment of a larger body that was broken up by a large impact in the distant past, though this event may have been relatively young (c. 400 million years ago) compared to the age of the Solar System. A proto-Hyperion could have been 350–1,000 km (220–620 mi) in diameter (which ranges from a little below the size of Mimas to a little below the size of Tethys). Over about 1,000 years, ejecta from a presumed Hyperion breakup would have impacted Titan at low speeds, building up volatiles in the atmosphere of Titan. Other authors have suggested that Hyperion may instead have been captured by Saturn from elsewhere in the Solar System.

=== Composition and structure ===
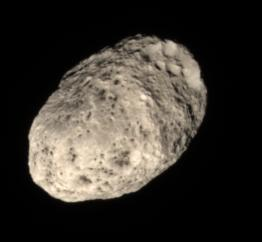
True-color image of Hyperion, taken by the Cassini spacecraft

Like most of Saturn's moons, Hyperion's low density indicates that it is composed largely of water ice with only a small amount of rock. It is thought that Hyperion may be similar to a loosely accreted "rubble pile" in its physical composition. However, unlike most of Saturn's moons, Hyperion has a low albedo (0.33), indicating that it is covered by at least a thin layer of dark material. This may be material from Phoebe (which is much darker) that got past Iapetus. Hyperion is redder than Phoebe and closely matches the color of the dark material on Iapetus.

The latest analyses of data obtained by Cassini during its flybys of Hyperion in 2005 and 2006 show that about 40 percent of it is empty space. The new analyses also confirmed that Hyperion is composed mostly of water ice with very little rock.

=== Surface features ===
Hyperion's surface is covered with deep, sharp-edged craters that give it the appearance of a giant sponge. Dark material fills the bottom of each crater. The reddish substance contains long chains of carbon and hydrogen and appears very similar to material found on other Saturnian satellites, most notably Iapetus. Scientists attribute Hyperion's unusual, sponge-like appearance to the fact that it has an unusually low density for such a large object. Its low density makes Hyperion quite porous, with a weak surface gravity. These characteristics mean impactors tend to compress the surface, rather than excavating it, and most material that is blown off the surface never returns.

The steep slopes of the craters cause mass wasting on Hyperion despite its low gravity. This can be caused by the temperature difference of the surface between day and night, as well as nearby impacts.

Hyperion has a porosity of about 0.42 ± 0.06. It was suggested in July 2007 that Hyperion's large porosity allows craters to remain nearly unchanged over the eons.

Many of its smaller craters appear to have polygon-shaped edges, rather than circular ones, which also contributes to its sponge-like appearance. This may provide information about hidden subsurface faults, as impacts may preferentially blow away material along existing fracture lines in the surface. A famous example of this happening on Earth is Meteor Crater.

Shortly after the Voyager 2 flyby, the International Astronomical Union (IAU) assigned official names to four craters and one dorsum (ridge) on Hyperion in 1982. These five remain the only named features on Hyperion. Most features since are unnamed, due to the lack of a approved coordinate system which causes difficulty in describing the absolute location of features (see below).

==== Helios crater ====
The Helios crater is about 140 km across, and has a central peak. It is at least 10 km deep, but taking into account the possible pre-impact shape of Hyperion, the crater's true excavation depth is likely about 25 km. It was given the name Helios by the IAU, but not labelled as such in their original report, causing confusion and for some authors to assume that it was unnamed. It was previously thought to be the largest impact crater on Hyperion, until the "giant crater" was identified.

Helios is comparable in size to another large crater, Herschel on Mimas. Herschel is about 145 km in diameter, often cited as being almost large enough to shatter Mimas. For comparison, Helios is similarly sized at 140 km while Hyperion is only 30% of the volume of Mimas.

==== Giant crater ====
This unnamed crater is roughly 250 × 200 km, roughly the size of Hyperion itself, and is the largest impact feature on Hyperion. It has a depth of about 35 km, and a central peak feature that is 5–7 km tall. The central "peak" is more block or dome-shaped, and is very large, about 50 × 100 km. On one side the crater's rim walls form an exaggerated ridge called the Bond-Lassel Dorsum. The ridge has a length of almost 300 km and is discontinuous in nature. The impact event creating the giant crater caused global shaking and resurfacing severe enough to erase all previous topography on Hyperion. Unlike Hyperion's other, smaller craters, whose unusual characteristics give them the appearance of holes in a sponge, the giant crater appears to be relatively normal compared to other giant craters.

The giant crater was not identified as an impact crater until 1996. Previously a study had described the general area as a "crateriform feature", but identified it as a spall face and not an impact crater. A second study also identified the Bond-Lassel Dorsum as a spallation scar. They rejected the idea of it being a part of the rim of a crater, as the crater's required diameter would have to be about the same as Hyperion's. It was suggested that adjacent to the ridge, a section of material one-quarter the area of Hyperion and 10–15 km thick had to be removed, leaving the exposed ridge behind. The removal of the material would be via spalling caused by an impact elsewhere on the moon, rather than excavation by a direct impact. Also, the giant crater's central peak landform was interpreted as a second ridge, roughly parallel to the Bond-Lassel Dorsum.

=== Coordinate system ===
Due to its chaotic and random rotation, as well as its non-spherical irregular shape, scientists have found it difficult to assign a coordinate system to Hyperion. At the time when Voyager 2 was passing through the Saturnian system, the chaotic nature of its rotation had not yet been reliably determined. Regardless, the first coordinate system was established without taking the chaotic rotation into account; indeed, it was made when information on the shape and orientation of Hyperion was not yet even available, and is entirely arbitrary. This coordinate system was used by the IAU when it approved names and assigned coordinates for the four craters and one dorsum.

Whether this coordinate system still holds official status today is ambiguous, and Hyperion has not been mentioned in an IAU report since 1990. Additionally, the origin point and the exact shape model used by the system are actually not known, which has prompted many authors to use their own coordinate systems. Some of these systems use an instantaneous rotation axis of Hyperion to define the coordinate system, while others use its shape as the basis.

=== Static charge ===
Hyperion's surface is electrically charged and was the first discovered to be so other than the Moon's surface.

== Exploration ==
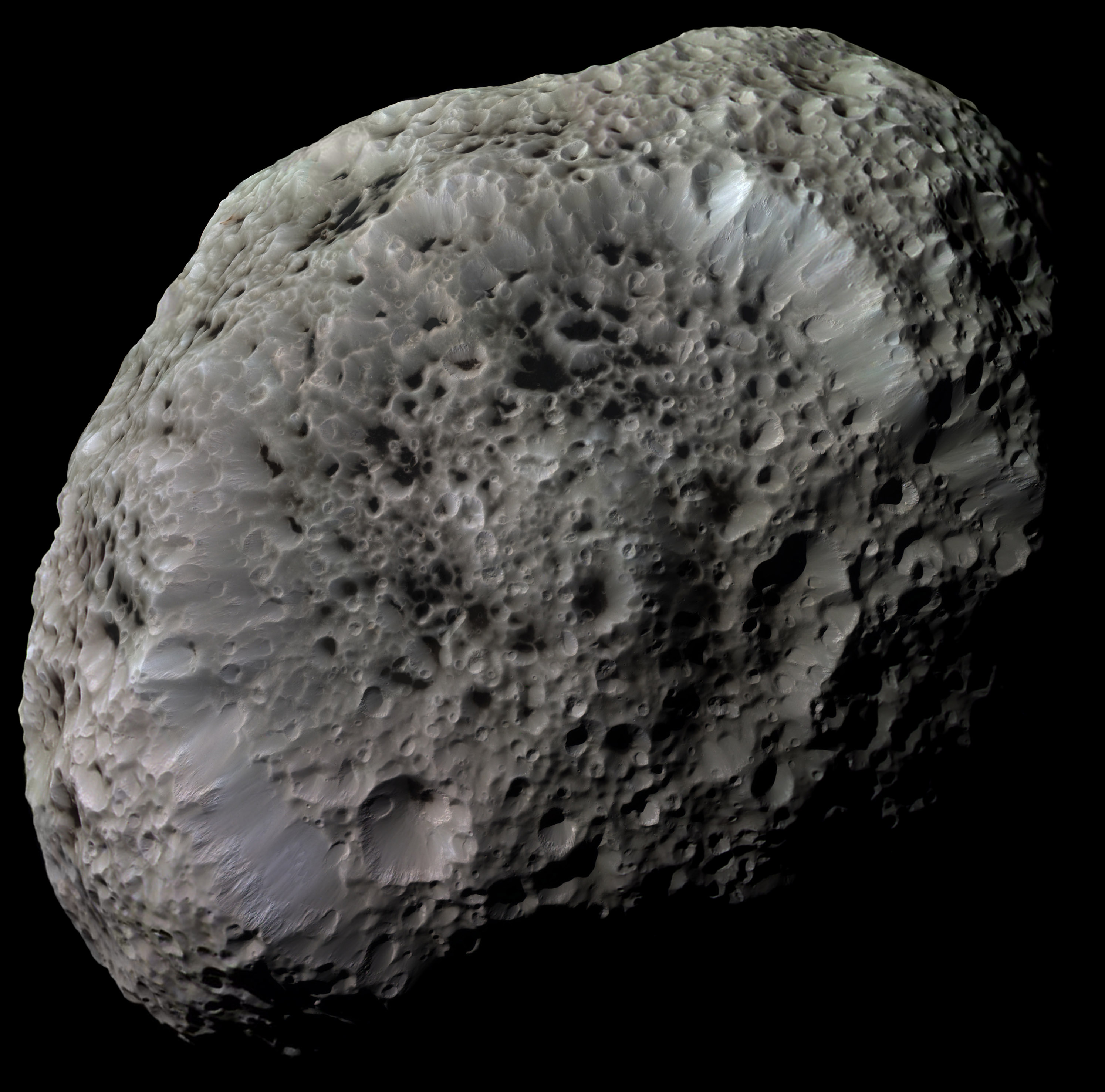
Image of Hyperion processed to bring out details. It was taken by the Cassini space probe.

Voyager 2 passed through the Saturn system, but photographed Hyperion only from a distance. It discerned individual craters and an enormous ridge, but was not able to make out the texture of Hyperion's surface. Early images from the Cassini orbiter suggested an unusual appearance, but it was not until Cassini's first targeted flyby of Hyperion on 25 September 2005 that Hyperion's oddness was revealed in full.

Hyperion has been imaged several times from moderate distances by the Cassini orbiter. The first close targeted flyby occurred at a distance of 500 km (310 mi) on 26 September 2005. Cassini made another close approach to Hyperion on 25 August 2011 when it passed 25,000 km (16,000 mi) from Hyperion, and third close approach was on 16 September 2011, with closest approach of 58,000 km (36,000 mi). Cassini's last flyby was on 31 May 2015 at a distance of about 34,000 km (21,000 mi).

== See also ==
- Chaotic rotation
- Hyperion in fiction
- Moons of Saturn
- List of geological features on Hyperion
