= Allan Chapman (historian) =

British historian of science (1946–2026)

Allan Chapman FRAS
- Born: 30 May 1946; Swinton, Lancashire, England
- Died: 21 January 2026 (aged 79)
- Citizenship: British
- Education: Lancaster University; Wadham College, Oxford
- Scientific career
- Fields: History of science
- Workplaces: Wadham College, Oxford

Allan Chapman FRAS (30 May 1946 – 21 January 2026) was a British historian of science.

== Life and career ==
Allan Chapman was born in Swinton, Lancashire, England on 30 May 1946. He grew up in the Pendlebury and Clifton districts of the then Swinton and Pendlebury borough. Having attended the local Cromwell Road Secondary Modern School for Boys, Sefton Road, Pendlebury (1957–1962), he then gained his first degree from the University of Lancaster. Subsequently, he undertook a history of science DPhil at Wadham College, Oxford. He was a historian by training and his special interests were astronomy and scientific biography.

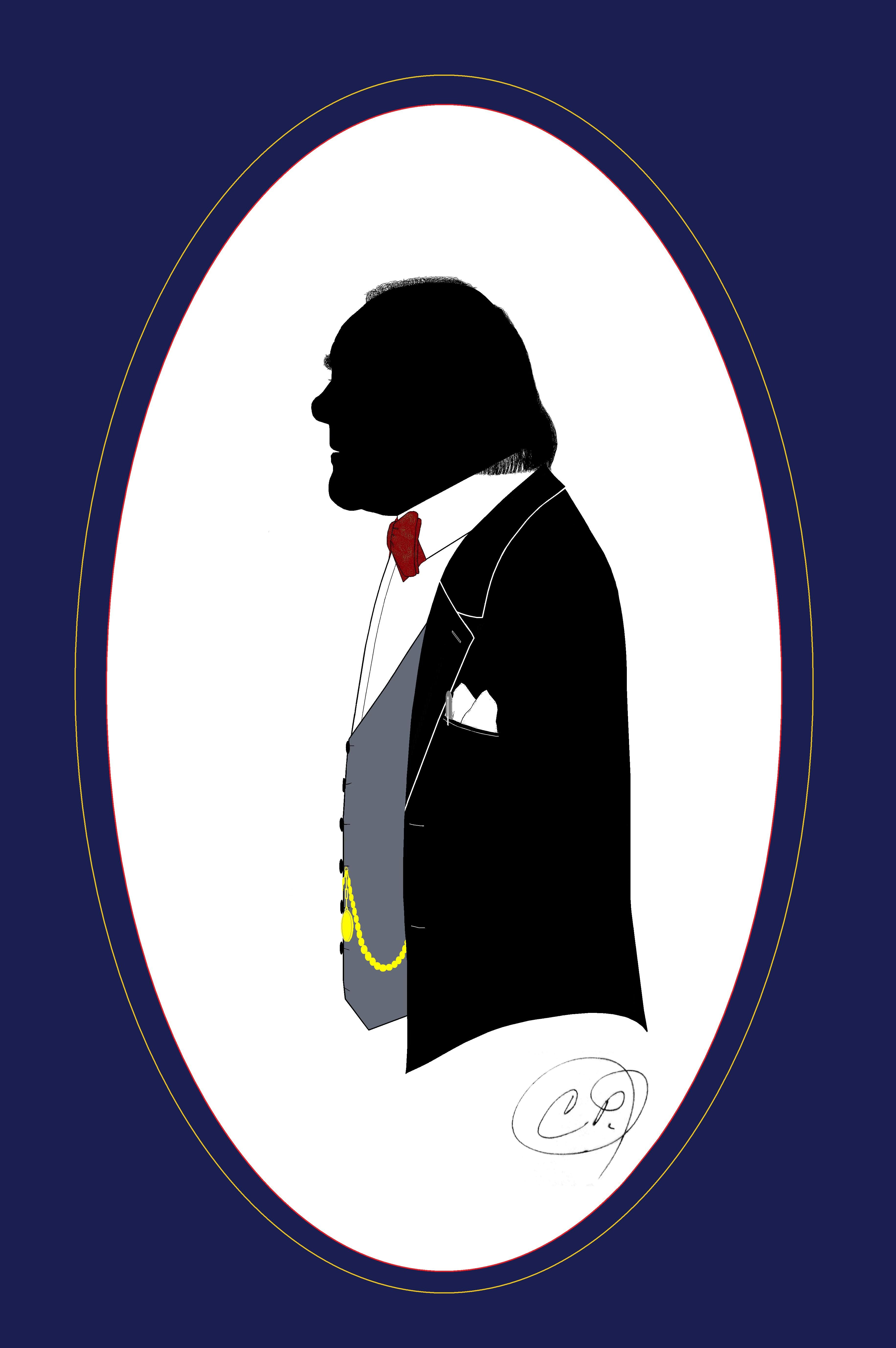
Dr. Allan Chapman 18th century style silhouette by Carlos Fuentes y Espinosa.

Chapman had been based at the University of Oxford for most of his career, as a member of the Faculty of History, based at Wadham College. He was an accomplished lecturer and public speaker (including as visiting professor at Gresham College in London). In January 1994, he delivered the Royal Society history of science Wilkins Lecture, on the subject of Edmund Halley.

He was also a television presenter, notably Gods in the Sky, covering astronomical religion in early civilisations, and Great Scientists, presenting the lives of five of the greatest thinkers. Not averse to other forms of television, he also participated in the TV quiz University Challenge – The Professionals as part of the Royal Astronomical Society team, broadcast in June–July 2006.

Chapman taught the study abroad programme of Eurospring for Minnesota State University, Moorhead, Minnesota, and Bemidji State University, Bemidji, Minnesota. This responsibility was later handed to BSU professor Pat Donnay.

He wrote many books including biographies such as England's Leonardo on Robert Hooke.

Chapman was a Fellow of the Royal Astronomical Society. He was a founder member and president of the Society for the History of Astronomy (SHA). He received an honorary doctorate from the University of Central Lancashire in 2004. He was the Honorary President and a member of Salford Astronomical Society, Honorary President of Reading Astronomical Society, Honorary President of the Mexborough & Swinton Astronomical Society, Honorary President of Orwell Astronomical Society (Ipswich) and Vice-President of the Newbury Astronomical Society. President of Preston and District Astronomical Society.

Chapman died on 21 January 2026, at the age of 79.

Asteroid (13490) Allanchapman is named in his honour.

== Selected bibliography ==
- William Crabtree 1610–1644: Manchester's First Mathematician, Allan Chapman. Manchester Statistical Society, 1996. ISBN 0-85336-132-0.
- The Victorian Amateur Astronomer: Independent Astronomical Research in Britain, 1820–1920, Allan Chapman. Praxis Publishing, Wiley-Praxis Series in Astronomy & Astrophysics, 1996. ISBN 0-471-96257-0. Second edition, Publisher, Gracewing. ISBN 978-0-8524-4544-0-100. 2017.
- Astronomical Instruments and Their Users: Tycho Brahe to William Lassell, Allan Chapman. Ashgate, Variorum Collected Studies, 1996. ISBN 0-86078-584-X.
- Patrick Moore's Millennium Yearbook: The View from AD 1001, Patrick Moore and Allan Chapman. Springer-Verlag, 1999. ISBN 1-85233-619-6.
- Gods in the Sky: Astronomy from the Ancients to the Enlightenment, Allan Chapman. Channel 4 Books, 2002. ISBN 0-7522-6164-9.
- Mary Somerville: And the World of Science, Allan Chapman. Canopus Publishing, 2004. ISBN 0-9537868-4-6.
- England's Leonardo: Robert Hooke and the Seventeenth-century Scientific Revolution, Allan Chapman. Institute of Physics Publishing, 2004. ISBN 0-7503-0987-3.
- Robert Hooke and the English Renaissance, Allan Chapman and Paul Kent (editors). Gracewing, 2005. ISBN 0-85244-587-3.
- Slaying the Dragons: Destroying Myths in the History of Science and Faith, Allan Chapman. Lion Hudson, 2013. ISBN 978-0-7459-5583-4.
- Physicians, Plagues and Progress: the History of Western Medicine from Antiquity to Antibiotics, Allan Chapman. Lion Hudson, 2016. ISBN 978-0-7459-6895-7.

== See also ==
- List of visiting Gresham professors
