= Carolyn Roberts =

British water resource mgt specialist

- Occupation: Water resource management specialist
- Title: Frank Jackson Professor of the Environment, Gresham College

Carolyn Roberts FRGS is a British water resource management specialist, and former Frank Jackson Professor of the Environment at Gresham College, London. She is a senior scientist at the University of Oxford's Knowledge Transfer Network (KTN), which links business and universities in promoting environmental technology research and innovation. Roberts is a Fellow of the Institution of Environmental Sciences, a Chartered Environmentalist and a Chartered Scientist, a Fellow of the Chartered Institution of Water and Environmental Management, and a Fellow of the Royal Geographical Society.

== Life ==
Carolyn Roberts is a British water resource management specialist, and from 2014 to 2018 was the Frank Jackson Professor of the Environment at Gresham College, London. She is a senior scientist at the University of Oxford's Environmental Sustainability Knowledge Transfer Network (KTN), which links business and universities in promoting environmental technology research and innovation. She was formerly the director of the network, and was Head of the School of Environment and co-director of the Centre for Active Learning at the University of Gloucestershire.

Roberts has co-edited four books. Her research focuses on water management issues, including how to minimise the environmental impact of development activities. She has worked on a number of cases for the police, including cases of bodies lost or found in water, and was class representative on a class action against six water companies accused of water pollution and overcharging.

Roberts is a Fellow of the Institution of Environmental Sciences, a Chartered Environmentalist and a Chartered Scientist, a Fellow of the Chartered Institution of Water and Environmental Management, and a Fellow of the Royal Geographical Society.

Since 2014 Roberts has been Chair of Society for the Environment. She is also currently Master of the Worshipful Company of Water Conservators, one of the City of London’s modern Livery Companies.
