= Lassell (lunar crater) =

Crater on the Moon

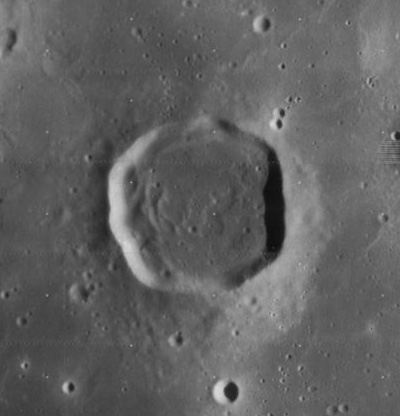
- Lunar Orbiter 4 image
- Coordinates: 15.5°S 7.9°W
- Diameter: 23 km
- Depth: 0.9 km
- Colongitude: 8° at sunrise
- Eponym: William Lassell

Lassell is a small lunar impact crater that is located in the eastern part of the Mare Nubium. It was named after British astronomer William Lassell, who discovered Uranian moons Ariel and Umbriel, among other achievements.

Lassell lies to the west of the crater Alpetragius and southwest of Alphonsus.

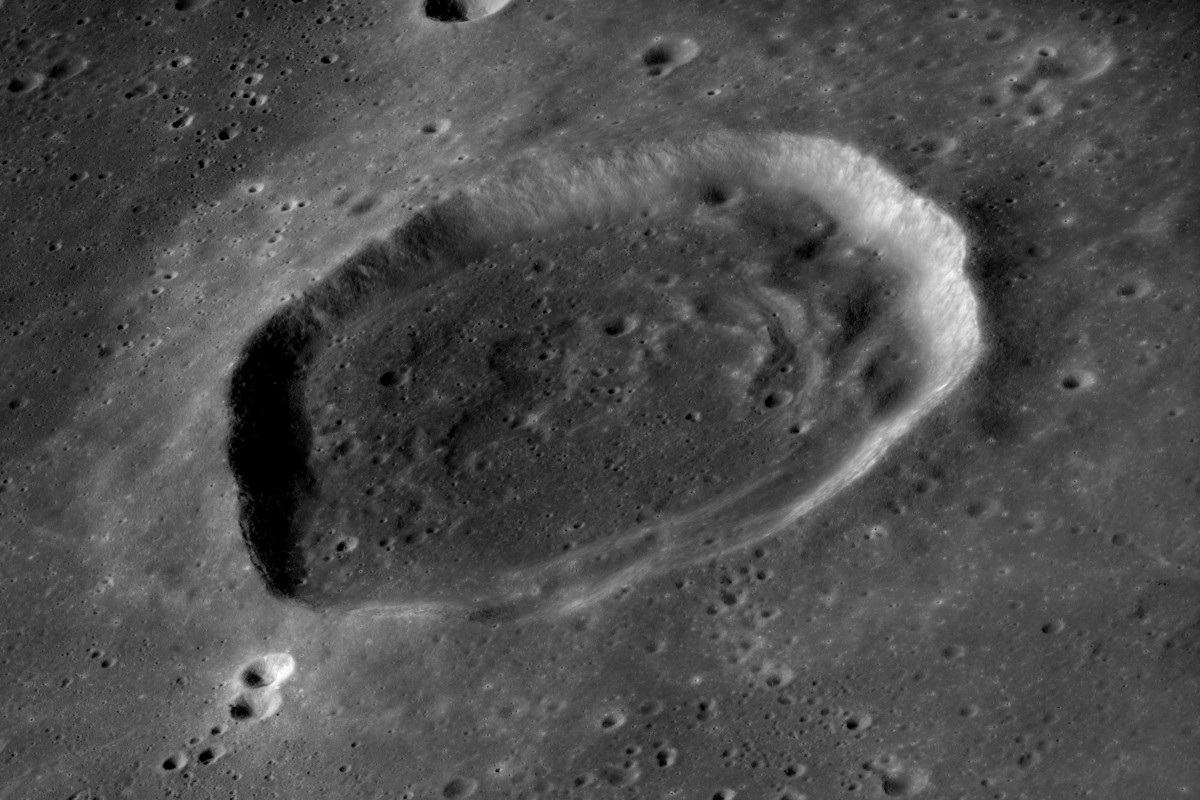
Oblique view of Lassell from Apollo 16, facing south

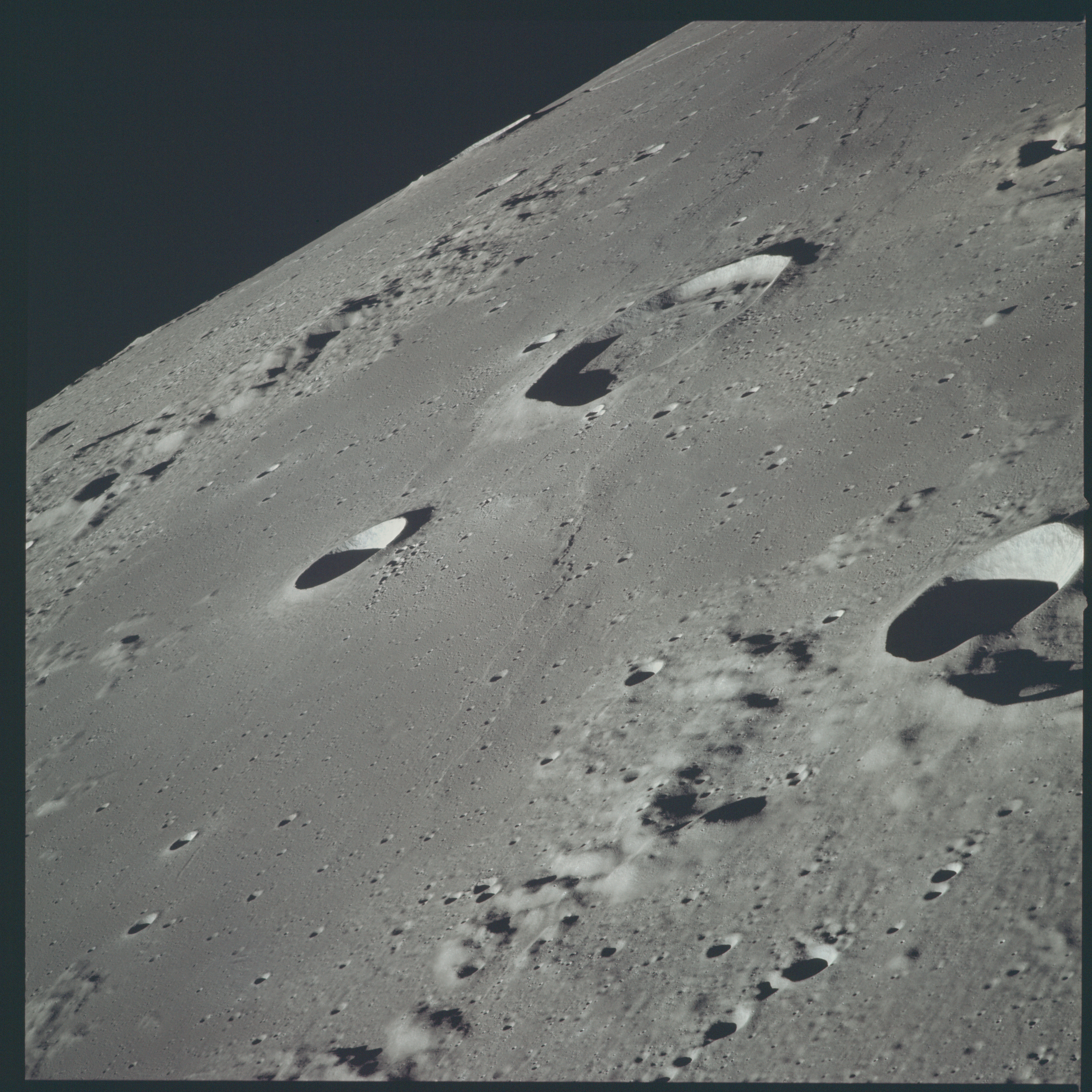
Oblique view of vicinity of Lassell from Apollo 12, with Davy in the foreground

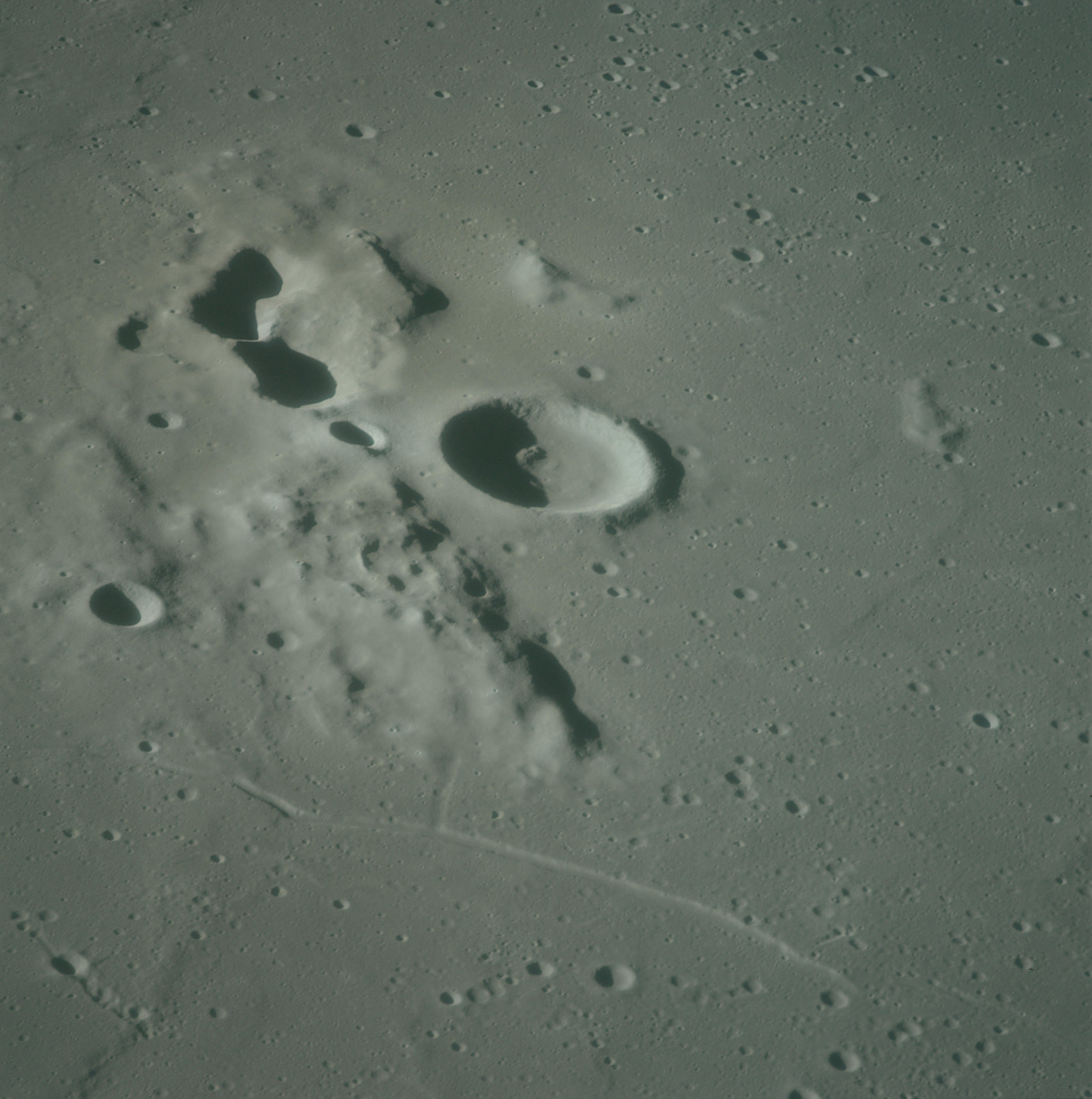
Oblique view of Lassell C (center) and the Lassell Massif (left), from Apollo 16. The irregular depressions in upper left are called Lassel G and K.

== Description ==
The interior of Lassell has been flooded and resurfaced by lava, leaving a nearly flat surface with a low remaining outer rim. The surface has a low albedo, giving the interior a dark appearance. The surviving outer wall is generally circular but with a somewhat polygonal shape.

To the east-northeast is a circular, bowl-shaped crater designated Lassell B. This formation has a higher albedo than its surroundings and so appears relatively bright, especially at high sun angles.

The tiny bowl-shaped crater Lassell D is located to the west-northwest of Lassell, about halfway to the ruined crater Guericke. This craterlet is surrounded by a patch of high-albedo surface, and is an example of a prominent lunar bright patch. The light hue is thought to be an indication of recent formation, at least in lunar geological terms.

A very dark officially unnamed craterlet, southwest of Lassell D and Lassell J, was examined during the orbital observations of Apollo 16. This dark craterlet is observable through telescopes during full moon. Both the bright crater Lassell D and the dark unnamed craterlet are also noticeable on the photographic version of chart LAC 76 (page 152) in The Clementine Atlas of the Moon.

== Lassell massif ==
To the west of Lassell, at coordinates 14.65°S, 350.96°E is a small highland area called the Lassell Massif, which has a reddish color relative to the surrounding mare.

The massif was created by series of eruptions of viscous silicic lavas starting 4.07^{+0.05}_{−0.08} billion years ago. Its surface is suspected to be partially buried by ejecta from Copernicus crater. The southern domes Lassell G and Lassell K have most silica-rich composition and feature a caldera-like depressions on tops.

== Satellite craters ==
By convention these features are identified on lunar maps by placing the letter on the side of the crater midpoint that is closest to Lassell.

Lassell	Latitude	Longitude	Diameter
A	16.8° S	6.8° W	3 km
B	16.1° S	7.7° W	4 km
C	14.7° S	9.3° W	9 km
D	14.5° S	10.5° W	2 km
E	18.2° S	10.2° W	5 km
F	17.1° S	12.5° W	5 km
G	14.8° S	9.0° W	7 km
H	14.5° S	11.2° W	5 km
J	14.8° S	10.4° W	4 km
K	15.1° S	8.9° W	4 km
M	14.2° S	8.8° W	3 km
S	18.2° S	8.5° W	4 km
T	17.1° S	8.8° W	2 km
