= Jane Caplan =

British academic and historian

Jane Caplan FRHistS
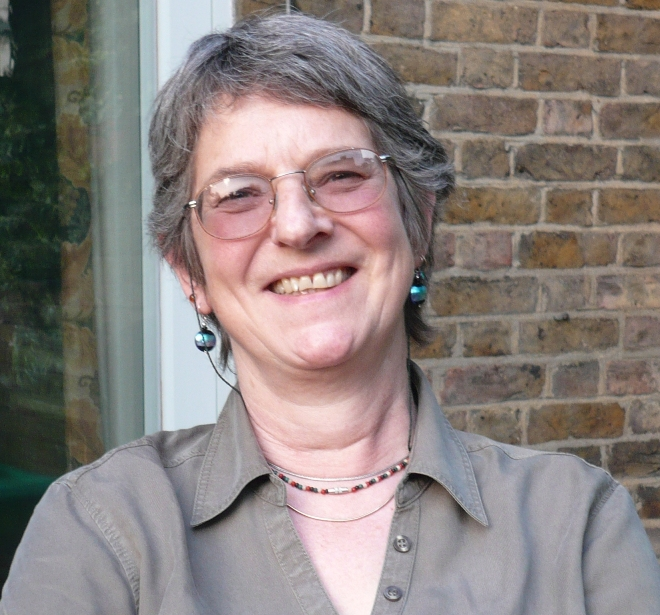
- Born: 23 March 1945 (age 81)
- Scientific career
- Fields: Nazi Germany; History of Individual Identity and Identity Documents; Women's Studies; Sexuality
- Workplaces: Somerville College, Oxford; Cambridge University; Bryn Mawr College; Columbia University; Newnham College; Birkbeck, University of London; Max Planck Institute; IdentiNet
- Academic advisors: Research Assistant to Historian Arnold J. Toynbee

Jane Caplan FRHistS (born 23 March 1945) is a British academic and historian specialising in Nazi Germany and the history of the documentation of individual identity. She is currently Visiting Professor at Birkbeck, University of London, Visiting Professor of History at Gresham College and Emeritus Fellow at St. Antony's College, University of Oxford.

== Education and career ==
Caplan received her undergraduate and postgraduate degrees from Somerville College, Oxford during the 1960s/70s. After receiving her doctorate in 1974, she taught at Cambridge University, where she worked as a research assistant to Arnold J. Toynbee. While at Cambridge, Caplan helped establish one of Britain's first courses in Women's Studies.

Caplan relocated to the United States, where she became visiting assistant professor at Columbia University in New York. She then moved to Bryn Mawr College in Pennsylvania, to become the Marjorie Walter Goodhart Professor of European History, a position she held until 2004.

In 2004 she returned to the UK to become a member of the History Department at the University of Oxford. She is currently a visiting professor at Birkbeck, University of London.

In 2011, Caplan became visiting fellow at the Max Planck Institute for the History of Science.

In addition to her position at Birkbeck, Caplan was appointed visiting professor of history for the 2013/2014 academic year at Gresham College. There she delivered a series of free public lectures in June 2014 collectively entitled "How do I know who you are? The History of Identity in Britain and Europe", following her research on individual identity.

== Academic interests ==
Caplan regards her main research field to be Nazi Germany and most of her publications have been on this period of history. She also holds an academic interest in the history of women, sexuality and the history of individual identity and identity documents. She is currently working on the administration of identification in Nazi Germany, especially civil registration.

She has been a member of many editorial boards. She is one of the founding editors of Signum – The International Society for Mark Studies and she currently sits on the advisory board for German History, H-Net German, International Labor and Working Class History and L’Homme: Zeitschrift fur feministische Geschichtswissenschaft. She has also been Editor of History Workshop Journal and sat on the editorial board for American Historical Review, German History and Journal of Modern History.

In 2008, Caplan set up IdentiNet with Dr Edward Higgs from University of Essex. The aim is 'Documenting Individual Identity: Historical and Comparative Perspectives since 1500'. IdentiNet describes themselves as a 'network of academics from four continents, working to tell the story of individual identification within a long-term, international and comparative framework'. IdentiNet was supported by an International Networks grant from the Leverhulme Trust to the University of Oxford's Faculty of History.

== Political life ==
In May 2016, Caplan was one of 300 prominent historians, including Simon Schama and Niall Ferguson, who were signatories to a letter to The Guardian, telling voters that if they chose to leave the European Union on 23 June, they would be condemning Britain to irrelevance.

== Publications ==
- A Study of History: A New Edition, Revised and Abridged with Arnold J. Toynbee (Oxford University Press, 1972). (Toynbee notes in the Foreword that "the captions to the illustrations have been drafted by Miss Caplan and approved by me" [p. 12].)

=== Nazi Germany ===
- Gabriele Herz, The Women's Camp in Moringen. A Memoir of Imprisonment in Germany 1936-1937 (New York/Oxford Berghahn Books 2006) ISBN 978-1-84545-077-9
- Nazi Germany (Oxford University Press, 2008)
- Concentration Camps in Nazi Germany. The New Histories with Nikolaus Wachsmann (Routledge, 2010)

=== History of individual identity and identity documents ===
- Written on the Body: The Tattoo in European and American History (London/Princeton: Princeton University Press, 2000)
- Documenting Individual Identity: The Development of State Practises in the Modern World with John Torepy (Princeton: Princeton University Press, 2011)
