= Gresham Professor of Information Technology =

The IT Livery Company Professor of Information Technology at Gresham College in London gives free educational lectures to the general public. The college was founded for this purpose in 1597, when it appointed seven professors; this has since increased to ten. The Gresham Professor of Information Technology is the newest professorship, having been founded in 2014 and is sponsored by the Worshipful Company of Information Technologists.

== List of Gresham Professors of Information Technology ==
	Name	Started
1.	Martyn Thomas	2014
2.	Richard Harvey	2018
3.	Victoria Baines	2022
4.	Matt Jones	2025
