= Arzachel (disambiguation) =

Arzachel was an Arabic astronomer and mathematician.

Arzachel may also refer to:

- Arzachel (crater), a lunar crater
- Arzachel (band), a pyseudonym of the 1960s band Uriel and name of their sole album
