= Martyn Thomas =

British independent consultant and software engineer

Martyn Thomas (born 1948) is a British independent consultant and software engineer.

== Biography ==
Martyn Thomas founded the software engineering company Praxis in 1983, based in Bath, southern England. He has a special interest in safety-critical systems and other high integrity applications. He has acted as an expert witness involving complex software engineering issues.

Thomas was born in Salisbury, southern England. He attended Bishop Wordsworth’s School (1959-1966). He studied biochemistry at University College London, graduating in 1969, when he started working in the field of computing. Between 1969 and 1983, he was employed at universities in London and the Netherlands, at STC working on telecommunications software, and at the South West Universities Regional Computer Centre in Bath.

In 1983, Thomas founded Praxis with David Bean, where he encouraged the use of formal methods within the company for software development. In 1986, Praxis became the first independent systems house to achieve BS 5750 (later ISO 9001) certification for all its activities. Praxis became internationally recognised as a leader in the use of rigorous software engineering, including formal methods, and grew to around 200 staff.

In December 1992, Praxis was sold to Deloitte and Touche, an international firm of accountants and management consultants, and Martyn became a Deloitte Consulting international partner whilst remaining chairman and, later, managing director of Praxis. He left Deloitte Consulting in 1997 saying that they were no longer serious about high quality software engineering. He acted as an independent consultant and expert witness in major litigations in the EU and Australia, was appointed as a non-executive director of the Serious Organisised Crime Agency and the Health and Safety Executive, and became the first Livery Company Professor of IT at Gresham College.

He is a Life Fellow and Emeritus Professor at Gresham College. He lives in Tunbridge Wells.

== Current career ==
Life Fellow, Emeritus Professor. Gresham College,
Fellow at The Royal Academy of Engineering,
Member at UK Computing Research Committee,

== Past career ==
Non-executive director of the Health and Safety Executive (HSE),
IT Livery Company Professor of Information Technology at Gresham College,
Member of Advisory Council at Foundation for Information Policy Research,
Non-executive Director of the Serious Organised Crime Agency,
Non-executive Director of the Office of the Independent Adjudicator for Higher Education,
Fellow at British Computer Society,
Chair, Executive Board at DEPLOY Project,
Member, "Sufficient Evidence" study at National Academies / CSTB,
Chair, Steering Committee at DIRC,
Member of Council at EPSRC,
Member of Advisory Group at OST Foresight programmes,
Partner at Deloitte Consulting,
Founder/Chairman/managing director at Praxis,
Chairman at Praxis Critical Systems,
Deputy Director at SWURCC,
Software Engineer at STC.

== Honors and awards ==
Commander of the Order of the British Empire, CBE,
Fellow of the Royal Academy of Engineering,
Honorary DSc (Hull),
Honorary DSc (Edinburgh),
Honorary DSc (City),
Honorary DSc (Bath), Dr of Engineering,
IEE Achievement Medal, Computing and Control,
Who's Who.
