= Vernon Bogdanor =

British political scientist (born 1943)

Sir Vernon Bogdanor CBE FRSA FBA
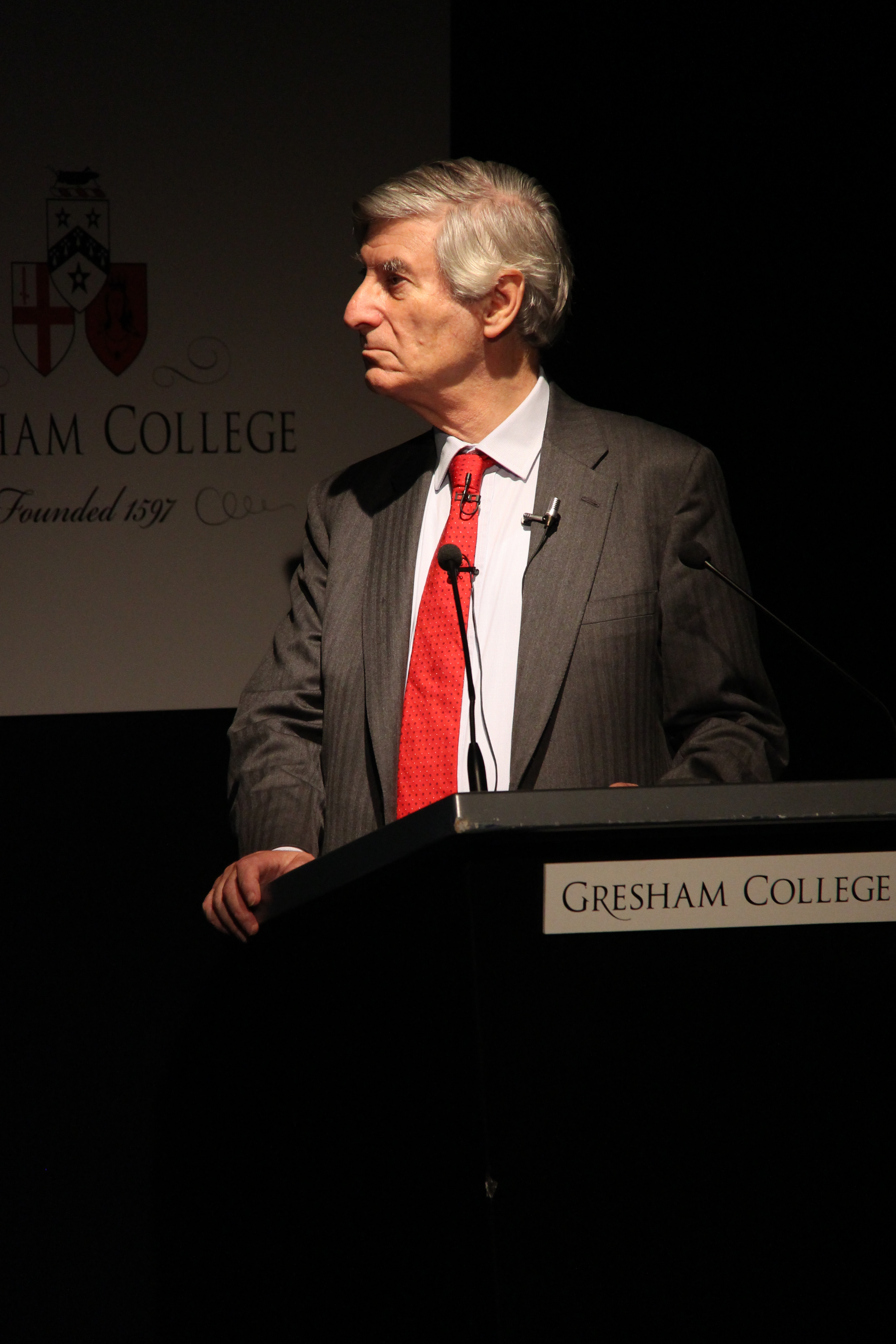
- At Gresham College, 2015
- Born: Vernon Bernard Bogdanor; 16 July 1943 (age 83); Staines, Middlesex, England
- Education: The Queen's College, Oxford
- Spouses: Judith Evelyn Beckett (m. 1972; div. 2000) Sonia Margaret Robertson (m. 2009)
- Scientific career
- Workplaces: University of Oxford; King's College London; Gresham College; New College of the Humanities
- Notable students: David Cameron

Sir Vernon Bernard Bogdanor (/ˈbɒɡdənɔːr/; born 16 July 1943) is a British political scientist, historian and research professor at the Institute for Contemporary British History at King's College London. He is also emeritus professor of government at the University of Oxford and an emeritus fellow in politics of Brasenose College, Oxford. He is one of Britain's foremost constitutional experts and has written extensively on constitutional questions and political issues more widely.

== Early life and education ==
Vernon Bernard Bogdanor was born on 16 July 1943 in Staines (then in Middlesex) to Harry and Rosa Bogdanor (née Weinger), and grew up in Uxbridge. His father was a pharmacist whose parents came to England from Ukraine, while his mother was born in Poland and came to England in the 1930s; both were observant Jews. Educated at Bishopshalt School, Bogdanor gained a first-class honours Bachelor of Arts degree in Philosophy, Politics and Economics (PPE) from The Queen's College, Oxford, in 1964.

== Career ==
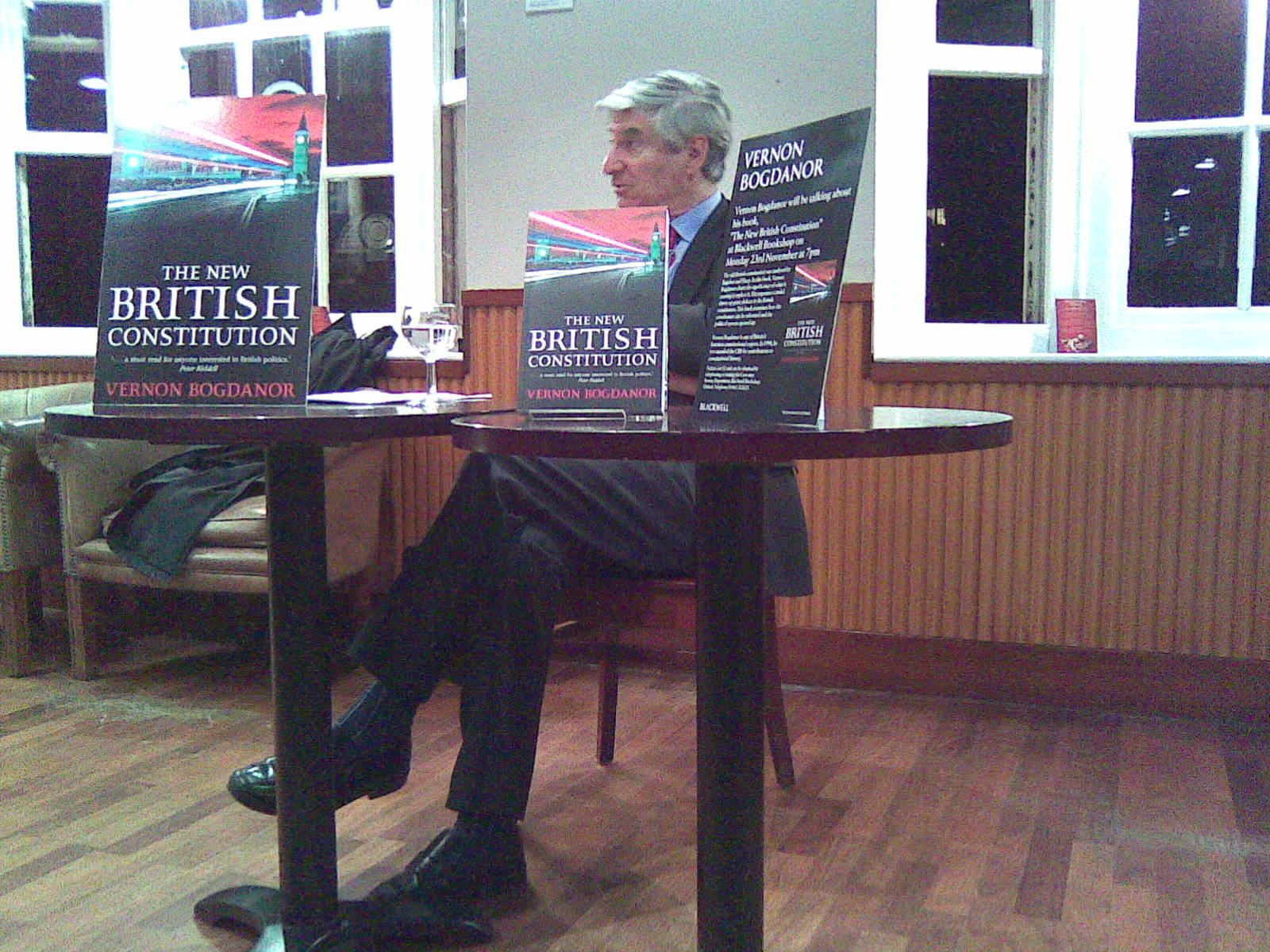
Bogdanor speaking on his book The New British Constitution in Oxford, 2009

From 1966 Bogdanor was Fellow in Politics, Senior Tutor (1979–85 and 1996–97), Vice-Principal, and (in 2002–03) Acting Principal of Brasenose College, Oxford. He is also a Fellow of the Royal Society of Arts, a Fellow of the British Academy and an Honorary Fellow of the Society for Advanced Legal Studies.

He has been a member of the Council of the Hansard Society for Parliamentary Government, Specialist Adviser to the House of Lords Select Committee on the European Communities, Member of the Court of Essex University, adviser (as a member of the Council of Europe and American Bar Association delegations) to the governments of the Czech Republic, Hungary, Israel and Slovakia on constitutional and electoral reform, member of the Academic Panel of Local Authority Associations, member of the Hansard Society Commission on the Legislative Process, member of the UK Government delegation on Democratic Institutions in Central and Eastern Europe and Conference on the Protection of Minorities, Consultant to Independent Television News (ITN) on the General Election, member of the Economic and Social Research Council's committee administering the 'Whitehall' programme, special adviser to the House of Commons Select Committee on the Public Services, member of the Swedish Constitutional Reform Project, member of the Advisory Group to the High Commissioner on National Minorities, adviser to the President of Trinidad on the Constitution of Trinidad, and member of the Economic and Social Research Council's committee administering the devolution programme.

Bogdanor is a frequent contributor to television, radio and newspapers. Between 2004 and 2008 he gave public lectures as Professor of Law at Gresham College, London. He continues to give public lectures at the college, now as Visiting professor of Political History. He has published numerous books and articles. In 2003, he edited The British Constitution in the 20th Century (published by Oxford University Press to mark the centenary of the British Academy) and authored The New British Constitution (2009), which analyses constitutional changes under the Labour government since 1997.

Bogdanor is a signatory of the statement of principles of the Henry Jackson Society.

== Comments ==
Bogdanor's most famous former student is David Cameron, who became Conservative Party leader and served as prime minister from 2010 to 2016. Bogdanor described Cameron as "one of the ablest" students he has taught, whose political views were "moderate and sensible Conservative". He has, however, expressed reservations about some of Cameron's policies, including his proposal for a British "Bill of Rights", about which Bogdanor said, "I believe it's ill thought-out and confused.... He [Cameron] may have forgotten some of the things I've taught him. I'd be happy to give him a few more tutorials on civil liberties."

Bogdanor referred to the arrest, search and questioning of the Conservative MP Damian Green, for aiding and abetting misconduct in public office by police from Special Branch, as "a storm in a teacup". "The important principle is that MPs - apart from when they're speaking in the chamber and dealing with constituents' correspondence - are subject to the same laws as the rest of us."

In 2017 Bogdanor supported a second referendum for Brexit on the contents of a final deal, saying that "Brexiters can hardly deny to their opponents the same democratic right that they claim for themselves, unless they secretly fear that the British public has, in fact, had second thoughts". However, by 2019 he had reversed his position, writing that "it has now become clear that a further referendum is not only impractical but could prove dangerous to the cohesion of the country" because it "would give rise to a dangerous narrative of betrayal amongst Leave voters which would be harmful to the democratic spirit".

In a 2021 column for The Daily Telegraph, Bogdanor decried the European Commission member Maroš Šefčovič's remark that the EU's patience with the UK was "wearing very, very thin" with regard to British implementation of the Northern Ireland Protocol; Bogdanor said the comment was "reminiscent of that of the dictators of the 1930s."

Bogdanor supports the British monarchy and the adoption of proportional representation.

== Awards and honours ==
Bogdanor was appointed Commander of the Order of the British Empire (CBE) in the 1998 Birthday Honours for services to constitutional history. In 2009, he was appointed a Chevalier de la Légion d'honneur by the president of France, Nicolas Sarkozy, for his work on the law and history of Britain and France; the honour was presented to Bogdanor by the French ambassador to the United Kingdom, Maurice Gourdault-Montagne.

He was knighted in the 2023 New Year Honours for services to political science.

== Personal life ==
Bogdanor married Judith Evelyn Beckett in 1972; the marriage was dissolved in 2000. In August 2009 he married Sonia Margaret Robertson.

== Publications ==
=== Books ===
==== Written ====
- Devolution. Oxford University Press. 1979. ISBN 978-0192191281.
- The People and the Party System: The Referendum and Electoral Reform in British Politics. Cambridge University Press. 1981. ISBN 978-0521285254.
- Multi-Party Politics and the Constitution. Cambridge University Press. 1983. ISBN 978-0521255240.
- What is Proportional Representation?. Wiley-Blackwell. 1984. ISBN 978-0855207403.
- The Monarchy and the Constitution. Clarendon Press. 1996. ISBN 978-0198277699.
- Power and the People: Guide to Constitutional Reform. Victor Gollancz Ltd. 1997. ISBN 978-0575064911.
- Devolution in the United Kingdom (2nd ed.). Oxford University Press. 1998. ISBN 978-0192801289.
- The New British Constitution. Hart Publishing. 2009. ISBN 978-1841131498.
- The Coalition and the Constitution. Hart Publishing. 2011. ISBN 978-1849461580.
- Beyond Brexit: Towards a British Constitution. I.B. Tauris. 2019. ISBN 978-1788316798.
- Britain and Europe in a Troubled World. The Henry L. Stimson Lectures Series. Yale University Press. 2020. ISBN 978-0300245615.
- The Strange Survival of Liberal Britain: Politics and Power Before the First World War. Biteback Publishing. 2022. ISBN 978-1785907623.
- Making the Weather: Six Politicians Who Changed Modern Britain. Haus Publishing. 2024. ISBN 978-1914979088.

==== Edited ====
- Bogdanor, Vernon; Butler, David, eds. (1983). Democracy and Elections: Electoral Systems and Their Political Consequences. Cambridge University Press. ISBN 978-0521272827.
- The Blackwell Encyclopedia of Political Institutions. Blackwell Publishers. 1987. ISBN 978-0631138419.
- Constitutions in Democratic Politics. Gower Publishing. 1988. ISBN 978-0566055751.
- Joined-Up Government. British Academy. 2005. ISBN 978-0197263334.

=== Articles ===
- "Power and participation." Oxford Review of Education 5, No. 2 (1979): 157–168.
- "Direct elections, representative democracy and European integration." Electoral Studies 8, No. 3 (1989): 205–216.
- "Founding elections and regime change." Electoral Studies 9, No. 4 (1990): 288–294.
- "The European Community and Sovereignty." Parliamentary Affairs 44, No. 4 (1991): 481–492. (with Geoffrey Woodcock)
- "Overcoming the twentieth century: Democracy and nationalism in Central and Eastern Europe." The Political Quarterly 66, No. 1 (1995): 84–97.
- "Ministerial accountability." Parliamentary Affairs 50, No. 1 (1997): 71–83.
- "Devolution: Decentralisation or disintegration?." The Political Quarterly 70, No. 2 (1999): 185–194.
- "Reform of the House of Lords: A sceptical view." The Political Quarterly 70, No. 4 (1999): 375–381.
- "The Guardian Has Got It Wrong" (Future of the Monarchy online debate) The Guardian. 6 December 2000.
- "Civil service reform: a critique." The Political Quarterly 72, No. 3 (2001): 291–299.
- "The Tories need a genuine liberal". The Spectator. 15 October 2005.
- "The West Lothian Question." Parliamentary Affairs (2009)
- "Mayors: Good for Britain - in the end." Prospect. 19 March 2012.
- "Why English votes for English laws is a kneejerk absurdity". The Guardian. 24 September 2014.
- "Time to ditch 'first-past-the-post'". Prospect. 22 January 2015.
- "Who pays for our politics?". Prospect. 26 March 2015.
- "Britain needs a new constitution". Prospect. 21 May 2015.
- "A second Brexit referendum? It's looking more likely by the day". The Guardian. London. 3 August 2017.
- "Parliament had failed on Brexit long before this prorogation". The Guardian. 29 August 2019.

== Notable former students ==
In addition to David Cameron, Bogdanor's former students include Kate Allen, Camilla Cavendish, Diane Coyle, Antonia Romeo, Guy Spier and Toby Young.
