= Gods in the Sky =

British television series

Gods in the Sky was a three-part British television series on Channel 4, covering astronomical religion in early civilizations. It is presented by the historian of science Allan Chapman. The series was filmed in Britain, Egypt, Greece, and Italy.

There is a book of the same name to accompany the series.
