= Ranger 9 =

Lunar space probe launched in 1965 as part of NASA's Ranger program

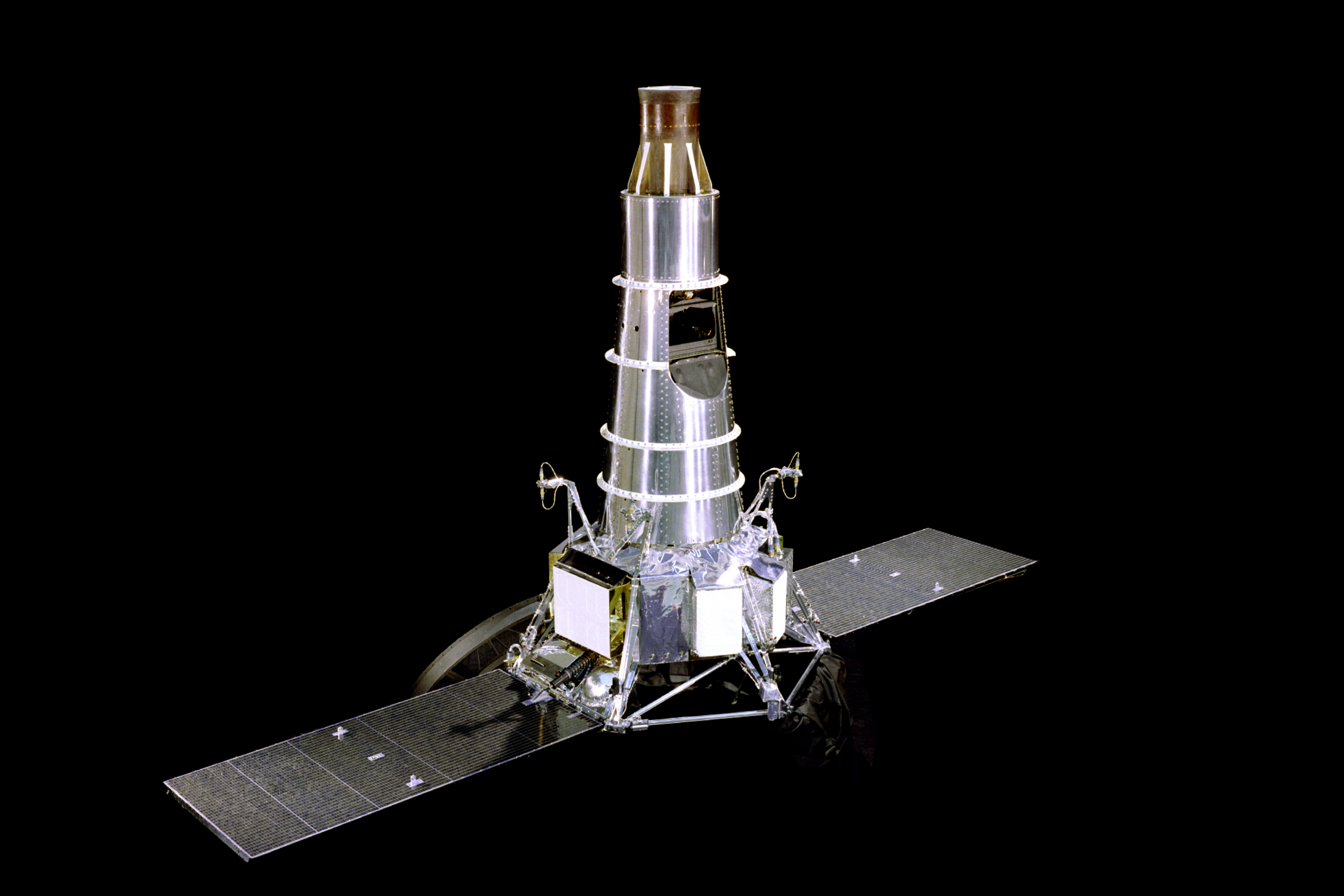
- Ranger 9
- Mission type: Lunar impactor
- Operator: NASA
- COSPAR ID: 1965-023A
- SATCAT no.: 1294
- Mission duration: 2 days, 16 hours, 31 minutes

Spacecraft properties
- Manufacturer: Jet Propulsion Laboratory
- Launch mass: 366.87 kg
- Power: 200 W

Start of mission
- Launch date: 21 March 1965, 21:37:02 UTC
- Rocket: Atlas LV-3 Agena-B 204D/AA14
- Launch site: Cape Canaveral LC-12

Lunar impactor
- Impact date: 24 March 1965, 14:08:19.994 UTC
- Impact site: 12.83°S 02.37°W (Alphonsus crater)
Instruments
- Vidicon Television Cameras

Ranger 9 was a Lunar probe, launched in 1965 by NASA. It was designed to achieve a lunar impact trajectory and to transmit high-resolution photographs of the lunar surface during the final minutes of flight up to impact. The spacecraft carried six television vidicon cameras—two wide-angle (channel F, cameras A and B) and four narrow-angle (channel P)—to accomplish these objectives. The cameras were arranged in two separate chains, or channels, each self-contained with separate power supplies, timers, and transmitters so as to afford the greatest reliability and probability of obtaining high-quality television pictures. These images were broadcast live on television to millions of viewers across the United States. No other experiments were carried on the spacecraft.

== Spacecraft design ==
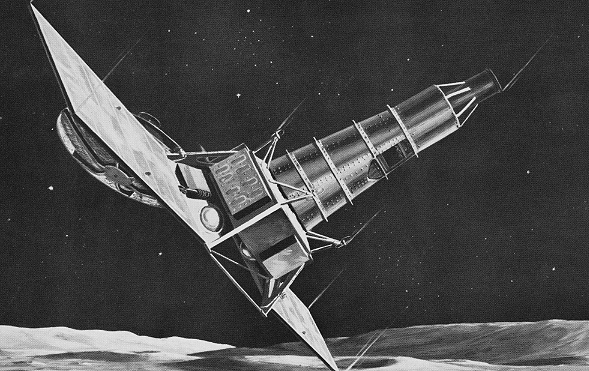
Artist impression of Ranger 9's last seconds.

Rangers 6, 7, 8, and 9 were the so-called Block 3 versions of the Ranger spacecraft. The spacecraft consisted of a hexagonal aluminium frame base 1.5 m across on which was mounted the propulsion and power units, topped by a truncated conical tower which held the TV cameras. Two solar panel wings, each 739 mm wide by 1537 mm long, extended from opposite edges of the base with a full span of 4.6 m, and a pointable high-gain dish antenna was hinge mounted at one of the corners of the base away from the solar panels. A cylindrical quasiomnidirectional antenna was seated on top of the conical tower. The overall height of the spacecraft was 3.6 m.

Propulsion for the mid-course trajectory correction was provided by a 224-N thrust monopropellant hydrazine engine with four jet-vane thrust vectoring. Orientation and attitude control about three axes was enabled by 12 nitrogen gas jets coupled to a system of three gyroscopes, four primary Sun sensors, two secondary Sun sensors, and an Earth sensor. Power was supplied by 9792 Si solar cells contained in the two solar panels, giving a total array area of 2.3 square meters and producing 200 W. Two 1,200 watt-hour batteries rated at 26.5 V with a capacity for 9 hours of operation provided power to each of the separate communication/TV camera chains. Two 1,000 watt-hour batteries stored power for spacecraft operations.

Communications were through the quasiomnidirectional low-gain antenna and the parabolic high-gain antenna. Transmitters aboard the spacecraft included a 60 W TV channel F at 959.52 MHz, a 60 W TV channel P at 960.05 MHz, and a 3 W transponder channel 8 at 960.58 MHz. The telecommunications equipment converted the composite video signal from the camera transmitters into an RF signal for subsequent transmission through the spacecraft high-gain antenna. Sufficient video bandwidth was provided to allow for rapid framing sequences of both narrow and wide-angle television pictures.

== Mission profile ==
Images from Ranger 9 during its descent

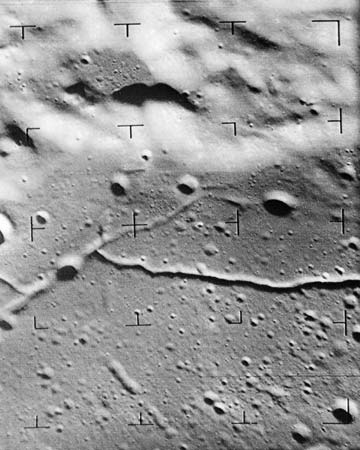
Ranger 9 image showing rilles on the floor of Alphonsus Crater.

The Atlas 204D and Agena B 6007 boosters performed nominally, injecting the Agena and Ranger 9 into an Earth parking orbit at 185-kilometre (115 mi) altitude. A 90-second Agena second burn put the spacecraft into lunar transfer trajectory. This was followed by the separation of the Agena and Ranger. Seventy minutes after launch, the command was given to deploy solar panels, activate attitude control, and switch from the omniantenna to the high-gain antenna. The accuracy of the initial trajectory enabled delay of the planned mid-course correction from 22 to 23 March when the maneuver was initiated at 12:03 UT. After orientation, a 31-second rocket burn at 12:30 UT, and reorientation, the maneuver was completed at 13:30 UT.

Ranger 9 reached the Moon on 24 March 1965. At 13:31 UTC, a terminal maneuver was executed to orient the spacecraft so the cameras were more in line with the flight direction to improve the resolution of the pictures. 20 minutes before impact, the one-minute camera system warm-up began. The first image was taken at 13:49:41 UTC at an altitude of 2,363 kilometres (1,468 mi). Transmission of 5,814 good contrast photographs was made during the final 19 minutes of flight. The final image taken before impact has a resolution of 0.3 metres (12 in). The spacecraft encountered the lunar surface with an incoming asymptotic direction at an angle of -5.6 degrees from the lunar equator. The orbit plane was inclined 15.6 degrees to the lunar equator. After 64.5 hours of flight, impact occurred at 14:08:19.994 UTC at approximately 12.83 S latitude, 357.63 E longitude in the Alphonsus crater. Impact velocity was 2,670 metres per second (8,800 ft/s). The spacecraft performance was excellent. Real-time television coverage with live network broadcasts of many of the F-channel images (primarily camera B but also some camera A pictures) were provided for this flight.

== See also ==
- Ranger program
- Timeline of Solar System exploration
- List of artificial objects on the Moon
- List of missions to the Moon
