= Visiting Gresham Professor =

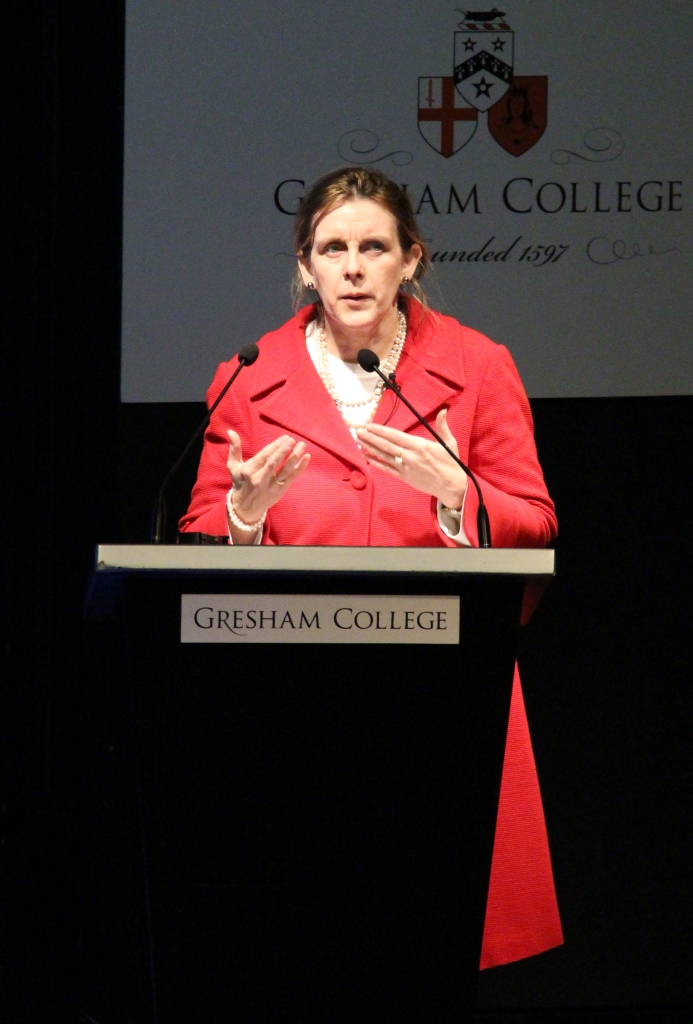
Gwen Adshead delivering a Gresham College lecture in 2015

Visiting Professors at Gresham College, London, give free educational lectures to the general public. The college was founded for this purpose in 1597, when it created seven professorships; this was later increased to ten. The first visiting professors were appointed in 2000.

== List of Visiting Gresham Professors ==
	Name	Subject	Started
1	Baroness Warnock of Weeke	Rhetoric	2000
2	Abdullah Ibrahim	Music	2000
3	Robin Wilson	History of Mathematics	2001
4	Richard Langham Smith	Music	2003
5	Allan Chapman FRAS	History of Science	2003
6	Raj Persaud	Psychiatry	2004
7	Sir Richard J. Evans FRSL FBA	History	2008
8	Sir Vernon Bogdanor CBE FBA FRSA	Political History	2008
9	Glenn D. Wilson	Psychology	2009
10	Simon Thurley CBE	The Built Environment	2009
11	Tony Mann	Computing Mathematics	2012
12	Steve Jones FRS	Genetics	2013
13	Sir Christopher Whitty KCB FRCP FRS	Public Health	2013
14	Lynda Nead FBA	History of Art	2013
15	Jane Caplan	History	2013
16	Helga Drummond	Business	2014
17	Gwen Adshead	Psychiatry	2014
18	Ian Christie FBA	History of Film and Media	2017
19	Craig Clunas	Chinese Art	2017
20	Edith Hall	Classics	2017
21	Roger Kneebone	Medical Education	2018
22	Yorick Wilks	Artificial Intelligence	2018
23	The Revd Canon Richard Burridge	Ethics and Theology	2018
24	Sir Stephen Sparks CBE FRS	Geology	2018
25	Jeremy Summerly	Music History	2019
26	Jim Endersby	History of Science	2019
27	Roberto Trotta	Cosmology	2019
28	Thomas Grant KC	Politics and Law	2020
29	John Mullan	English Literature	2020
30	Martin Daunton	Economic History	2020
31	Imogen Goold	Medical Law	2021
32	Sir Christopher Whitty KCB FRCP FRS	Public Health	2022
33	Ian Mudway	Environmental Health	2022
34	Dominic Broomfield-McHugh	Film and Theatre Music	2023
