= Arzachel (crater) =

Crater on the Moon

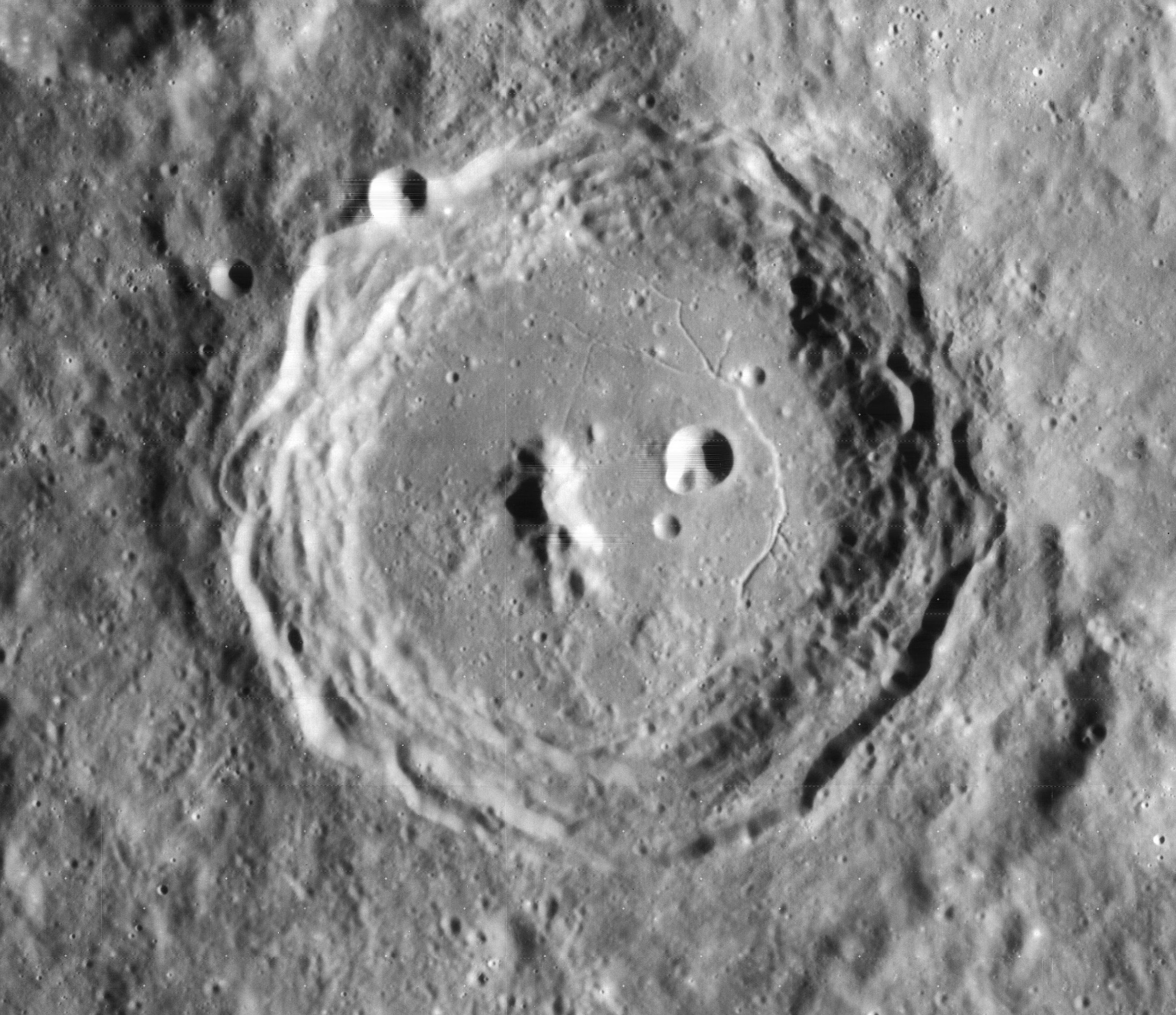
- Mosaic of Lunar Orbiter 4 images
- Coordinates: 18.2°S 1.9°W
- Diameter: 96.99 km (60.27 mi)
- Depth: 3.6 km
- Colongitude: 3° at sunrise
- Formation: Early Imbrian
- Eponym: Abū Ishāq Ibrāhīm al-Zarqālī

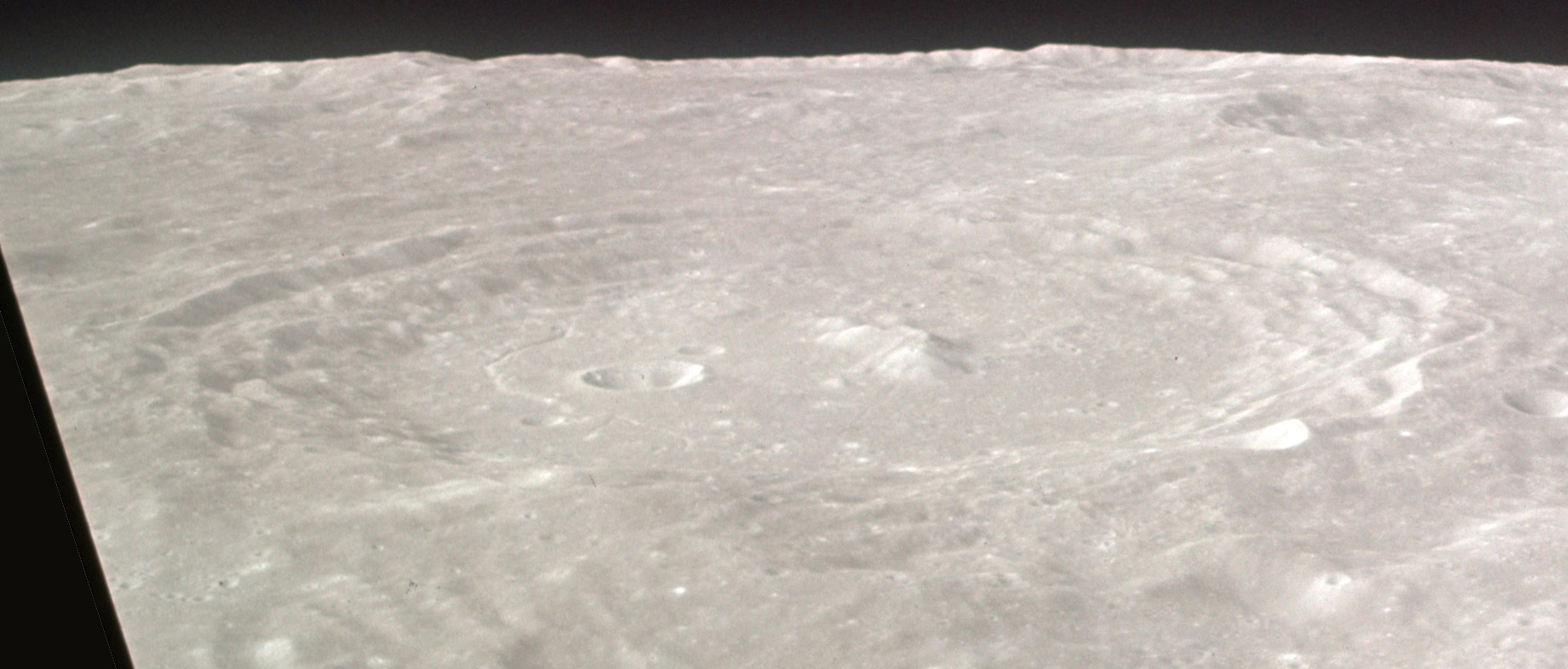
Oblique view from Apollo 12, facing south

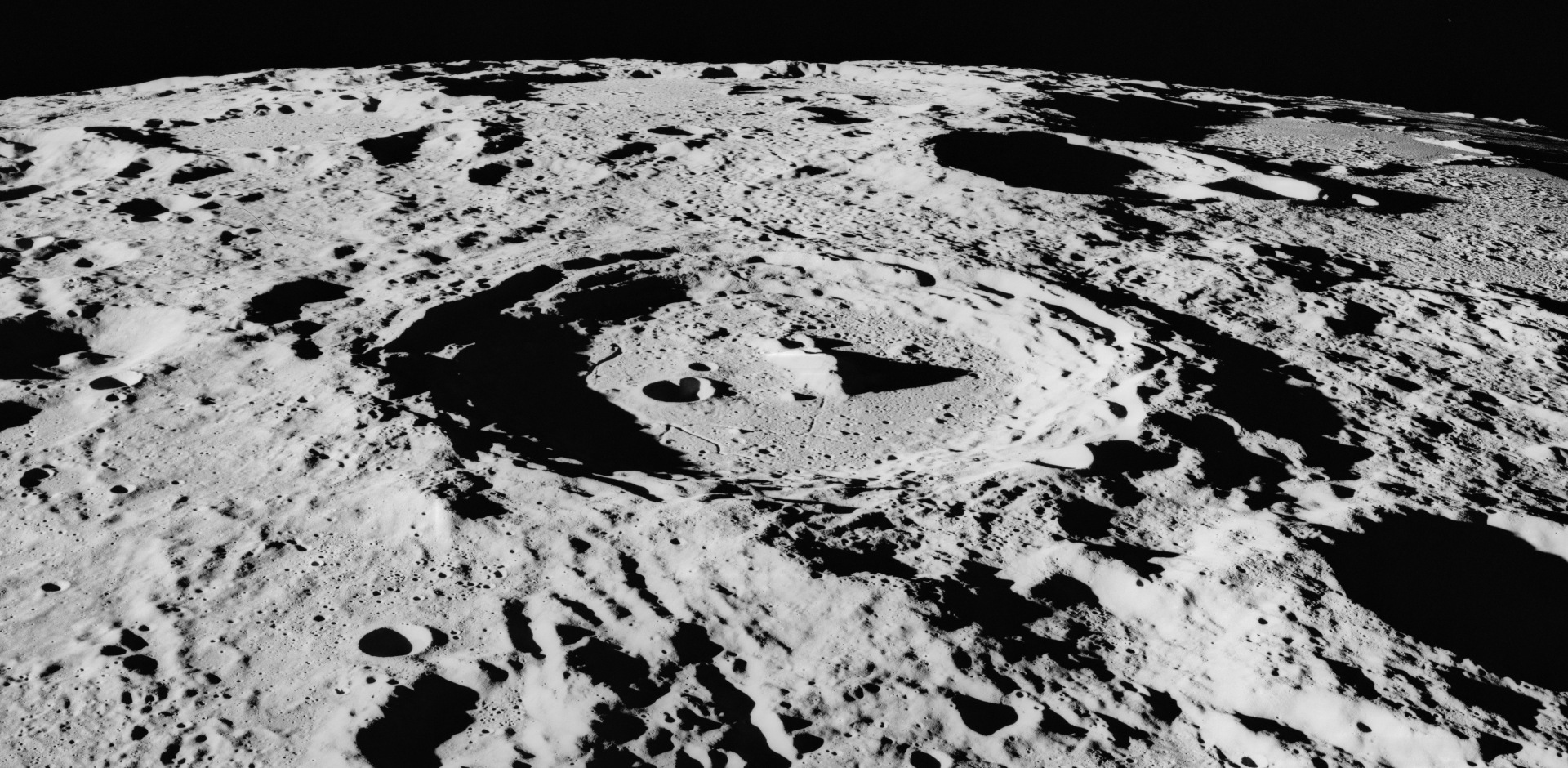
Oblique view from Apollo 16, facing south

Arzachel is a relatively undegraded lunar impact crater located in the highlands in the south-central part of the visible Moon, close to the zero meridian (the visible center of the Moon). It lies to the south of the crater Alphonsus, and together with Ptolemaeus further north the three form a prominent chain of craters to the east of Mare Nubium. The smaller Alpetragius lies to the northwest, and Thebit is to the southwest along the edge of the mare.

Arzachel is a Latinization of the name of the Arab astronomer and mathematician Abū Ishāq Ibrāhīm al-Zarqālī (died 1100). This designation was formally adopted by the International Astronomical Union in 1935. Like many of the craters on the Moon's near side, Arzachel was named by Giovanni Riccioli, whose 1651 nomenclature system has become standardized. Earlier lunar cartographers had given the feature different names: Michael van Langren's 1645 map calls it "Annae, Reg. Fran.", after Anne, the Regent of France, and Johannes Hevelius called it "Mons Cragus" after one of the Mount Craguses of the ancient world.

== Description ==
Arzachel is remarkably clear in its structure and a favorite telescope viewing subject for advanced amateur astronomers. The rim of Arzachel shows little sign of wear and has a detailed terrace structure on the interior, especially on the slightly higher eastern rim. There is a rough outer rampart that joins a ridge running from the north rim to southern rim of Alphonsus.

On the lunar geologic timescale, Arzachel is a crater of Lower (Early) Imbrian age. Despite the generally circular shape of this formation, evidence suggests it was formed by an oblique impactor arriving from the south. The rugged central peak of Arzachel is prominent, rising 1.5 kilometers above the floor, and is somewhat offset to the west with a bowed curve from south to north-northeast. The mineralogical composition of the peak area consists mainly of spinel- and low-calcium pyroxene-bearing rocks. The spectra of the peak itself and the inner wall are consistent with anorthositic norite, with a similar composition for the floor.

The floor is relatively flat, except for some irregularities in the southwestern quadrant of the crater. It is considered a floor-fractured crater (FFC), with radial and concentric fractures. However, unlike typical FFCs, its fractures are not prominent. There is a rille system named the Rimae Arzachel that runs from the northern wall to the southeast rim; the western side of this rille has a higher elevation than the east. A small crater, Arzachel A, lies prominently in the floor to the east of the central peak, with a pair of smaller craterlets located nearby.

== Satellite features ==
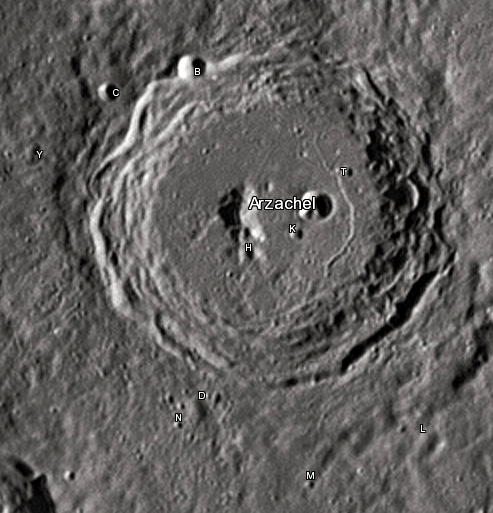
Arzachel crater and its satellite craters taken from Earth in 2012 at the University of Hertfordshire's Bayfordbury Observatory with the telescopes Meade LX200 14" and Lumenera Skynyx 2-1

By convention these features are identified on lunar maps by placing the letter on the side of the feature midpoint that is closest to Arzachel.

| Arzachel | Latitude | Longitude | Diameter |
|---|---|---|---|
| A | 18.0° S | 1.5° W | 10 km |
| B | 17.0° S | 2.9° W | 8 km |
| C | 17.4° S | 3.7° W | 6 km |
| D | 20.2° S | 2.1° W | 8 km |
| H | 18.7° S | 2.0° W | 5 km |
| K | 18.3° S | 1.6° W | 4 km |
| L | 20.0° S | 0.1° E | 8 km |
| M | 20.6° S | 0.9° W | 3 km |
| N | 20.4° S | 2.2° W | 3 km |
| T | 17.7° S | 1.3° W | 3 km |
| Y | 18.2° S | 4.3° W | 4 km |

Arzachel E is the name for a terrace feature inside the southwest rim, and Arzachel F for the same inside the southeast rim.
