= Behaim (crater) =

Lunar impact crater

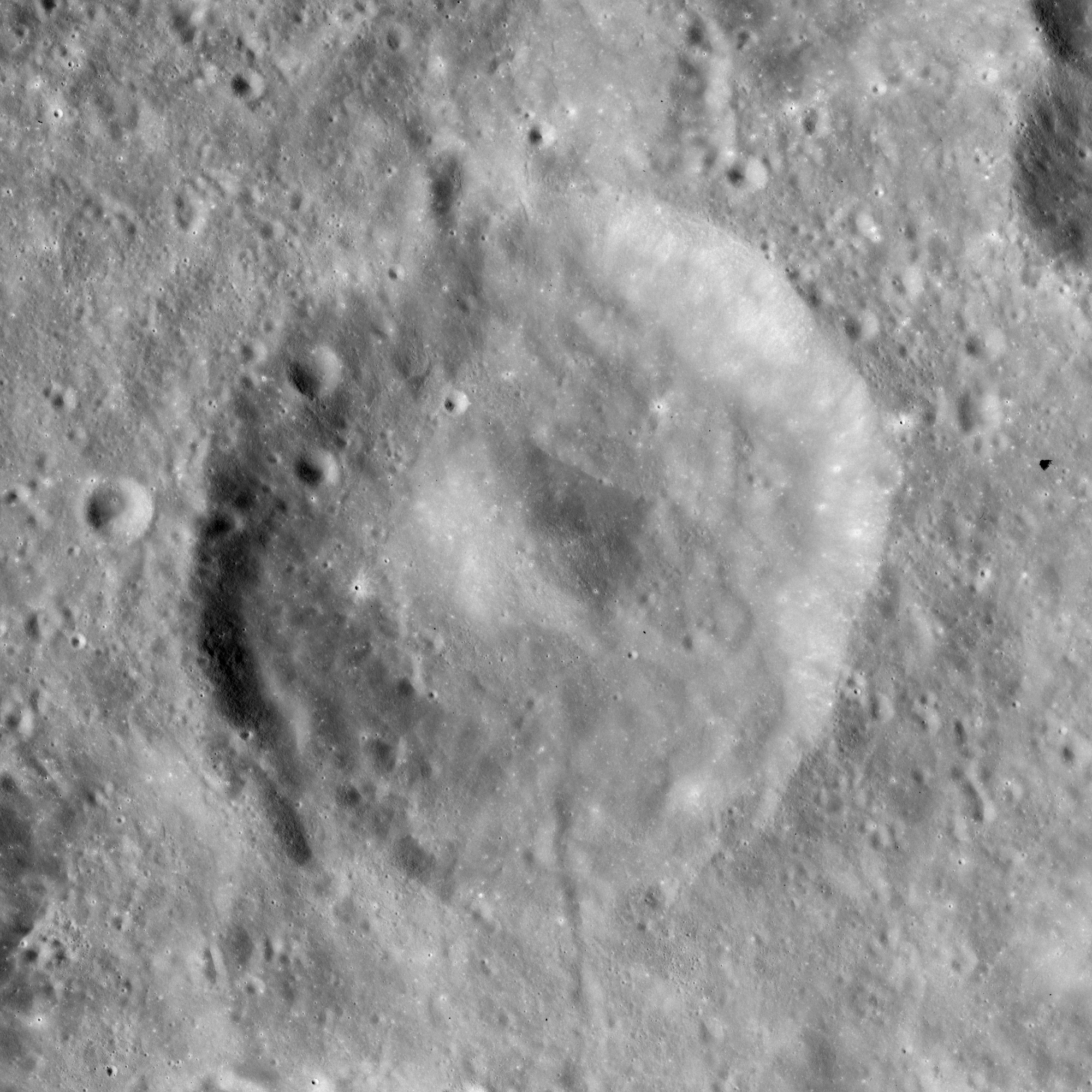
- Apollo 15 image
- Coordinates: 16.5°S 79.4°E
- Diameter: 56.21 km (34.93 mi)
- Depth: 2.1 km (1.3 mi)
- Colongitude: 282° at sunrise
- Eponym: Martin Behaim

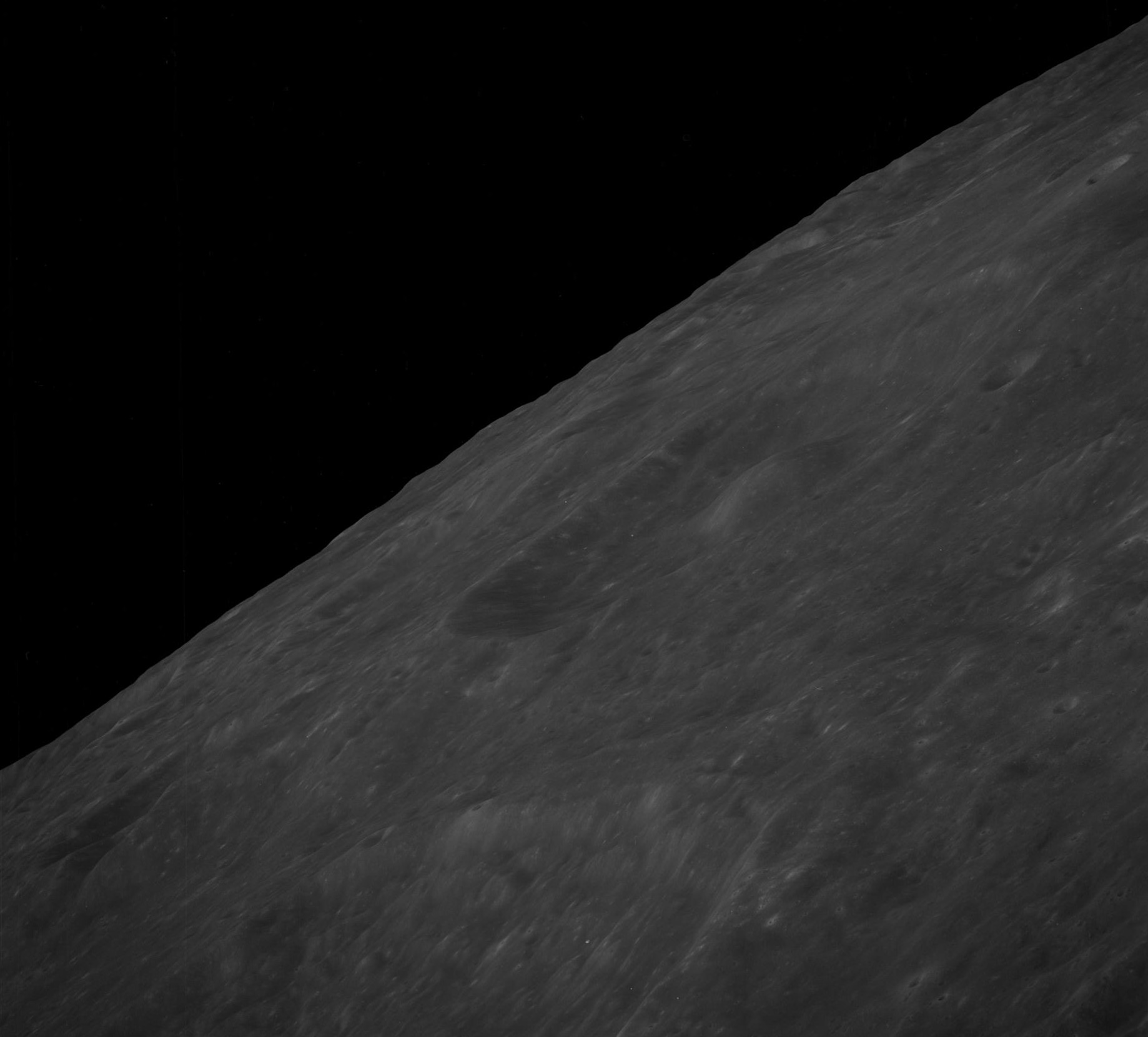
Oblique view from Apollo 8

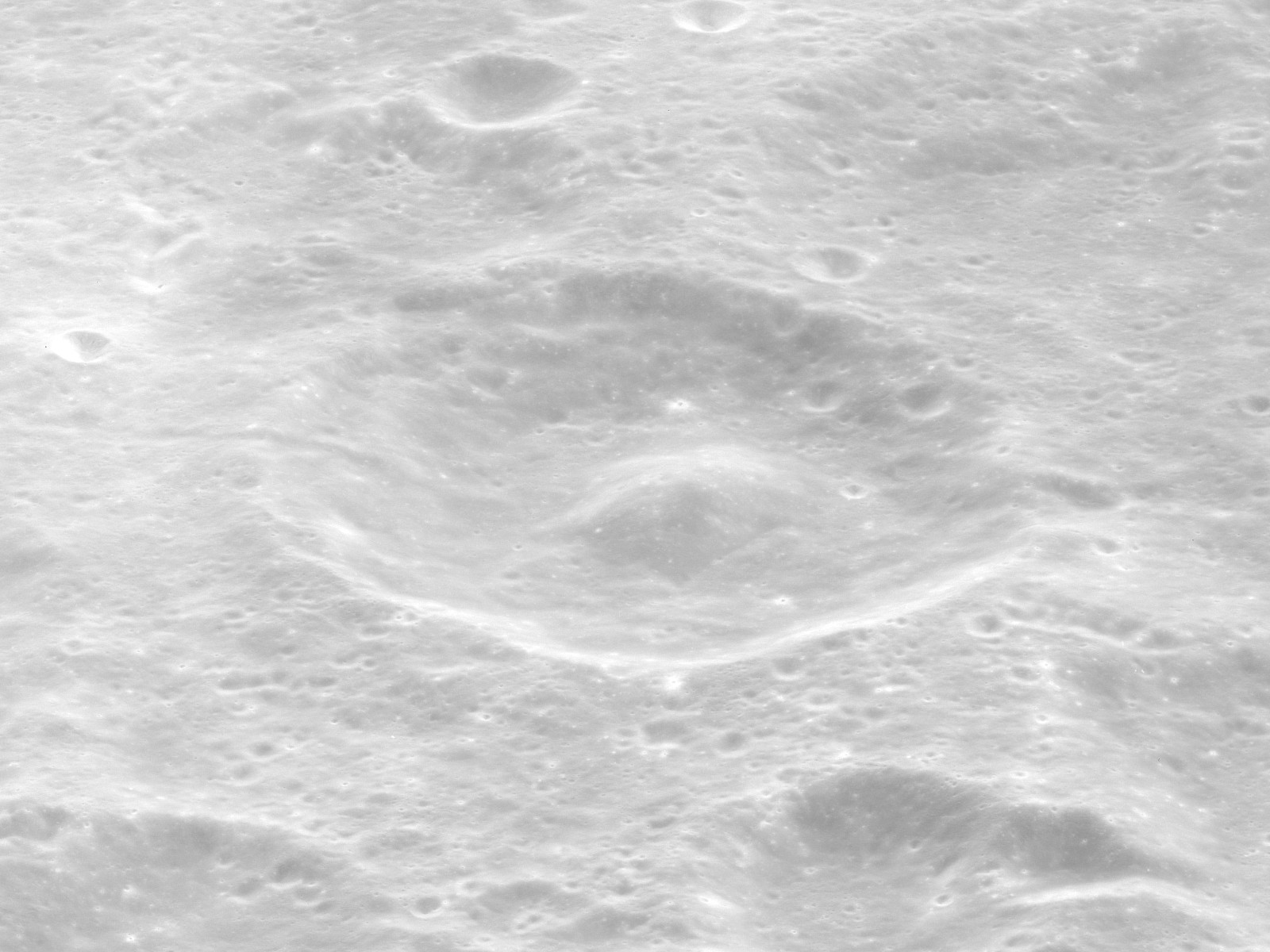
Oblique view from Apollo 17

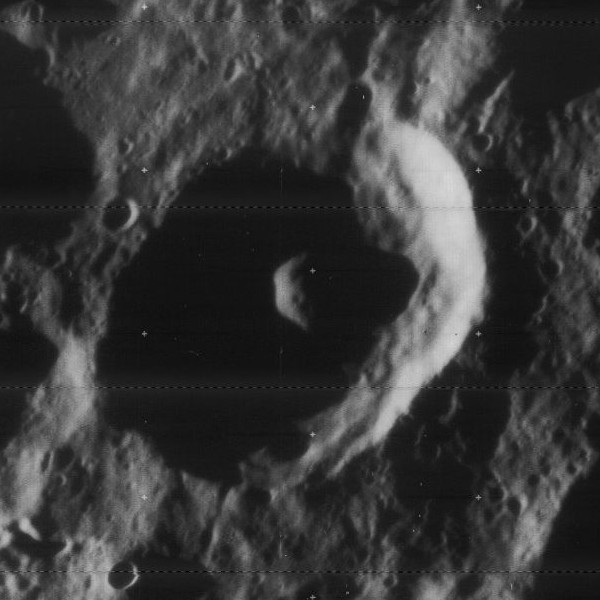
Lunar Orbiter 4 image

Behaim is a lunar impact crater that is located near the eastern limb of the Moon, just to the south of the crater Ansgarius. Because of its location, the observability of Behaim is subject to libration. To the south of Behaim is the crater Hecataeus, and to the east-southeast is Gibbs. The prominent central peak gives Behaim a similar appearance to Alpetragius crater near the center of the near side, although Behaim is larger.

The inner walls along the rim of Behaim still displays traces of old, worn terraces. The rim has received a negligible amount of wear from subsequent bombardment, but does not form a circular shape due to an inward bulge along the northern wall. The crater has a notable central peak at the midpoint of the interior floor. A cleft-like feature crosses the southern rim and continues to the south.

This crater is named after German navigator and cartographer Martin Behaim (1459-1507). The name was incorporated into lunar nomenclature by Johann Mädler during the 19th century. Its designation was formally approved by the International Astronomical Union in 1935.

== Satellite craters ==
By convention these features are identified on lunar maps by placing the letter on the side of the crater midpoint that is closest to Behaim.

Behaim	Latitude	Longitude	Diameter
B	16.1° S	76.8° E	24 km
Ba	16.4° S	76.0° E	14 km
C	16.7° S	77.8° E	13 km
N	16.1° S	73.5° E	9 km
S	16.6° S	81.4° E	25 km
T	16.1° S	81.3° E	11 km
