= Alpetragius (crater) =

Lunar impact crater

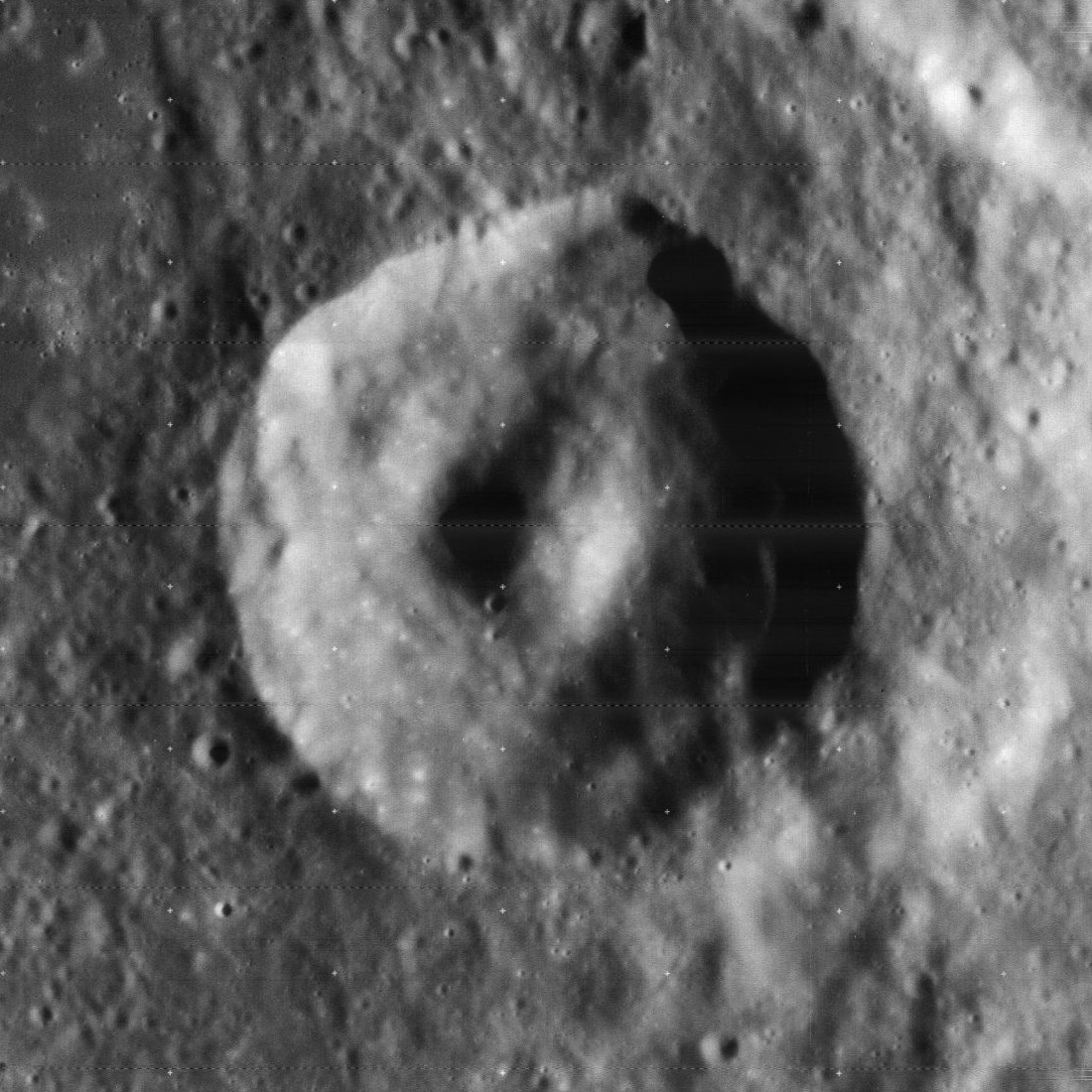
- Lunar Orbiter 4 image
- Coordinates: 16.0°S 4.5°W
- Diameter: 39.00 km (24.23 mi)
- Depth: 3.9 km (2.4 mi)
- Colongitude: 5° at sunrise
- Eponym: Nur ad-Din al-Bitruji

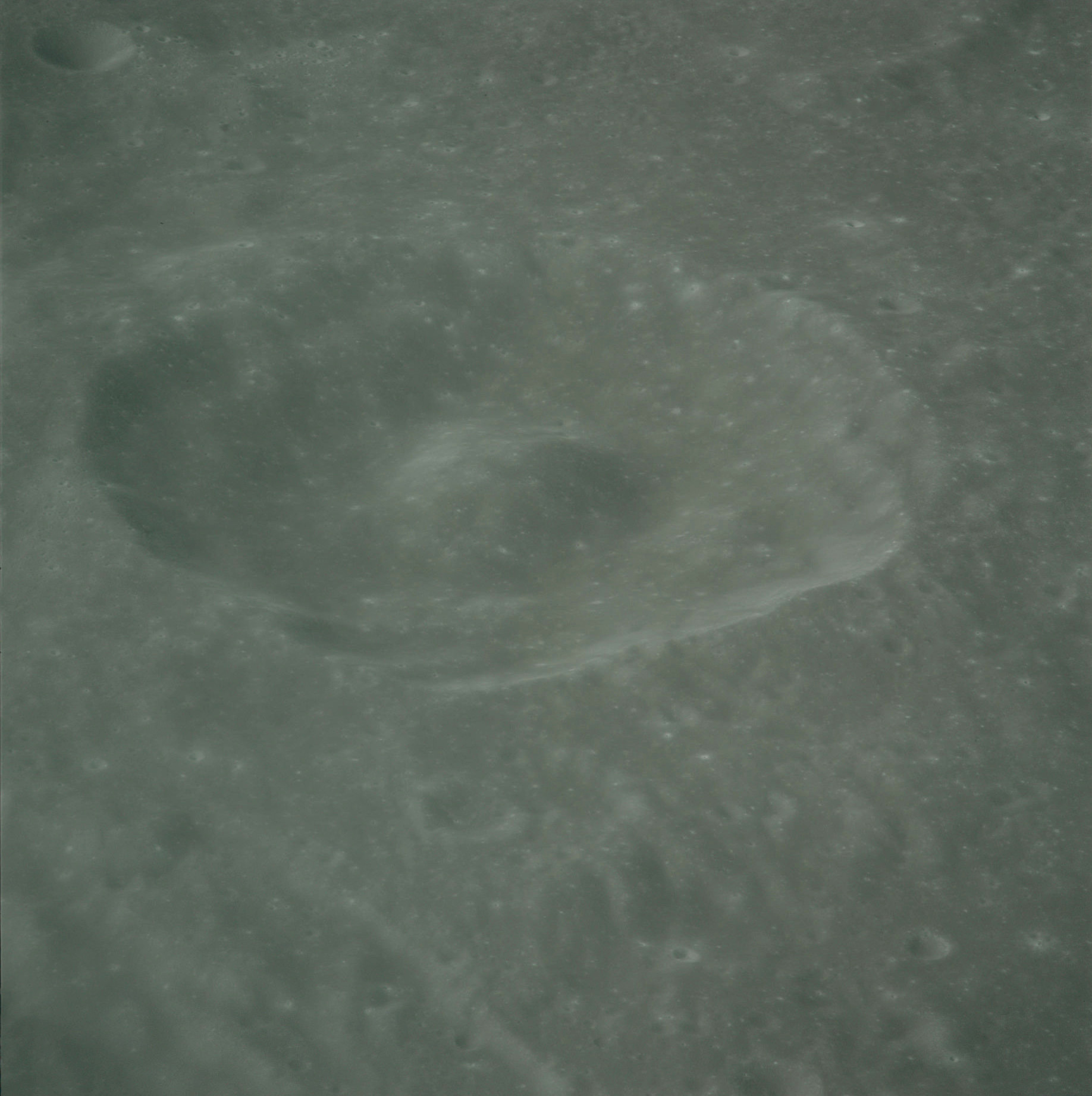
Oblique view from Apollo 16

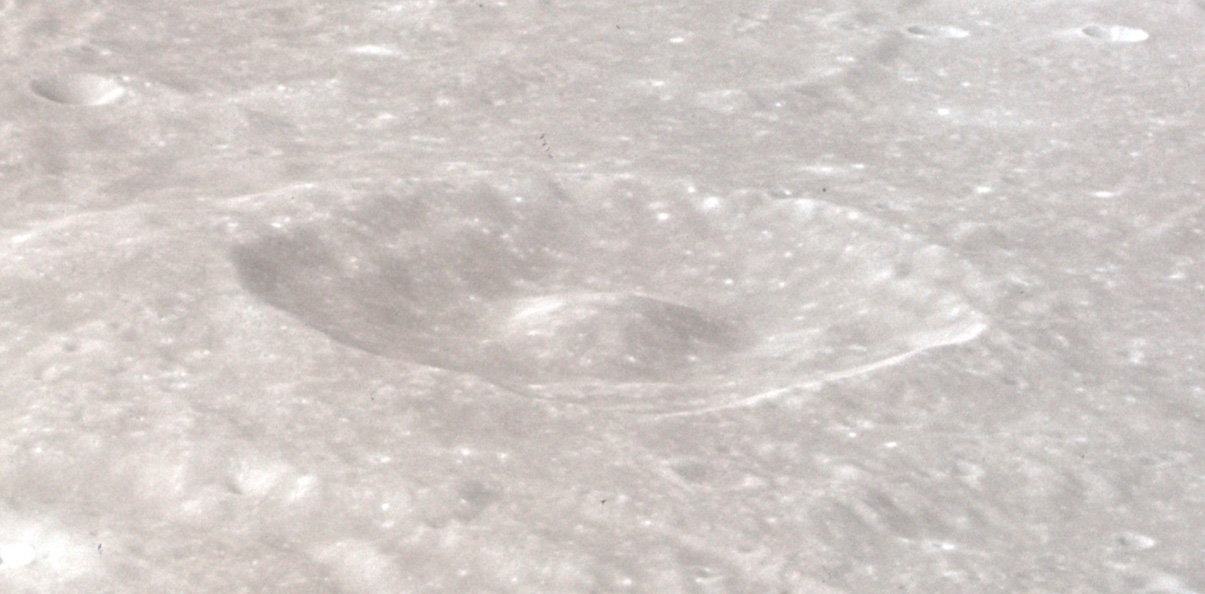
Oblique view from Apollo 12

Alpetragius is a lunar impact crater located on the eastern edge of Mare Nubium, to the southwest of the much larger crater Alphonsus. T. W. Webb noted that it "is so deep ... as to be only 5 or 6 days free from shadow" during a lunar day. "It contains one of the finest central peaks in the Moon." In the southeast is the prominent crater Arzachel, and to the west lies the flooded Lassell.

The most notable feature of this crater is the disproportionately large central peak, which forms a rounded rise that occupies almost the entire crater floor—one-third the crater diameter—and rises to a height of 3.5 km. The rim has fine terraces that slope down to near the edge of the central rise along the south and east sides. This outer wall is nearly round, with slight protrusions on the north and west sides.

The outer rim is joined to the southwest rim of Alphonsus by a rise in the surface. An arc of craterous depressions from the south rim of Alphonsus curves to the west, dividing Alpetragius from Arzachel crater. To the west-northwest is the crater-like outline of Alpetragius X, now flooded by the mare and overlain across the east by ejecta from Alpetragius. Alpetragius is similar in appearance to Behaim crater, although Behaim is larger.

Alpetragius is a Latinization of the name of Nur ad-Din al-Bitruji, a Spanish-Arab astronomer (unkn-c. 1100). His name was introduced into lunar nomenclature by Italian astronomer G. B. Ricciolli in 1651. Its designation was formally adopted by the International Astronomical Union in 1935.

== Satellite craters ==
By convention these features are identified on lunar maps by placing the letter on the side of the crater midpoint that is closest to Alpetragius.

Alpetragius	Latitude	Longitude	Diameter
B	15.1° S	6.8° W	10 km
C	13.7° S	6.1° W	2 km
G	18.2° S	6.5° W	12 km
H	18.0° S	6.0° W	5 km
J	18.0° S	5.7° W	4 km
M	16.5° S	3.2° W	24 km
N	16.7° S	3.8° W	11 km
U	17.7° S	5.1° W	14 km
V	18.1° S	5.8° W	17 km
W	17.9° S	6.0° W	27 km
X	15.6° S	5.7° W	32 km
