= Gresham Professor of the Environment =

Position at Gresham College in London, England

The Professor of the Environment at Gresham College in London, England, gives free educational lectures to the general public. The college was founded for this purpose in 1597, when it created seven professorships; this was later increased to ten. The Gresham Professorship of the Environment was created in 2014, thanks to sponsorship by the Frank Jackson Foundation. It is the second Professorship to have been created at the College since its establishment.

== Gresham Professors of the Environment ==
	Name	Started
1.	Carolyn Roberts	2014
2.	Jacqueline McGlade	2018
3.	Myles Allen	2022
4.	Helen Czerski	2025
