= Co-op Academy Swinton =

The Co-op Academy Swinton

Location
- Sefton Road; Pendlebury; Manchester, M27 6JU; England; 53°31′00″N 2°20′25″W

Information
- Type: Academy
- Established: 2011
- Department for Education URN: 136987 Tables
- Ofsted: Reports
- Chair of Governors: Simon Plunkett
- Head of Academy: Zarina Ali (Head of Academy)
- Staff: 70
- Gender: Mixed
- Age: 11 to 16
- Enrolment: 829
- Capacity: 1,075
- Colours: Navy and Sky Blue
- Website: https://www.swinton.coopacademies.co.uk/

The Co-op Academy Swinton is in Greater Manchester, England. Although named The Swinton High School in September 1988 when Wardley High School and Pendlebury High School merged, forming a single comprehensive school for pupils aged 11 to 16, on one site located half a mile from Swinton town centre. The Swinton High School joined the Co-op Academies Trust in March 2018 and is since known as 'Co-op Academy Swinton'.

== History ==
During much of the 20th century the school was known by its original name, Cromwell Road School. In the mid 1930s the school divided into separate secondary schools for boys and girls.

The boys' school became known as Cromwell Road Secondary Modern School for Boys was located in the 1930s building which still to this day, has its entrance on Sefton Road. The girls' school became known as Cromwell Road Secondary Modern School for Girls and was located within the original pre-First World War building on nearby Warwick Street, which runs between Sefton Road and Cromwell Road. The original Warwick Street school provided education for infant, junior and senior pupils. In 1973, the boys' and girls' schools were merged to form a single school for secondary education on the joint Sefton Road/Warwick Street sites and given the name Pendlebury High School.

== Refurbishment ==
Whilst the buildings vary considerably in age and appearance, a new Maths suite, an ICT resource area comprising six Computer Rooms, a Design Technology block and refurbished Art and Library facilities, have all greatly improved the teaching environment. Over five years from 2008, all seven Science Labs have been completely refurbished, in a programme costing over £500,000.

== Staff development and academic performance ==
The school has a staffing complement of approximately 70, full and part-time. There are 5 Senior Leaders, including the Headteacher, and 6 Faculty Leaders. The school places high emphasis on staff development both for school improvement and personal professional development. There is a successful induction programme for new staff, which has been praised by Ofsted and Investors in People. The school's Ofsted inspections have consistently attained strong results. As of June 2019 the school is recognised as 'Good' in all areas.

== Extracurricular activities and study support ==
The school provides a range of extra-curricular activities in drama, sport, music and dance. The school's musical activities and its steel pans performances have an excellent reputation. Study support is an integral part of the school. The summer of 2013 marked the first Summer School for gifted and talented pupils in years 6 and 7, since 1948.

== Previous headteachers ==
- Mrs Zarina Ali (2021-Current)
- Mr Mark Harrison (Left in 2021)
- Mr John Biddlestone (Died in 2016)
- Mr Wynne (until 2001)
- Mr Frank Cawley - boys' school (From c. 1959)
- Mr Arthur Holt - boys' school (Retired late 1950s)

== Notable former pupils ==
- Kenneth Wolstenhome Football Commentator (1920-2002)
- Allan Chapman, historian and occasional TV presenter, born 1946
- Bob Dunn, Conservative Party politician, (1946–2003)
- Graham Williams (1944–1994), rugby league scrum-half in the 1960s for Lancashire, Swinton, North Sydney and Manly
- Derek Whitehead (born 1944), rugby league fullback in the 1960s and 1970s for Great Britain, Lancashire, Swinton, Oldham and Warrington
- Les Holliday (born 1962), rugby league forward for Great Britain, Cumbria, Swinton (captain), Halifax, Widnes and Dewsbury
- Simon Barker, ex professional footballer and PFA official.
