= William Lassell =

English merchant and astronomer (1799–1880)

William Lassell FRS FRSE FRSL FRAS
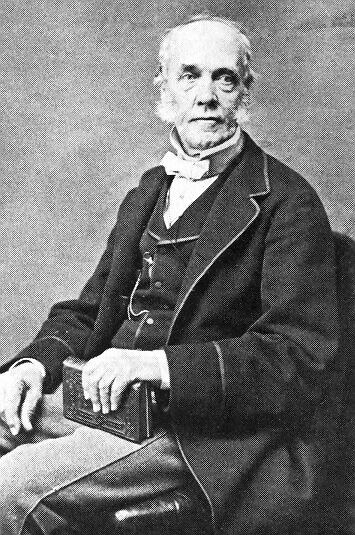
- Born: 18 June 1799; Bolton, England
- Died: 5 October 1880 (aged 81); Maidenhead, England
- Known for: Discovered the moons Triton, Hyperion, Ariel and Umbriel
- Awards: Gold Medal of the Royal Astronomical Society (1849); Royal Medal (1858)
- Scientific career
- Fields: Astronomer

William Lassell (18 June 1799 – 5 October 1880) was an English merchant and astronomer. He is remembered for his improvements to the reflecting telescope and his ensuing discoveries of four planetary satellites.

== Life ==
William Lassell was born in Bolton, Lancashire, on 18 June 1799. He received his early education in Bolton and later attended Rochdale Academy. After the death of his father, William Lassell was apprenticed to a merchant in Liverpool from 1814 to 1821. He later made his fortune as a beer brewer, which afforded him the means to pursue his passion for astronomy. He built an observatory at his house "Starfield" in West Derby, a suburb of Liverpool. There he had a 24-inch (610 mm) aperture metal mirror reflector telescope (a.k.a. the "two-foot" telescope), for which he pioneered the use of an equatorial mount for easy tracking of objects as the Earth rotates. He ground and polished the mirror himself, using equipment he constructed. The observatory was later (1854) moved further out of Liverpool, to Bradstones.

In 1846, Lassell discovered Triton, the largest moon of Neptune, just 17 days after the discovery of Neptune itself by German astronomer Johann Gottfried Galle, using his self-built instrument. In 1848, he independently co-discovered Hyperion, a moon of Saturn. In 1851 he discovered Ariel and Umbriel, two moons of Uranus.

In 1855, he built a 48-inch (1,200 mm) telescope, which he installed in Malta because of the observing conditions that were better than in often-overcast England. While in Malta his astronomical observing assistant was Albert Marth. On his return to the UK after several years in Malta, he moved to Maidenhead and operated his 24-inch (610 mm) telescope in an observatory there. The 48-inch telescope was dismantled and was eventually scrapped. The 24-inch telescope was later moved to Royal Observatory, Greenwich in the 1880s, but eventually dismantled.

Lassell was a Fellow of the Royal Astronomical Society (FRAS) from 1839, won the Gold Medal of the Royal Astronomical Society in 1849, and served as its president for two years starting in 1870. He was elected a Fellow of the Royal Society (FRS) in 1849 and won their Royal Medal in 1858. Lassell was also a Fellow of the Royal Society of Literature (FRSL). He was furthermore elected an honorary Fellow of the Royal Society of Edinburgh (HonFRSE) and of the Society of Sciences of Upsala, and received an honorary LL.D. degree from the University of Cambridge in 1874.

Lassell died in Maidenhead in 1880 and is buried at St. Luke's Church. Upon his death, he left a fortune of £80,000 (roughly equivalent to £8,300,000 in 2025). His telescope was presented to the Royal Observatory in Greenwich.

The crater Lassell on the Moon, a crater on Mars, the asteroid 2636 Lassell and a ring of Neptune are named in his honour. At the University of Liverpool the William Lassell prize is awarded to the student with the highest grades graduating the B.Sc. program in Physics with Astronomy each year.

In Alfred Bester's novel The Stars My Destination, an inhabited moon of Neptune is named Lassell.

== Obituaries ==
- Astronomical Register, 18 (1880), p. 284
- Nature, 22 (1880), p. 565
- The Observatory, 3 (1880), p. 587
- Monthly Notices of the Royal Astronomical Society, 41 (1880), p. 188

== See also ==
- List of largest optical telescopes in the 19th century
