= Matt Jones (interaction designer) =

British academic and writer about technology

Matt Jones is a professor at Swansea University who researches and writes about technology.

== Career ==
From March 2011 to August 2014 he was head of the Department of Computer Science at Swansea University. From 2014 he was head of science at Swansea. In October 2020 he set up the Morgan Advanced Studies Institute at Swansea, and is the director. He directs the EPSRC Centre for Doctoral Training in Human Driven AI and is the principal investigator of the Computational Foundry.

His work has included studies and prototypes for mobile search and browsing; pedestrian navigation; and multi-modality(so a key early shaper of Mobile Interaction). Since the early 2000s he has been pursuing a mobile research agenda focused on interfaces and interactions for "developing world" users, looking at how to address issues around lower computer and textual literacy and resource access. He has been awarded a Royal Society Wolfson Research Merit Award for this work.

He has worked with Microsoft Research, Reuters and Orange. He has spent time as visiting fellow at Nokia Research, Finland. He was on the Scientific Advisory Board of Nokia Research (Tampere and Helsinki Labs). In 2010 he was awarded an IBM Faculty Award to work with the Spoken Web group in IBM Research India (Delhi).

== Writing ==
- Mobile Interaction Design (ISBN 0-470-09089-8), with Gary Marsden
- There's Not an App for That (Morgan Kaufmann, 2015), with Marsden and Simon Robinson

He has edited special issues of journals, including an ACM ToCHI journal special issue on social issues and the "turn to the wild".
