= Alphonsus (crater) =

Crater on the Moon

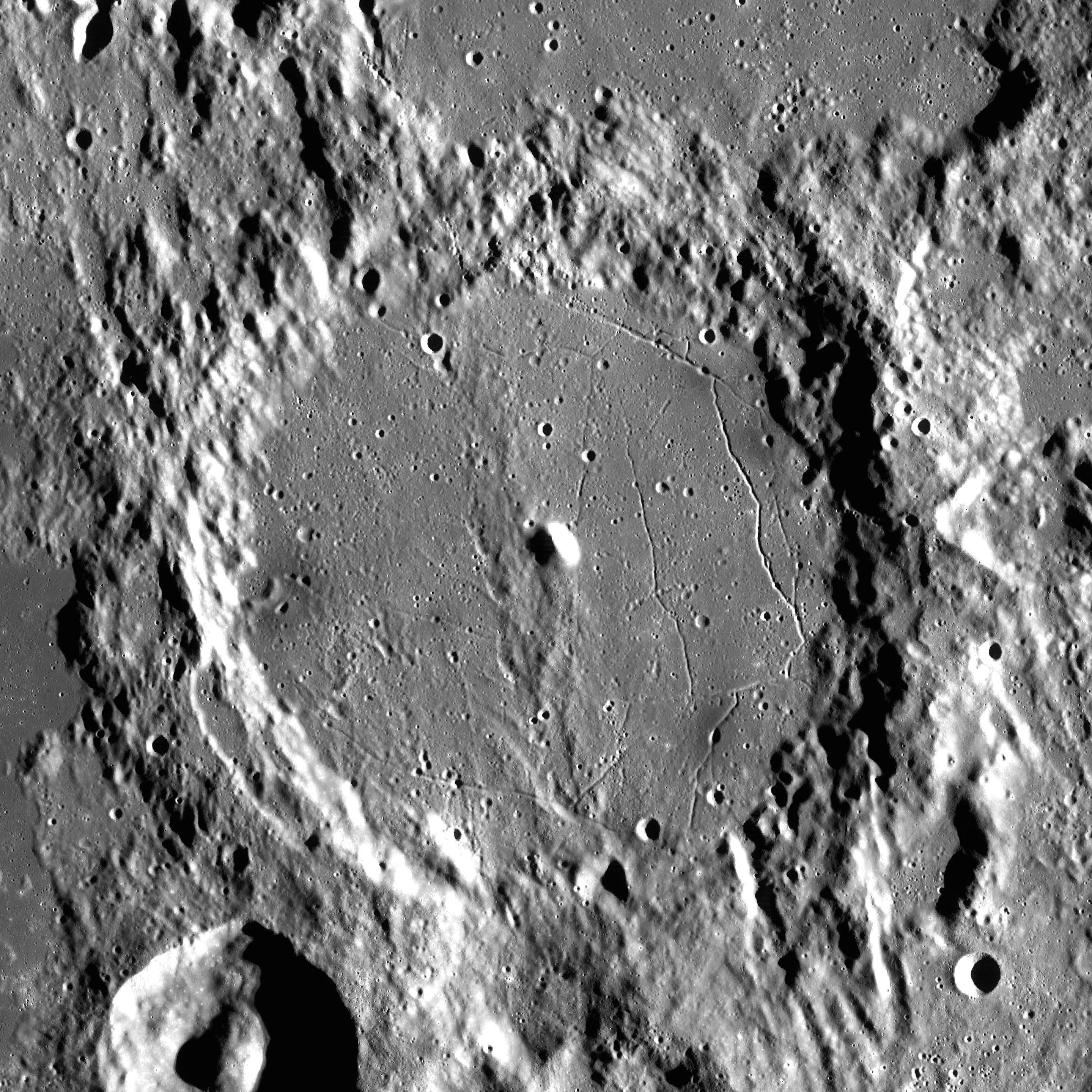
- LRO image
- Coordinates: 13.39°S 2.85°W
- Diameter: 110.54 km
- Depth: 2.7 km
- Colongitude: 4° at sunrise
- Formation: Pre-Nectarian
- Eponym: Alfonso X

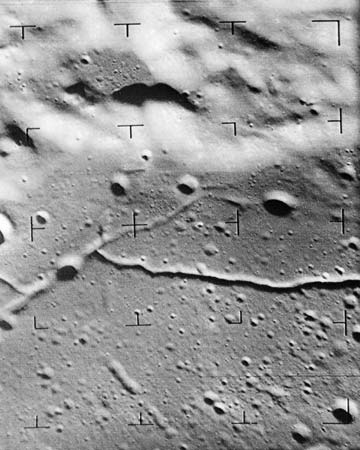
Ranger 9 image showing rilles on the floor of the crater

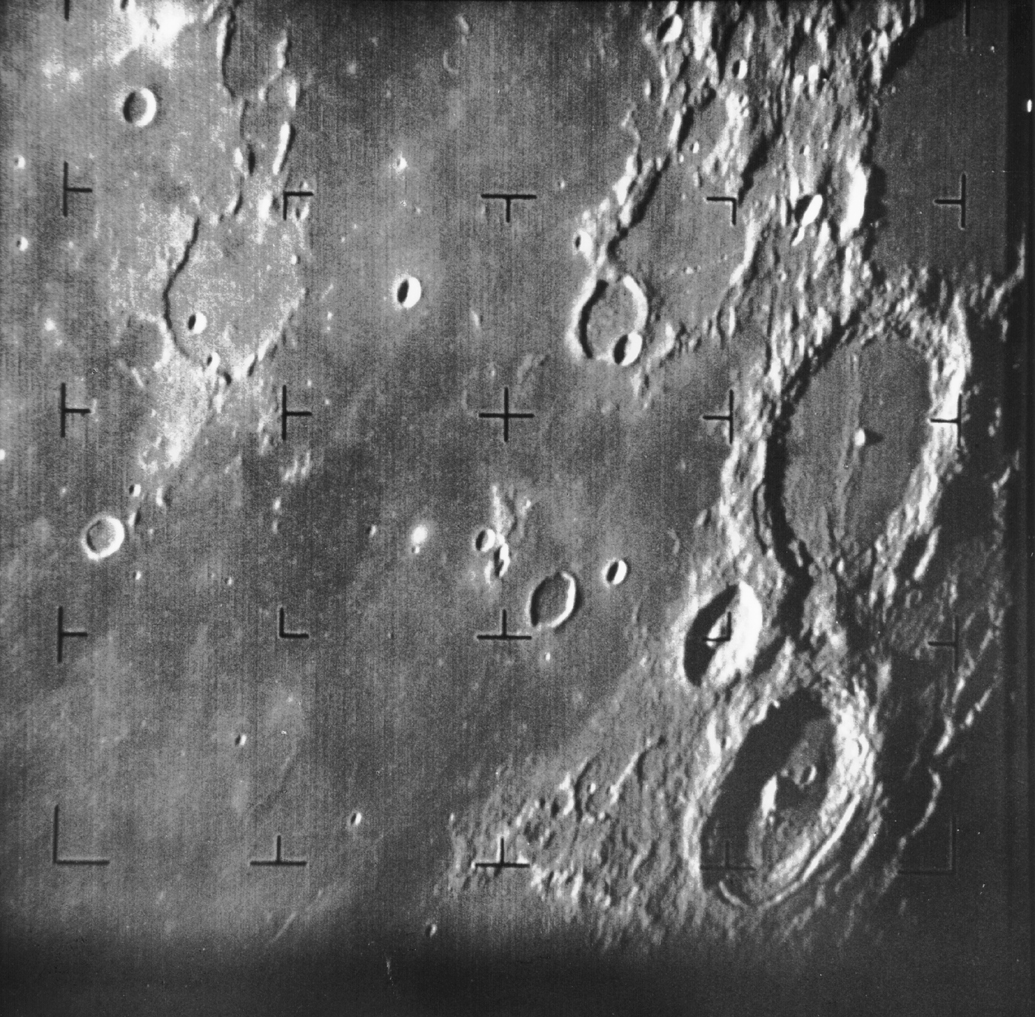
Alphonsus crater appears in the right half of this image taken by Ranger 7. NASA photo.

Alphonsus is an ancient impact crater on the Moon that dates from the pre-Nectarian era. (Older sources state that it is Nectarian in age.) It is located on the lunar highlands on the eastern end of Mare Nubium, west of the Imbrian Highlands, and slightly overlaps the crater Ptolemaeus to the north. To the southwest is the smaller Alpetragius. The crater name was approved by the IAU in 1935.

== Description ==
The surface of Alphonsus is broken and irregular along its boundary with Ptolemaeus. The outer walls are slightly distorted and possess a somewhat hexagonal form. T. W. Webb noted it "has a steep central peak", "about the height of Vesuvius".

A low ridge system of deposited ejecta bisects the crater floor, and includes the steep central peak designated Alphonsus Alpha (α). This pyramid-shaped formation rises to a height of 1.5 km above the interior surface. It is not volcanic in origin, but rather is made of anorthosite like the lunar highlands. The infrared spectrum of pure crystalline plagioclase has been identified on this peak.

The floor is fractured by an elaborate system of rilles and contains four or five smaller craters surrounded by a symmetric darker halo. These dark-halo craters are cinder cone-shaped and are believed by some to be volcanic in origin, although others think they were caused by impacts that excavated darker mare material from underneath the lighter lunar regolith.

== Exploration ==
The Ranger 9 probe impacted in Alphonsus, a short distance to the northeast of the central peak. Harold Urey said of a close-up photograph of Alphonsus:

The floor is covered with many craters of various sizes, some sharp and hence new, others less distinct and partly filled with fragmented material. The walls have fewer craters, and this probably means that slumping of the wall has filled them. Crevasses are evident, and evidence for slumping exists. The larger crater near the top is undoubtedly collisional in origin. Three craters are surrounded by dark halos and were produced by eruptions from the lunar interior. Exceptionally bright, sharp peaks can be seen on certain mountain tops.

== Apollo Landing Site ==
The dark-haloed craters along some of the rilles in the crater are thought to be volcanic vents, and during the Apollo program Alphonsus was considered as a possible landing site in order to possibly sample xenoliths of the lunar mantle from the vents. It was considered for Apollo 16 but the Descartes area was selected. It was one of the three final possible sites for Apollo 17, together with Gassendi crater and the Taurus-Littrow valley, but it was considered possibly "contaminated" with younger material from the nearby Imbrium basin.

== Transient lunar phenomena ==
Alphonsus is one of the sites noted for transient lunar phenomena, as glowing red-hued clouds have been reported emanating from the crater. On October 26, 1956, the lunar astronomer Dinsmore Alter noted some blurring of the rilles on the floor of Alphonsus in the photographs he took in violet light. The same blurring did not occur in the infrared photographs he took at the same time. However, few professional astronomers found this evidence of volcanic activity on the Moon very convincing.

One astronomer who was intrigued by Alter's observations was Nikolai A. Kozyrev, from the Soviet Union. In 1958 while Kozyrev was looking for volcanic phenomenon on the moon, he observed the formation of a mist-like cloud within Alphonsus. The spectrum of the area had been measured at this time, and displayed indications of carbon matter, possibly C_{2} gas. He believed this to be the result of volcanic or related activity. However no evidence for this phenomenon has been found from lunar missions, and the emission results have never been confirmed.

== Names ==
Alphonsus is named after King Alfonso X of Castile (known as "Alfonso the Wise"), who had an interest in astronomy. Like many of the craters on the Moon's near side, it was given its name by Giovanni Riccioli, whose 1651 nomenclature system has become standardized; Riccioli originally named it "Alphonsus Rex" ('King Alfonso'), but the 'Rex' was later dropped. Earlier lunar cartographers had given the feature different names. Michael van Langren's 1645 map calls it "Ludovici XIV, Reg. Fran.", after Louis XIV of France, and Johannes Hevelius called it "Mons Masicytus" after a range of mountains in Lycia.

== Interior craters ==
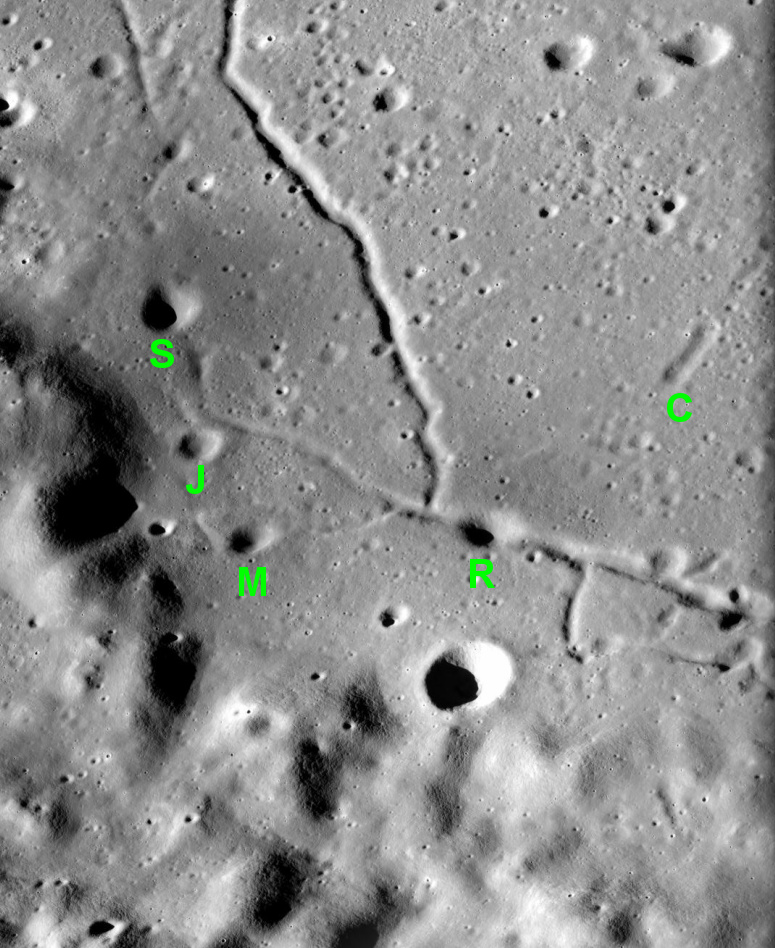
Oblique view of the five small named craters: C = Chang-Ngo, R = Ravi, M = Monira, J = Jose, S = Soraya. Facing south with sun illuminating from left. North on the photo is on the bottom

Five tiny craters in the northeastern part of Alphonsus' interior floor have been assigned names by the IAU. These are listed in the table below.

| Crater | Coordinates | Diameter | Name source |
|---|---|---|---|
| Chang-Ngo | 12.7°S 2.1°W | 3 km | Chinese goddess of the moon |
| José | 12.7°S 1.6°W | 2 km | Spanish masculine name |
| Monira | 12.6°S 1.7°W | 2 km | Arabic feminine name |
| Ravi | 12.5°S 1.9°W | 2.5 km | Indian masculine name |
| Soraya | 12.9°S 1.6°W | 2 km | Persian feminine name |

== Satellite craters ==
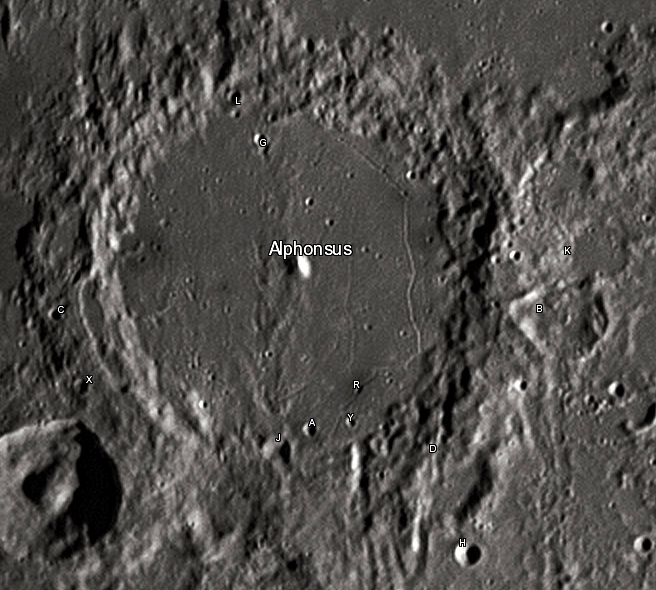
Alphonsus crater and its satellite craters taken from Earth in 2012 at the University of Hertfordshire's Bayfordbury Observatory with the telescopes Meade LX200 14" and Lumenera Skynyx 2-1

By convention these features are identified on lunar maps by placing the letter on the side of the crater midpoint that is closest to Alphonsus.

| Alphonsus | Latitude | Longitude | Diameter |
|---|---|---|---|
| A | 14.8° S | 2.3° W | 4 km |
| B | 13.2° S | 0.2° W | 24 km |
| C | 14.4° S | 4.8° W | 4 km |
| D | 15.1° S | 0.8° W | 23 km |
| G | 12.3° S | 3.3° W | 4 km |
| H | 15.6° S | 0.5° W | 8 km |
| J | 15.1° S | 2.5° W | 8 km |
| K | 12.5° S | 0.1° W | 20 km |
| L | 12.0° S | 3.7° W | 4 km |
| R | 14.4° S | 1.9° W | 3 km |
| X | 15.0° S | 4.4° W | 5 km |
| Y | 14.7° S | 1.8° W | 3 km |
