= Gresham College =

Educational institution in London, England

Coordinates: 51.5175°N 0.1098°W

- Coat of arms
- Motto: For the Love of Learning since 1597
- Established: 1597; 429 years ago (Note: 1596 Old Style in the Julian calendar used at the time, 1597 in the Gregorian calendar currently used.)
- Endowment: £1,617,929 (2022)
- Chair of Council: Professor Robert Allison
- Academic staff: 10 professorships
- Location: Holborn, London, United Kingdom
- Campus: Urban
- Colours
- Website: Official website

Gresham College is an institution of higher learning located at Barnard's Inn Hall off Holborn in Central London, England that does not accept students or award degrees. It was founded in 1597 under the will of Sir Thomas Gresham, and hosts over 140 free public lectures every year. Since 2001, all lectures have been made available online. As of December 2025, the Provost is Professor Jane Shaw.

== History ==
=== First four centuries ===
Sir Thomas Gresham, founder of the Royal Exchange, left his estate jointly to the City of London Corporation and the Mercers' Company, which today support the college through the Joint Grand Gresham Committee under the presidency of the Lord Mayor of London. Gresham's will provided for the setting up of the college – in Gresham's mansion in Bishopsgate, on the site now occupied by Tower 42, the former NatWest Tower – and endowed it with the rental income from shops sited around the Royal Exchange.

The early success of the college led to the incorporation of the Royal Society in 1660, which pursued its activities at the college in Bishopsgate before moving to its own premises in Crane Court in 1710. Gresham College was mentioned "particularly and academically" alongside the Inns of Court and other colleges in London as part of a figurative University of London in Sir George Buck's tract, The Third Universitie of England: Or a Treatise of the Foundations of all the Colledges, Auncient Schooles of Priviledge, and of Houses of Learning, and Liberall Arts, within and about the Most Famous Cittie of London, published in 1615 as an appendix to John Stow's Annales. The 17th century saw various proposals for a third university in England, including one in London, taking in Gresham College.

The college remained in Gresham's mansion in Bishopsgate until 1768, and moved about London thereafter until the construction in 1842 of its own buildings in Gresham Street EC2. Gresham College did not become part of the University of London on the founding of the university in the 19th century, although a close association between the college and the university persisted for many years. In 1892 the foundation of a 'Gresham University' in London was proposed in Parliament, intended to be a "Teaching University worthy of this Metropolis." This was opposed by the Victoria University on the grounds that its medical faculty would dominate medical teaching in the country to the detriment of Manchester. The proposed university may just have borrowed the name from the college.

=== 21st century ===
Since 1991, the college has operated at Barnard's Inn Hall, Holborn EC1. Since 2000, the college regularly invites visiting speakers to deliver lectures on topics outside its usual range, and it also hosts occasional seminars and conferences. The college provides over 140 lectures a year, all open to the public free of charge.

Since 2001, the college has been recording its lectures and releasing them online in what is now an archive of over 2,000 lectures. Since 2007, lectures have also been available through YouTube, with 54 million views of 3,000 videos and 282,000 subscribers as of August 2024.

Annual lectures series of particular note hosted by the college include: the Gresham Special Lecture, the Annual Lord Mayor's Event, and the Gray's Inn Reading.

The college is a registered charity under English law.

== Professors ==
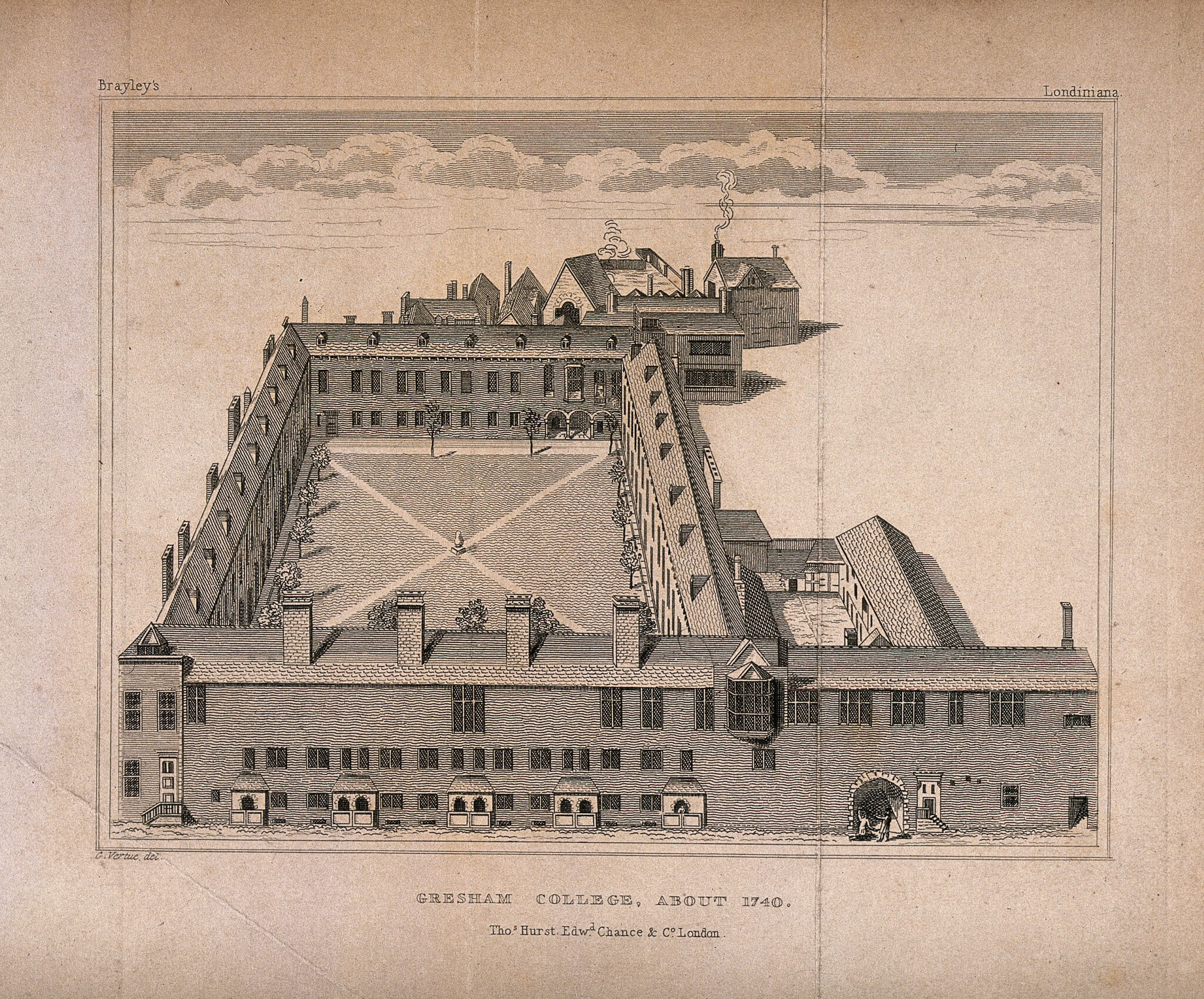
1828 engraving of Gresham College after a 1740 engraving by George Vertue

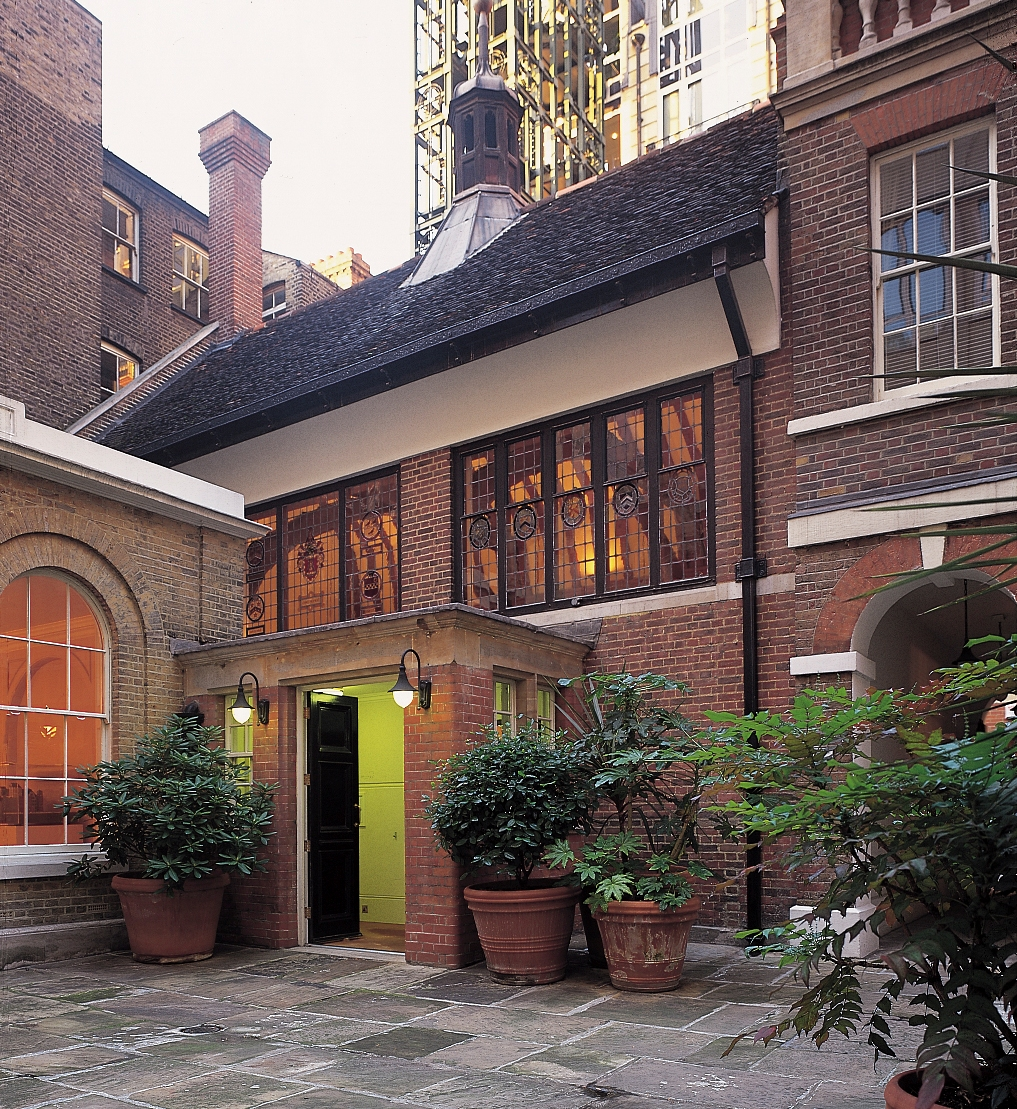
Barnard's Inn Hall, the current home of Gresham College

The seven original Gresham College professorships that date back to the origins of the college are:

- Astronomy
- Divinity
- Geometry
- Law
- Music
- Physic
- Rhetoric

These original endowed chairs reflect the curriculum of the medieval university (the trivium and quadrivium); but as a place for the public and frequent voicing of new ideas, the college played an important role in the Enlightenment and in the formation of the Royal Society. Early distinguished Gresham College professors included Christopher Wren, who lectured on astronomy in the 17th century, and Robert Hooke, who was Professor of Geometry from 1665 until 1704.

The geometrician is to read as followeth, every Trinity term arithmetique, in Michaelmas and Hilary terms theoretical geometry, in Easter term practical geometry. The astronomy reader is to read in his solemn lectures, first the principles of the sphere, and the theory of the planets, and the use of the astrolabe and the staff, and other common instruments for the capacity of mariners.

The professors received £50 a year, and the duties of their positions were specified tightly.

Today three further professorships have been added:

- Commerce, established in 1985.
- Environment, established in 2014.
- Information Technology, established in 2015.

The professors generally hold their positions for three years, extendable for a fourth year, and give six lectures a year. There are also regular visiting professors appointed to give series of lectures at the College, and many single-lecture speakers.

== Gresham Special Lecture series ==
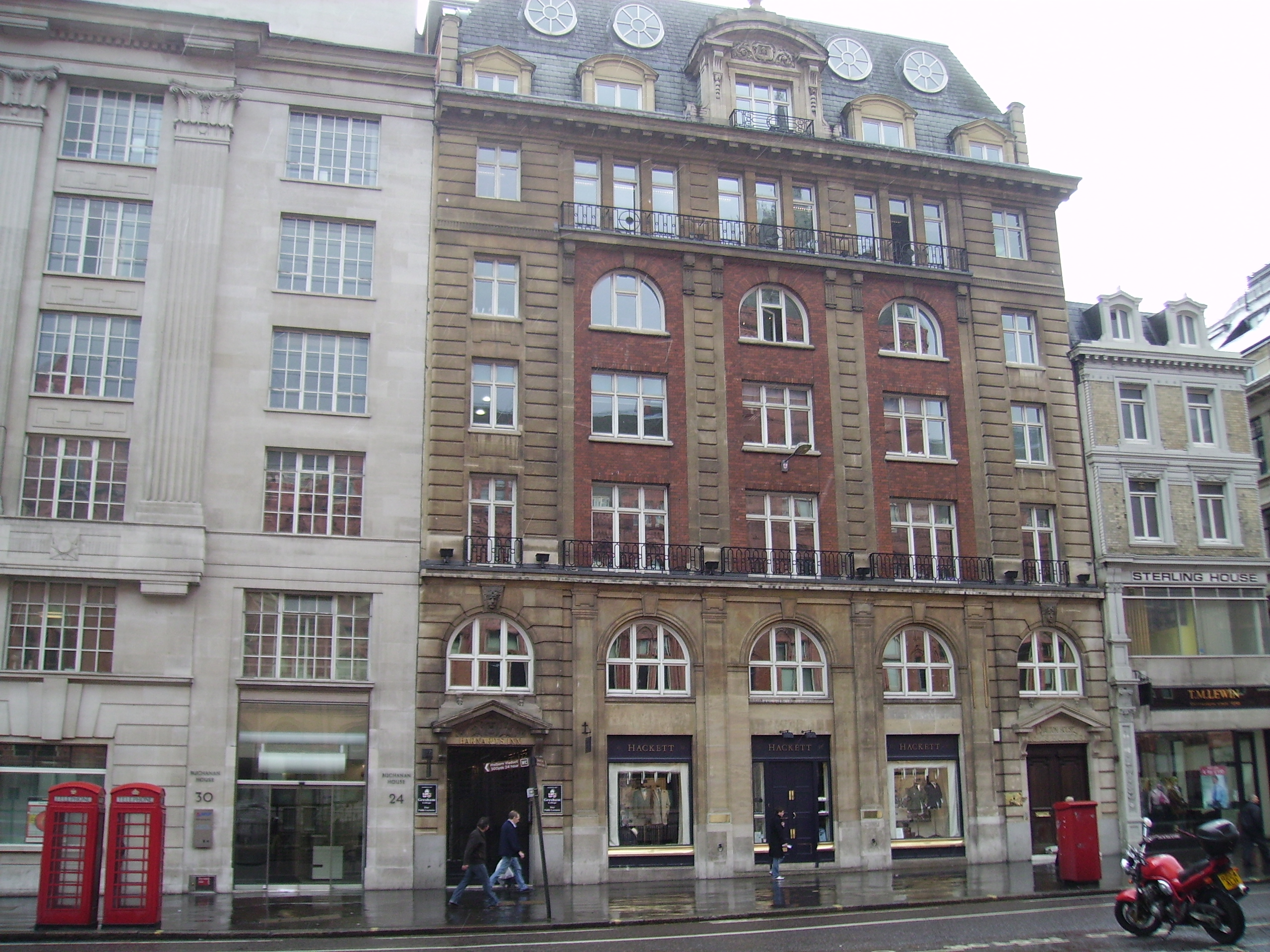
Frontage of Barnard's Inn Buildings

The Gresham Special Lecture – now called The Sir Thomas Gresham Annual Lecture – originated in 1983 as a free public lecture delivered by a prominent speaker. It was devised as a focus-point among the many free public lectures offered every year.

- 2026: Professor Jim Al-Khalili – 'On the Nature of Time According to Modern Physics'.
- 2025: Professor Chris Whitty – 'The Future of Health'.
- 2024: Bernadine Evaristo – 'The Stories We Make Up & The Stories That Make Us'.
- 2023: Rory Stewart – 'Populism, Aristotle and Hope'.
- 2022: Sir Roger Penrose – 'The Journey from Black-Hole Singularities to a Cyclic Cosmology'.
- 2021: Sir Nicholas Kenyon – 'The Barbican Centre at 40 – Past, Present and Future'
- 2020: No lecture
- 2019: Dr John Guy – 'Sir Thomas Gresham 1519–2019'
- 2018: Dame Julia Slingo FRS – 'Climate Change: A Defining Challenge for the 21st Century'
- 2017: Alan Rusbridger – 'A World Without News?'
- 2016: The Rt Hon the Baroness Blackstone – 'Universities: Some Policy Dilemmas'
- 2015: Dame Barbara Stocking DBE – 'Women's Careers: From Oxfam to a Cambridge College'
- 2014: Stephen Hodder MBE – 'Continuity and Development in Architecture'
- 2013: Sir Richard Peter Lambert – 'The UK and the New Face of Europe'
- 2012: The Rt Hon John Bercow – 'Parliament and the Public: Strangers or Friends?'
- 2011: Sir Adam Roberts – 'Reinventing the Wheel: The cost of neglecting international history'
- 2010: Lord Phillips of Worth Matravers – 'The Challenges of the New Supreme Court'
- 2009: Niall Ferguson – 'The Ascent of money: An evolutionary approach to financial history'
- 2008: The Lord Archbishop of Canterbury, Rowan Williams – 'Early Christianity & Today: Some shared questions'
- 2007: Sir Roy Strong – 'The Beauty of Holiness and its Perils (or what is to happen to 10,000 parish churches?)'
- 2006: Baroness Kennedy of The Shaws – 'Walking the Line: Preserving liberty in times of insecurity'
- 2005: Lord Winston – 'Should we trust the scientists?'
- 2004: Lord Rees of Ludlow – 'Science in a Complex World: Wonders, Prospects and Threats'
- 2003: Sir Harold Kroto – 'I think, therefore I am – a scientist'
- 2002: M. S. Swaminathan – 'Towards Freedom from Hunger: A Global Food for Sustainable Development Initiative'
- 2001: Dr Charles Saumarez Smith – 'Commerce and Culture in the Late Twentieth Century'
- 2000: Hans Küng – 'A Global Ethics – A Challenge for the New Millennium'
- 1999: Baroness Williams of Crosby – 'Snakes and Ladders: A reflection on a post-war political life'
- 1998: Sir Adrian Cadbury – 'The Future for Governance: The rules of the game'
- 1997: Dr Ian Archer – 'Thomas Gresham's London'
- 1996: Sir Peter Middleton – 'Banking Today'
- 1995: Sir Michael Howard – 'Reflections on the 50th Anniversary of VE Day'
- 1993: Howard Davies – 'The City and Manufacturing Industry'
- 1992: Baron Hermann von Richthofen – 'A United Germany in the New Europe'
- 1991: Revd. Dr J. Polkinghorne – 'Science and Theology: Traffic across the frontier'
- 1989: Sir Ralf Dahrendorf – 'The Decline of Socialism'
- 1988: The Most Reverend Kirill Archbishop of Smolensk – 'Russian Orthodox Church Life Today: The Second Millennium'
- 1987: Sir George Porter – 'Popular and Unpopular Science'
- 1985: The Rt Hon The Lord Young of Graffham – 'The Rise and Fall of the Entrepreneur'
- 1984: Lord Blake – 'Monarchy'
- 1983: Lord Scarman – 'Human Rights and the Democratic Process'

== See also ==
- Gresham College and the formation of the Royal Society
- Third-oldest university in England debate
- Gresham's School
- Scholars and Literati at the Gresham College (1597–1800), Repertorium Eruditorum Totius Europae – RETE
