= Elger (crater) =

Lunar impact crater

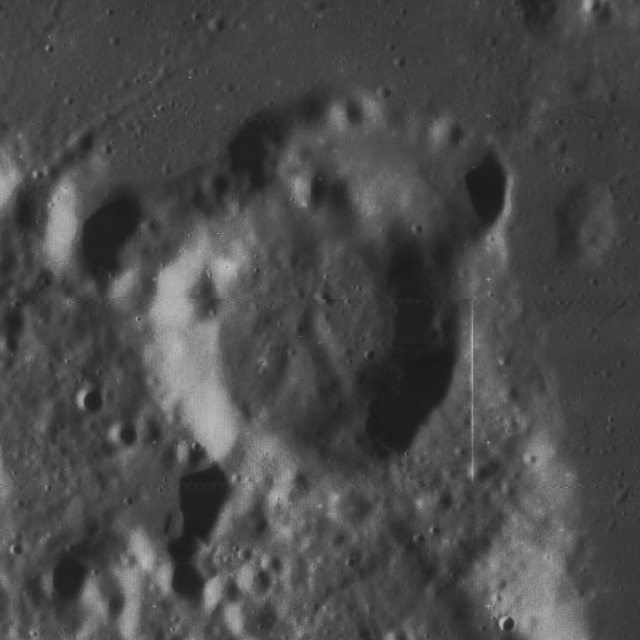
- Lunar Orbiter 4 image
- Coordinates: 35.3°S 29.8°W
- Diameter: 21.51 km (13.37 mi)
- Depth: 1.3 km (0.81 mi)
- Colongitude: 30° at sunrise
- Eponym: T. Gwyn Elger

Elger is a lunar impact crater that lies along the southern edge of Palus Epidemiarum, the Marsh of Epidemics, in the southwest part of the Moon's near side. To the northeast is the flooded crater Capuanus, and farther to the northwest is Ramsden.

The rim of this formation is rough and somewhat eroded formation, with a break and an outward bulge along the northern end, while a ridge intrudes into the southern rim. The interior has been resurfaced by lava, although the albedo of the floor is not quite as low as the lunar mare surface to the north.

The crater is named after British astronomer Thomas Gwyn Elger (1836-1897). His name was included with the lunar nomenclature of Johann Nepomuk Krieger in 1912. Its designation was formally adopted by the International Astronomical Union in 1935.

== Satellite craters ==
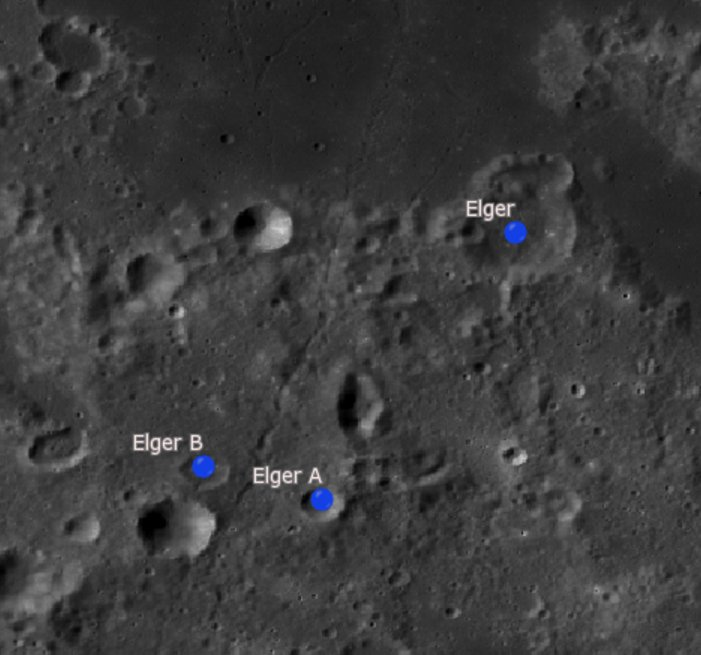
Elger and its satellite craters

By convention these features are identified on lunar maps by placing the letter on the side of the crater midpoint that is closest to Elger.

Elger	Latitude	Longitude	Diameter
A	37.3° S	31.2° W	8 km
B	37.1° S	32.0° W	8 km
