= Dunthorne =

Dunthorne may refer to:

- Richard Dunthorne, English astronomer and surveyor
- Dunthorne (crater)
