= Bullialdus =

Bullialdus may refer to:

- Bullialdus (crater), a lunar impact crater
- Ismaël Bullialdus (1605-1694), French astronomer
