= Campanus =

Campanus can refer to:

- Giovanni Antonio Campani called Campanus (1427–1477), Italian humanist
- Campanus of Novara (1220–1296), Italian astrologer, astronomer, and mathematician; also:
  - Campanus (crater), a lunar crater named for him
  - the astrological house system named after him; see House (astrology)#Campanus
- Johannes Vodnianus Campanus (1572–1622), Czech humanist, composer, pedagogue, poet, and dramatist
- Johann Campanus (fl. 1530) Belgian Anabaptist religious reformer
- Campania, a region of Italy

== See also ==
- John Campanius (1601–1683), Swedish Lutheran clergyman
