= Kies (crater) =

Crater on the Moon

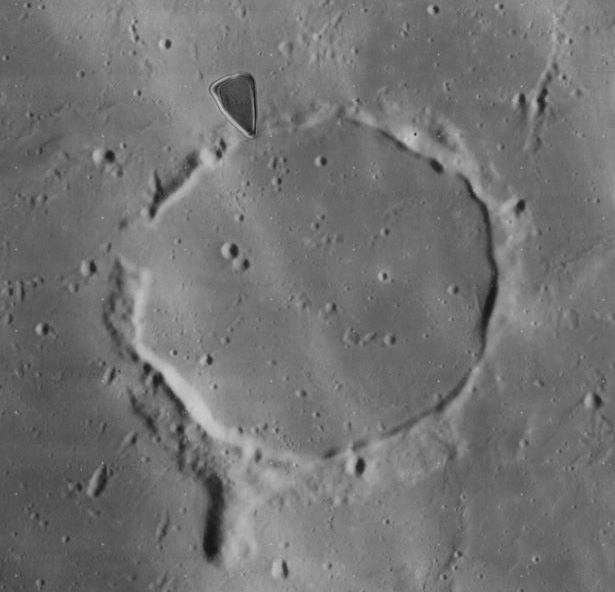
- Lunar Orbiter 4 image (Dark triangle at upper rim is blemish on original photo)
- Coordinates: 26.3°S 22.5°W
- Diameter: 44 km
- Depth: 0.4 km
- Colongitude: 327° at sunrise
- Eponym: Johann Kies

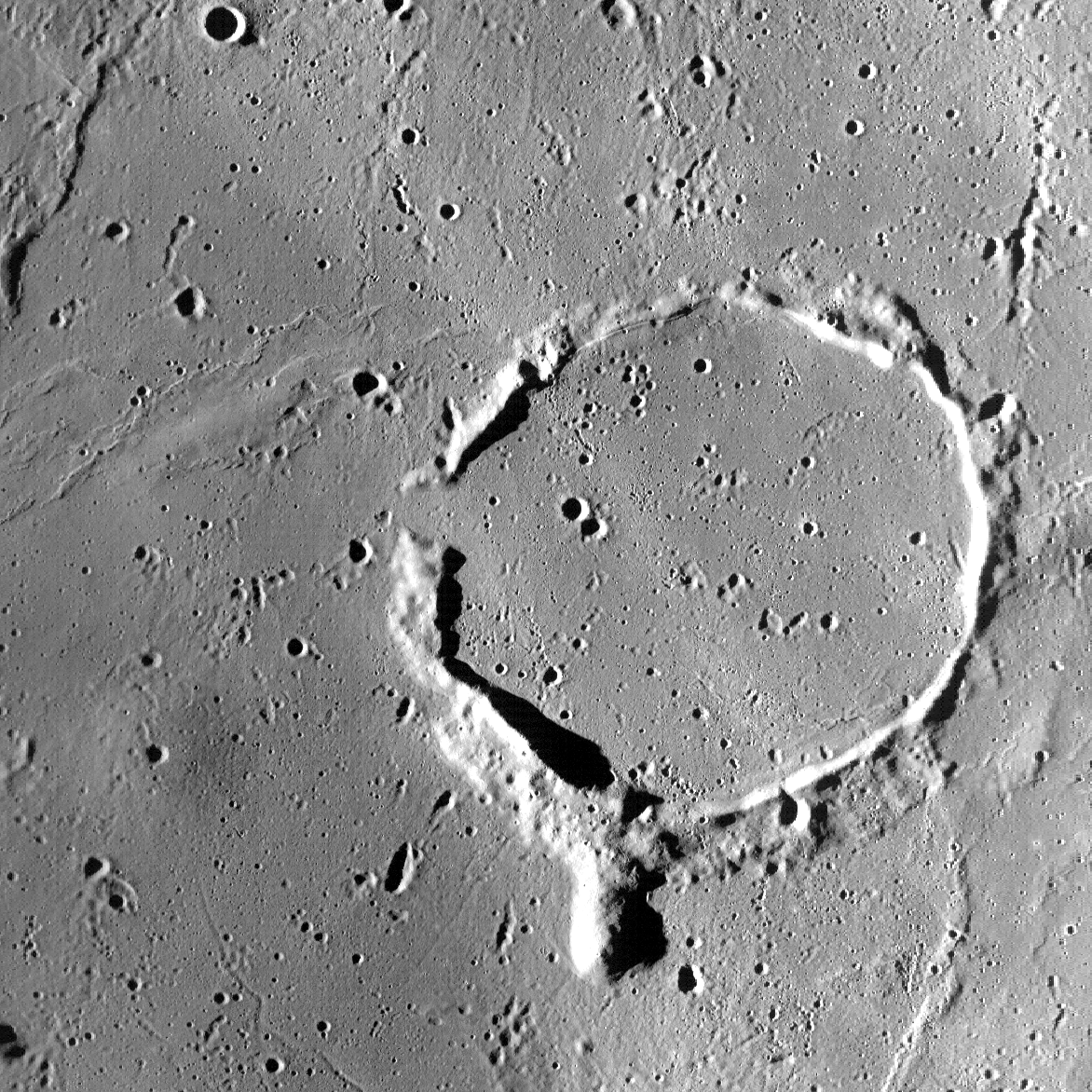
LRO image of Kies and Kies Pi (lower left), a small lunar dome

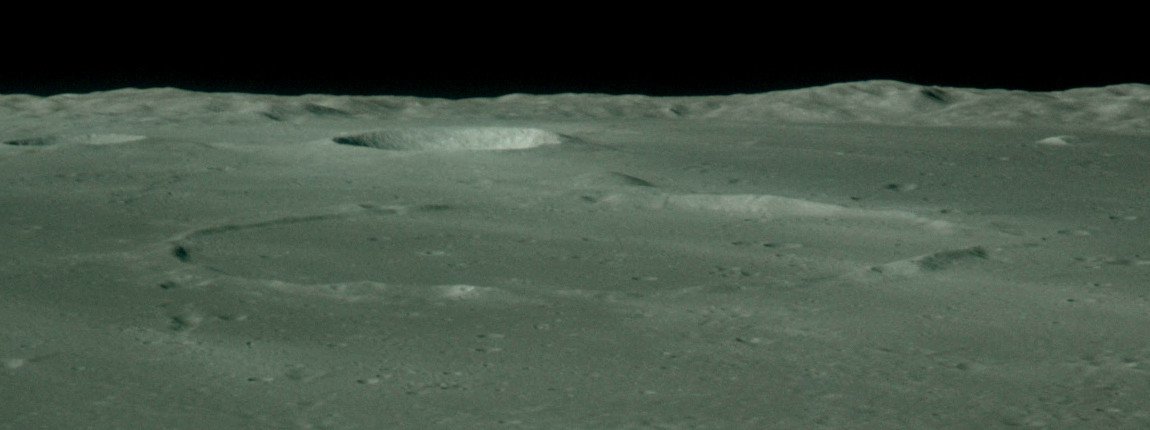
Oblique view from Apollo 16

Kies is the remnant of a lunar impact crater that has been flooded by basaltic lava, leaving only a remnant of the outer rim. It was named after German mathematician and astronomer Johann Kies. It is located in the Mare Nubium almost due south of the crater Bullialdus. Northwest of Kies is König. To the south-southwest lies a lunar dome structure designated Kies Pi (π). It has a small crater at the top and is most likely volcanic in origin.

The rim of Kies has numerous gaps and forms a series of ridges in a ring-shaped formation. The most intact rim structures lie in the south and northeast sections of the wall. A low promontory ridge is attached to the southern end of the rim, pointing southwards.

Rays from Tycho, located far to the southeast, cross Kies and the surrounding mare.

== Bright satellite craters Kies A and Kies E ==
South of Kies, the couple of bright satellite craters Kies A and Kies E are both eye-catchers during and after full moon. Their brightness is also noticeable on the photographic version of chart LAC 94 (page 188) in The Clementine Atlas of the Moon (Ben Bussey / Paul D. Spudis). As seen through small telescopes, the location of both Kies A and Kies E on the western part of the double northwestern ejectaray from Tycho gives the impression as if both bright craters form a knot of high albedo in this ray. Another satellite crater which also looks like a bright knot in the ray is Cichus B (LAC 111).

== Rand McNally's Golubiz Cluster ==
West-southwest of Kies and east-northeast of Campanus, a small group of hills and hillocks is called Golubiz Cluster on the greenish colored moonmap from Rand McNally. This name was not accepted by the International Astronomical Union (IAU).

== Satellite craters ==
By convention these features are identified on lunar maps by placing the letter on the side of the crater midpoint that is closest to Kies.

Kies	Latitude	Longitude	Diameter
A	28.3° S	22.7° W	16 km
B	28.7° S	21.9° W	9 km
C	26.0° S	26.1° W	5 km
D	24.9° S	18.5° W	6 km
E	28.7° S	22.7° W	6 km

== Bibliography ==
- Andersson, L. E.; Whitaker, E. A. (1982). NASA Catalogue of Lunar Nomenclature. NASA RP-1097.
- Bussey, B.; Spudis, P. (2004). The Clementine Atlas of the Moon. New York: Cambridge University Press. ISBN 978-0-521-81528-4.
- Cocks, Elijah E.; Cocks, Josiah C. (1995). Who's Who on the Moon: A Biographical Dictionary of Lunar Nomenclature. Tudor Publishers. ISBN 978-0-936389-27-1.
- McDowell, Jonathan (July 15, 2007). "Lunar Nomenclature". host.planet4589.org. Jonathan's Space Report. Archived from the original on 2012-02-08.
- Menzel, D. H.; Minnaert, M.; Levin, B.; Dollfus, A.; Bell, B. (1971). "Report on Lunar Nomenclature by the Working Group of Commission 17 of the IAU". Space Science Reviews. 12 (2): 136–186. Bibcode:1971SSRv...12..136M. doi:10.1007/BF00171763. S2CID 122125855.
- Moore, Patrick (2001). On the Moon. Sterling Publishing Co. ISBN 978-0-304-35469-6.
- Price, Fred W. (1988). The Moon Observer's Handbook. Cambridge University Press. ISBN 978-0-521-33500-3.
- Rükl, Antonín (1990). Atlas of the Moon. Kalmbach Books. ISBN 978-0-913135-17-4.
- Webb, Rev. T. W. (1962). Celestial Objects for Common Telescopes (6th revised ed.). Dover. ISBN 978-0-486-20917-3.
- Whitaker, Ewen A. (1999). Mapping and Naming the Moon. Cambridge University Press. ISBN 978-0-521-62248-6.
- Wlasuk, Peter T. (2000). Observing the Moon. Springer. ISBN 978-1-85233-193-1.
