= Marth (lunar crater) =

Crater on the Moon

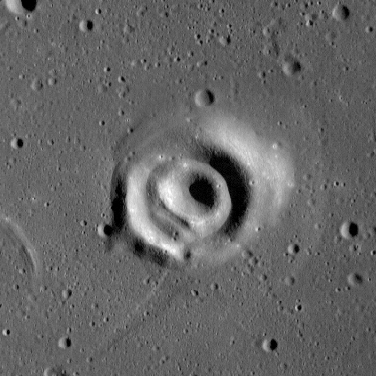
- LRO image
- Coordinates: 31.1°S 29.3°W
- Diameter: 7 km
- Depth: Unknown
- Colongitude: 29° at sunrise
- Eponym: Albert Marth

Marth is a small lunar impact crater located in the northwest part of the Palus Epidemiarum. It was named after German astronomer Albert Marth. To the northwest is the crater Dunthorne, and to the southwest lies Ramsden. This feature lies in a system of rilles named the Rimae Ramsden, and an interrupted branch passes only a few kilometers to the south of the rim.

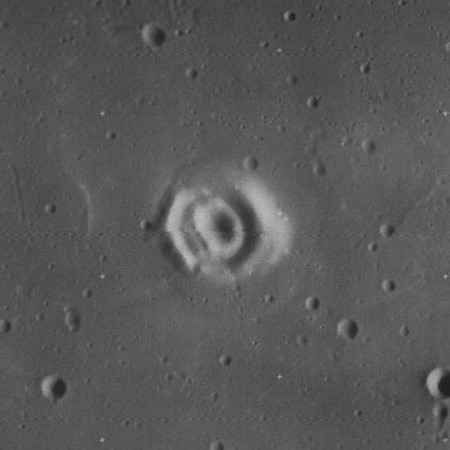
Lunar Orbiter 4 image

Marth is unusual for having a double rim, with a smaller inner crater concentric to the outer rim. The smaller crater is located near the center of the larger rim, giving the feature a bullseye appearance.

== Satellite craters ==
By convention these features are identified on lunar maps by placing the letter on the side of the crater midpoint that is closest to Marth.

Marth	Latitude	Longitude	Diameter
K	29.9° S	28.7° W	3 km

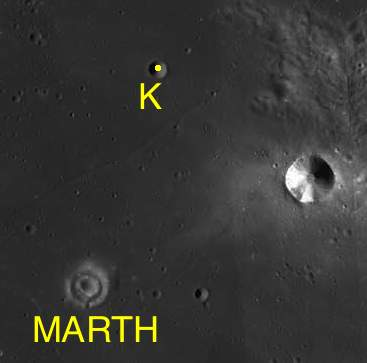
Marth and its satellite crater Marth K
