= Francesco Capuano Di Manfredonia =

Italian astronomer, professor and member of the clergy

Francesco Capuano Di Manfredonia (flourished 15th century) was an Italian astronomer, professor, and member of the clergy. Up until the 1880s (at the earliest) there was not a lot known about Capuano, and the little that was known was derived directly from his printed works.

Capuano was born in Manfredonia, Italy, likely in the first half of the fifteenth century. He was known for being a mathematician. He also published works as professor of physical and mathematical sciences and astronomy at Padua, Republic of Venice, where he produced a commentary on Georg von Peuerbach's Theoricae planetarium in August of 1495. This commentary was dedicated to Ferdinand II of Naples. He wrote an influential commentary on the work Tractatus de Sphaera by Johannes de Sacrobosco, which was printed in late 1499 in Venice, Italy. This work was dedicated to Lorenzo Donato (Donà), and reprinted six times, up to 1531, some of which are under the name Giovanni Battista. Capuano is most regarded for his work on Tractatus de Sphaera, which is usually published with other texts the subject by various authors. This allows Capuano's commentary to be read in conjunction with works of a different nature.

It is commonly held that Capuano died in Naples, Italy around 1490, but records, such as his publication on Peuerbach's Theoricae planetarium and documents preserved in the Padua archives, show that he was very much alive throughout the early to mid 1500s. Writings by Paolo Sambin under the title Professori di astronomia e matematica a Padova nell’ultimo decennio del Quattrocento describe events from Capuano's life after his alleged death date. Sambin sourced this material from documents preserved in the Padua archives. In 1475, Capuano studied astronomy and philosophy at the University of Padua. Astronomy and philosophy were known as the natural and mathematical sciences around this time. A few years later, on 6 November 1494, Francesco Capuano submitted a request alongside another Apulian scholar, Girolamo Palmieri da Ostuni, in which they asked for a reduction in fees for their examination and proclamation ceremony. They requested that at least one of their fees be waived due to both their poverty and the war that was going on at the time. Their request was granted, and on 12 November 1494, Capuano passed his exam in the arts and medicine. He was honoured with 'doctoral insignia' at his graduation ceremony on 15 November 1494.

He became known as Giovanni Battista following his entrance into the ranks of the Canons Regular of the Lateran (CRL). Subsequently, he became a bishop after joining the congregation. Another alias associated with Capuano is Iohannes Baptista Capuanus Sipontinus, de Manfredonia. Although the exact timeline remains uncertain, it is speculated that Capuano began his religious life between 1508 and 1518, based on the dedications of his written works. After becoming a clergyman, Capuano rededicated his commentary on Tractatus de Sphaera to his fellow members of the CRL.

On Giovanni Battista Riccioli's 17th-century lunar map, a lunar impact crater on the southern edge of the Palus Epidemiarum was named Capuanus after Francesco Capuano.
