= Ramsden (crater) =

Crater on the Moon

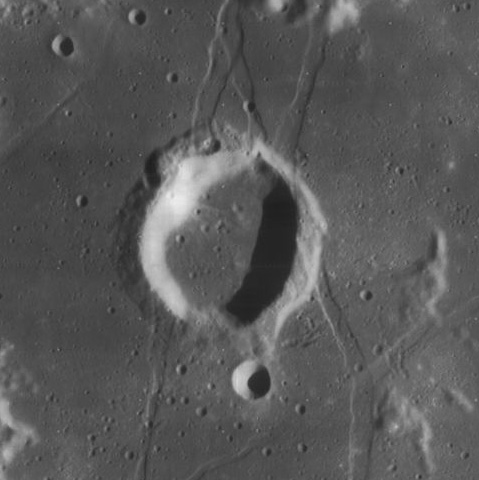
- Lunar Orbiter 4 image
- Coordinates: 32.9°S 31.8°W
- Diameter: 25 km
- Depth: 1.9 km
- Colongitude: 31° at sunrise
- Eponym: Jesse Ramsden

Ramsden is a lunar impact crater located on the western stretch of the Palus Epidemiarum. It was named after British instrument maker Jesse Ramsden. As T. W. Webb notes, it "is surrounded by a very fine system of branches and intersecting clefts". To the east-southeast is the crater Capuanus, and to the north lies Dunthorne.

This impact is dated to the Imbrian period of the Moon's geological history. The floor of the crater has been flooded with lava, and contains several small impact craters. The rim is somewhat oval and irregular in outline, with depressions at the north and south walls. It has a slight rampart, but lacks terraces, a central peak, or a ray system.

The crater lies directly across a rille system named the Rimae Ramsden. These span an area 130 kilometers across, sprawling over the western Palus Epidemiarum. A branch reaches northwest to the Mare Nubium, passing between the craters Campanus and Mercator.

== Ramsden during full moon ==
A bright unnamed craterlet on the western section of Ramsden's elevated rim shows this rather unique combination as a diamond ring effect. The brightness of the craterlet at Ramsden's rim, against the dark background of Palus Epidemiarum, is also noticeable on the photographic version of chart LAC 111 (page 222) in The Clementine Atlas of the Moon (Ben Bussey / Paul D. Spudis).

== Satellite craters ==
By convention these features are identified on lunar maps by placing the letter on the side of the crater midpoint that is closest to Ramsden.

Ramsden	Latitude	Longitude	Diameter
A	33.4° S	31.3° W	5 km
G	35.3° S	31.6° W	11 km
H	35.7° S	32.4° W	11 km
