= Dunthorne (crater) =

Lunar impact crater

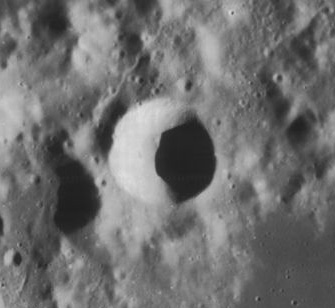
- Lunar Orbiter 4 image
- Coordinates: 30.1°S 31.6°W
- Diameter: 15.12 km (9.40 mi)
- Depth: 2.8 km (1.7 mi)
- Colongitude: 32° at sunrise
- Eponym: Richard Dunthorne

Dunthorne is a small lunar impact crater that is located to the northwest of the small lunar mare called Palus Epidemiarum, in the southwest part of the Moon's near side. It lies to the southwest of the crater Campanus, and east of Vitello. Due south is Ramsden crater.

This crater is roughly circular and bowl-shaped, with an interior that has a higher albedo than the surrounding terrain. It lies in a region that has a number of rille systems, with the Rimae Hippalus to the northwest, and the Rimae Ramsden to the south and east.

This formation is named after the British astronomer Richard Dunthorne (1711-1775). His name was introduced into lunar nomenclature by Johann Krieger and Rudolf König in 1912. Its designation was officially adopted by the International Astronomical Union in 1935.

== Dunthorne during and after full moon ==
Because crater Dunthorne has a much higher albedo than Mare Humorum to the northwest, Palus Epidemiarum to the southeast, and Mare Nubium to the northeast, it is an eye-catcher during and after full moon. Its brightness is also noticeable on the photographic version of chart LAC 93 (page 186) in The Clementine Atlas of the Moon (Ben Bussey / Paul D. Spudis).

== Satellite craters ==
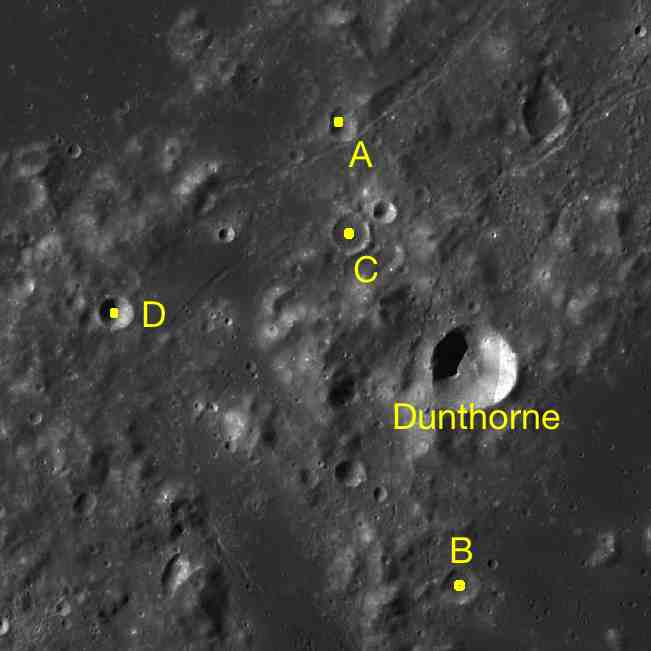
Dunthorne and its satellite craters

By convention these features are identified on lunar maps by placing the letter on the side of the crater midpoint that is closest to Dunthorne.

| Dunthorne | Latitude | Longitude | Diameter |
|---|---|---|---|
| A | 28.8° S | 32.6° W | 6 km |
| B | 31.4° S | 31.6° W | 7 km |
| C | 29.4° S | 32.5° W | 7 km |
| D | 30.0° S | 34.0° W | 6 km |
