= Thomas Gwyn Elger =

British selenographer

- Born: 27 October 1836; Bedford
- Died: 9 January 1897 (aged 60)
- Education: Bedford School, University College London
- Scientific career
- Fields: Selenography

Thomas Gwyn Empy Elger FRAS (27 October 1836 – 9 January 1897) was a British selenographer and one of the preeminent lunar observers of the Victorian age, best known for his lunar map, which was regarded as one of the best available until the 1960s. He was the first director of the Lunar Section of the British Astronomical Association (BAA), and is remembered by the lunar crater Elger.

== Biography ==
Thomas Elger was born on 27 October 1836 in Bedford, where his family had been established for several generations, and educated at Bedford School. His father Thomas Gwyn Elger (1794 – 1841) was an architect and builder. Grandfather, father and son engaged in town politics, and all held the post of mayor.

Elger studied at University College London and adopted the profession of a civil engineer. He was engaged in several important works, including the Metropolitan Railway and the Severn Valley Railway. However, his surveys for railway construction in Holstein were put to a stop by the war with Prussia and Austria in 1864.

Soon afterwards he relinquished the active pursuit of his profession and devoted himself to scientific studies. He had developed a strong taste for astronomy already at an early age and erected his first observatory in Bedford.

Elger observed with an 8.5-inch reflector. His sketches from 1884 to 1896 are now in the possession of the BAA. He is best known as a careful and indefatigable selenographer, and for this work his artistic skill eminently qualified him.

He is most remembered for his book The Moon: A full Description and Map of its Principal Physical Features. Published in 1895, its maps are still highly regarded by lunar observers due to their uncluttered nature.

The visual brightness of lunar features is expressed in the Elger's Lunar Albedo Scale. This scale had been established in 1791 by the German astronomer Johann Hieronymus Schröter and popularized by Elger.

Elger was a member of several astronomical associations, and he was elected as a Fellow of the Royal Astronomical Society on 10 February 1871. He was a founding member of the short-lived Selenographical Society, in 1878, President of the Liverpool Astronomical Society, and a founding member of the British Astronomical Association, in 1890, becoming the first director of its Lunar Section. He was appointed an associate of the Astronomical Society of Wales, a form of honorary membership. Besides his astronomical work, he was an ardent archaeologist and founded the Bedfordshire Natural History Society and Field Club.

Thomas Gwyn Elger died on 9 January 1897, aged 60, and the lunar crater Elger was named in his honour in 1912.
