= König (crater) =

Crater on the Moon

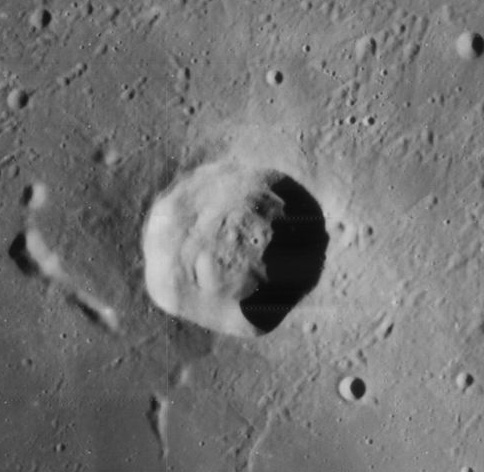
- Lunar Orbiter 4 image depicting the crater and its satellite crater König A located to the southeast
- Coordinates: 24.1°S 24.6°W
- Diameter: 23 km
- Depth: 2.50 km (1.55 mi)
- Colongitude: 25° at sunrise
- Eponym: Rudolf König

König is a lunar impact crater on the southwest Mare Nubium. It was named after Austrian mathematician and astronomer Rudolf König. It lies to the southwest of the prominent crater Bullialdus, and northwest of the flooded Kies. The rim of König is somewhat polygonal in outline, with a small outward bulge to the south and only a slight outer rampart. The crater interior is rough and irregular, with a negligible central peak. The material along the inner sides has slumped to the floor forming a ring of debris around the small central floor.

== Satellite craters ==
By convention these features are identified on lunar maps by placing the letter on the side of the crater midpoint that is closest to König.

König	Latitude	Longitude	Diameter
A	24.7° S	24.0° W	3 km
