= Weiss (crater) =

Lunar impact crater

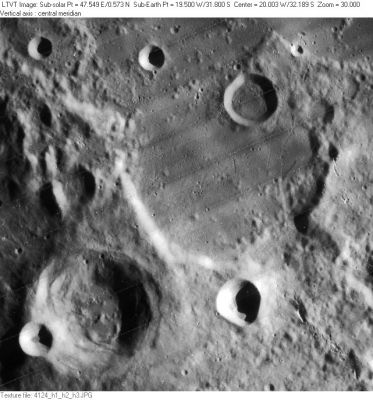
- Lunar Orbiter 4 image the top of the crater with the neighboring Cichus on the bottom left
- Coordinates: 31.8°S 19.5°W
- Diameter: 66 km
- Colongitude: 20° at sunrise
- Eponym: Edmund Weiss

Weiss is a lunar impact crater along the southern edge of the Mare Nubium. It was named after Austrian astronomer Edmund Weiss. Nearly attached to the southwest rim is the crater Cichus, and Pitatus lies just over one crater diameter to the east-northeast. To the east-southeast lies the eroded Wurzelbauer.

The northern rim of this crater has been removed and the interior flooded by lava, leaving a nearly featureless surface. The southern half of the rim still survives, although it is eroded in places. This rim climbs to a height of 0.8 km above the base. The satellite crater Weiss E lies at the northern edge of the interior floor, along the surviving remnant of the rim edge. A smaller crater just to the east of Weiss E has incised the low rise along the northeastern side.

The crater is marked by traces of the ray system from the prominent crater Tycho, which lies several hundred kilometers to the southeast. To the north of Weiss is the rille designated Rima Hesiodus, named after the crater Hesiodus to the northeast.

South of Weiss, bowl-shaped crater Cichus B looks bright white during full moon. This brightness is also noticeable on the photographic version of chart LAC 111 (page 222) in The Clementine Atlas of the Moon (Ben Bussey / Paul D. Spudis).

== Satellite craters ==
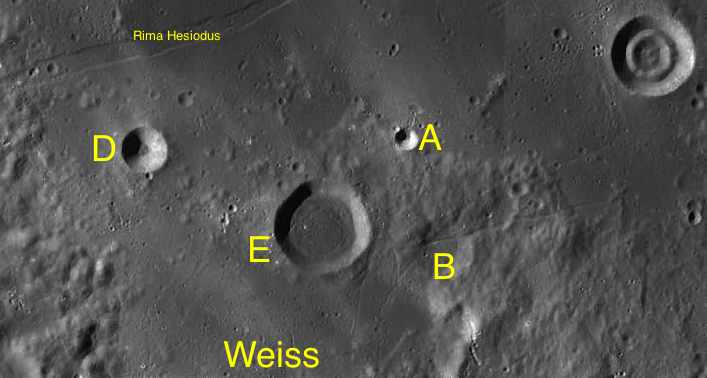
Weiss and its satellite craters

By convention these features are identified on lunar maps by placing the letter on the side of the crater midpoint that is closest to Weiss.

Weiss	Latitude	Longitude	Diameter
A	30.5° S	18.6° W	4 km
B	31.2° S	18.4° W	10 km
D	30.7° S	20.3° W	9 km
E	31.1° S	19.2° W	17 km
