= Cichus (crater) =

Lunar impact crater

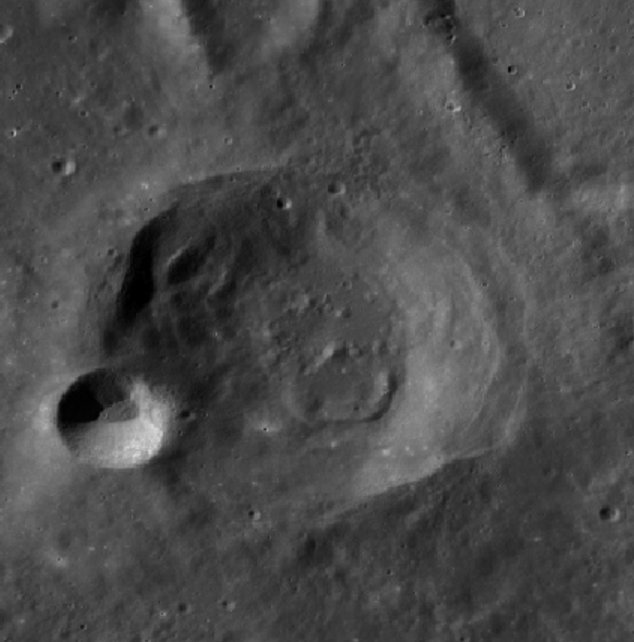
- LRO image
- Coordinates: 33.29°S 21.18°W
- Diameter: 39.18 km (24.35 mi)
- Depth: 2.8 km (1.7 mi)
- Colongitude: 21° at sunrise
- Formation: Eratosthenian
- Eponym: Cecco d'Ascoli

Cichus is a lunar impact crater that lies in the southwestern part of the Moon, at the eastern edge of Palus Epidemiarum. Just to the northeast and nearly contacting the rim is the lava-flooded crater remnant Weiss.

This formation dates to the Eratosthenian period on the lunar geologic time scale. The rim is only slightly worn, although the crater Cichus C lies across the southwestern rim. Sections of the inner wall are terraced, and the western side is somewhat wider than in the east. Several small ridges lie across the interior floor. A ray from the bright crater Tycho to the southeast passes tangentially just to the northeast of the rim.

This formation is named after Italian astronomer Francesco Degli Stabili (Cecco d'Ascoli) (1257-1327). His name was included in the lunar nomenclature of Italian astronomer Giovanni B. Riccioli in 1651, but he assigned it to the crater now named Capuanus. Its modern designation was formally adopted by the International Astronomical Union in 1935.

== Satellite craters ==
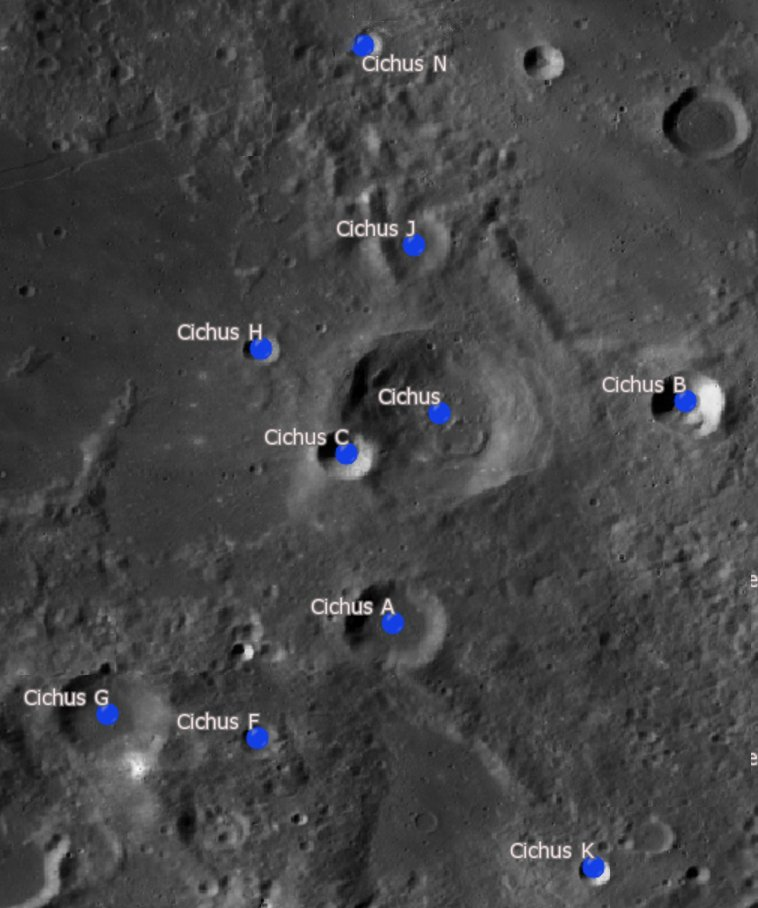
Cichus and its satellite craters (LRO image)

By convention these features are identified on lunar maps by placing the letter on the side of the crater midpoint that is closest to Cichus.

| Cichus | Latitude | Longitude | Diameter |
|---|---|---|---|
| A | 34.8° S | 21.4° W | 21 km |
| B | 33.2° S | 19.3° W | 14 km |
| C | 33.5° S | 21.8° W | 11 km |
| F | 35.7° S | 22.4° W | 8 km |
| G | 35.5° S | 23.5° W | 23 km |
| H | 32.8° S | 22.4° W | 7 km |
| J | 32.0° S | 21.3° W | 13 km |
| K | 36.6° S | 19.9° W | 6 km |
| N | 30.5° S | 21.7° W | 8 km |

== Satellite crater Cichus B during full moon ==
Cichus B, south of Weiss, looks bright white during full moon. Cichus B is an eye-catching formation in the northwestern double ejectaray from Tycho. The brightness of Cichus B is also noticeable on the photographic version of chart LAC 111 (page 222) in The Clementine Atlas of the Moon (Ben Bussey / Paul D. Spudis).
