= Liverpool Astronomical Society =

- Abbreviation: LAS
- Formation: 1881
- Legal status: Society
- Purpose: study of celestial objects
- Location: Liverpool, England
- Official language: English
- President: Mr S.Southern
- Main organ: (gral. assembly, board of directors, etc)
- Website: Liverpool Astronomical Society

The Liverpool Astronomical Society was founded in 1881 in Liverpool, England, as a society to promote and coordinate amateur astronomy.

In 1893 the Society was gifted a 5" (125mm) aperture Cooke equatorial telescope and a 2” (50mm) transit telescope by Thomas Rylands. An observatory was built for it on the roof of the William Brown building in central Liverpool. However from around 1899 the society ceased activities, only for it to be revived in July 1901. Four Liverpool Astronomical Society Members joined the British Astronomical Association expedition to observe the total solar eclipse of 30 August 1905. A second period of inactivity occurred during and after the First World War from 1914 until 1922. The Cooke telescope is still owned by the society, but is currently unused.

The Society’s current observatory, known as the Leighton Observatory, is at Pex Hill, Cronton, Merseyside outside Liverpool. It was formerly known as Pex Hill Observatory and Visitors' Centre.

== Presidents ==
Partial list 1881 to 1925.

- 1881–1882, unknown
- 1882–1884, Richard Coward Johnson
- 1884–1885, Thomas Henry Espinall Compton Espin
- 1885–1886, Isaac Roberts
- 1887–1888, William Frederick Denning
- 1888–1889, Thomas Gwyn Elger
- 1889–1890, Stephen Joseph Perry
- 1890–1893, William Benjamin Hutchinson
- 1893–1894, James Gill
- 1894–1897, William Edward Plummer
- 1897–1899, George Higgs
- 1899–1901, society inactive
- 1901–1914, William Edward Plummer
- 1914–1922, society inactive
- 1923–1925, Harold Whichello

== Special Observer ==
The laws of the Society provided for a ‘Special Observer’. The Observer was to have control of the Society’s Observatory to

- 1 Corroborate the observations of Society Members.
- 2 Assist Members requiring practical help in observational Astronomy.
- 3 Undertake systematic observations on behalf of the Society.

T H E C Espin was appointed as special observer while living at West Kirby. To show compliance with task 3 Espin published ‘A Catalogue of the Magnitudes of 500 Stars in Auriga, Gemini and Leo Minor’ in volume three of the LAS Transactions in 1884. He also published ‘circulars’ to the membership of the society advising on objects suitable for observation.

He retained the title despite moving to Wolsingham in 1885 and Tow Law in 1888. However the title was rescinded when he resigned from the LAS in 1890.

== See also ==
- List of astronomical societies
