= Johann Kies =

German astronomer and mathematician

Johann Kies (September 14, 1713 – July 29, 1781) was a German astronomer and mathematician. Born in Tübingen, Kies worked in Berlin in 1751 alongside Jérôme Lalande in order to make observations on the lunar parallax in concert with those of Nicolas Louis de Lacaille at the Cape of Good Hope.

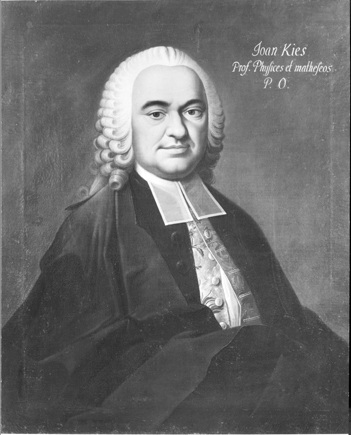
Johann Kies.

From 1742 to 1754, at the recommendation of the mathematician Leonhard Euler, he was made professor of mathematics at Berlin's Academy of Sciences and astronomer at its observatory. His reports from this time include De la Situation la plus avantageuse des planètes pour découvrir les irrégularités de leurs mouvemens, Sur les Éclipses des étoiles fixes par la lune, and Description d'un instrument qui se trouve à l'observatoire de Berlin. In his Rapport de quelques observations célestes faites à l'observatoire Royal, Kies wrote, "Observations on eclipses are extremely useful, especially the ones that are exact. They serve primarily to understand, if the theories on the Sun and the Moon are well or badly ascertained in the astronomical tables, and can either confirm them, or give us a need to reform them."

He subsequently taught also at the Collegium of Tübingen. From 1754 to 1755, Kies served as director of the Astronomisches Rechen-Institut in Heidelberg.

Kies was one of the first to propagate Newton's discoveries in Germany, and dedicated two of his works to the Englishman: De viribus centralibus (Tübingen, 1758) and De lege gravitatis (Tübingen, 1773). Kies is also the author of a work on lunar influences: De influxu lunae in partes terrae mobiles (Tübingen, 1769). He wrote many other works, both in French and in Latin, on astronomy.

Kies corresponded with Euler from 1747 to 1767. Their correspondence consists of 8 letters, all of which were written by Kies.

The crater Kies on the Moon is named after him.

== Sources ==
- (in French) Imago Mundi: Johann Kies
- (in English) Euler’s Correspondents
