= 614 Pia =

Main-belt asteroid

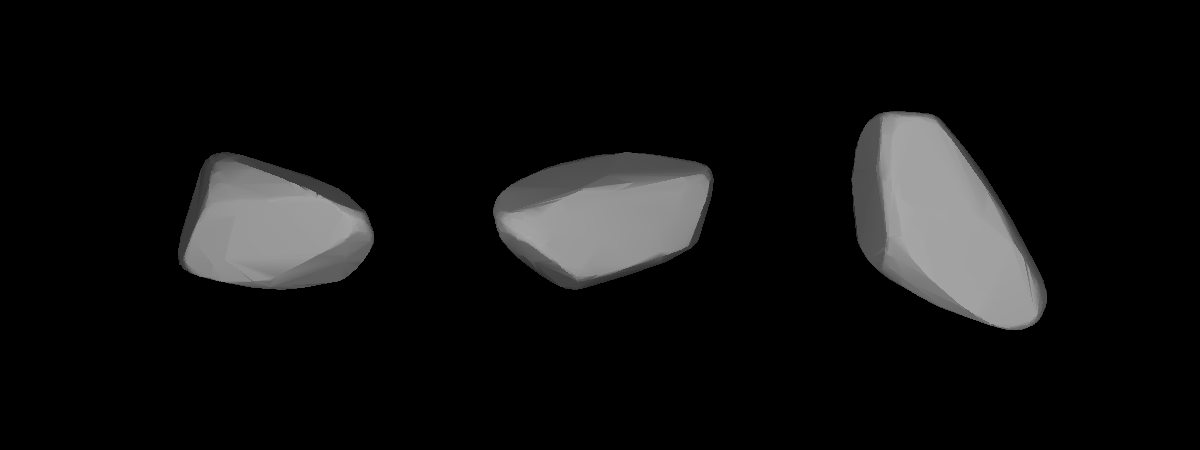
- A three-dimensional model of 614 Pia based on its light curve

Discovery
- Discovered by: August Kopff
- Discovery site: Heidelberg
- Discovery date: 11 October 1906

Designations
- Alternative designations: 1906 VQ

Orbital characteristics
- Epoch 31 July 2016 (JD 2457600.5)
- Uncertainty parameter 0
- Observation arc: 109.50 yr (39996 d)
- Aphelion: 2.9930 AU (447.75 Gm)
- Perihelion: 2.3942 AU (358.17 Gm)
- Semi-major axis: 2.6936 AU (402.96 Gm)
- Eccentricity: 0.11115
- Orbital period (sidereal): 4.42 yr (1614.7 d)
- Mean anomaly: 267.21°
- Mean motion: 0° 13^{m} 22.62^{s} / day
- Inclination: 7.0266°
- Longitude of ascending node: 217.291°
- Argument of perihelion: 208.792°

Physical characteristics
- Mean radius: 12.905±0.75 km
- Synodic rotation period: 4.572 h (0.1905 d)
- Geometric albedo: 0.1056±0.013
- Absolute magnitude (H): 11.0

614 Pia is a minor planet orbiting the Sun between Mars and Jupiter in the asteroid belt. August Kopff discovered 614 Pia on 11 October 1906 at Heidelberg, Germany. Its name may have been inspired by the Pia Observatory at Trieste, Italy, which German astronomer Johann Nepomuk Krieger (1865–1902) named for his wife, Pia. Pia is Italian for "pious."
