= Rudolf König =

Austrian merchant, astronomer and selenographer

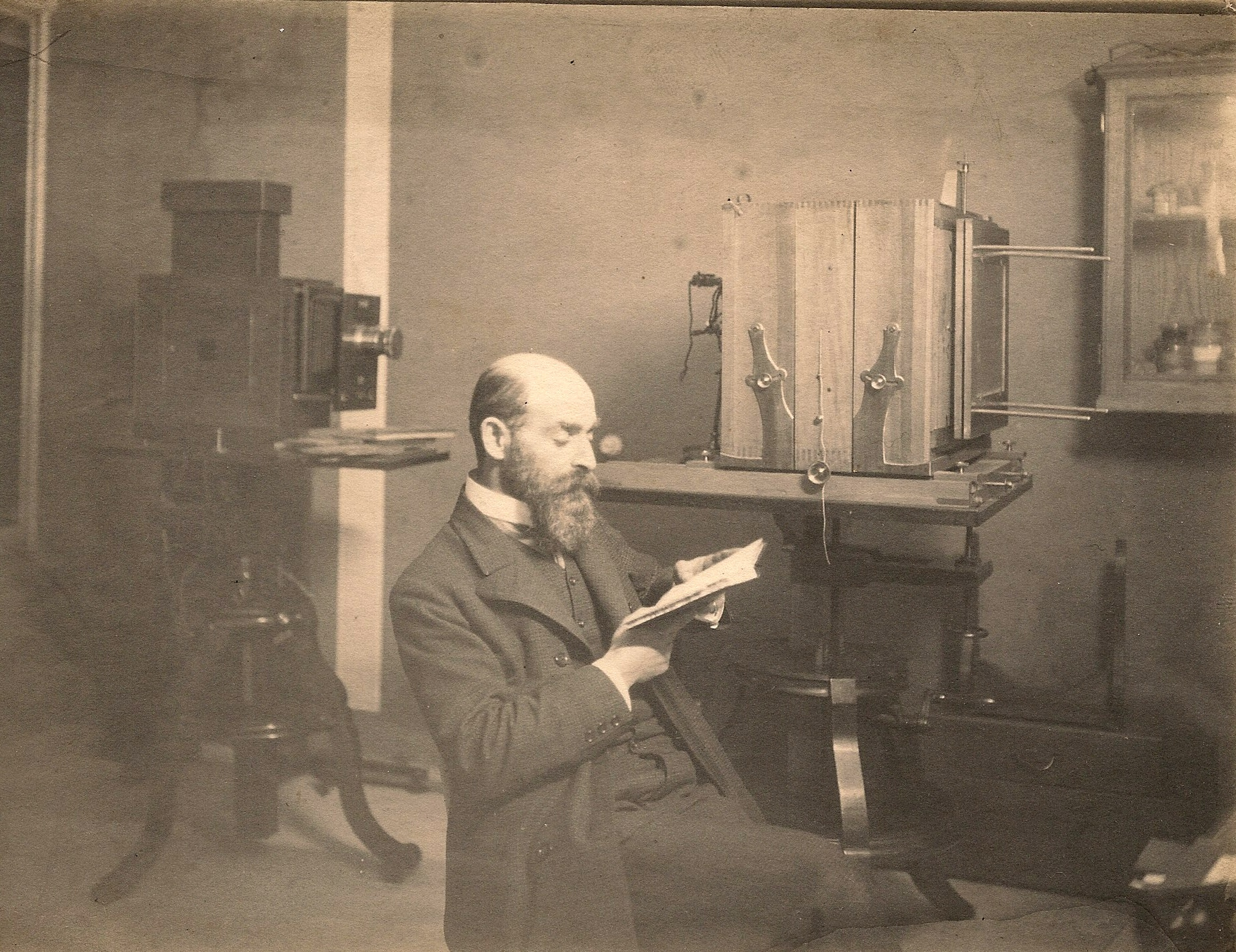
Rudolf König

Rudolf König (18 August 1865 – 30 January 1927) was an Austrian merchant, amateur astronomer and selenographer.

== Biography ==
König was born in Vienna and received his technical education in Leipzig. He was the son of Georg König, a fur businessman. While he worked for his father's fur business, he attended lectures at the University of Vienna and acquired astronomical knowledge. König and his wife Josefine Antonie König had two children.

=== Private observatory ===
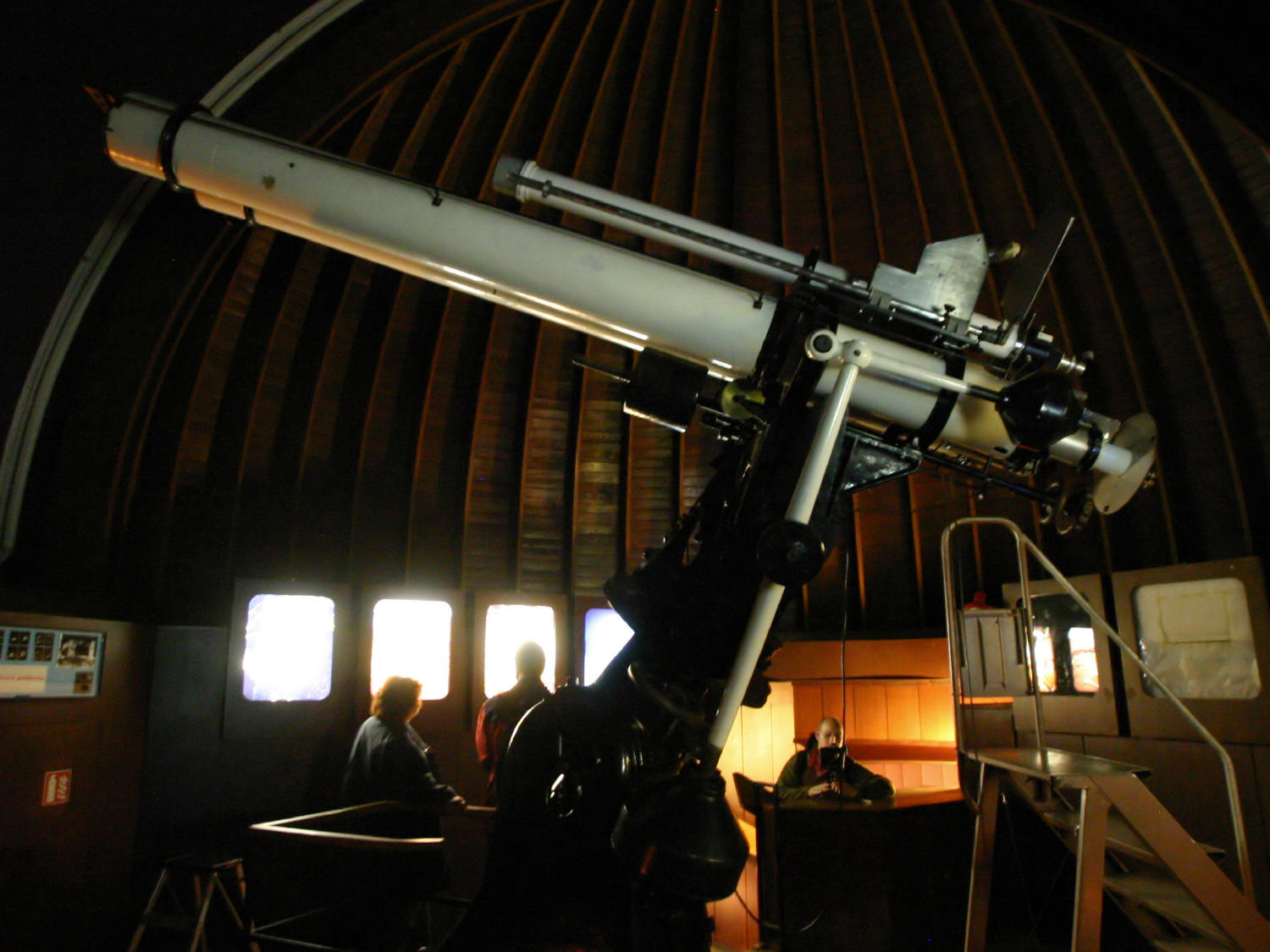
Štefánik Observatory Zeiss Refractor

As he had an interest in astronomy, in 1906 he built a private observatory in Vienna, on the top of his house, 12 Kuppelwiesergasse. The instrument was designed for astrophotography and consisted of Carl Zeiss’ 18 cm and 21 cm diameter double refactors on an equatorial mount. From his observatory, he observed the crater König named after him and completed his study for his deceased friend, the draftsman, and selenographer, Johann Kreiger. In 1929, after König's death, his widow sold the telescope to the “Bohemian Astronomical Society” to build a public observatory in Prague. The observatory is now operated by the Stefanik Observatory in Prague. The Vienna Observatory houses his specialist library, as well as other astronomical instruments.

=== Study for Kreiger’s publication ===
König was a friend of Johann Krieger as well as the co-editor of Kreiger's Mond Atlas. After Krieger's death, he left mass unorganized descriptions and sketches of the Moon observation. König then spent two years’ observation on his observatory, and within five years arranged two Krieger's volumes including his reproduction drawing and sketches, and requisite letterpress. In 1912. König published a volume of Johann Krieger’s illustrations of the Moon.
