= Campanus (crater) =

Lunar impact crater

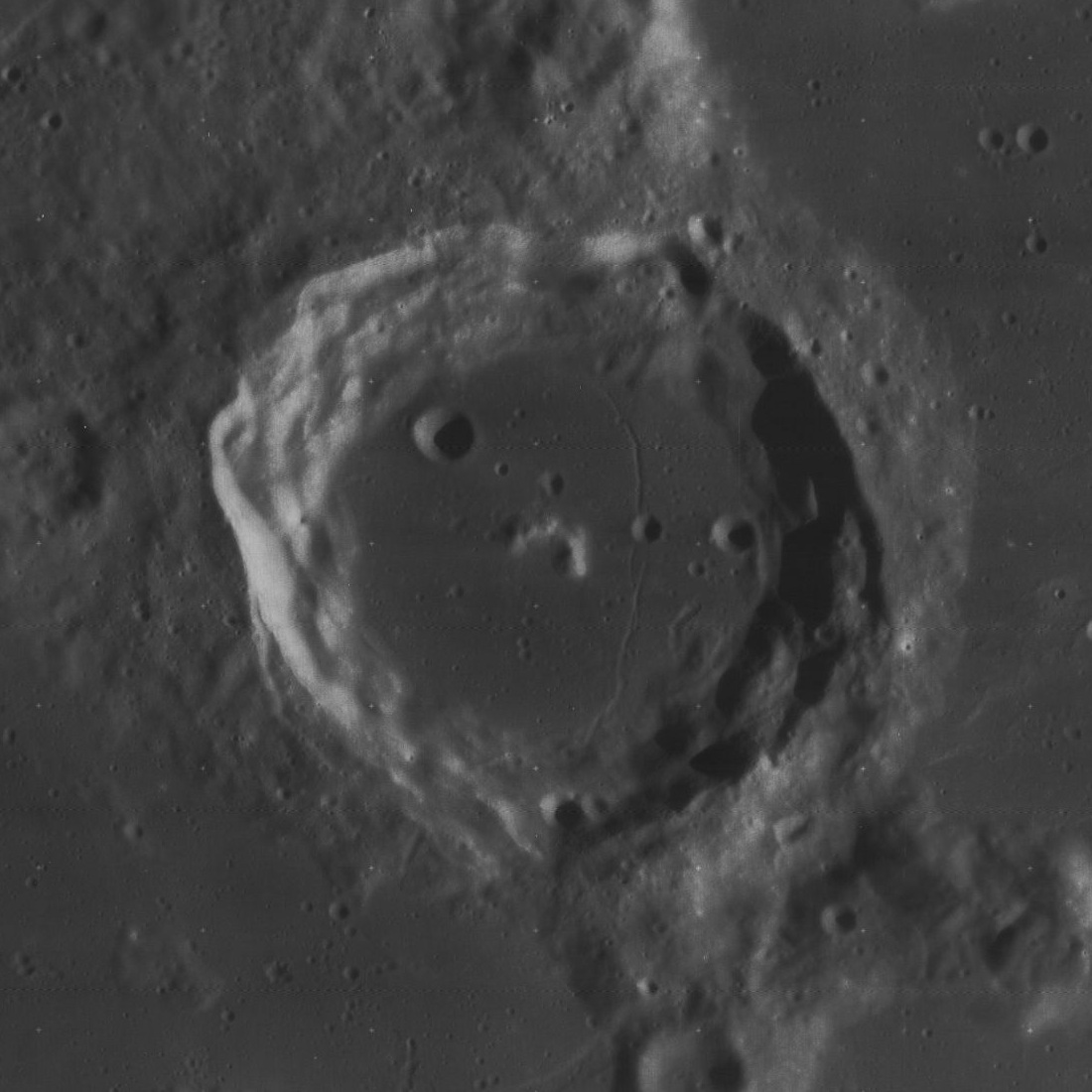
- Lunar Orbiter 4 image
- Coordinates: 28.0°S 27.8°W
- Diameter: 46.41 km (28.84 mi)
- Depth: 2 km (1.2 mi)
- Colongitude: 29° at sunrise
- Formation: Lower Imbrian
- Eponym: Campanus of Novara

Campanus is a lunar impact crater that is located on the southwestern edge of Mare Nubium. It forms a crater pair with Mercator just to the southeast. Along the southern rampart of Campanus is the small lunar mare named Palus Epidemiarum. To the southwest is the small crater Dunthorne.

On the lunar geologic timescale, Campanus is a crater of Lower (Early) Imbrian age. This is a well-formed crater, with a roughly circular rim, an outward bulge along the western rim and an inward bulge to the north-northwest. The outer wall has not been significantly eroded, although it has a low saddle-point along the south. Unlike Mercator, there is a system of terraces along the inner wall.

The interior floor has been resurfaced by basaltic-lava, leaving only a small central peak projecting above the surface. As T. W. Webb noted, "Campanus contains an especially dark center". The floor has the same low albedo as the nearby mare, giving it a dark appearance. It is marked by a pair of tiny craterlets near the northeast and northwest interior walls, Campanus X and Y, respectively. A slender rille crosses the crater floor from north to south, passing to the east of the central peak.

To the west of Campanus is the rille system named Rimae Hippalus. Another rille system lies to the south, designated Rimae Ramsden.

This formation is named after Italian astronomer Campanus of Novara (c. 1200-1296). His name was included in lunar nomenclature by Italian astronomer Giovanni Riccioli in 1651. Its designation was formally adopted by the International Astronomical Union in 1935.

== Rand McNally's Golubiz Cluster ==
East-northeast of Campanus and west-southwest of Kies, a small group of hills and hillocks is called Golubiz Cluster on the greenish colored moonmap from Rand McNally. This name was not accepted by the International Astronomical Union (IAU).

== Satellite craters ==
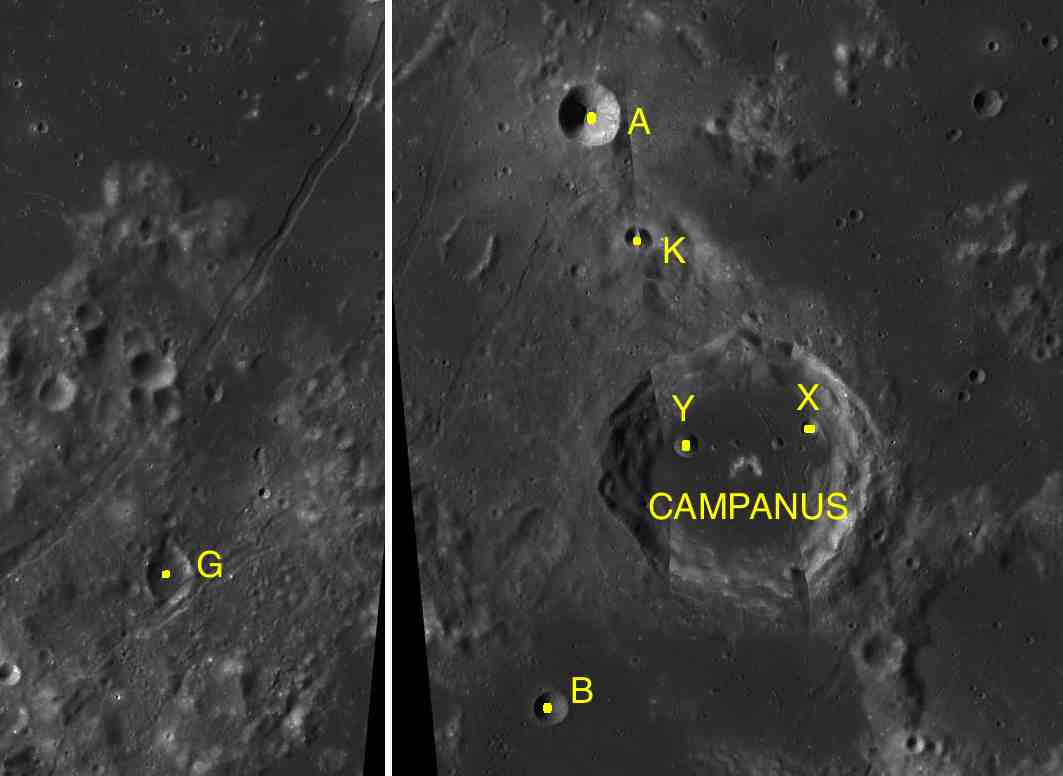
Campanus and its satellite craters

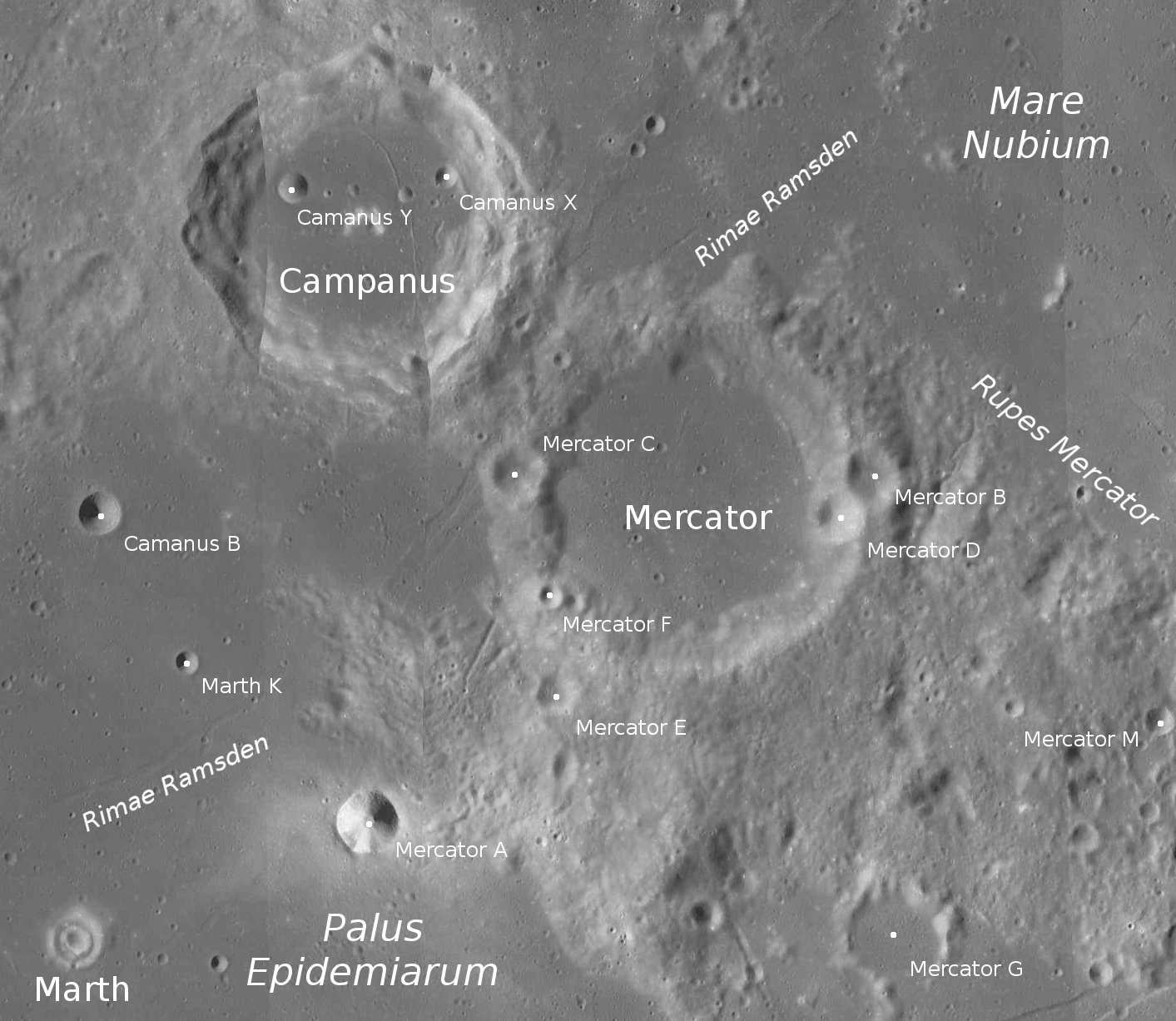
Campanus, Mercator, and surroundings

By convention these features are identified on lunar maps by placing the letter on the side of the crater midpoint that is closest to Campanus.

Campanus	Latitude	Longitude	Diameter
A	26.0° S	28.6° W	11 km
B	29.2° S	29.2° W	6 km
G	28.6° S	31.3° W	10 km
K	26.6° S	28.3° W	5 km
X	27.8° S	27.3° W	4 km
Y	27.8° S	28.2° W	4 km
