= Bullialdus (crater) =

Crater on the Moon

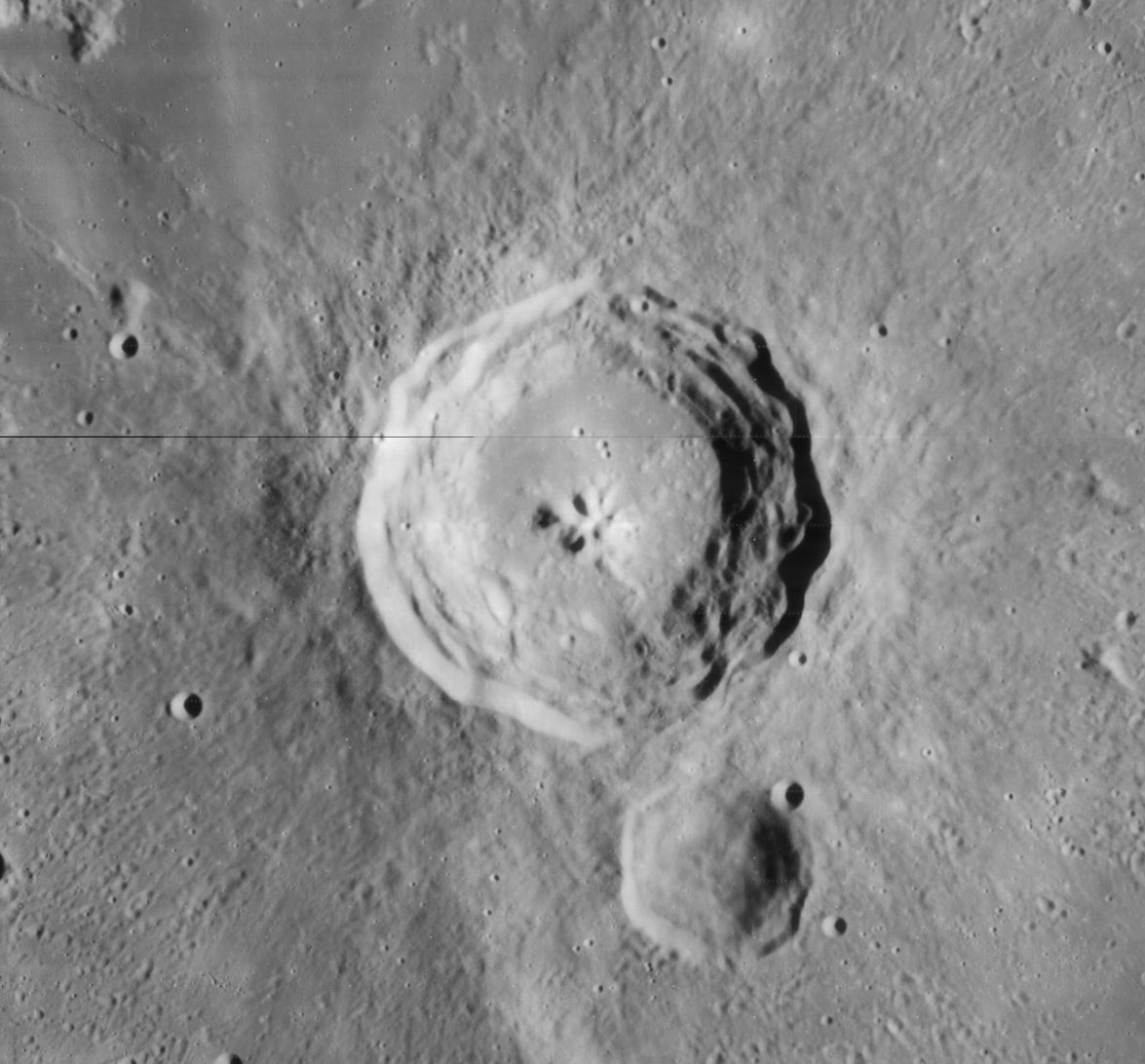
- Lunar Orbiter 4 image
- Coordinates: 20.7°S 22.2°W
- Diameter: 61 km (38 mi)
- Depth: 3.5 km (2.2 mi)
- Colongitude: 2° at sunrise
- Formation: Eratosthenian
- Eponym: Ismaël Boulliau

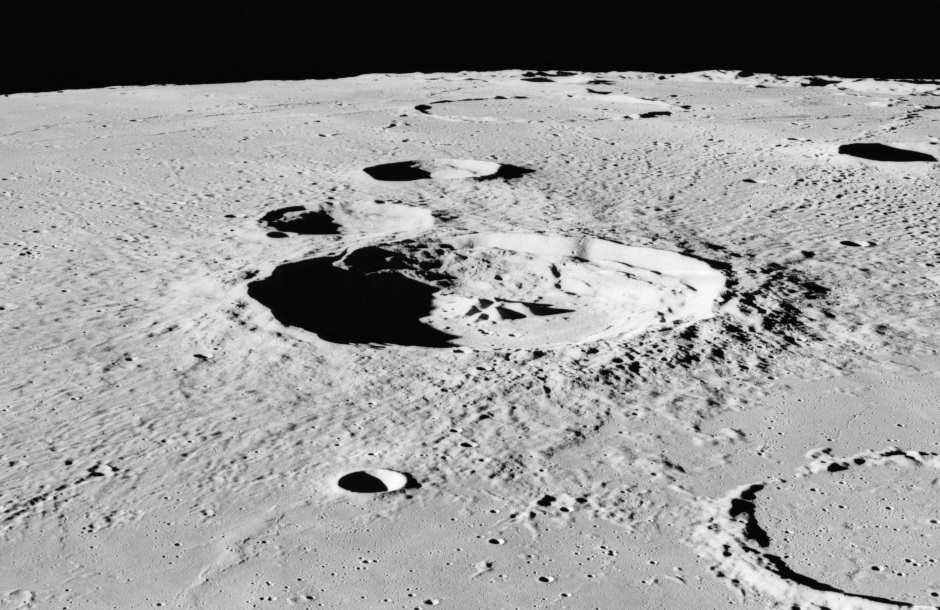
Oblique view facing south from Apollo 16

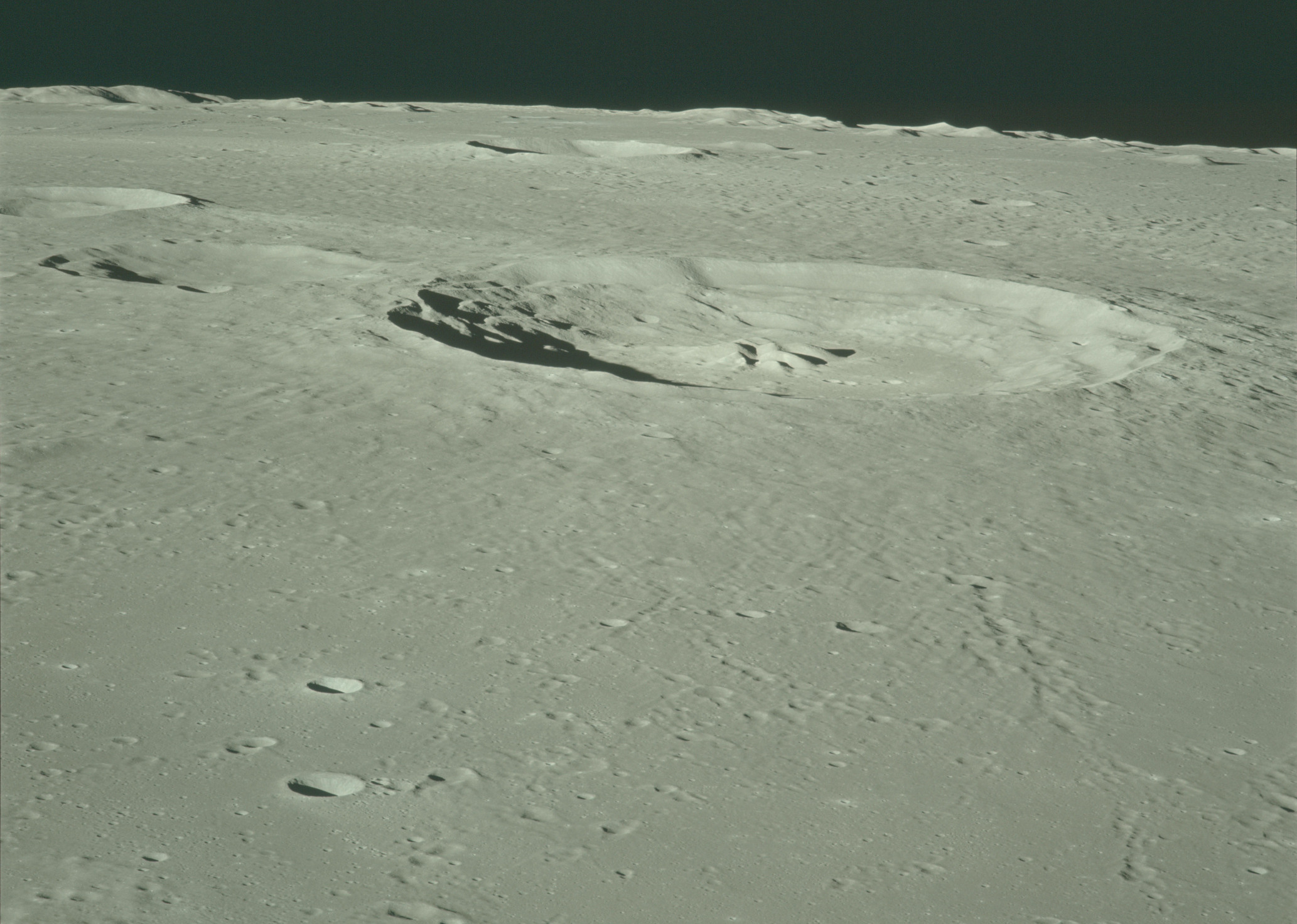
Another Oblique view from Apollo 16

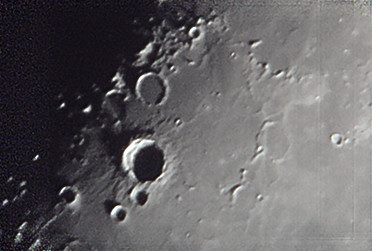
Bullialdus crater as viewed from earth, below left of center

Bullialdus is a lunar impact crater located in the western part of the Mare Nubium. T. W. Webb calls it a "grand crater ... with a quadruple central hill". Patrick Moore said this is, "a particularly fine crater; it has been described as a miniature Copernicus," a reference to Copernicus crater. To the north by north-west of Bullialdus is the broken-rimmed and lava-flooded crater Lubiniezky. South-west of Bullialdus lies the smaller crater König.

This crater is named after French astronomer Ismaël Boulliau (1605-1694). His name was incorporated into lunar nomenclature by Italian astronomer Giovanni B. Riccioli in 1651. Its designation was formally adopted by the International Astronomical Union in 1935.

== Description ==
The relatively isolated location of this crater serves to highlight its well-formed shape. Bullialdus has a high outer rim that is circular but observers have noted a slightly polygonal appearance. The inner walls are terraced and contain many signs of landslips. The outer ramparts are covered in a wide ejecta blanket that highlights a radial pattern of low ridges and valleys.

On the lunar geologic timescale, Bullialdus is a crater of Eratosthenian age. In the center of the crater is a formation of several peaks and rises that climb to over a kilometer in height. A raised ridge runs from the peaks to the south-east, until finally merging with the inner wall. The floor of the crater is generally rough with many low rises. The level part of the floor is covered in lava that is younger than the impact. Overall it has a somewhat convex shape, bulging upward toward the middle. When the Sun is at a high angle, the rim and central mountains appear brighter than the surroundings, and white patches can be viewed on the crater floor.

Infrared studies of the crater region have revealed at least three layers of strata. The impact may also have intersected a mafic pluton, which means a crystallized body of igneous rock that has high concentrations of heavier elements (such as magnesium, in this case). The spectra of the orthopyroxene-rich central peak fits a gabbroic norite mineralogy, which originated from a depth of 6.0 to 9.2 km. Hydroxyl-bearing magmatic material has been detected in the crater, which was likely excavated from below the surface during the impact.

== Satellite craters ==
By convention these features are identified on lunar maps by placing the letter on the side of the crater midpoint that is closest to Bullialdus. Bullialdus A lies just to the south-west of Bullialdus, within its ramparts. To the south of Bullialdus A is the slightly smaller Bullialdus B.

Bullialdus	Latitude	Longitude	Diameter
A	22.1° S	21.5° W	26 km
B	23.4° S	21.9° W	21 km
E	21.7° S	23.9° W	4 km
F	22.5° S	24.8° W	6 km
G	23.2° S	23.6° W	4 km
H	22.7° S	19.3° W	5 km
K	21.8° S	25.6° W	12 km
L	20.2° S	24.4° W	4 km
R	20.1° S	19.8° W	17 km
Y	18.5° S	19.1° W	4 km
