= Campanus of Novara =

Italian mathematician and astrologer (c. 1220–1296)

Magister Campanus Nouariensis
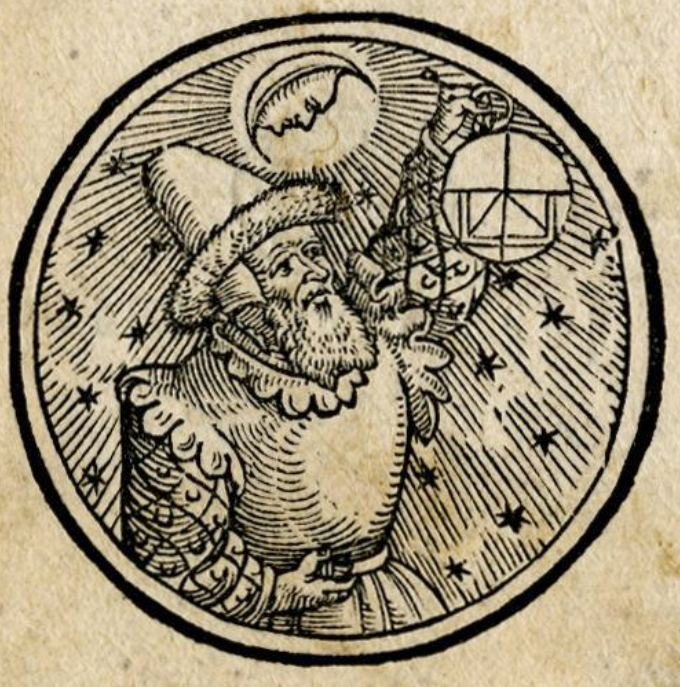
- Born: c. 1220; Novara
- Died: 1296; Viterbo
- Other names: Campanus of Novara, Campanus de Novaria, Campanus Novariensis, Iohannes Campanus, Johannes Campanus

Campanus of Novara (c. 1220 – 1296) was an Italian mathematician, astronomer, astrologer, and physician who is best known for his work on Euclid's Elements. In his writings he refers to himself as Campanus Nouariensis; contemporary documents refer to him as Magister Campanus; and the full style of his name is Magister Campanus Nouariensis. He is also referred to as Campano da Novara, Giovanni Campano or similar. Later authors (from the 16th century on) sometimes applied the forename Johannes Campanus or Iohannes Campanus.

His date of birth is uncertain but may have been as early as the first decade of the 13th century and the place of birth was probably Novara in Piedmont. He served as chaplain to Pope Urban IV, Pope Adrian V, Pope Nicholas IV, and Pope Boniface VIII. His contemporary Roger Bacon cited Campanus as one of the two "good" (but not "perfect") mathematicians indicating that Bacon considered Campanus as excellent or one of the greatest mathematicians of their time. A number of benefices were conferred upon him, and he was relatively wealthy at the time of his death. He died at Viterbo in 1296. The crater Campanus on the Moon is named after him.

== Published works ==
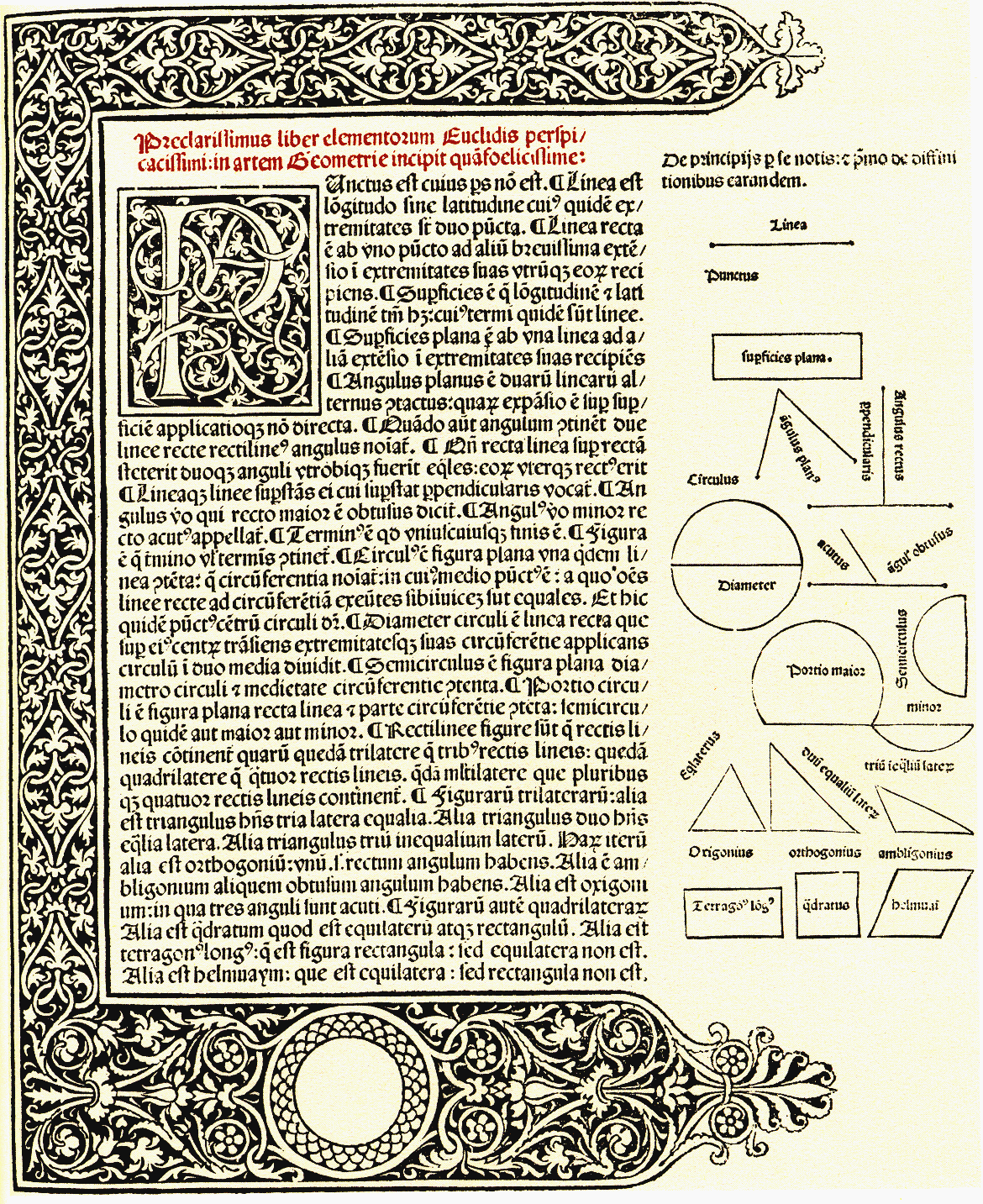
First page of the Latin edition of Euclid's Elements by Campanus (1482 printing)

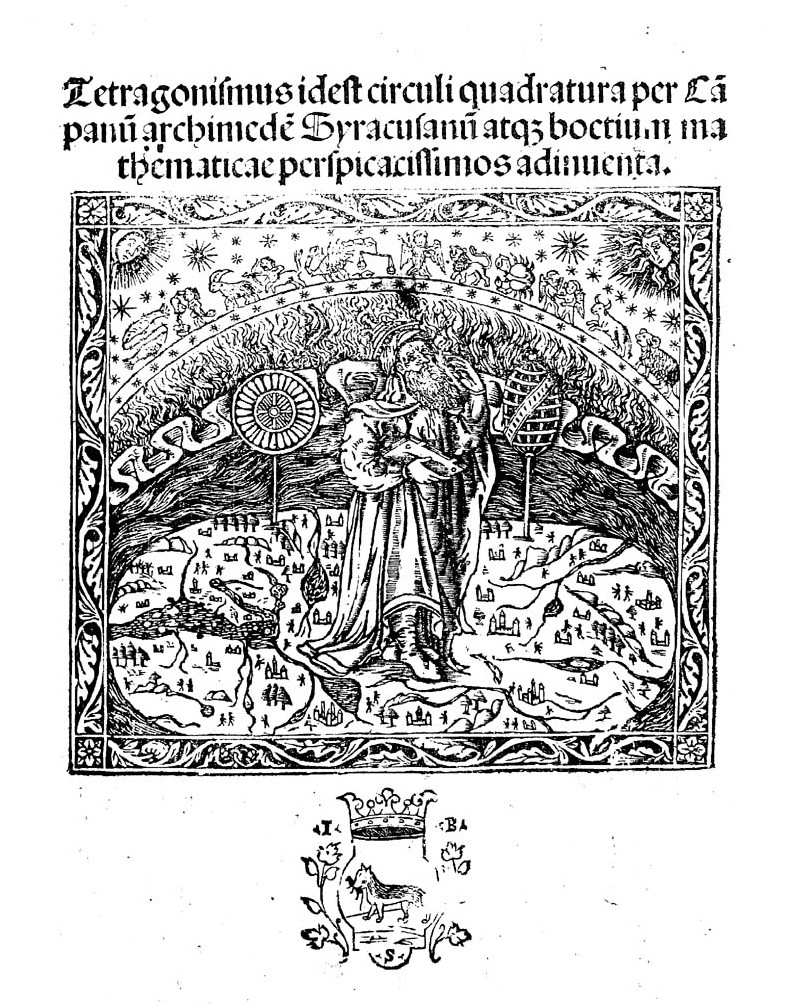
Tetragonismus idest circuli quadratura, 1503

Campanus wrote a Latin edition of Euclid's Elementa in fifteen books. This work by Campanus was influential and was the most frequently used compilation of Euclid until the 16th century. It was based on a compilation by Robert of Chester and also includes material from: Arithmetica by Jordanus de Nemore, commentary on Euclid by Anaritius, and additions by Campanus himself. It would later become the first printed edition of Euclid, published by Erhard Ratdolt in Venice in 1482 as Preclarissimus liber elementorum Euclidis perspicacissimi.

In the field of astronomy, he wrote a Theorica Planetarum in which he geometrically described the motions of the planets as well as their longitude. He also included instructions on building a planetary equatorium as well as its geometrical description. Campanus also attempted to determine the time of each planet's retrograde motion. The data on planets are drawn from the Almagest and the Toledan Tables of the Arab astronomer Arzachel. Campanus gave precise instructions on using the tables, and made detailed calculations of the distances to the planets and their sizes. This work has been called "the first detailed account of the Ptolemaic astronomical system... to be written in the Latin-speaking West."

A house system for horoscopes that divides the prime vertical into equal 30° arcs, or houses, is often attributed to him but the method is known to have been described by others before his time.

=== Bibliography ===
- Elementa, 1255–1259
- Theorica planetarum, 1261–1264
- Computus maior, 1268
- Tractatus de sphera, after 1268
- De quadratura circuli
- De quadrante
- Tres circulos in astrolapsu descriptos...
- Tractatus de astrologia indicaria
