= Mercator (crater) =

Lunar impact crater

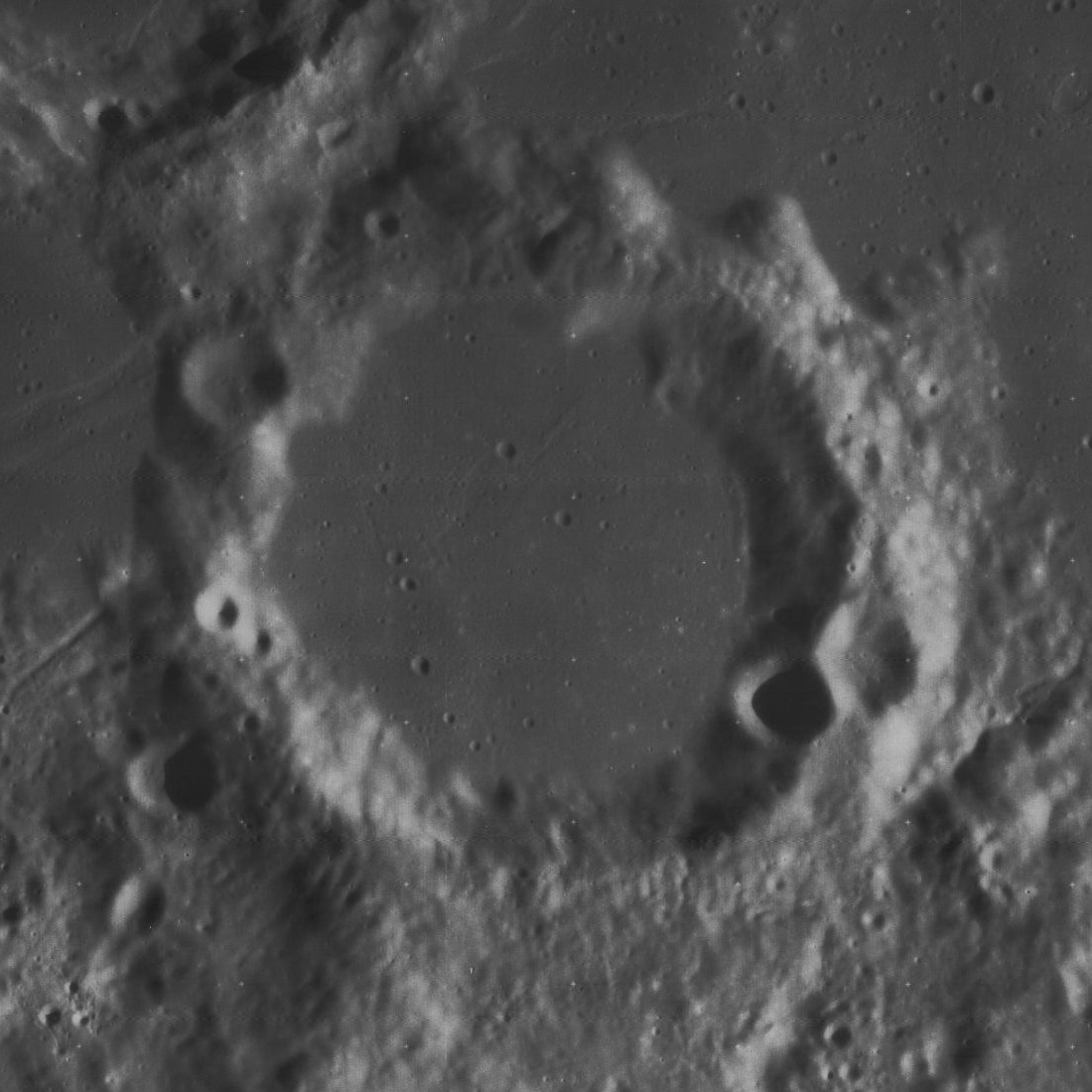
- Lunar Orbiter 4 image
- Coordinates: 29.25°S 26.11°W
- Diameter: 46.32 km
- Depth: 1.1 km
- Colongitude: 26° at sunrise
- Formation: Nectarian
- Eponym: Gerardus Mercator

Mercator is a lunar impact crater that is located on the southwestern edge of Mare Nubium, in the southwest part of the Moon. It was named after 16th-century Southern Dutch cartographer Gerardus Mercator. It is located to the southeast of the crater Campanus, and the two are separated by a narrow, winding valley.

The Rupes Mercator fault is tangential with the northeastern outer rim of Mercator. The eastern edge of Palus Epidemiarum reaches the west rim of Mercator, and a rille from the Rimae Ramsden reaches the western rim at the site of the craterlet Mercator C.

The rim of Mercator is only somewhat eroded, and several tiny craters lie on the west and eastern rims. The interior floor has been flooded by lava in the past, leaving a relatively smooth and featureless surface.

Mercator is a crater of Nectarian age.

== Dark spokes in Mercator A ==
Satellite crater Mercator A, southwest of Mercator itself, shows a system of dark spokes on its bright inner slopes. This system of dark spokes has the shape of an X of which the southern part of it has a much lower albedo than the northern part. A tiny section of Mercator A's dark spokes is noticeable on the photographic version of chart LAC 94 (page 188) in The Clementine Atlas of the Moon (Ben Bussey / Paul D. Spudis).

== Satellite craters ==
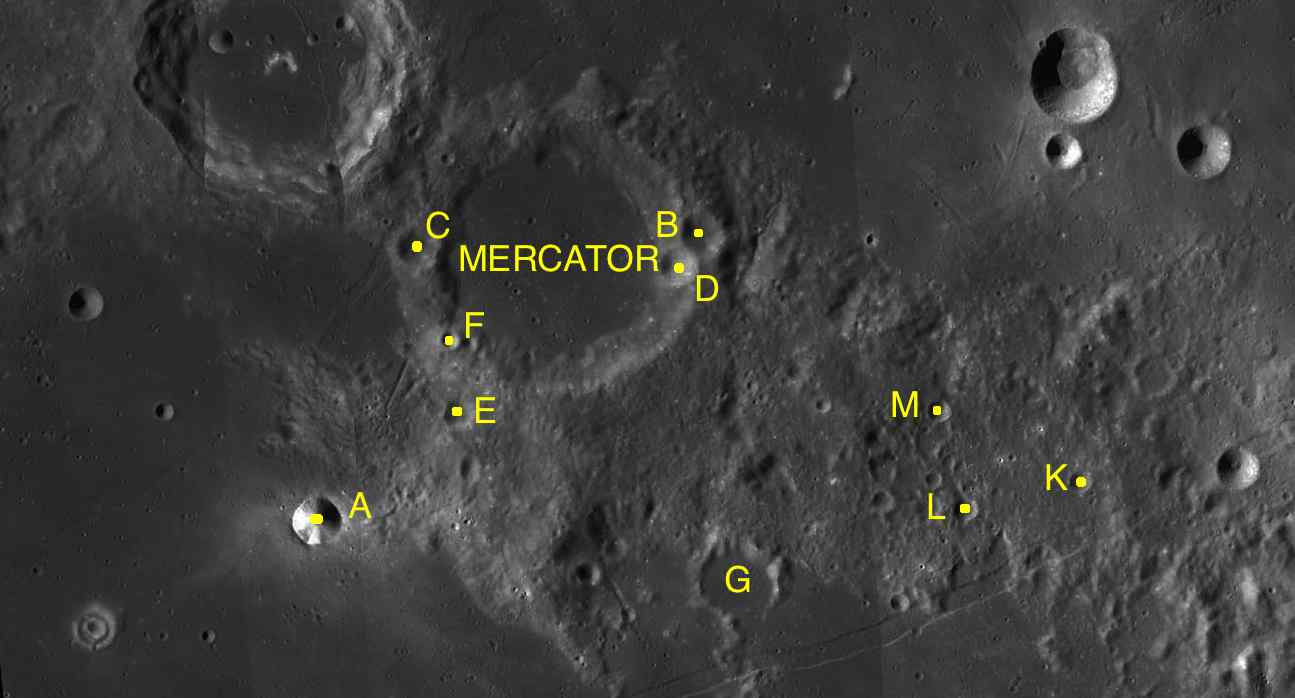
Mercator and its satellite craters

By convention these features are identified on lunar maps by placing the letter on the side of the crater midpoint that is closest to Mercator.

| Mercator | Latitude | Longitude | Diameter |
|---|---|---|---|
| A | 30.6° S | 27.8° W | 9 km |
| B | 29.1° S | 25.1° W | 8 km |
| C | 29.1° S | 26.9° W | 8 km |
| D | 29.3° S | 25.3° W | 7 km |
| E | 30.0° S | 26.8° W | 5 km |
| F | 29.6° S | 26.8° W | 4 km |
| G | 31.1° S | 25.0° W | 14 km |
| K | 30.6° S | 22.7° W | 4 km |
| L | 30.7° S | 23.5° W | 4 km |
| M | 30.2° S | 23.6° W | 4 km |
