= Richard Dunthorne =

Richard Dunthorne (1711 – 3 March 1775) was an English astronomer and surveyor, who worked in Cambridge as astronomical and scientific assistant to Roger Long (master of Pembroke Hall and Lowndean Professor of Astronomy and Geometry), and also concurrently for many years as surveyor to the Bedford Level Corporation.

== Life and work ==
There are short biographical notes of Dunthorne, one in the Philosophical Transactions (Abridgement Series, published 1809) (unsigned), another in the Dictionary of National Biography (vol.16), and a third by W T Lynn. Dunthorne was born in humble circumstances in Ramsey, Cambridgeshire, where he attended the free grammar school. There he attracted the notice of Roger Long (later Master of Pembroke Hall, Cambridge), whose protégé Dunthorne became. Dunthorne moved to Cambridge where Long first appointed him as a "footboy", and where he received some further education (though this does not seem to have been regular university education). Dunthorne then "managed" a preparatory school in Coggeshall, Essex, and later returned to Cambridge where Long obtained for him an appointment as a "butler" at Pembroke Hall, an office that Dunthorne retained for the rest of his life. Here, Dunthorne's main activity seems to have been in assisting Long in astronomical and scientific work.

Dunthorne also held an appointment for some years, concurrently with his work with Long, as superintendent of works of the Bedford Level Corporation, responsible for water management in the Fens; he began this work several years" before 1761, continuing into the 1770s. In this role, Dunthorne was concerned in a survey of the Fens in Cambridgeshire, and he also supervised construction of locks near Chesterton on the River Cam.

Dunthorne's association with Long remained lifelong, and in the end Dunthorne acted as executor of Long's will.

== Lunar tables ==
Dunthorne published a book of astronomical tables in 1739 entitled Practical Astronomy of the Moon: or, new Tables... Exactly constructed from Sir Isaac Newton's Theory, as published by Dr Gregory in his Astronomy, London & Oxford, 1739. These tables were modelled on Isaac Newton's lunar theory of 1702, to facilitate testing Newton's theory.

In a 1746 letter to the keeper of Cambridge's Woodwardian Museum, Dunthorne wrote: "After I had compared a good Number of modern Observations made in different Situations of the Moon and of her Orbit in respect of the Sun, with the Newtonian Theory . . . I proceeded to examine the mean Motion of the Moon, of her Apogee, and Nodes, to see whether they were well represented by the Tables for any considerable Number of Years . . . "

On the basis of his observations, Dunthorne proposed some adjustments of the numerical terms of the theory.

== Acceleration of the Moon ==
Dunthorne is particularly remembered for his study of the phenomenon of the changing apparent speed of The Moon in its orbit. Edmond Halley in about 1695 had already suggested on the basis of comparison between contemporary observations and on the other hand ancient records for the timing of ancient eclipses, that the Moon was very gradually accelerating in its orbit. (It was not yet known in Halley's or in Dunthorne's time that what is actually happening is a slowing-down of the Earth's rate of rotation – see Ephemeris time.) Dunthorne's computations, based in part on records of ancient accounts of eclipses, confirmed the apparent acceleration; and he was the first to quantify the effect, which he put at +10" (arcseconds/century^2) in terms of the difference of lunar longitude. Dunthorne's estimate is not far from those assessed later, e.g. in 1786 by de Lalande and still not very far away from the values from about 10" to nearly 13" being derived about a century later.

== Astronomical publications and observations ==
Dunthorne published papers in the Philosophical Transactions, including "On the motion of the Moon" (1746), "On the acceleration of the Moon" (1749), and the letter "Concerning comets" in 1751. He observed the transits of Venus in 1761 and 1769, and also published tables on the motion of Jupiter's satellites in 1762.

== Work for the Nautical Almanac ==
On 18 July 1765, the Board of Longitude (effectively led by Nevil Maskelyne) appointed Dunthorne as the first "Comparer of the Ephemeris and Corrector of the Proofs" for the (then still future) Nautical Almanac and Astronomical Ephemeris. The first issue appeared with data for the year 1767, breaking new ground in providing computational tools to enable mariners to use lunar observations to find their longitude at sea. Dunthorne worked as sole comparer for the first three issues, with data for 1767–69, and afterward continued as one of several comparers until the issue for 1776.

Dunthorne also contributed a method for clearing nautical lunar observations of the effects of refraction and parallax, for the purpose of finding the longitude at sea, and Maskelyne included this in his 'Tables requisite to be used with the Nautical Ephemeris', an accessory volume published to accompany the Nautical Almanac. It is also reported that Dunthorne in 1772 received from the Board of Longitude a reward of £50 for this contribution towards shortening the tedious calculations involved in "clearing the lunar distance" (at the same time as a similar reward was given to the contributor of an alternative method for the same purpose, Israel Lyons, 1739–1775). Improvements were added and "Dunthorne's improved method" was included in an edition of 1802.

In this area of celestial navigation, Dunthorne has been credited as the first to apply trigonometrical formulae for the general spherical triangle to the reduction of lunar distances and to give auxiliary tables for that purpose.

== Benefactions in Cambridge ==
Dunthorne planned and funded the construction of an observatory in 1765. The observatory was situated on the Shrewsbury Gate of St. John's College. Dunthorne also gave astronomical instruments to the college. The observatory remained in place until its closure in 1859.

A contemporary, Rev. William Ludlam (in charge of the St John's College observatory from 1767), described Dunthorne as one "who without the benefit of an Academical education is arrived at such a perfection in many branches of learning, and particularly in Astronomy, as would do honour to the proudest Professor in any University . . . he joined to a consummate excellence in his profession a generosity without limit in the exercise of it."

Dunthorne died at Cambridge. The crater Dunthorne on The Moon is named after him.

== Dunthorne's publications ==
- Richard Dunthorne (1739), Practical Astronomy of the Moon: or, new Tables... Exactly constructed from Sir Isaac Newton's Theory, as published by Dr Gregory in his Astronomy, London & Oxford, 1739.
- Richard Dunthorne (1746), "A Letter from Mr. Richard Dunthorne, to the Rev. Mr. Charles Mason, F. R. S. and Woodwardian Professor of Nat. Hist. at Cambridge, concerning the Moon's Motion", Philosophical Transactions, Volume 44 (1746), pp.412–420.
- Richard Dunthorne (1749), "A Letter from the Rev. Mr. Richard Dunthorne to the Reverend Mr. Richard Mason F. R. S. and Keeper of the Woodwardian Museum at Cambridge, concerning the Acceleration of the Moon", Philosophical Transactions, Vol. 46 (1749–1750) No. 492, pp. 162–172.
  -- also given in Philosophical Transactions (abridgements) (1809), vol.9 (for 1744–49), pp. 669–675 as "On the Acceleration of the Moon, by the Rev. Richard Dunthorne".
- Richard Dunthorne (1751), "A Letter from Mr. Rich. Dunthorne to the Rev. Dr. Long, F. R. S. Master of Pembroke-Hall in Cambridge, and Lowndes's Professor of Astronomy and Geometry in That University, concerning Comets", Philosophical Transactions, Volume 47 (1751), pp. 281–288.
- Richard Dunthorne (1761), "Elements of New Tables of the Motions of Jupiter's Satellites: In a Letter to the Reverend Charles Mason, D. D. Woodwardian Professor in the University of Cambridge, and F. R. S. from Mr. Richard Dunthorne", Philosophical Transactions, Volume 52 (1761), pp. 105–107.

== Other sources ==
- Mary Croarken (2002), "Providing Longitude for All", Journal of Maritime Research (National Maritime Museum, Greenwich), September 2002.
- Library of St John's College, Cambridge, (online article) mentioning Dunthorne in connection with his astronomically-related gifts to the college 1764–5, including a regulator clock by John Shelton.
- W T Lynn (1905), "Richard Dunthorne", The Observatory, vol.28 (1905), pp.215–6.
- Philosophical Transactions (Abridgement Series) (1809), vol.9 (for 1744–49) pages 669–70, (unsigned) biographical note about Richard Dunthorne.
- Frédéric Marguet (Capitaine de Vaisseau) (1931), "Histoire générale de la navigation du XVe au XXe siècle", Paris 1931, chapter 7, at page 242.
- Christof A. Plicht, "R. Dunthorne," Red Hill Observatory
- Curious About Astronomy
- "Right" Answers
- "Dunthorne, Richard" . Dictionary of National Biography. London: Smith, Elder & Co. 1885–1900.
- Maskelyne, N. (1767), Nautical Almanac and Astronomical Ephemeris, editions for 1767 and 1768; (see especially Maskelyne's Preface, acknowledging Dunthorne.
