= Capuanus (crater) =

Lunar impact crater

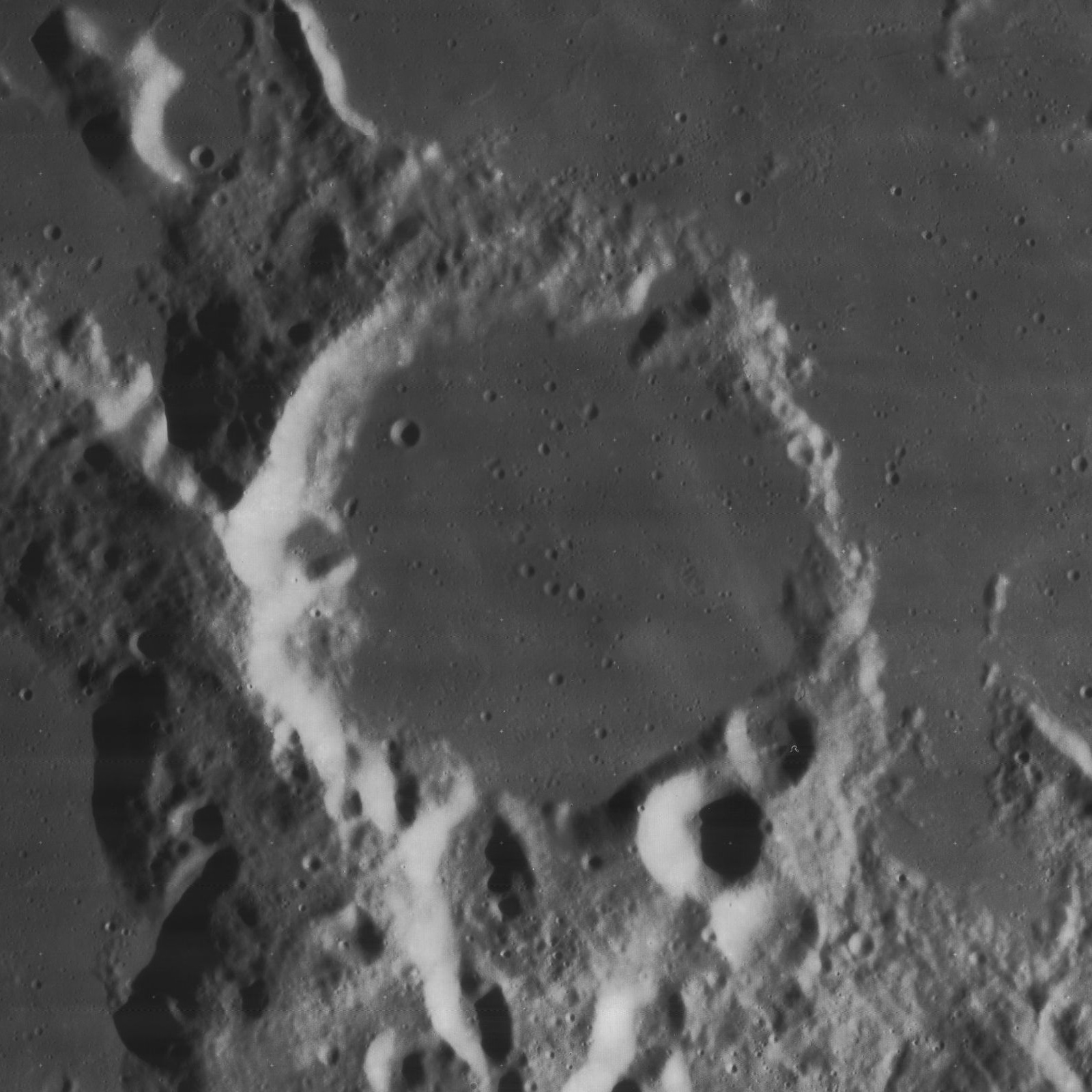
- Lunar Orbiter 4 image
- Coordinates: 34.1°S 26.7°W
- Diameter: 59.69 km (37.09 mi)
- Depth: 1.6 km (0.99 mi)
- Colongitude: 28° at sunrise
- Eponym: F. Capuano di Manfredonia

Capuanus is a lunar impact crater that lies along the southern edge of the Palus Epidemiarum. The outer rim is eroded and indented by lesser crater impacts, with notches in the north, west, and southern parts of the rim. The interior floor has been resurfaced by basaltic lava, which is connected to the surrounding lunar mare by a narrow, crater-formed gap in the northern rim. Dotting the floor of the crater are eight domes, which are believed to have formed through volcanic activity. Three instances of transient lunar phenomenon have been reported for this crater.

The rim reaches its maximum altitude along the western face, where it merges with ridges along the edge of the mare. To the northeast the rim dips down very close to the surface, and barely forms a curving ridge in the surface. The southeastern rim is overlaid by a pair of craters.

To the north of Capuanus is the western extreme of the wide rille named Rima Hesiodus, which runs to the east-northeast. To the west-northwest is the crater Ramsden, and between Capuanus and Ramsden lies a system of intersecting rilles named the Rimae Ramsden.

This crater was named after the 15th century Italian astronomer F. Capuano di Manfredonia. His name was incorporated into lunar nomenclature by Italian astronomer Giovanni B. Riccioli in 1651, but it was assigned to the formation now known as Ramsden and this crater was designated Cichus. Its modern designation was officially adopted by the International Astronomical Union in 1935.

== Satellite craters ==
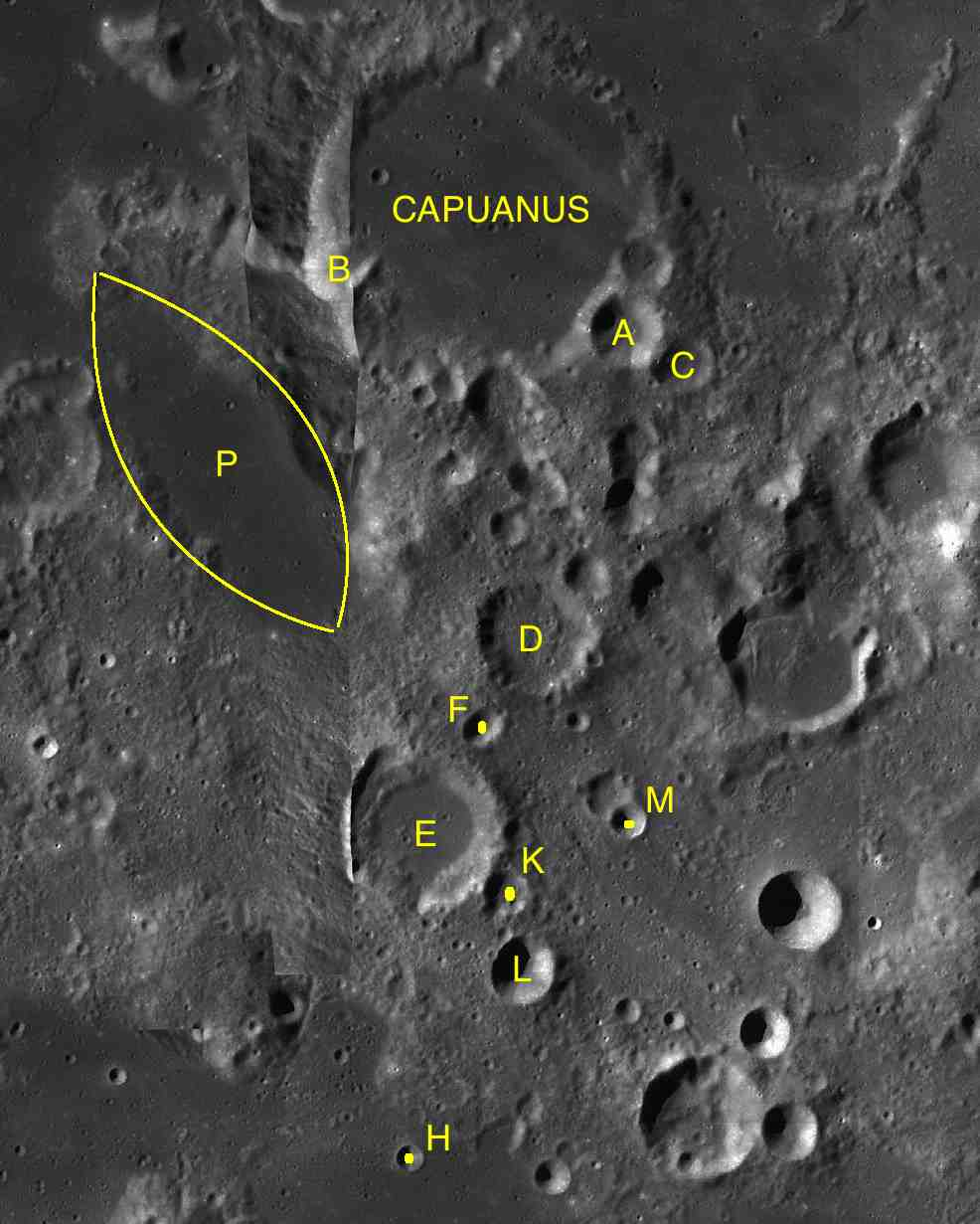
Capuanus and its satellite craters

By convention these features are identified on lunar maps by placing the letter on the side of the crater midpoint that is closest to Capuanus.

Capuanus	Latitude	Longitude	Diameter
A	34.7° S	25.6° W	13 km
B	34.3° S	27.7° W	11 km
C	34.9° S	25.3° W	10 km
D	36.4° S	26.2° W	22 km
E	37.5° S	27.1° W	29 km
F	36.9° S	26.6° W	8 km
H	39.4° S	27.2° W	4 km
K	37.9° S	26.5° W	9 km
L	38.3° S	26.3° W	11 km
M	37.5° S	25.6° W	7 km
P	35.3° S	28.3° W	78 km

Both Capuanus A and Capuanus L are young craters.
