= Ismaël Bullialdus =

French astronomer (1605–1694)

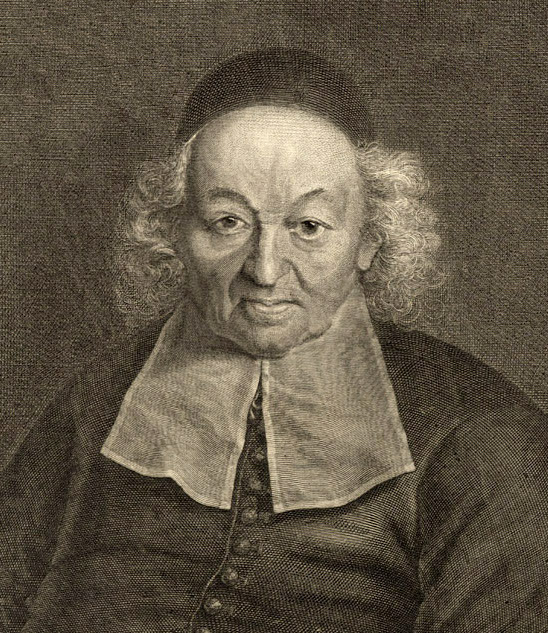
- Portrait by Pieter van Schuppen
- Born: 28 September 1605; Loudun, France
- Died: 25 November 1694 (aged 89); Abbey St. Victor, Paris, France
- Other names: Ismaël Boulliau, Ismaël Boulliaud, Ismaël Boullian
- Occupation: Astronomer
- Known for: Astronomia Philolaica and Republic of Letters correspondences

Ismaël Boulliau (French: [buljo]; Latin: Ismaël Bullialdus; 28 September 1605 – 25 November 1694) was a 17th-century French astronomer, mathematician, and Catholic priest, who was also interested in history, theology, classical studies, and philology. He was an active member of the Republic of Letters, an intellectual community that exchanged ideas. An early defender of the ideas of Nicolaus Copernicus, Johannes Kepler and Galileo Galilei, Ismael Bullialdus has been called "the most noted astronomer of his generation" whose renown is perhaps best exemplified by the claim of 1979 Nobel laureate in Physics Steven Weinberg that in 1640 Bullialdus made "the first suggestion of an inverse-square law." One of his books is Astronomia Philolaica (1645).

== Life and career ==
Ismael Bullialdus was the second-born to his Calvinist parents, Susanna Motet and Ismael Bullialdus. His father was a notary by profession and an amateur astronomer who made observations in Loudun, France. His older brother was originally named after their father Ismael, but died shortly after birth.

At the age of 21, Bullialdus converted to Roman Catholicism and was ordained a priest at age 26. One year later, in 1632, he moved to Paris. Enjoying the patronage of the de Thou family, Bullialdus worked for 30 years in Paris as a librarian associated with the brothers Jacques and Pierre Dupuy, who were working on the Bibliothèque du Roi (Bibliothe), France's first royal library. After the death of his employers, the brothers Dupuy, Bullialdus became secretary to the French ambassador of Holland. After a dispute with him in 1666, however, he once again moved, this time to the Collège de Laon, where he worked again as a librarian.

Bullialdus published his first work De Natura Lucis in 1638, which he followed with many more published works, ranging from books to published correspondence during his time involved with the Republic of Letters. He was one of the earliest members to be elected as a foreign associate into the Royal Society of London on April 4, 1667, only seven years after the Society was founded. He spent the last five years of his life as a priest, the same occupation in which he started his career.

He retired to the Abbey St. Victor in Paris, where he died at the age of 89.

Bullialdus crater on the Moon was named after him.

== Involvement in the Republic of Letters ==
Bullialdus was an active member of the Republic of Letters, the long-distance intellectual correspondence network that had emerged as an international community of self-proclaimed scholars and literary figures. Bullialdus was a prolific correspondent, with around 5,000 letters that have survived to this day. His letters demonstrate the geographic reach of the Republic of Letters; he corresponded with scholars not only in nearby countries like Holland and Italy, but also in Scandinavia, Poland, and the Near East. Around 4,200 of them are in the Collection Boulliau of the Bibliothèque nationale de France (formerly the "Bibliothèque du Roi") with another 800 to or from him that are outside the collection in 45 different archives in nearly a dozen countries. Unfortunately, many of his manuscripts are lost; shortly after his death, his entire library—books, manuscripts and correspondence—was dispersed.

The most famous of the known letters included in the original Archive Boulliau include correspondence with notable thinkers, including Galileo, Marin Mersenne, Henry Oldenburg, Christiaan Huygens, Pierre de Fermat, and Arcangela Tarabotti. Bullialdus' correspondence with the cloistered Tarabotti was instrumental to the posthumous publication of her works. In addition to his own letters, Bullialdus contributed to "The Archives of the Scientific Revolution". Among Bullialdus's papers were notes and examinations of rare manuscripts. Also found among his letters were copies of his contemporaries' manuscripts which he had preserved. Arguably most notable were the ten volumes of original autographs addressed to Nicolas-Claude Fabri de Peiresc.

In Bk I, Ch. XII of Astronomia Philolaica (1645), Bullialdus wrote the following:

As for the power by which the Sun seizes or holds the planets, and which, being corporeal, functions in the manner of hands, it is emitted in straight lines throughout the whole extent of the world, and like the species of the Sun, it turns with the body of the Sun; now, seeing that it is corporeal, it becomes weaker and attenuated at a greater distance or interval, and the ratio of its decrease in strength is the same as in the case of light, namely, the duplicate proportion, but inversely, of the distances [that is, 1/d²].

This has led to his questionable recognition by some as the "finder, not the keeper" of the inverse-square law.

== Principal works ==
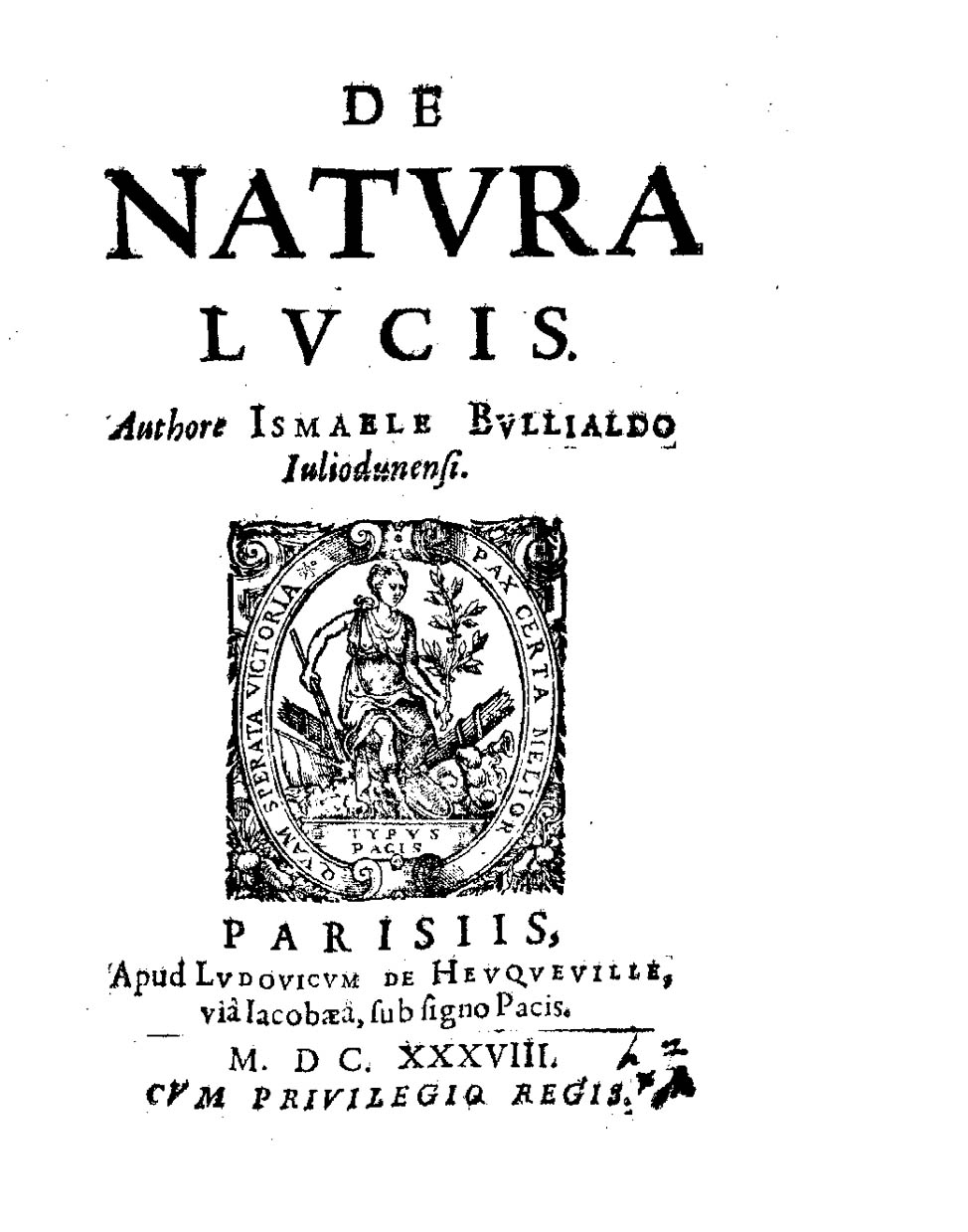
De natura lucis, 1638

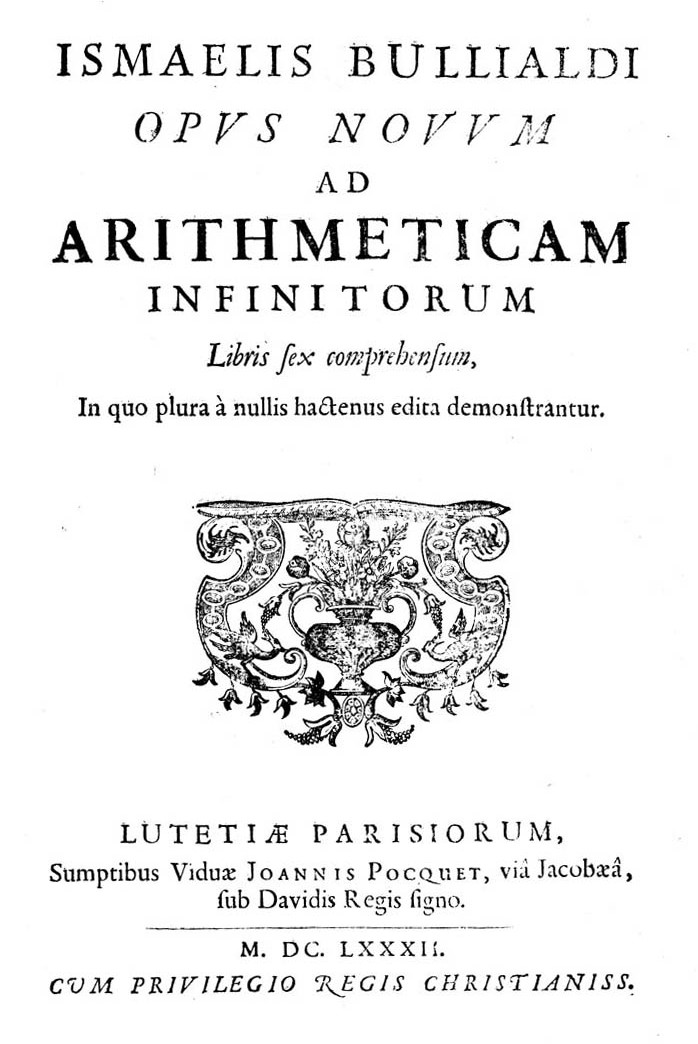
Opus novum ad arithmeticam infinitorum libris sex comprehensum, 1682

- De natura lucis (1638)
- Philolaus (1639)
- Expositio rerum mathematicarum ad legendum Platonem utilium, translation of Theon of Smyrna (1644)
- Astronomia philolaica (1645) e-rara.ch
- De lineis spiralibus (1657)
- Opus novum ad arithmeticam infinitorum (1682)
- Ad astronomos monita duo (1667)

Ismael Bullialdus's most famous work is Astronomia Philolaica. Published in 1645, the book is considered by some modern-day historians of science to be the most important book in astronomy between Kepler and Isaac Newton. The book widened the awareness of Kepler's planetary ellipses, however, whereas Kepler used a physical cause to explain planetary motion, and called on math and science to support his theory, Bullialdus offered an entirely new cosmology, the "Conical Hypothesis".

=== Assumptions of Philolaic Astronomy ===
Bullialdus's Philolaic Astronomy consists of 14 main assumptions:

1. Planets have a simple motion in a simple line.
2. Planetary revolutions are equal, perpetual, uniform.
3. They should be regular revolutions or composed of regular revolutions.
4. They can only be circular.
5. Or composed of circles.
6. Motions should have a principle of equality.
7. Since they admit of a certain inequality, the center of the zodiac must be the reference point of inequality.
8. This point is in the sun.
9. Half of the inequality is attributed to eccentricity, the other to another cause which makes the planet slower at aphelion, less slow at perihelion, without disturbing the equality of motion or transposing it to some other place, whether the circle or the surface.
10. When the planet, moving from aphelion, comes to quadrature on the same surface, with equal motion, it should differ from the apparent motion of the first inequality completely or nearly so; but because the other half [of the inequality] is due to the distance [between] the circles, the center of planetary motion must be between the points of true and apparent motion.
11. Since the equal motion in the first quadrant is greater than the apparent motion, that part of apparent motion must be greater, hence from the first quadrant to perihelion the arc described going to perihelion must be larger than the first.
12. All revolution is composed of circular parts; the same is true of each part.
13. Equal motion is uniform; thus, the motion in coming from aphelion corresponds to the larger parallel circles, which increase from aphelion to perihelion. This equal motion does not correspond to a single circle, but to several unequal circles to which the apparent motion also corresponds; the apparent motion includes all the circles on the same surface. The motion must [also] be eccentric and inclined.
14. These circles follow one another in a continuous series and are all parallel among themselves; they do not overlap or enclose one another; the apparent motion forms a solid surface containing larger and smaller circles.

Boulliau's Conical Hypothesis [RA Hatch]

=== Bullialdus's hypothesis ===
- Conical Hypothesis: "The Planets, according to that astronomer [Boulliau], always revolve in circles; for that being the most perfect figure, it is impossible they should revolve in any other. No one of them, however, continues to move in any one circle, but is perpetually passing from one to another, through an infinite number of circles, in the course of each revolution; for an ellipse, said he, is an oblique section of a cone, and in a cone, betwixt the vertices of the ellipse there is an infinite number of circles, out of the infinitely small portions of which the elliptical line is compounded. The Planet, therefore, which moves in this line, is, in every point of it, moving in an infinitely small portion of a certain circle. The motion of each Planet, too, according to him, was necessarily, for the same reason, perfectly equable. An equable motion being the most perfect of all motions. It was not, however, in the elliptical line, that it was equable, but in any one of the circles that were parallel to the base of that cone, by whose section this elliptical line had been formed: for, if a ray was extended from the Planet to any one of those circles, and carried along by its periodical motion, it would cut off equal portions of that circle in equal times; another most fantastical equalizing circle, supported by no other foundation besides the frivolous connection betwixt a cone and an ellipse, and recommended by nothing but the natural passion for circular orbits and equable motions," (Adam Smith, History of Astronomy, IV.55-57).

== See also ==
- List of Roman Catholic scientist-clerics
- Republic of Letters
