= Johann Nepomuk Krieger =

German draftsman and astronomer (1865–1902)

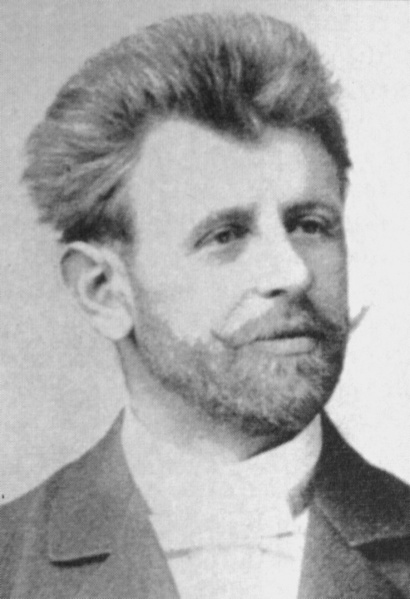
- Born: 4 February 1865; Unterwiesenbach, Kingdom of Bavaria
- Died: 10 February 1902 (aged 37); Sanremo, Italy
- Known for: selenography
- Scientific career
- Fields: selenography, astronomy

Johann Nepomuk Krieger (4 February 1865, Unterwiesenbach – 10 February 1902, Sanremo) was a draftsman and selenographer who produced detailed hand-drawn maps of the lunar surface at his Italian observatory.

== Biography ==
Krieger was born on 4 February 1865 in the Kingdom of Bavaria, the son of a master brewer. At an early age he gained an interest in astronomy. He only received school education up to the age of 15, when he departed. However he gained an inheritance, and used the money to build an observatory in the suburbs of Munich. He had been inspired by the director of the Cologne Observatory, Hermann Klein, to make the study and observation of the Moon his life's work.

Krieger decided to create a definitive map of the Moon. For this purpose he obtained a series of low-resolution negatives of the lunar surface that had been taken at the Lick and Paris observatories. He enlarged these images and used them to provide positional accuracy for his subsequent drawings. His illustrations of the Moon were made in charcoal, graphite pencil, and ink, and were considered superior to any previously produced lunar maps in their accuracy and level of detail, and continue to be considered works of art.

He lived long enough to see his first 28 plates published as volume 1 of his "Mond Atlas". However his health had suffered, possibly due to his long nightly labors at his telescope. About 10 years following his death, his remaining drawings and sketches were published in a second volume by the Austrian selenographer Rudolf König.

== Honors ==
Crater Krieger on the Moon and the nearby feature Rima Krieger are named in his honor. Asteroid 614 Pia is thought to have been named for Krieger's Pia Observatory (German: Pia Sternwarte; Italian: Osservatorio Pia) in Trieste, Italy, which was named by Krieger after his wife, Pia.
