= Palus Epidemiarum =

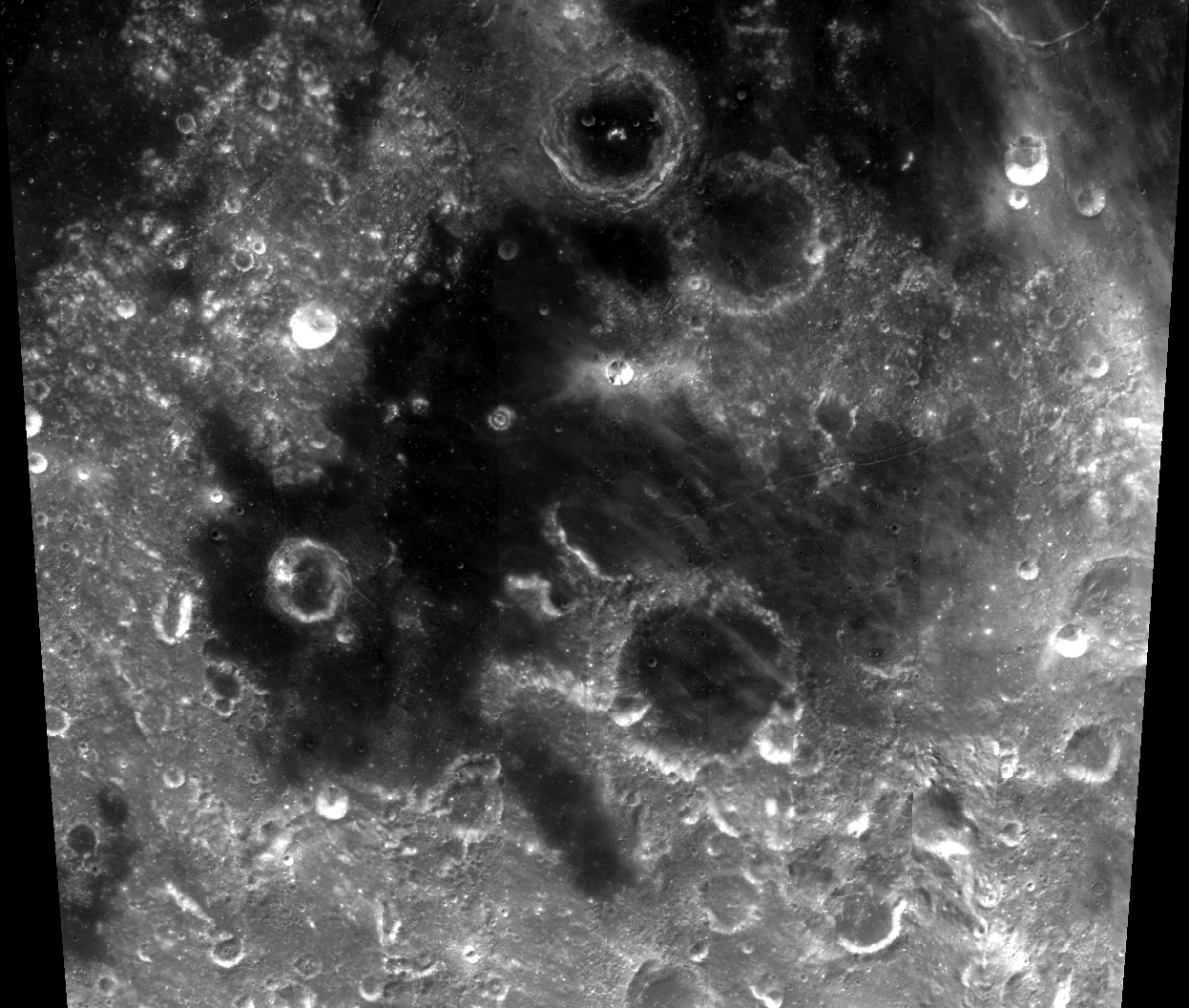
- Coordinates: 32.0°S 28.2°W
- Diameter: 286 km
- Eponym: Marsh of Epidemics

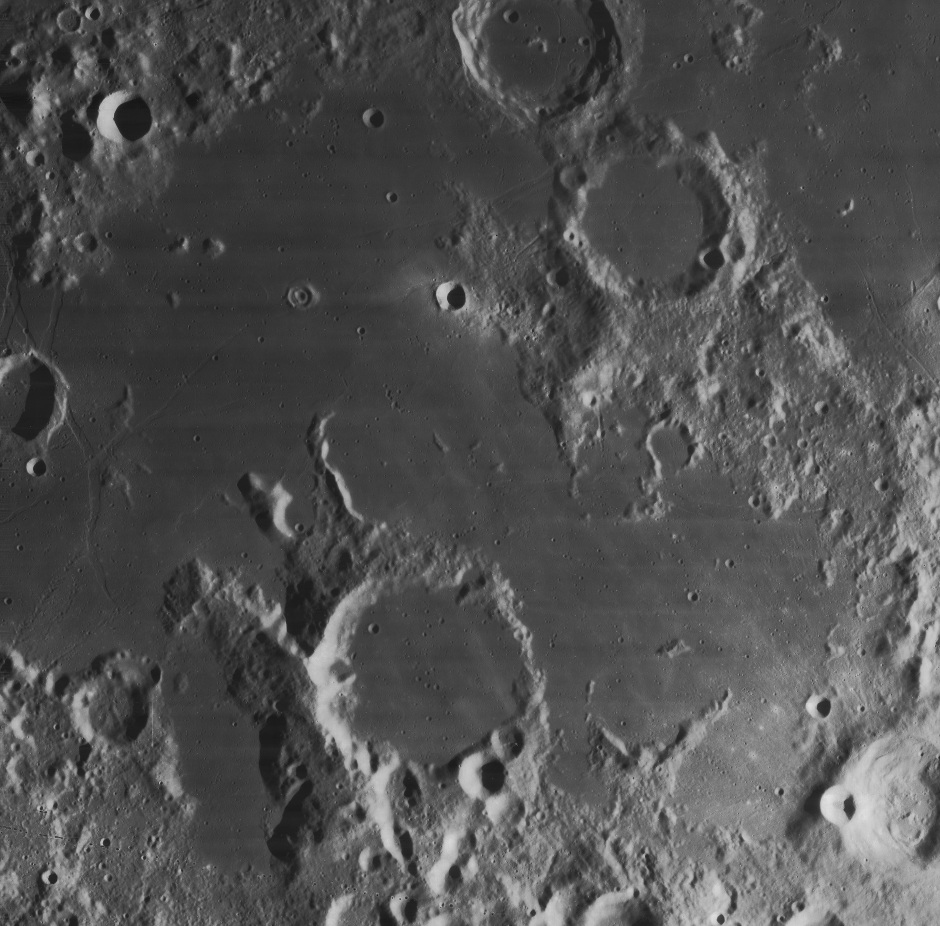
Lunar Orbiter 4 image from 1967

Palus Epidemiarum /ˈpeɪləs ɛpɪdiːmiˈɛərəm/ (Latin palūs epidēmiārum Marsh of Epidemics) is a small lunar mare in the southwestern part of the Moon's near side. This feature forms a rough band of lava-flooded terrain that runs generally west–east, with a northward extension near the western end. It spans a shallow trough extending 300 by 120 km. The average thickness of the basalt is 200–250 m, with a maximum depth of 750 m. The feature lies to the southwest of Mare Nubium, and southeast of Mare Humorum.

This mare is notable for a system of rilles in the western end named the Rimae Ramsden, and for the wide Rima Hesiodus that extends from near the midpoint to the east-northeast roughly 300 km. The flooded crater Capuanus occupies the southern center of the Palus Epidemiarum, and is attached to the southern edge. Near the western end is the flooded crater Ramsden, after which the Rimae Ramsden are named. The crater Cichus forms the eastern end of the mare.

The northern extension of the mare reaches the outer rims of the crater pair Campanus and Mercator. A narrow valley between these craters joins Palus Epidemiarum with Mare Nubium, and a rille from the Rimae Ramsden follows the course of this cleft. The small double-walled crater Marth lies at the southern midpoint of this northern extension.

The selenographic coordinates of this feature are 32.0° S, 28.2° W, and it is enclosed within a diameter of 286 km. Altimetry data from the Clementine spacecraft shows that this feature slopes downward from west to east, with a height difference of 2 km from end to end.

== See also ==
- Volcanism on the Moon
