= Thomas William Webb =

British astronomer and clergyman (1807-1885)

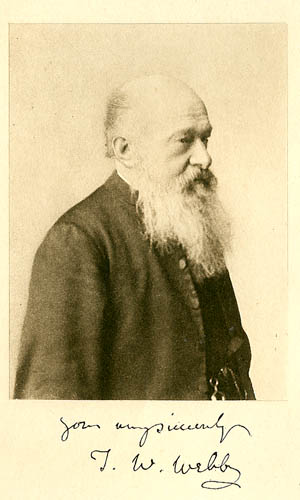
T. W. Webb, from the coverplate in the 1917 edition of Celestial Objects for Common Telescopes

Thomas William Webb (14 December 1807 – 19 May 1885) was a British astronomer. Some sources give his year of birth as 1806. The only son of a clergyman, the Reverend John Webb, he was raised and educated by his father, his mother having died while Thomas was a small child. He went to Oxford where he attended Magdalen Hall. In 1829 was ordained a minister in the Anglican Church. He was married to Henrietta Montague Wyatt (1820–1884) in 1843, daughter of Mr. Arthur Wyatt, Monmouth. Mrs. Webb died on 7 September 1884, and after a year of declining health Thomas died on 19 May 1885.

Through his career T. W. Webb served as a clergyman at various places including Gloucester, and finally in 1852 was assigned to the parish of Hardwicke in Herefordshire near the border with Wales. In addition to serving faithfully the members of his parish, T. W. Webb pursued astronomical observation in his spare time. On the grounds of the vicarage or parsonage he built a small canvas and wood observatory that was home to instruments including a small 3.7 in (94 mm) refracting telescope. Webb acquired progressively larger refractors and reflectors, the largest was a 9 1/3 inches (240 mm) aperture silver on glass reflector used from 1866 until his last observation in March 1885. It was at Hardwick that he wrote his classic astronomical observing guide Celestial Objects for Common Telescopes in 1859 for which he is best known today. This work was written as a guide for the amateur astronomer, containing instructions on the use of a telescope as well as detailed descriptions of what could be observed with it. This work became the standard observing guide of amateur astronomers worldwide, and remained so until well into the 20th century, gradually supplanted by more modern guides such as Burnham's Celestial Handbook.

The title's reference to "common telescopes" refers to refractors of 3 to 6 inches (76 to 152 millimetres) aperture and the somewhat larger reflectors that were commonly available to the amateur observers of the day.

In 1852 Webb was elected to the Royal Astronomical Society. Celestial Objects for Common Telescopes was first published in 1859. Successive editions appeared in 1868, 1873, and 1881. In 1878 Webb was an initial member of the Selenographical Society. After Webb's death in 1885 the 5th (1893) and 6th editions (1917) were produced under the aegis of T H E C Espin (1858–1934) and expanded to two volumes. In 1962, the reprinted edition was published by Dover Publications, Inc., edited and revised by Margaret W. Mayall. The 1962 edition is still readily available and widely used, while earlier editions have become collector's items and are quite rare.

Webb also wrote Optics Without Mathematics (1883) and The Sun: A Familiar Description of His Phenomena (1885).

Asteroid 3041 Webb and lunar crater Webb were named after him.

A telescopic asterism in the constellation Hercules is called Webb's wreath by amateur astronomers.
