= Nicollet (crater) =

Crater on the Moon

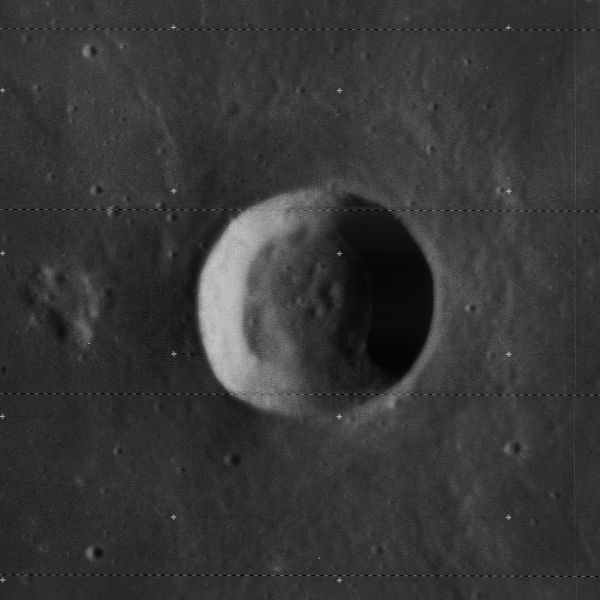
- Lunar Orbiter 4 image
- Coordinates: 21.9°S 12.5°W
- Diameter: 15 km
- Depth: 1.93 km (1.20 mi)
- Colongitude: 13° at sunrise
- Eponym: Joseph Nicollet

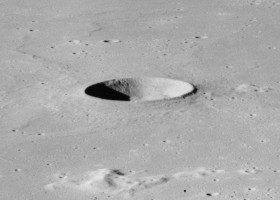
Oblique view facing south from Apollo 16

Nichollet is a small, isolated lunar impact crater on the Mare Nubium, a lunar mare in the southwest quadrant of the Moon. It was named after French astronomer Joseph Nicollet. This crater is located to the north of the crater Pitatus, about midway between Wolf to the west and Birt to the east.

This is a circular, bowl-shaped crater with a rim raised above the surface of the surrounding lava plain. The inner walls slope down to the interior floor, with the bottom having a diameter about half that of the crater. Some wrinkle ridges lie in the surface of the nearby mare, joining with the outer rim. These features are best observed under oblique lighting conditions when the terminator has just moved past the crater during the waxing phase.

== Satellite craters ==
By convention these features are identified on lunar maps by placing the letter on the side of the crater midpoint that is closest to Nicollet.

Nicollet	Latitude	Longitude	Diameter
B	20.1° S	13.5° W	5 km
D	23.2° S	12.2° W	2 km
