= Opelt =

Opelt is a surname. Notable people with the surname include:

- Friedrich Wilhelm Opelt (1794–1863), German musicologist, mathematician, and astronomer
- Ulrich Opelt, German canoeist

== See also ==
- Opelt (crater), a lunar impact crater on the Mare Nubium (Moon)
- Oppelt
