= Thebit (crater) =

Crater on the Moon

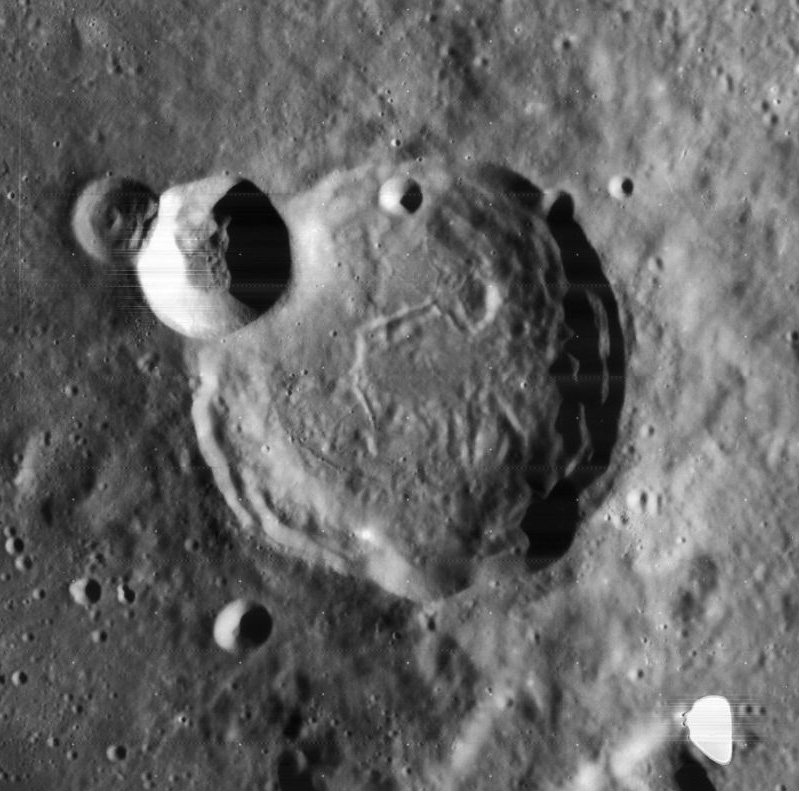
- Lunar Orbiter 4 image
- Coordinates: 22.0°S 4.0°W
- Diameter: 57 km
- Depth: 3.36 km (2.09 mi)
- Colongitude: 5° at sunrise
- Formation: Upper Imbrian
- Eponym: Thābit ibn Qurra

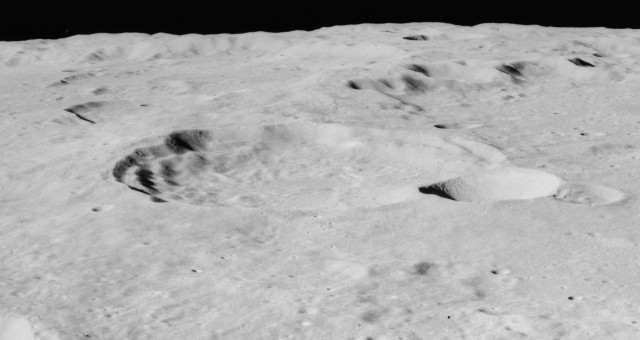
Oblique Apollo 16 image

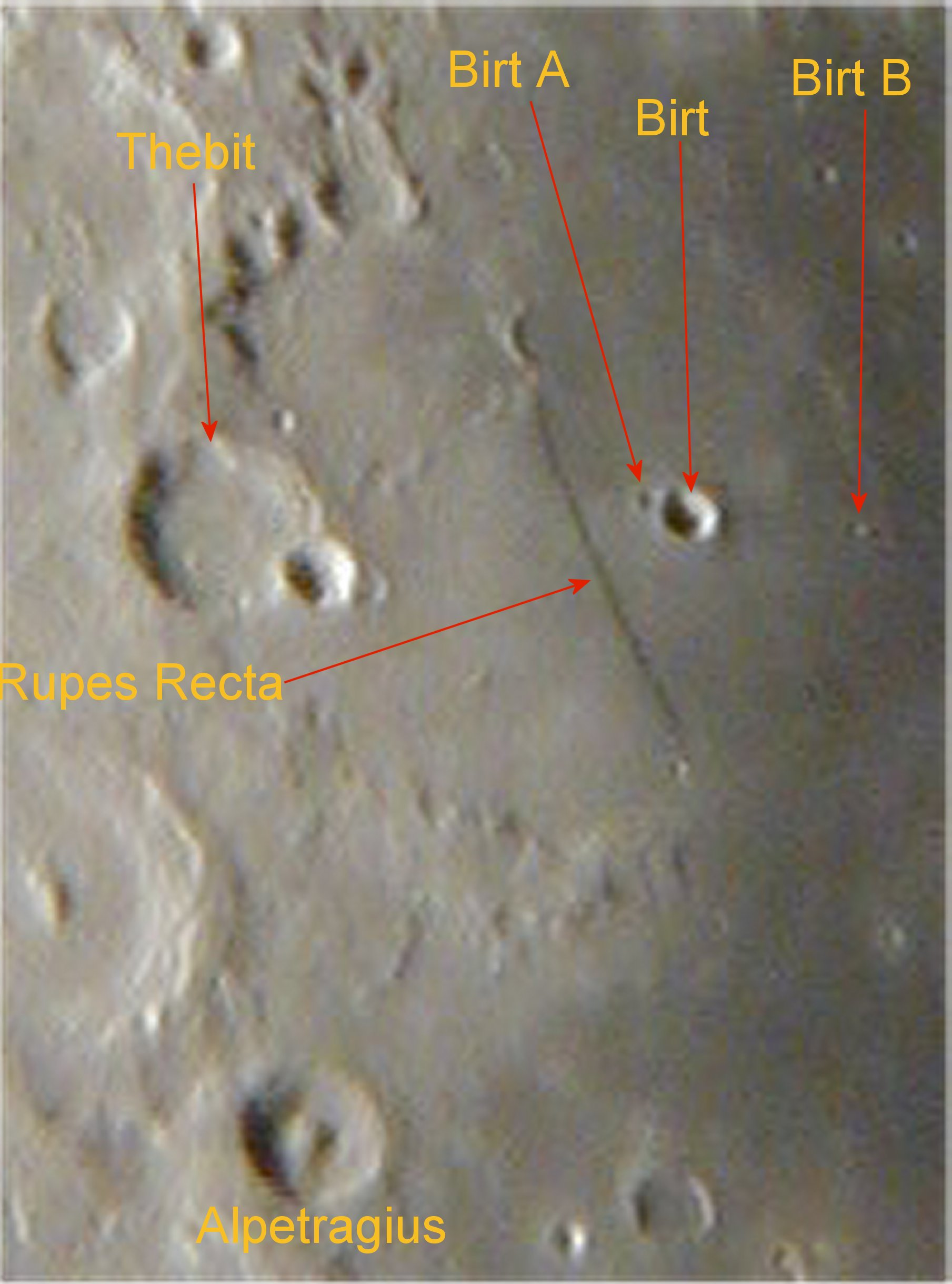
Other craters near Thebit

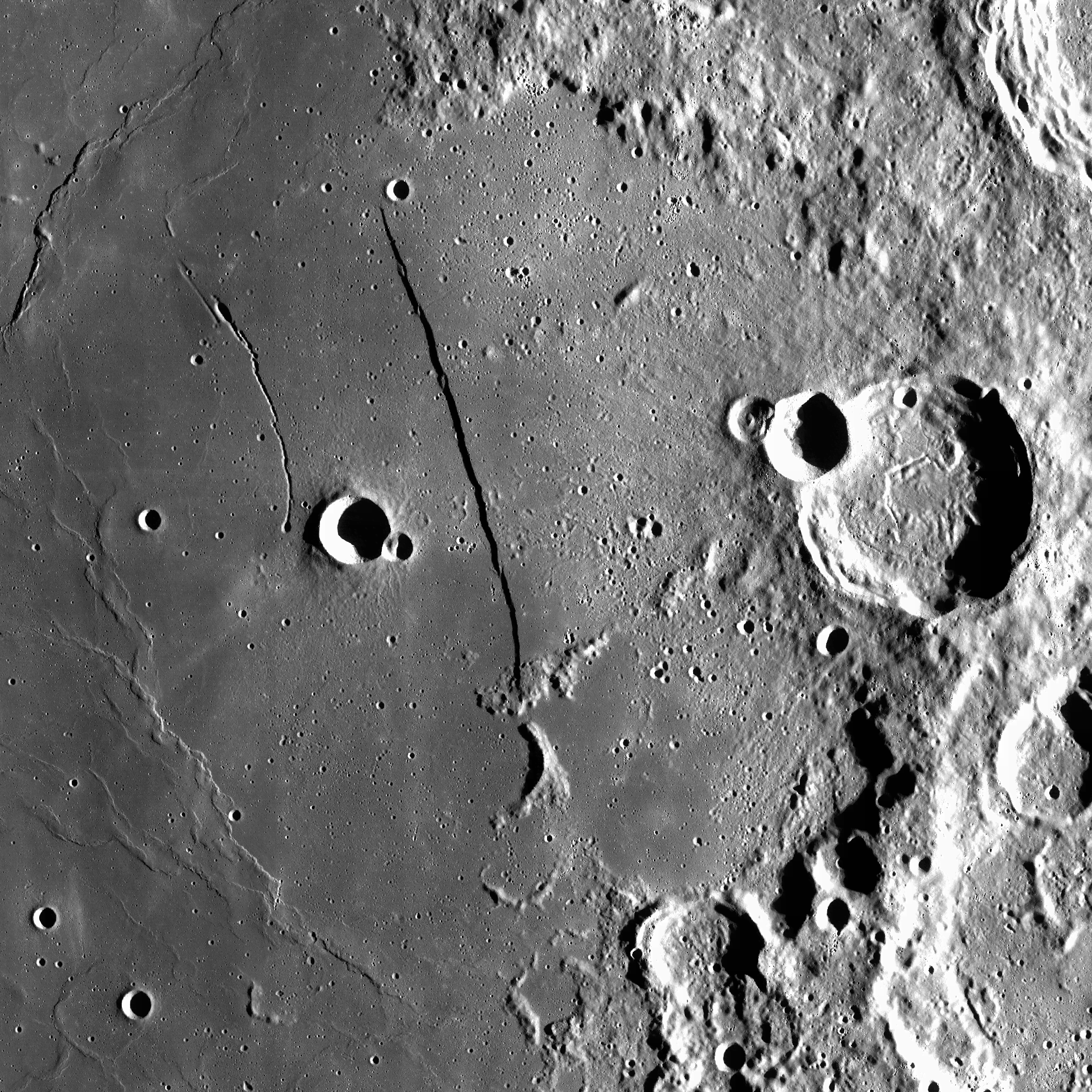
Ancient Thebit (LRO mosaic)

Thebit is a lunar impact crater located on the southeast shore of Mare Nubium. To the north-northwest is the crater Arzachel, and Purbach lies to the south-southwest. To the southwest is the flooded remnants of Thebit P, which is actually larger in diameter than Thebit itself.

On the lunar geologic timescale, Thebit is a crater of Upper (Late) Imbrian age. The rim of Thebit is generally circular in outline, with a double-notch in the southwest wall. A prominent bowl-shaped crater, Thebit A, lies across the west-northwestern rim. The west-northwestern rim of this crater is overlain in turn by the even smaller Thebit L. Together this forms an elegant arrangement that makes Thebit relatively simple to identify. The floor of Thebit crater is rough and has no central peak. The rim displays a terrace, and has a hilly outer rampart.

Due west of Thebit is a 110-kilometer-long ridge named Rupes Recta, which rises to 240 meters. This linear feature runs north-northwest to south-southeast across the Mare Nubium.

Thebit lies on the eastern rim of a much older, 220-km diameter crater informally known as "Ancient Thebit." Its eroded rim is still present to the northwest and southwest of Thebit, and unnamed wrinkle ridges in Mare Nubium may correlate with the western rim that is now buried by mare lava. The Rupes Recta, Birt, and Rima Birt are all within Ancient Thebit.

Thebit is a Latinization of the name of the 9th century Harranian astronomer and mathematician Thābit ibn Qurra.

== Satellite craters ==
By convention these features are identified on lunar maps by placing the letter on the side of the crater midpoint that is closest to Thebit.

Thebit	Latitude	Longitude	Diameter
A	21.5° S	4.9° W	20 km
B	22.3° S	6.2° W	4 km
C	21.2° S	4.1° W	6 km
D	19.8° S	8.3° W	5 km
E	23.1° S	4.6° W	7 km
F	23.0° S	5.3° W	4 km
J	22.5° S	5.5° W	10 km
K	23.1° S	3.7° W	5 km
L	21.5° S	5.4° W	12 km
P	24.0° S	5.7° W	78 km
Q	20.1° S	4.2° W	16 km
R	20.2° S	4.8° W	9 km
S	24.8° S	7.2° W	16 km
T	20.7° S	6.0° W	3 km
U	20.3° S	5.8° W	4 km

== See also ==
- Albategnius (crater)
