= Rupes Recta =

Linear fault on the Moon

Coordinates: 22.1°S 7.8°W

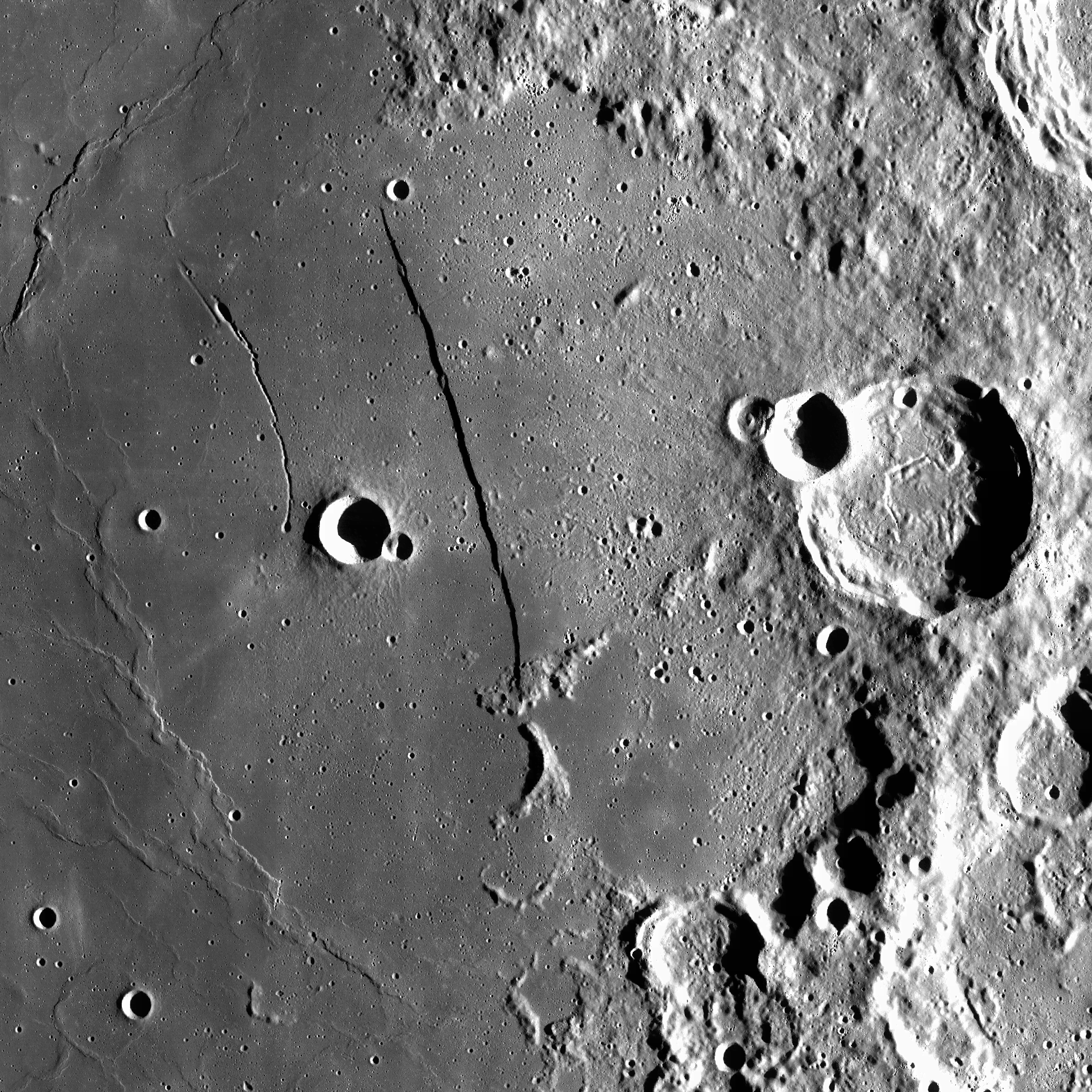
Rupes Recta (center) by LRO

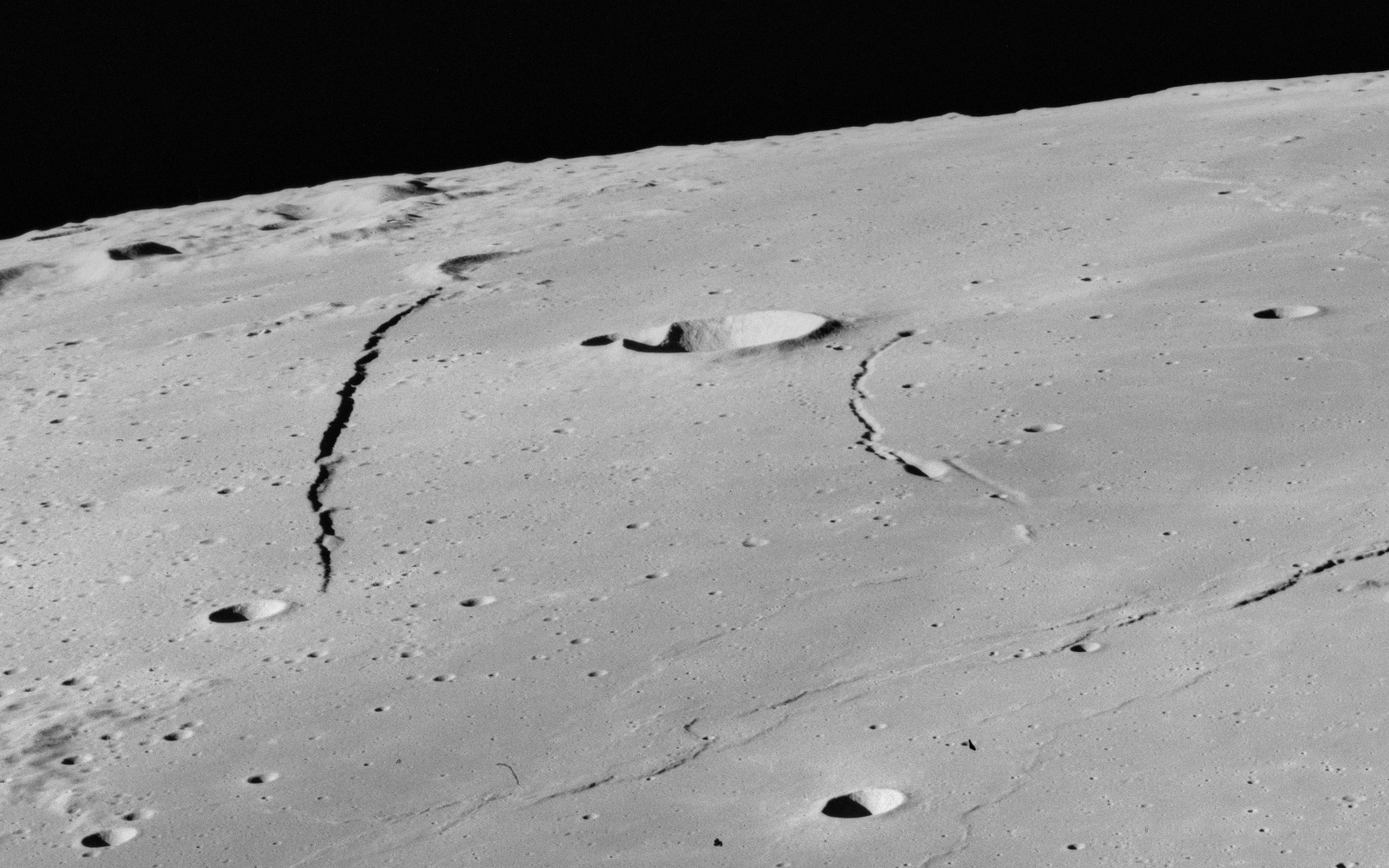
Oblique view of Rupes Recta (left), Birt (center), and Rima Birt (right), from Apollo 16

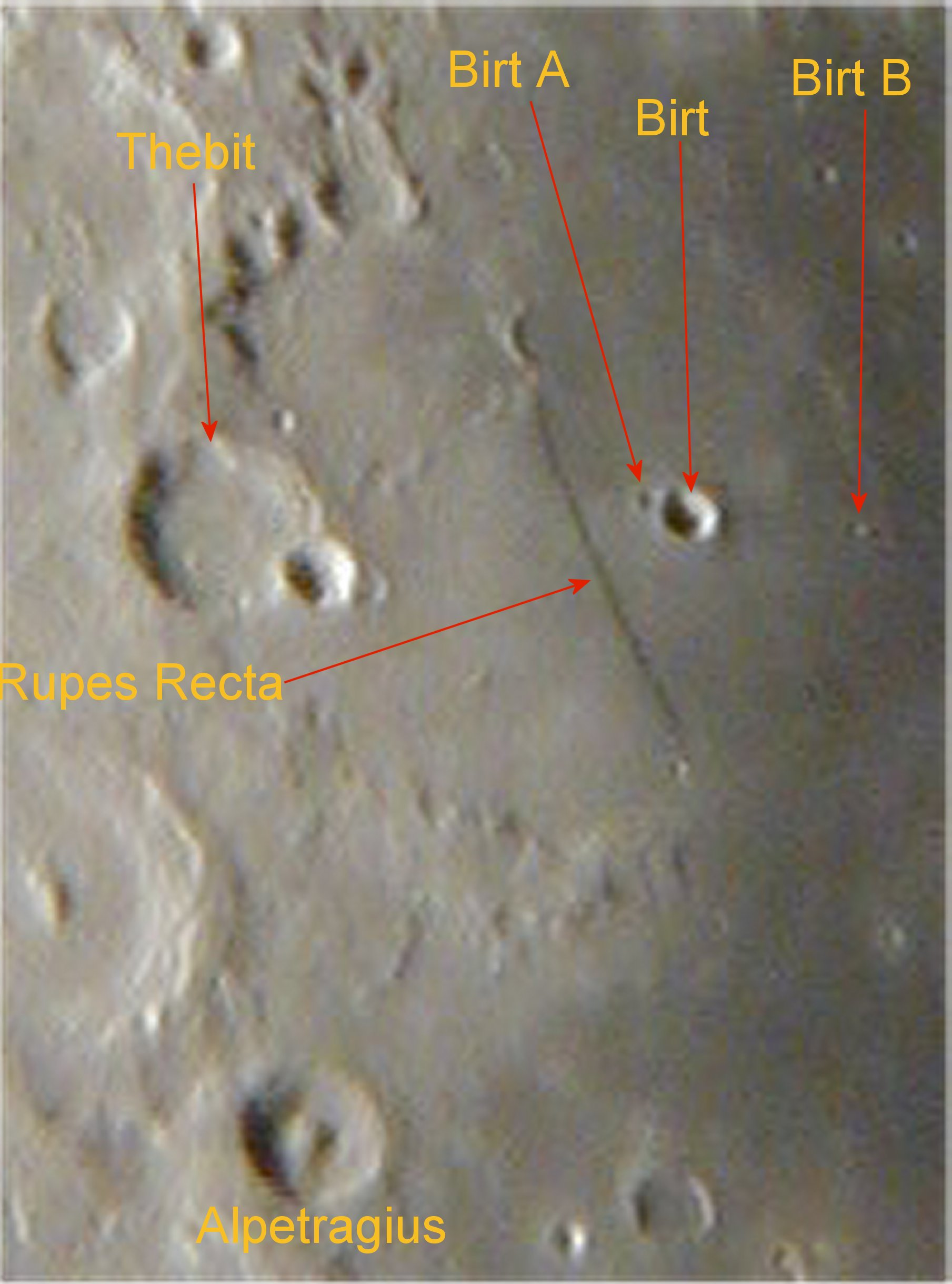
View of the Rupes Recta region taken with a digital camera and a 4.5" telescope. Since this is a telescopic view, this image is inverted.

Rupes Recta is a linear fault on the Moon, in the southeastern part of the Mare Nubium. It is the best-known escarpment on the Moon, and a popular target for amateur astronomers.

== Names ==
The name is Latin for Straight Cliff, although it is more commonly called the Straight Wall. Rupes Recta was observed and illustrated in 1686 by Christiaan Huygens who likened it to a sword, and it is referred to as Épée de Huygens (Sword of Huygens) in French. It is also traditionally called the Railway by British astronomers.

== Appearance ==
When the sun illuminates Rupes Recta at an oblique angle at about day 8 of the Moon's orbit (first quarter), the feature casts a wide shadow that gives it the appearance of a steep cliff. At the time of last quarter, Rupes Recta appears as a bright line. The fault has a length of 114 km, a typical width of 2–3 km, and a height of 240–300 m. Thus although it appears to be a vertical cliff in the lunar surface, in actuality the grade of the slope is relatively shallow, with an inclination estimated around 10 degrees.

== Geology ==
Rupes Recta is a tectonic feature which was formed when the western side (with crater Birt) of the mare's surface dropped down several hundred metres compared to the other. This may have been initiated by shocks from the Mare Imbrium impact and later deformed by the Mare Nubium lava flows. The fault extends to a depth of around 42 km with a fault dip of approximately 85 degrees. It is estimated to be at most 3.2 billion years old, making it possibly the youngest normal fault on the Moon.

== Surroundings ==
To the west of Rupes Recta is the crater Birt, which is about 17 km in diameter. Also to the west is the Rima Birt rille, with origin possibly related to that of Rupes Recta. To the north of Rupes Recta lies Promontorium Taenarium. To the northeast is the crater Alpetragius, and to the east is Thebit. At the southern end is a 17 km-long crescent-shaped group of hills often called the Stag's Horn Mountains, although this name is not officially recognized by the IAU.

== Exploration ==
In 2018, researchers from the Korea Institute of Geoscience and Mineral Resources used radar sounder observations of Rupes Recta by the Japanese orbiter SELENE to demonstrate 5 MHz imaging of lunar surface, concluding that this technique could be used for imaging shallow lava tubes, although no such features were found in the Rupes Recta region.

In 2021, researchers from the Chungnam National University and the Korea Aerospace Research Institute proposed using a quadruped walking robot for exploring the stratigraphy of Rupes Recta. They argue that a legged robot would be better suited for navigating the sloped terrain of the fault than a wheeled vehicle.

== Culture ==
In 2005, Italian author Clelia Farris won the Fantascienza.com award for her debut science fiction novel entitled Rupes Recta about the hunt for a killer on the Moon.

== See also ==
- Golden Handle – Visual effect on the Moon
