= Wolf Crater =

Wolf Crater may refer to:

- Wolf (crater), on the Moon
- Wolfe Creek Crater, Western Australia
