= Luca Gaurico =

Italian mathematician and astronomer (1475–1558)

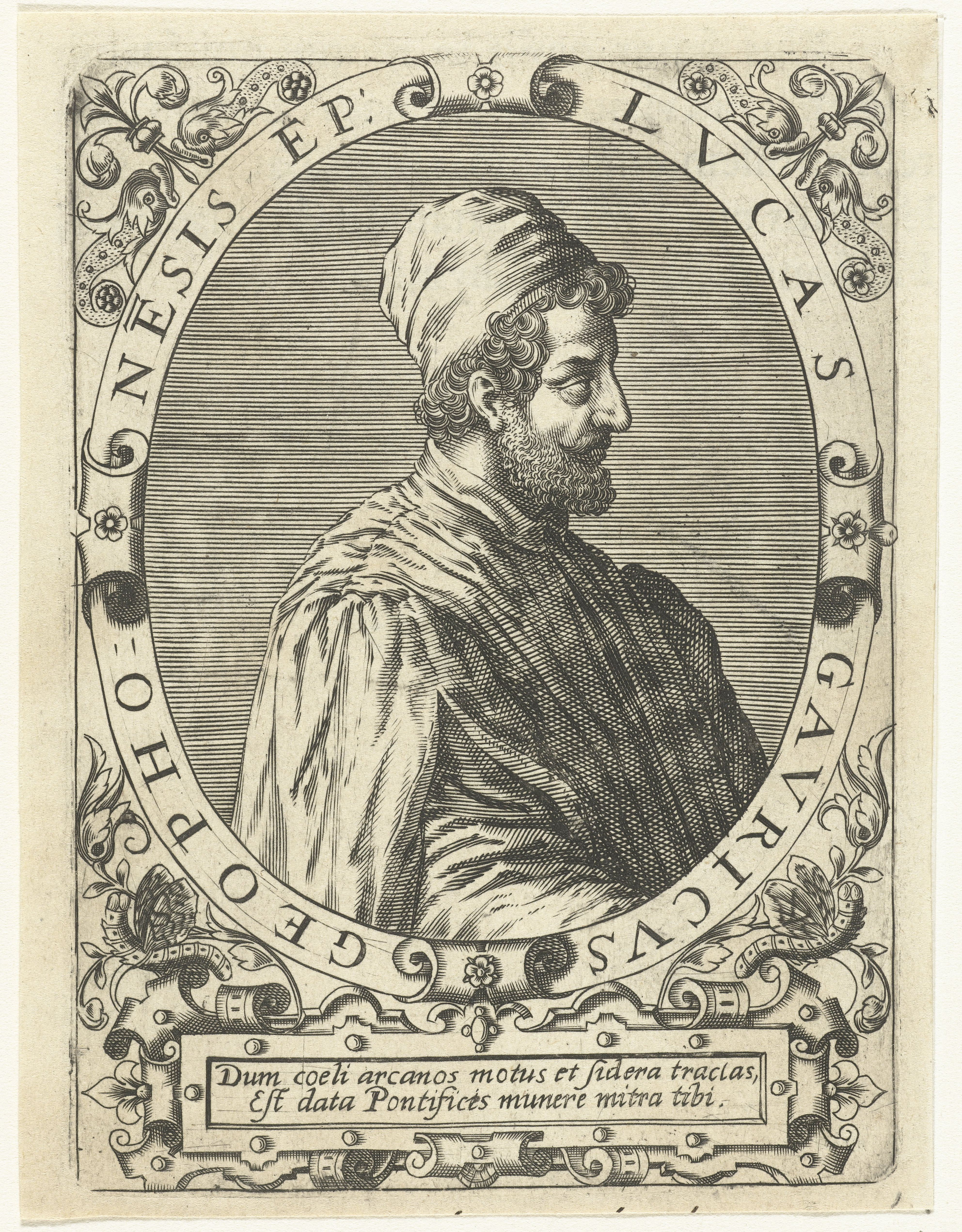
Luca Gaurico

Luca Gaurico (in Latin, Lucas Gauricus) (Giffoni March 12, 1475 – March 6, 1558, in Rome) was an Italian astrologer, astronomer, astrological data collector, and mathematician. He was born to a poor family in the Kingdom of Naples, and studied judicial astrology, a subject he defended in his Oratio de Inventoribus et Astrologiae Laudibus (1508). Judicial astrology concerned the fate of man (astrologia judiciaria; mundane astrology) as influenced by the stars. His most famous work is the Tractatus Astrologicus. Later in life he was named a bishop of the Catholic Church.

== Career as astrologer ==
Gaurico's reputation was such that he served as an "astrological consultant" to Catherine de' Medici. Gaurico had predicted the accession to the papacy of Catherine's great-uncle Giovanni de Medici (when he was 14 – who later became Leo X) and predicted Catherine's uncle Giulio de Medici involvement in important political struggles and numerous descendants. Giulio de Medici later was to become Pope Clement VII, who involved with disputes with both Charles V, Holy Roman Emperor and Henry VIII of England.

Giovanni II Bentivoglio, ruler of Bologna, consulted him about his destiny. Displeased with Gaurico's prophecy, Bentivoglio subjected Gaurico to the torture of mancuerda, the effects of which he suffered for the rest of his life, and exiled the astrologer. When Bologna fell to Pope Julius II, Gaurico returned to general favor.

Gaurico became famous after predicting the ascension of Alessandro Farnese, a prediction that came true with Farnese's ascension as Paul III. Gaurico foretold also the sickness and death of this Pontiff, who died on November 20, 1549, the day said to have been indicated by Gaurico. Paul III obviously did not wait for his death in order to verify Gaurico's prediction. Paul III, who encouraged astrologers to come to Rome and work under his protection, made Gaurico his unofficial astrologer, and he was made a Papal Table Companion, knighted, and appointed bishop of Giffoni (Salerno province), and thus described as Episcopus Geophonensis, in 1539. Paul III made Gaurico bishop of Civitate (San Severo), in Capitanata, in southern Italy, in 1545. Four years after the death of Paul III, Gaurico abandoned these duties and settled in Rome.

The Tractatus Astrologicus contained the natal charts of popes and cardinals, kings and nobles, scholars, musicians and artists. Gaurico systematically examined each natal chart, compared it to the life of the person in question, and in the case of living subjects, predicted the outcome of their lives and careers. Gaurico also attempted to calculate the exact date of Jesus' crucifixion, and the number of hours between it and the resurrection. Allegedly, both he and Nostradamus were responsible for predicting the death of Henry II of France in a tournament in 1559.

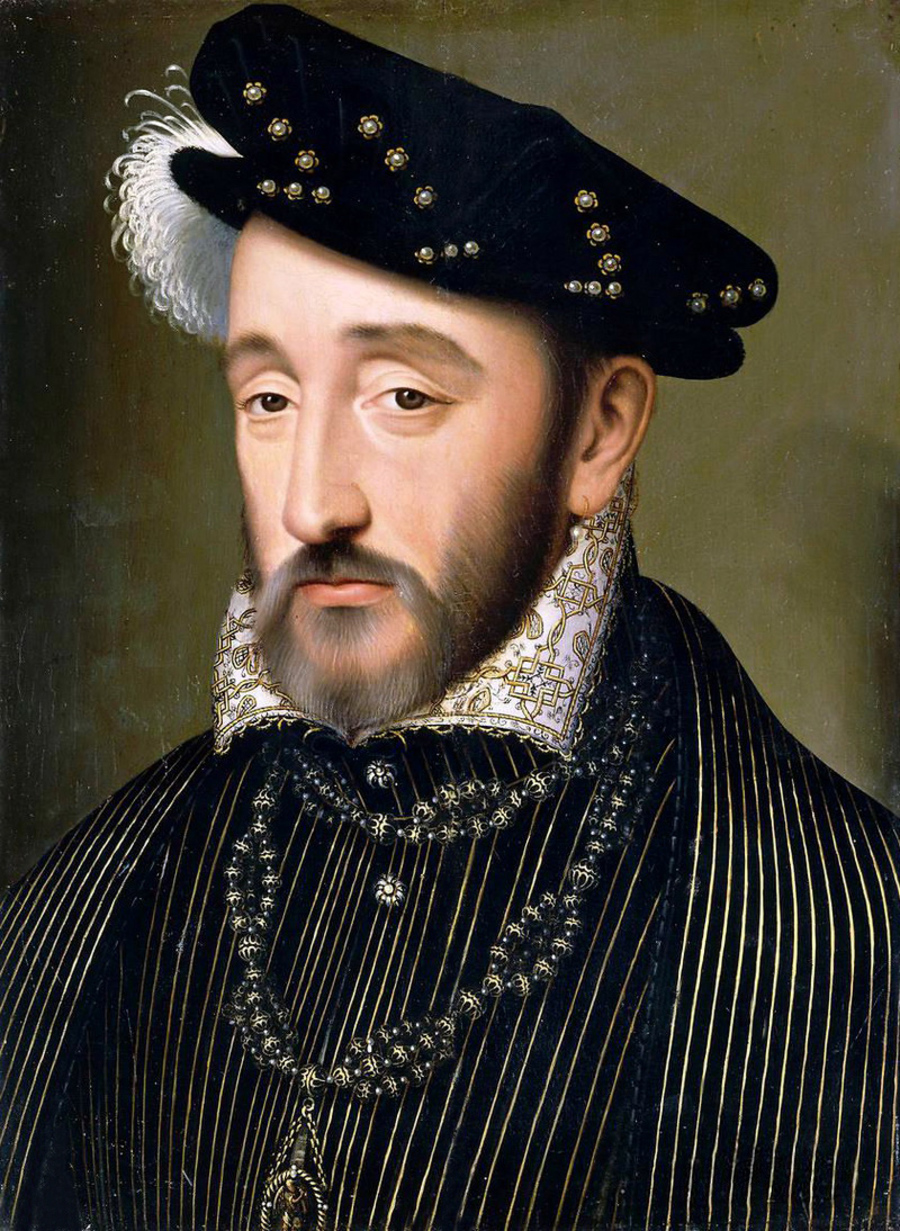
Henry II of France, whose death both Nostradamus and Gauricus are said to have predicted.

Allegedly, Catherine de' Medici had wished to know Henry's destiny as the Apparent Heir of France. Allegedly, Gaurico replied that the Heir would exert his royal power, which would first marked by a duel, and finally by another duel that would put a stop to his reign and his life. Allegedly, he also explained in detail the kind of wound that would result in the death of Henry II during this duel.

Allegedly, the danger of this duel was considered impossible because of the social condition of the Prince, and Gaurico was not believed. Allegedly, Gaurico insisted on his statements, printed in France in 1552, that is, seven years before the well-known joust in which Henry II would find his death. He is also said to have sent a letter to the King repeating with full details his prediction and advising him to avoid any single combat in closed field, especially around the time when he had reached 41 years of age, since a wound on his head, at this age, could produce his blindness or his death. Allegedly, the letter did not deter Henry.

On July 1, 1559, during a match to celebrate the Peace Treaty of Cateau-Cambrésis with his longtime enemies, the Habsburgs of Austria and to celebrate the marriage of his daughter Elizabeth of Valois to King Philip II of Spain, during the final joust, King Henry's eye was pierced by a sliver that penetrated the brain, from the shattered lance of Gabriel Montgomery, captain of the King's Scottish Guard. He suffered terribly, and, despite the efforts of royal surgeon Ambroise Paré, died on July 10, 1559, and was buried in a cadaver tomb in Saint Denis Basilica.

In fact, the one known horoscope of Henri II by Gaurico is literally quoted in the Dictionnaire of Pierre Bayle. There is no question of a duel. Gaurico promises the best successes to Henri II and adds that he shall live up to the age of 69 year, 10 month and 12 days, provided that he passes the years 56, 63 and 64 of his age.

In regard to the birth of Martin Luther, Gaurico found a connection between this date (November 10, 1483, according to the reckoning of the Gregorian Calendar) and a "grand conjunction," that is, a meeting of the planets Jupiter and Saturn. Grand conjunctions were meant to predict extensive changes in the secular and religious power structures. Because the “grand conjunction” of 1484 took place in the sign of Scorpio, an astrological sign that stood for radical, revolutionary events as well as for epidemics and widespread death, this indicated to Gaurico that dramatic changes would occur in all social spheres –such as would result from the Reformation.

Gaurico has been identified by the historian Paola Zambelli as the author of an anonymous 1512 pamphlet that predicted a universal deluge to take place in 1524 as a result of a conjunction of the superior planets in the watery sign of Pisces.

== Astrology and buildings ==
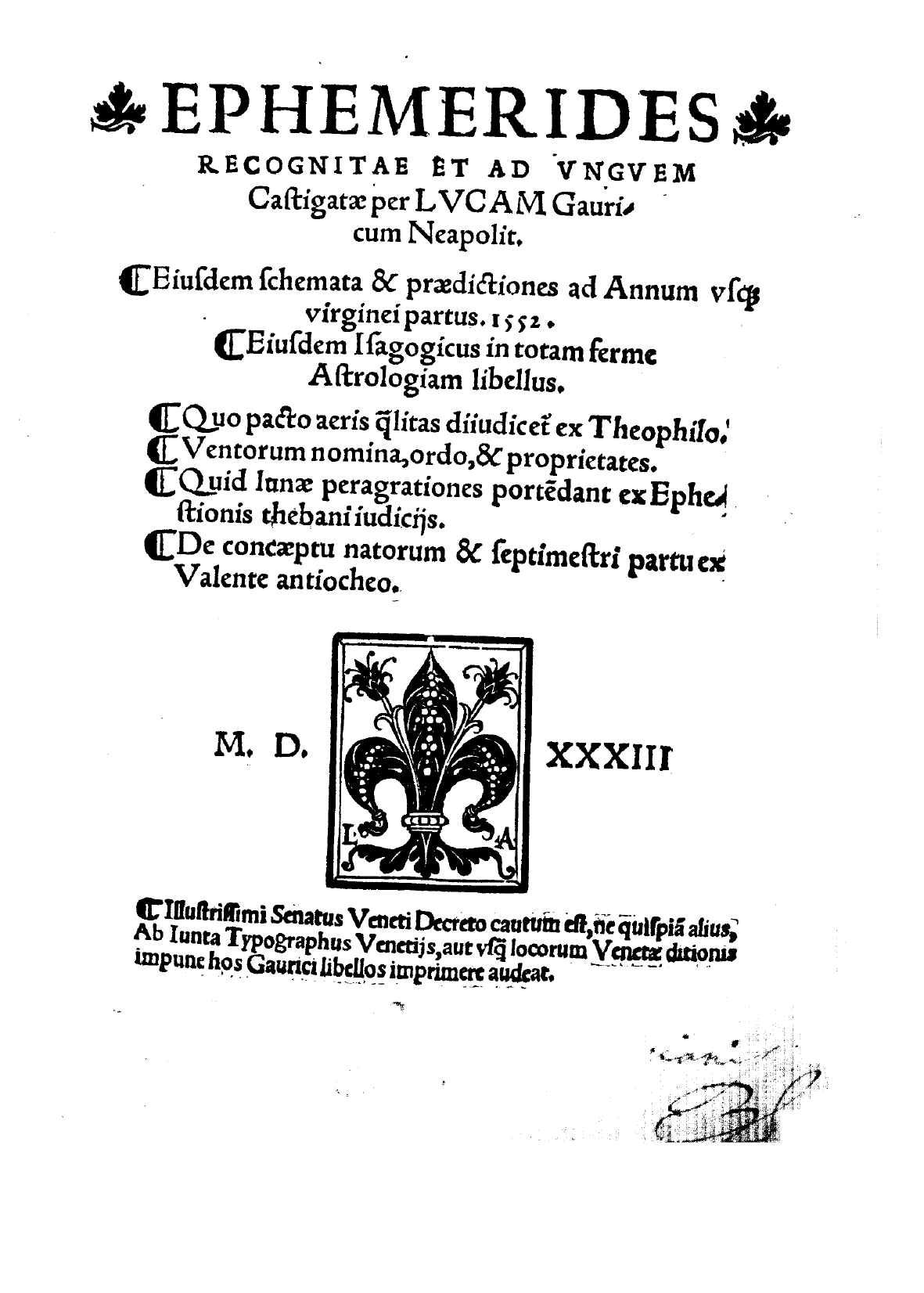
Ephemerides recognitae et ad unguem castigatae, 1533

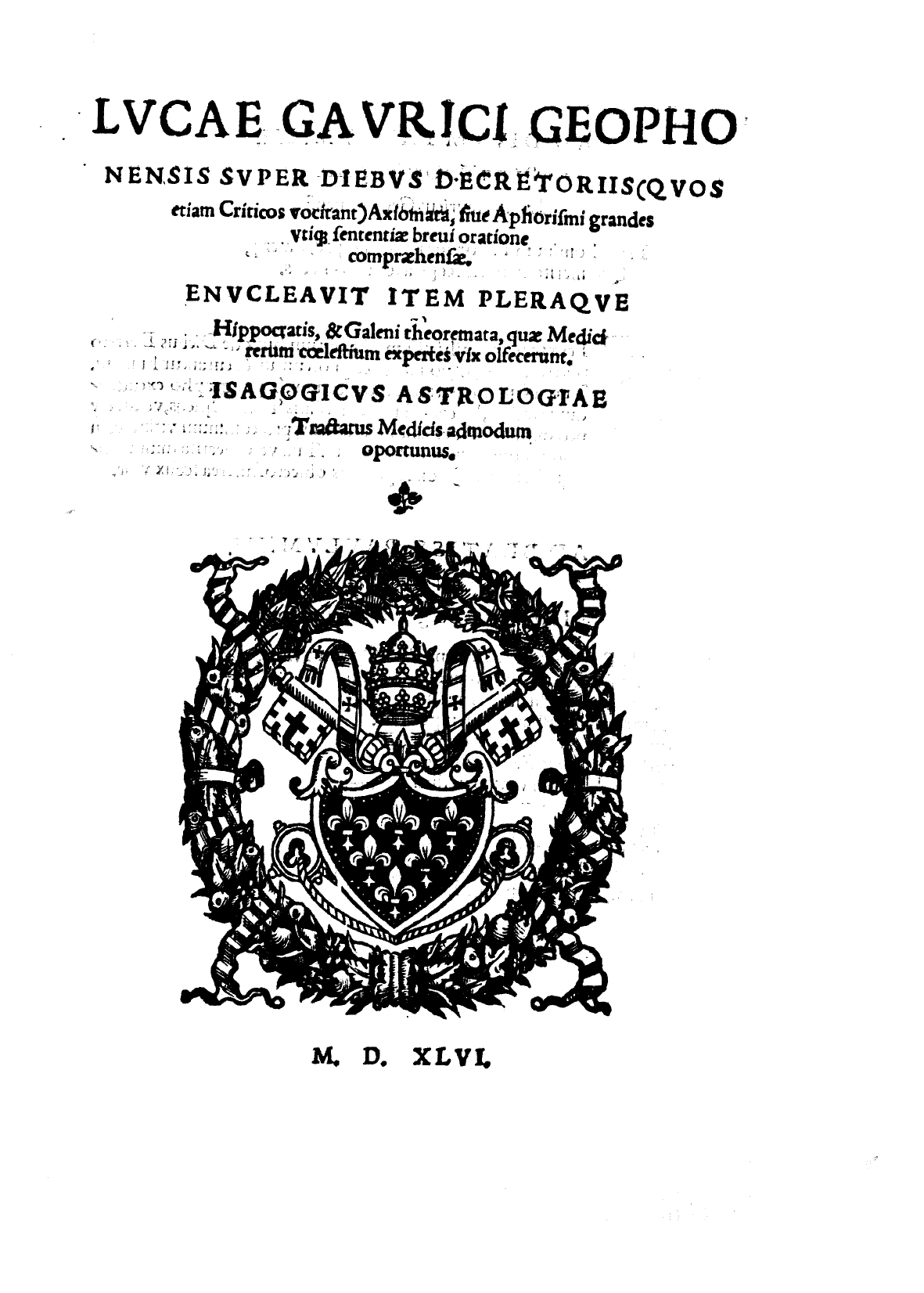
Super diebus decretoriis quos etiam criticos vocitant axiomata, 1546

Gaurico was widely renowned as an astrologer, and his Tractatus Astrologicus (1552) also contained charts of the foundation of various buildings and cities. Pope Paul III thus used Gaurico to determine the most auspicious time at which the cornerstone of a new building in the neighborhood of St Peter's Basilica should be laid. It is said that Gaurico arrived at the scene in great pomp. An assistant, the astrologer Vincentius Campanatius of Bologna, was commanded to inspect the sky with an astrolabe and cry out in a loud voice the best time when the moment to lay the first marble slab arrived.

== Legacy ==
Gaurico ran a school of astrology at Ferrara. One of his pupils was Julius Caesar Scaliger. As a scholar, Gaurico edited George of Trebizon's translation of Ptolemy's Almagest, a work Gaurico dedicated to Pope Nicholas V, who had commissioned the work. Gaurico theorized that Ptolemy was a native of Pelusium.

The lunar crater Gauricus is named after him.

His major works include:

- Tractatus Astrologicus (1552), in full Tractatus astrologicus de genituris, in quo agitur de praeteritis, praesentibus et futuris fatis hominum, ex eorum genituris investigandis. (Astrological Treatise on Nativities, in which the past, present, and future fates of men are investigated from their birth charts). At the time of this edit 10/06/2025 no full translation of this work is extant.
- Tractatus astrologiae (1540), in full "Tractatus astrologiae iudiciariae de nativitatibus virorum et mulierum" (Astrological Treatise on the judgment of the nativities of men and women). Gaurico's contribution is a collection of aphorisms, which are brief, general principles comparable to the yogas of Hindu astrology. A translation of Gaurico's contribution is Gaurico (2025).
