= Opelt (crater) =

Crater on the Moon

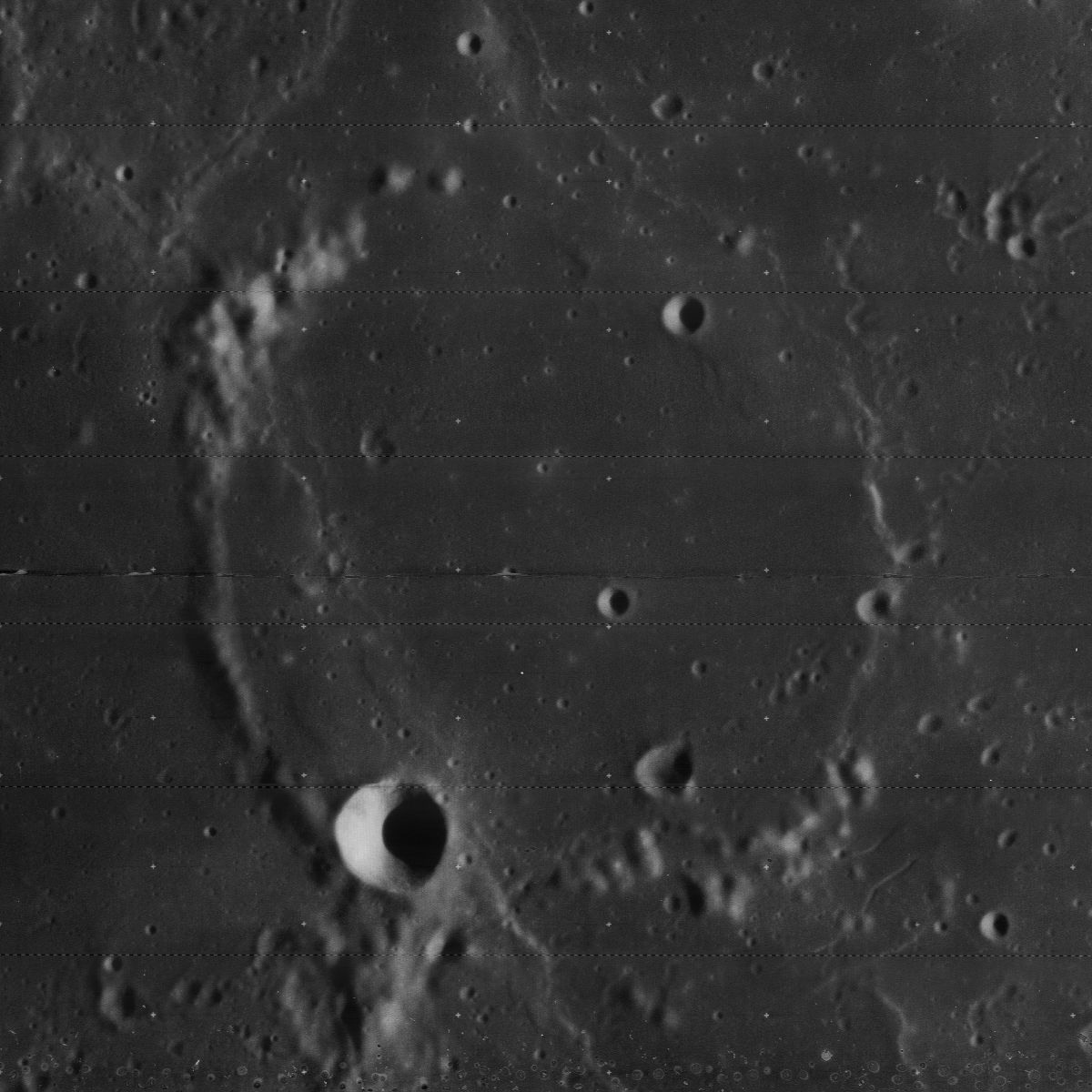
- Lunar Orbiter 4 image
- Coordinates: 16.3°S 17.5°W
- Diameter: 48 km
- Colongitude: 17° at sunrise
- Eponym: Friedrich W. Opelt and Otto Moritz Opelt

Opelt is the lava-flooded remnant of a lunar impact crater on the Mare Nubium. It lies to the north of a similar formation named Gould and to the northeast of the prominent Bullialdus.

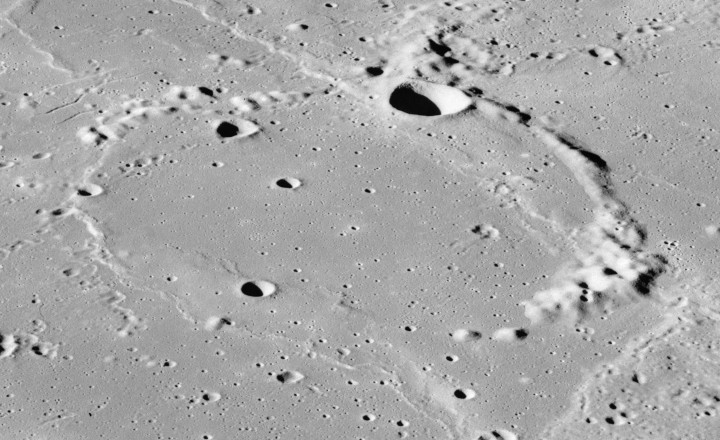
Oblique view of Opelt from Apollo 16, facing south

The crater was named after the German astronomers Friedrich Wilhelm Opelt and his son Otto Moritz Opelt.

Only a slightly raised outline remains of Opelt's rim, the interior having been inundated with lava. The rim has a wide break at the northern end and several smaller breaks to the south and southeast. The satellite crater Opelt E lies at the southern end of the surviving western rim. The interior floor is nearly level, with the exception of a slight rise to the southwest, which is continuous with a wrinkle ridge to the south.

To the north of Opelt on the lunar mare is a sinuous system of rilles designated Rimae Opelt. These occupy a diameter of about 70 kilometers.

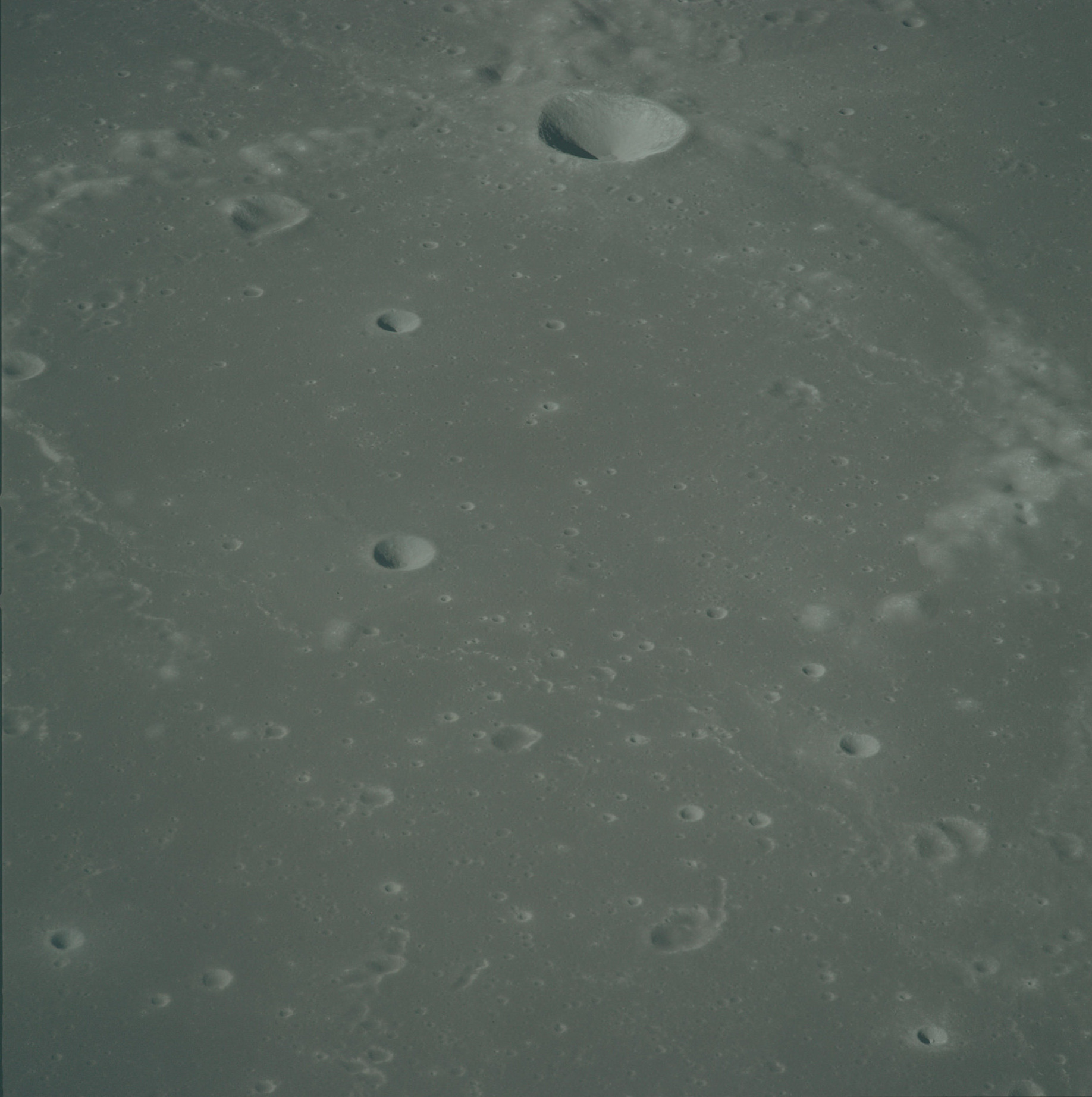
Oblique view also from Apollo 16

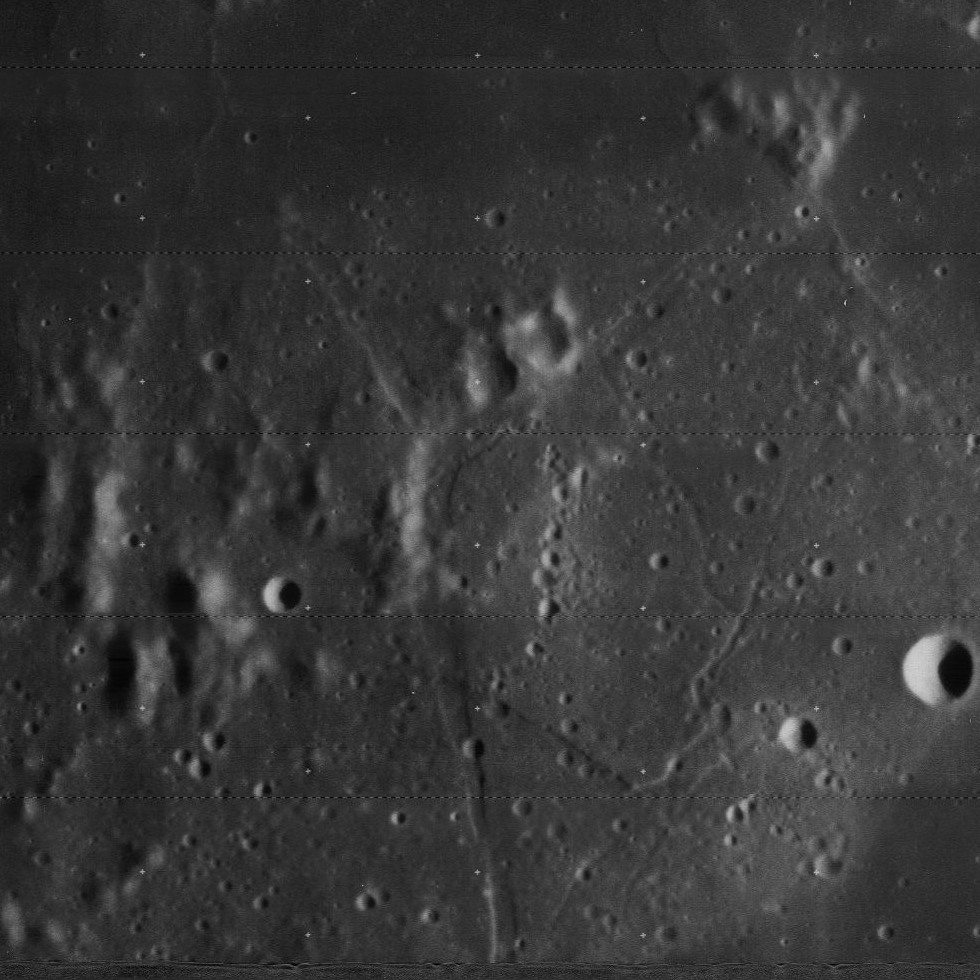
Rimae Opelt (linear features near center), due north of Opelt

== Satellite craters ==
By convention these features are identified on lunar maps by placing the letter on the side of the crater midpoint that is closest to Opelt.

Opelt	Latitude	Longitude	Diameter
E	17.0° S	17.8° W	8 km
F	18.1° S	18.7° W	4 km
G	16.8° S	17.2° W	4 km
H	15.8° S	17.3° W	3 km
K	13.6° S	17.1° W	5 km
