= Johann Philipp von Wurzelbauer =

German astronomer

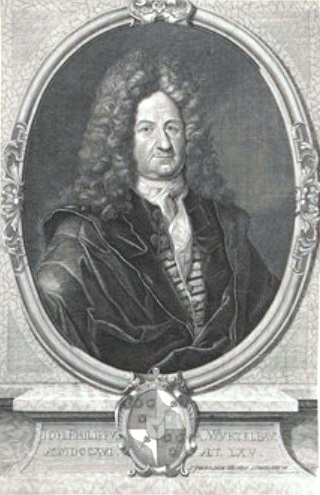
Johann Philipp von Wurzelbauer

Johann Philipp von Wurzelbauer (also spelled Wurzelbaur, Wurzelbau, Wurtzelbaur, Wurtzelbau) (28 September 1651 – 21 July 1725) was a German astronomer.

== Biography ==
A native of Nuremberg, Wurzelbauer was a merchant who became an astronomer. As a youth, he was keenly interested in mathematics and astronomy but had been forced to earn his living as a merchant. He married twice: his first marriage was to Maria Magdalena Petz (1656–1713), his second to Sabina Dorothea Kress (1658–1733). Petz bore him six children.

He first published a work concerning his observations on the great comet of 1680, and initially began his work at a private castle-observatory on Spitzenberg 4 owned by Georg Christoph Eimmart (completely destroyed during World War II), the director of Nuremberg's painters' academy. Wurzelbauer was 64 when he began this second career, but proved himself to be an able assistant to Eimmart. A large quadrant from his days at Eimmart's observatory still survives.

After 1682, Wurzelbauer owned his own astronomical observatory and instruments, and observed the transit of Mercury, solar eclipses, and worked out the geographical latitude of his native city. After 1683, he had withdrawn himself completely from business life to dedicate himself to astronomy.

By 1700, Wurzelbauer had become the most well-known astronomer in Nuremberg. For his services to the field of astronomy, he was ennobled in 1692 by Leopold I, Holy Roman Emperor and added the von to his name. He was a member of the French and the Prussian academies of the sciences.

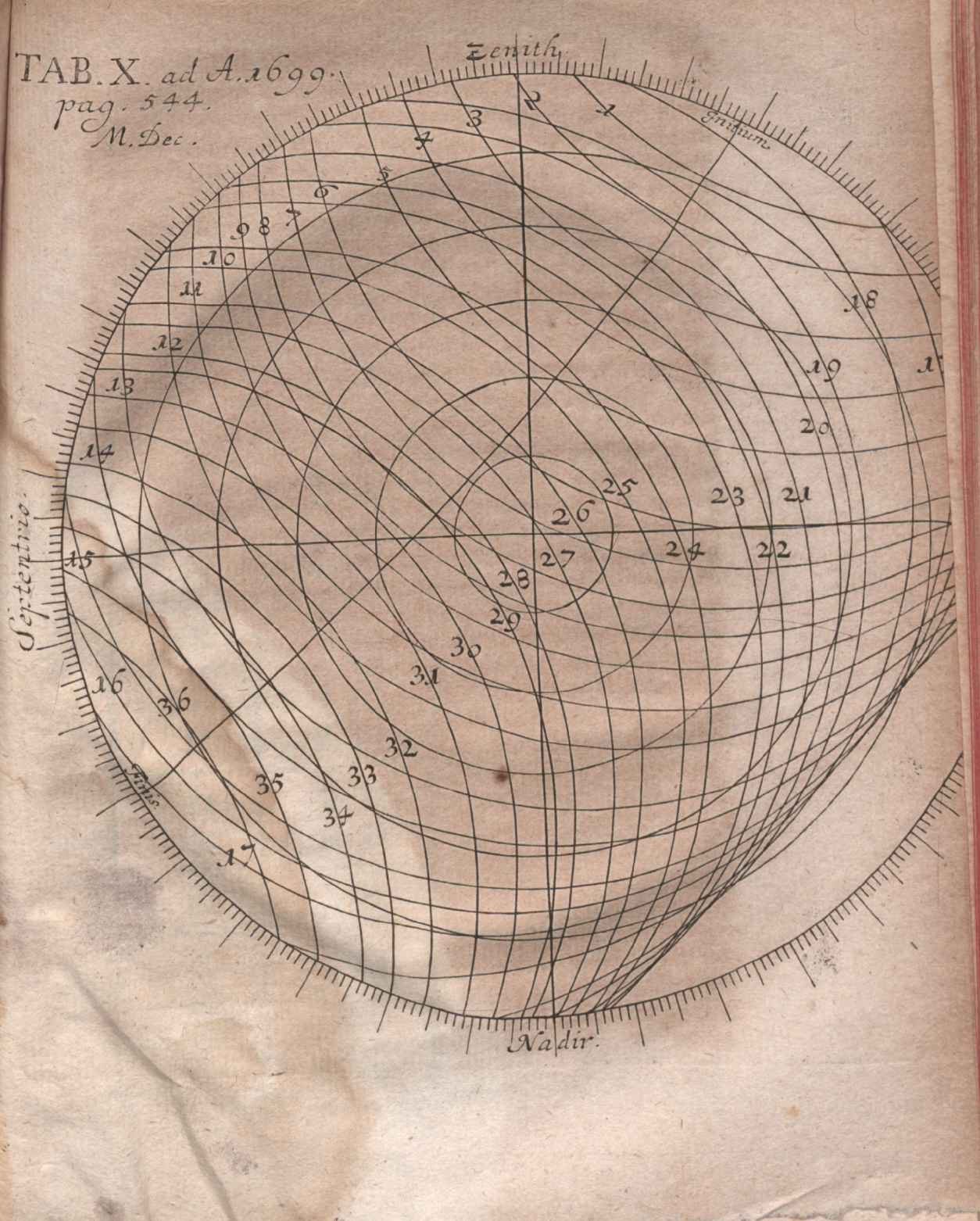
Image from Eclipsis solisi, anno 1699 ... observata Norimberga, a Johanne Philippo Wurzelbaur, published in Acta Eruditorum, 1699

The crater Wurzelbauer on the Moon is named after him.

== Works ==
- Uranies Noricae basis astronomico-geographica. Nürnberg: Selbstverlag 1697
- Herrn Christian Huygens Cosmotheoros oder weltbetrachtende Muthmassungen von den himmlischen Erdkugeln und deren Schmuck. Übers. von Johann Philipp Wurzelbaur. Leipzig 1703
- Stabilimentum baseos Uranies Noricae astronomico-geographicae Norimbergae Anno 1713
- Uranies Noricae basis astronomica. Nürnberg: Selbstverlag 1719
- Opera Geographica-Astronomica. Nürnberg: Peter Conrad Monath 1728
