= Gould (crater) =

Crater on the Moon

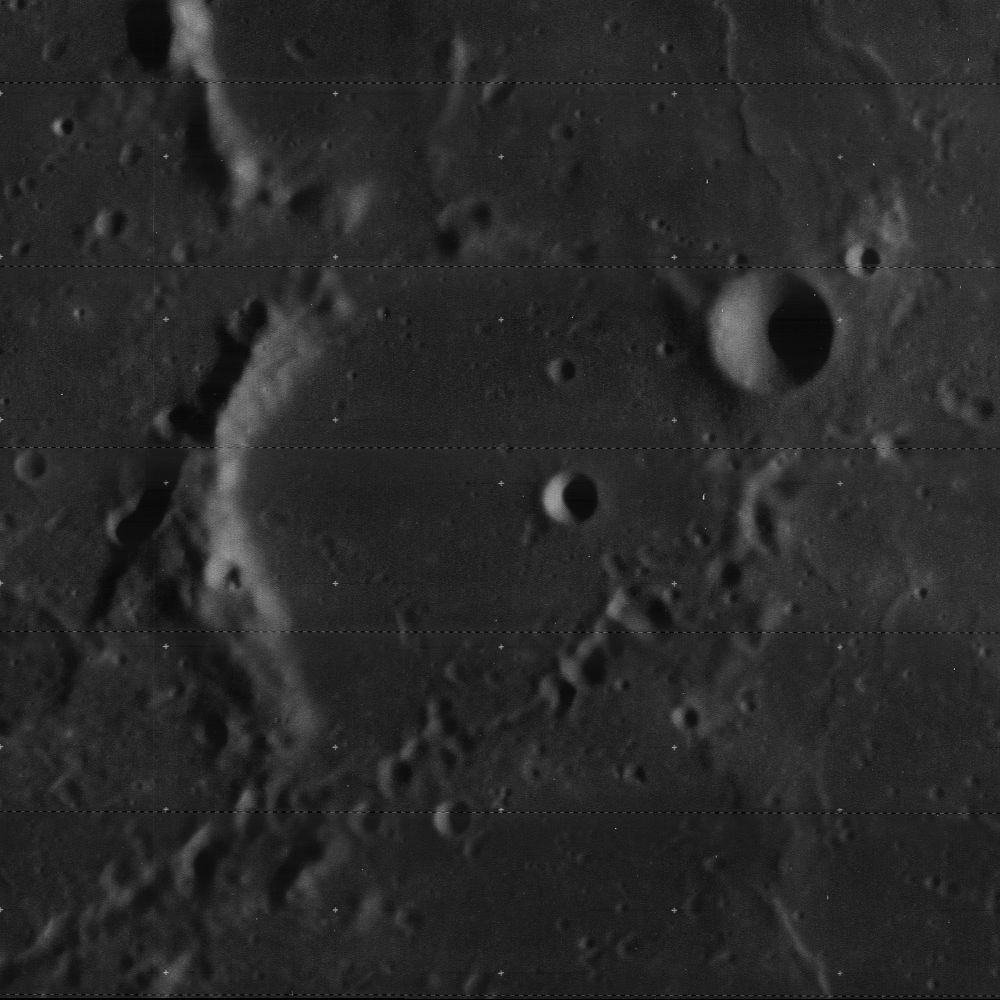
- Lunar Orbiter 4 image
- Coordinates: 19.2°S 17.2°W
- Diameter: 34 km
- Colongitude: 17° at sunrise
- Eponym: Benjamin A. Gould

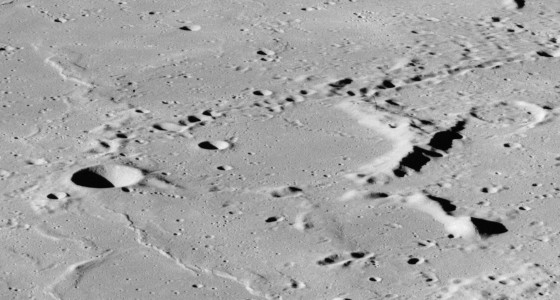
Oblique view of Gould from Apollo 16, facing south

Gould is the remnant of a lunar impact crater formation that lies in the midst of the Mare Nubium, in the southwest quadrant of the Moon. It was named after American astronomer Benjamin A. Gould. It is located to the east-northeast of the prominent crater Bullialdus, and south of the crater remnant Opelt.

This crater has been flooded by basaltic lava, and only segments of the outer rim still project above the surface of the lunar mare. The most intact section of the rim is the western quadrant, which now forms a curved ridge. There is a shorter segment of surviving rim to the northeast, which is bisected by the crater Gould P. Only small, low ridges remain to outline the original crater to the north and southeast, and the southern rim has been completely destroyed.

A catena, or chain of tiny craters, forms a line running from the southern part of the crater floor towards the eastern part. The craters are probably secondaries from Bullialdus.

== Satellite craters ==
By convention these features are identified on lunar maps by placing the letter on the side of the crater midpoint that is closest to Gould.

Gould	Latitude	Longitude	Diameter
A	19.2° S	17.0° W	3 km
B	20.5° S	18.4° W	3 km
M	17.7° S	17.2° W	41 km
N	18.4° S	17.6° W	17 km
P	18.8° S	16.6° W	8 km
U	18.2° S	14.9° W	2 km
X	20.9° S	16.9° W	3 km
Y	20.6° S	15.8° W	3 km
Z	19.5° S	15.1° W	2 km
