= Wurzelbauer (crater) =

Crater on the Moon

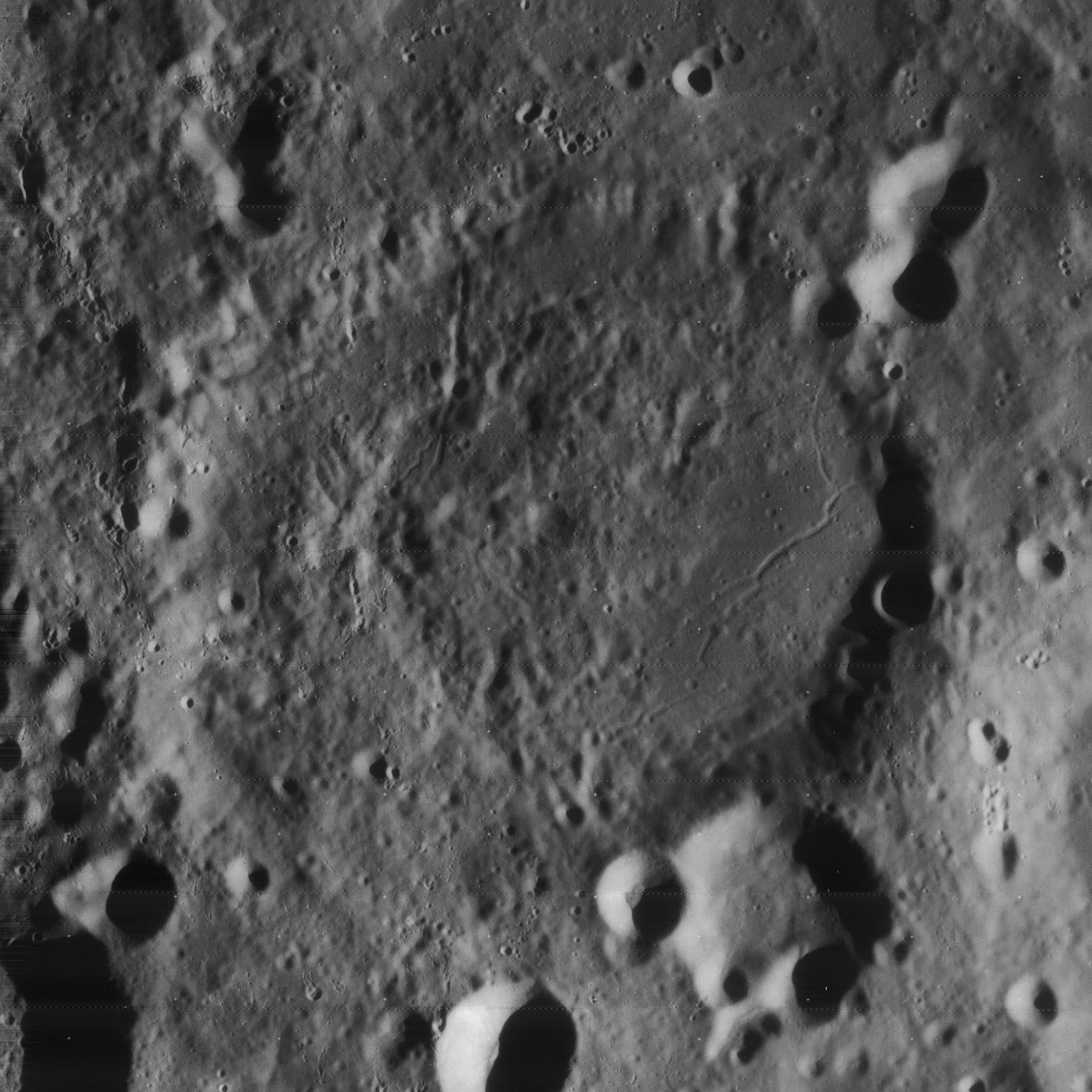
- Lunar Orbiter 4 image
- Coordinates: 33.9°S 15.9°W
- Diameter: 88 km
- Depth: 2.2 km
- Colongitude: 17° at sunrise
- Eponym: Johann Philipp von Wurzelbauer

Wurzelbauer is the remnant of a lunar impact crater. It was named after German astronomer Johann Philipp von Wurzelbauer. It is located in the rugged terrain of the Moon's southern hemisphere. The slightly smaller crater Gauricus lies next to the eastern rim, while to the north-northeast is Pitatus.

The rim of this crater has been deeply eroded, and now forms a low, somewhat irregular ridge around the interior floor. Along the southeastern rim is Wurzelbauer B, while Wurzelbauer A is nearly attached to the southern rim. A short chain of craters lies across the northern rim.

The western half of the interior floor is somewhat more irregular than the east, with a complex of low ridges covering parts of the surface. The western edge of the floor is marked by a section of the ray system radiating from Tycho to the south-southeast.

== Satellite craters ==
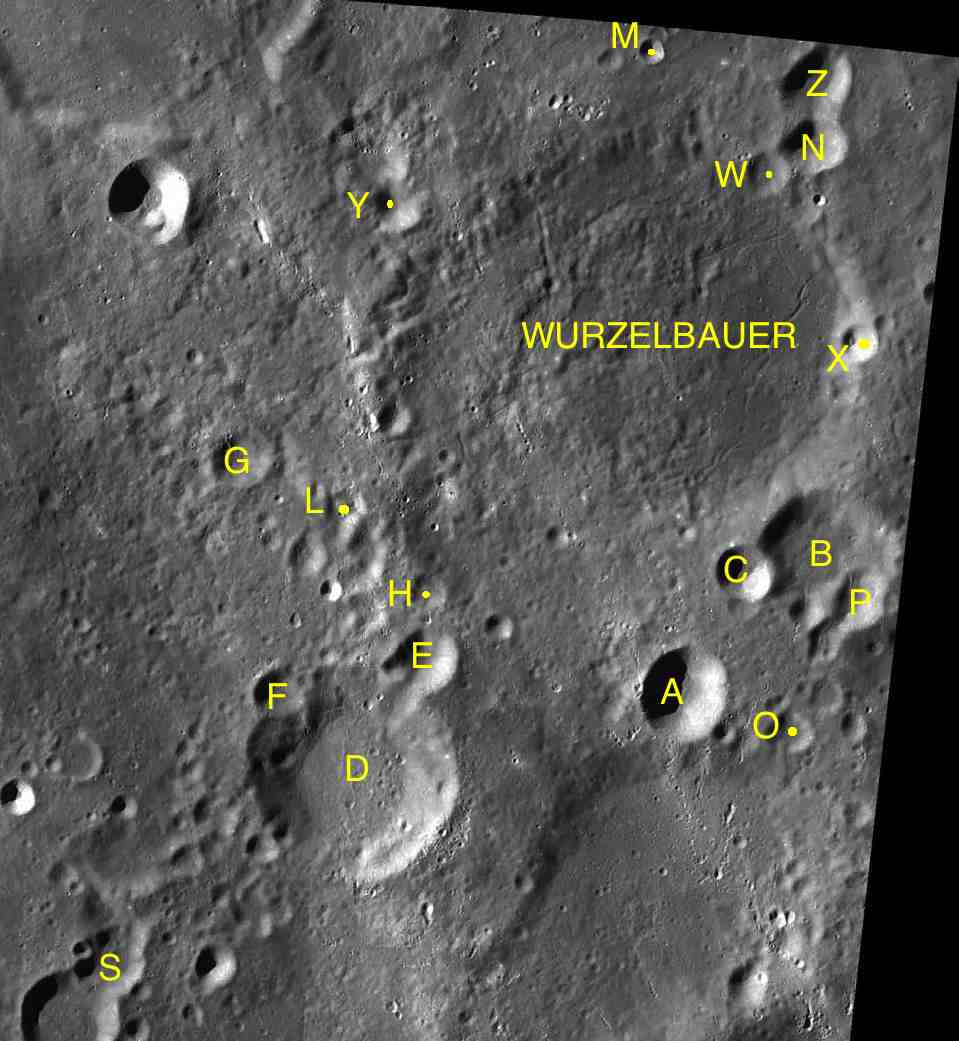
Wurzelbauer and its satellite craters (LRO image)

By convention, these features are identified on lunar maps by placing the letter on the side of the crater midpoint that is closest to Wurzelbauer.

Wurzelbauer	Latitude	Longitude	Diameter
A	35.7° S	15.4° W	17 km
B	34.9° S	14.5° W	25 km
C	35.0° S	15.1° W	10 km
D	36.3° S	17.6° W	38 km
E	35.7° S	17.2° W	11 km
F	35.9° S	18.1° W	9 km
G	34.6° S	18.6° W	11 km
H	35.3° S	17.2° W	7 km
L	34.8° S	17.8° W	7 km
M	32.1° S	16.0° W	5 km
N	32.5° S	14.8° W	13 km
O	35.9° S	14.6° W	9 km
P	35.1° S	14.2° W	9 km
S	35.7° S	19.3° W	12 km
W	32.7° S	15.1° W	8 km
X	33.6° S	14.4° W	7 km
Y	33.2° S	17.7° W	9 km
Z	32.2° S	14.9° W	12 km
