= Gauricus (crater) =

Crater on the Moon

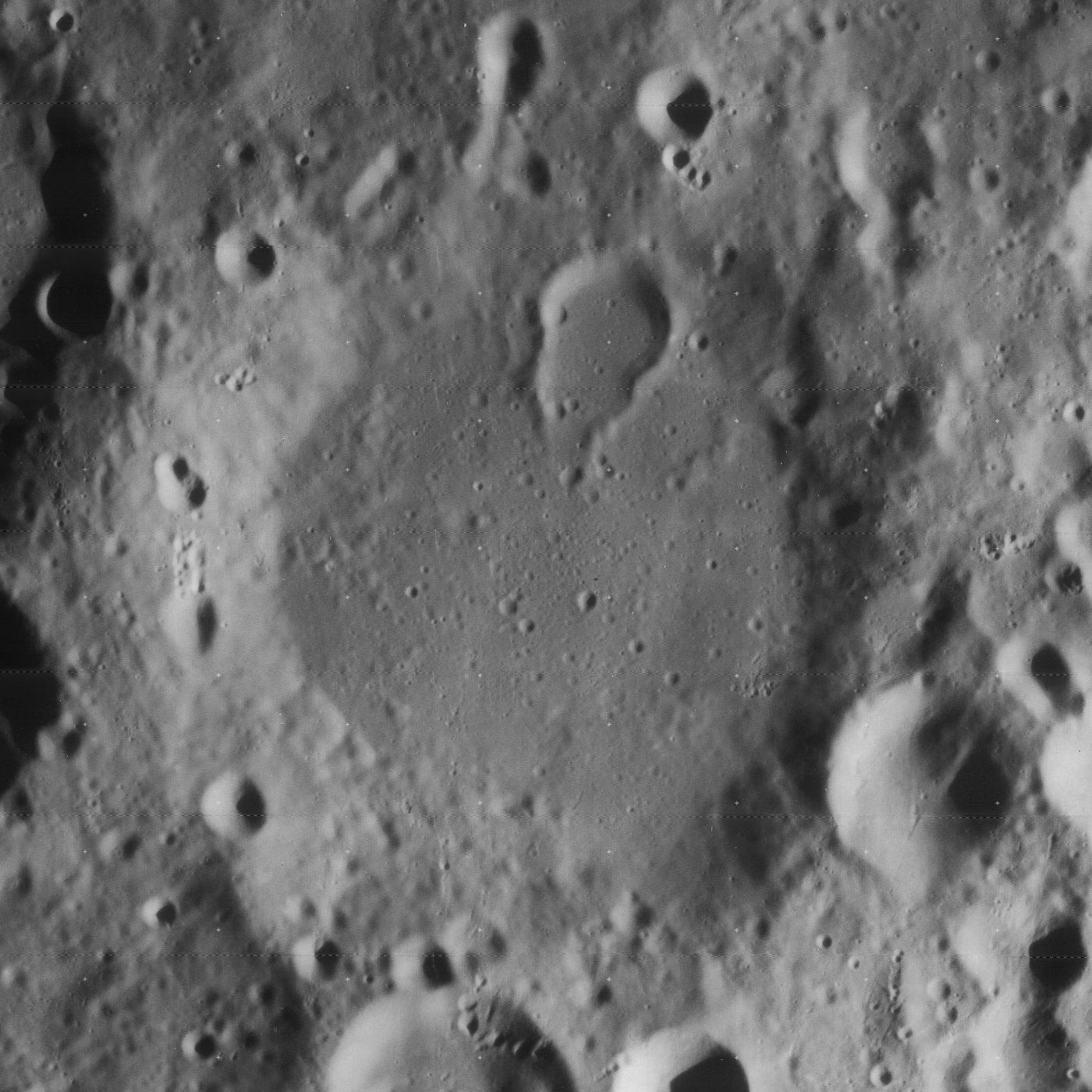
- Lunar Orbiter 4 image
- Coordinates: 33.8°S 12.6°W
- Diameter: 79 km
- Depth: 2.7 km
- Colongitude: 14° at sunrise
- Eponym: Luca Gaurico

Gauricus is a lunar impact crater that is located in the rugged southern part of the Moon's near side. It was named after Italian astronomer Luca Gaurico. Nearly attached to the western rim is the heavily eroded crater Wurzelbauer, and to the north-northwest lies Pitatus.

The rim of this crater has become worn and eroded by subsequent impacts, resulting in a round-shouldered outer wall that is pock-marked by a number of lesser craters. The most notable of these are Gauricus B and Gauricus D along the southern rim and Gauricus G intrudes into the eastern rim. The worn satellite crater Gauricus A is attached to the exterior rim along the south-southwest.

In contrast, the interior floor is relatively level and featureless. Only the merged crater formation Gauricus F, lying along the northern rim, marks the floor. The bottom is covered by wisps of ray material from Tycho to the south.

== Satellite craters ==
By convention these features are identified on lunar maps by placing the letter on the side of the crater midpoint that is closest to Gauricus.

| Gauricus | Latitude | Longitude | Diameter |
|---|---|---|---|
| A | 35.6° S | 13.4° W | 38 km |
| B | 35.3° S | 12.2° W | 23 km |
| C | 35.2° S | 10.7° W | 11 km |
| D | 35.1° S | 11.4° W | 13 km |
| E | 32.5° S | 11.8° W | 7 km |
| F | 33.0° S | 12.6° W | 12 km |
| G | 33.9° S | 11.0° W | 18 km |
| H | 38.1° S | 13.3° W | 8 km |
| J | 32.3° S | 11.9° W | 10 km |
| K | 33.3° S | 13.9° W | 5 km |
| L | 34.0° S | 13.8° W | 4 km |
| M | 34.4° S | 13.6° W | 6 km |
| N | 32.4° S | 12.7° W | 7 km |
| P | 35.1° S | 12.4° W | 6 km |
| R | 34.8° S | 13.3° W | 6 km |
| S | 33.9° S | 10.1° W | 15 km |
