= 1217 Maximiliana =

Main-belt asteroid

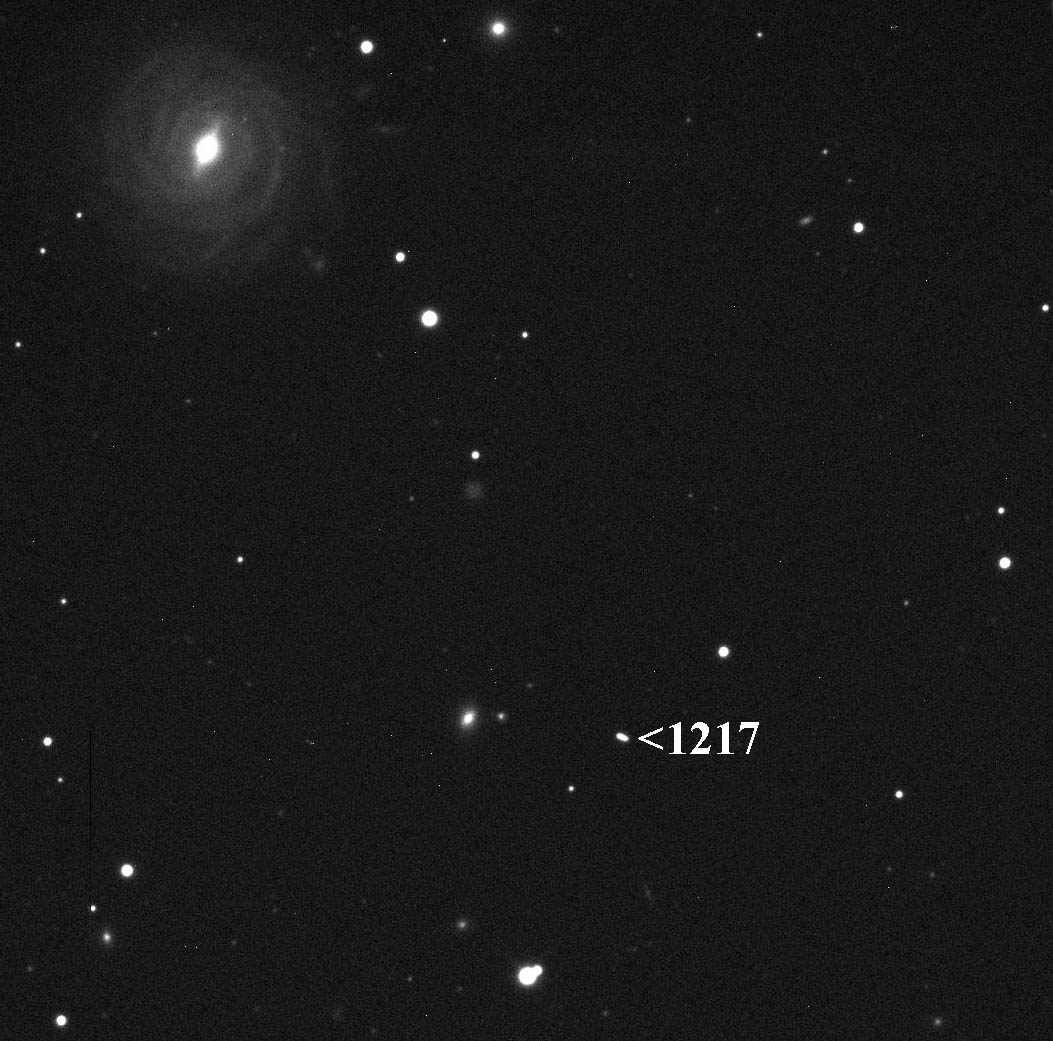
- Maximiliana (marked "1217") near spiral galaxy NGC 521; imaged by K. and P. J. Heider.

Discovery
- Discovered by: E. Delporte
- Discovery site: Uccle Obs.
- Discovery date: 13 March 1932

Designations
- Named after: Max Wolf (German astronomer)
- Alternative designations: 1932 EC · 1925 HC; 1962 TD
- Minor planet category: main-belt · (inner); Erigone · background

Orbital characteristics
- Epoch 4 September 2017 (JD 2458000.5)
- Uncertainty parameter 0
- Observation arc: 92.59 yr (33,818 days)
- Aphelion: 2.7157 AU
- Perihelion: 1.9901 AU
- Semi-major axis: 2.3529 AU
- Eccentricity: 0.1542
- Orbital period (sidereal): 3.61 yr (1,318 days)
- Mean anomaly: 196.36°
- Mean motion: 0° 16^{m} 23.16^{s} / day
- Inclination: 5.1534°
- Longitude of ascending node: 148.43°
- Argument of perihelion: 91.464°

Physical characteristics
- Mean diameter: 16.81 km (calculated)
- Synodic rotation period: 3.1987±0.0001 h (Note: Pravec (2015) web: lightcurve plot of (1217) Maximiliana with a rotation period of 3.1987±0.0001 hours and a brightness amplitude of 0.21±0.02 mag. Quality Code of 3-. Summary figures at the LCDB and Pravec, P.; Wolf, M.; Sarounova, L. (2015) (2015) (data sheet))
- Geometric albedo: 0.057 (assumed)
- Spectral type: C (assumed)
- Absolute magnitude (H): 12.6; 12.7

1217 Maximiliana, provisional designation 1932 EC, is a background asteroid from the inner regions of the asteroid belt, approximately 17 kilometers (11 mi) in diameter. It was discovered on 13 March 1932, by Belgian astronomer Eugène Delporte at the Royal Observatory of Belgium in Uccle. The asteroid was named in memory of Max Wolf, a German astronomer and discoverer of asteroids himself, who independently discovered this asteroid.

== Orbit and classification ==
Maximiliana is a non-family asteroid of the main belt's background population when applying the hierarchical clustering method to its proper orbital elements. Based on osculating Keplerian orbital elements, the asteroid has also been classified as a member of the Erigone family (406), a large asteroid family named after 163 Erigone.

It orbits the Sun in the inner asteroid belt at a distance of 2.0–2.7 AU once every 3 years and 7 months (1,318 days; semi-major axis of 2.35 AU). Its orbit has an eccentricity of 0.15 and an inclination of 5° with respect to the ecliptic. The asteroid was first observed as 1925 HC at Heidelberg in April 1925. The body's observation arc begins in May 1925, also at Heidelberg, and almost 8 years prior to its official discovery observation at Uccle.

== Naming ==
This minor planet was named in memory of Max Wolf (1863–1932), who independently discovered this asteroids the night before its official discovery by Delporte. Wolf was a German astronomer, founder and director of the influential Heidelberg Observatory, and a prolific discoverer of minor planets and other astronomical objects himself. The asteroid was named by the discoverer based on a suggestion by Wolf's widow. The official naming citation was mentioned in The Names of the Minor Planets by Paul Herget in 1955 (H 112). Asteroid 827 Wolfiana and the lunar crater Wolf were also named in his honor.

== Physical characteristics ==
Maximiliana is an assumed carbonaceous C-type asteroid. For comparison, members of the Erigone family are typically found to be C- and X-type asteroids.

=== Rotation period ===
In March 2015, a rotational lightcurve of Maximiliana was obtained from photometric observations by Petr Pravec at Ondřejov Observatory. Lightcurve analysis gave a rotation period of 3.1987 hours with a brightness amplitude of 0.21 magnitude (U=3-).

=== Diameter and albedo ===
Maximiliana has not been observed by any of the space-based telescopes such as the Wide-field Infrared Survey Explorer, the Akari satellite or the Infrared Astronomical Satellite IRAS. The Collaborative Asteroid Lightcurve Link assumes a standard albedo for carbonaceous asteroids of 0.057 and calculates a diameter of 16.81 kilometers based on an absolute magnitude of 12.6.
