= William Radcliffe Birt =

English astronomer

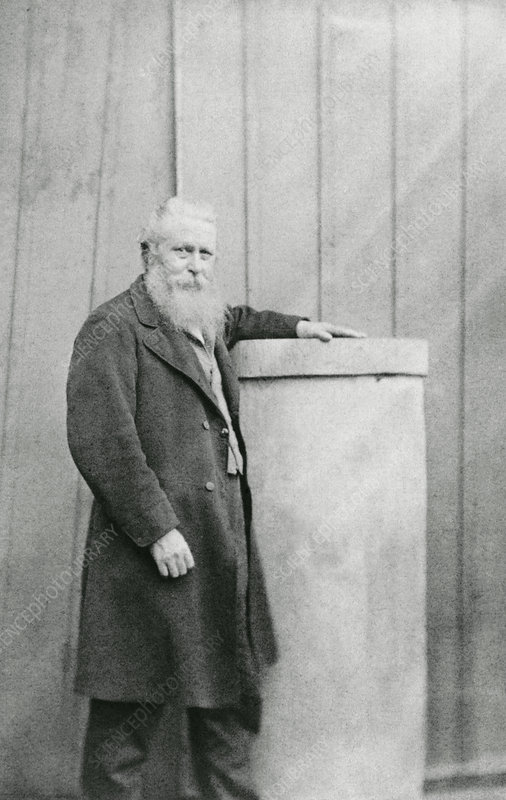
William Radcliffe Birt FRAS (1804–1881) was an English amateur astronomer in the 19th century. This photograph, showing Birt with the pier of Victoria Park Observatory in London, was taken in October 1867.

William Radcliffe Birt FRAS (15 July 1804 – 14 December 1881) was an English amateur astronomer in the 19th century. Birt was employed by John Herschel to carry out a great deal of meteorogical research on atmospheric waves, from 1839 to 1843. A lot of his work is held in the Scientist's Collection at the American Philosophical Society.

Probably on Herschel's recommendation, Birt became involved with the Kew Observatory in the later 1840s under the Directorship of Francis Ronalds. He analysed and published the latter's detailed atmospheric electricity and meteorological observations. They also worked together on a new design of kite for making meteorological recordings in the upper air. Birt was formally appointed in late 1849 as Ronalds' assistant but their relationship soured shortly afterwards and Birt was requested by the Kew Committee to leave in mid-1850. In 1850 he published 'The Hurricane Guide: Being an attempt to Connect the Rotary Gale or Revolving Storm with Atmospheric Waves'. Later, in 1853, he subsequently published a second book a 'Handbook on the Law of Storms: being a digest of the Principal Facts of Revolving Storms' a second edition of which appeared in 1879.

Although Birt published some papers on general astronomy, he is best remembered for his work in selenography, particularly work published in the Astronomical Register. He was the president of the short lived Selenographical Society. Birt was able to use the Hartwell Observatory for some of his work. For the last decade of his life he published a monthly guide to lunar observation. He also published, jointly with the Rev. W. J. B. Richards an introductory series of articles on how to observe the Moon.

The lunar crater Birt is named after him.
