= Mancuerda =

Method of torture

Mancuerda was a method of torture used during the Inquisition. A tight cord was wound around the arms of the condemned. The executioner would then throw his entire weight backwards, or the pressure would be exerted by a lever.

The cord cut through skin and muscle directly to the bone. Additional pain was produced by the fact that the body of the prisoner was stretched as in a rack, and the belt or girdle attached to the waist also contributed further to the suffering.

The procedure was repeated six or eight times, on different parts of the arms. People subjected to such torture usually fainted from its effects.

Giovanni II Bentivoglio, tyrant of Bologna, is said to have subjected the astrologer Luca Gaurico to this method of torture after he was unhappy with a prediction that Gaurico had made.
