= Promontorium Taenarium =

Headland on the Moon

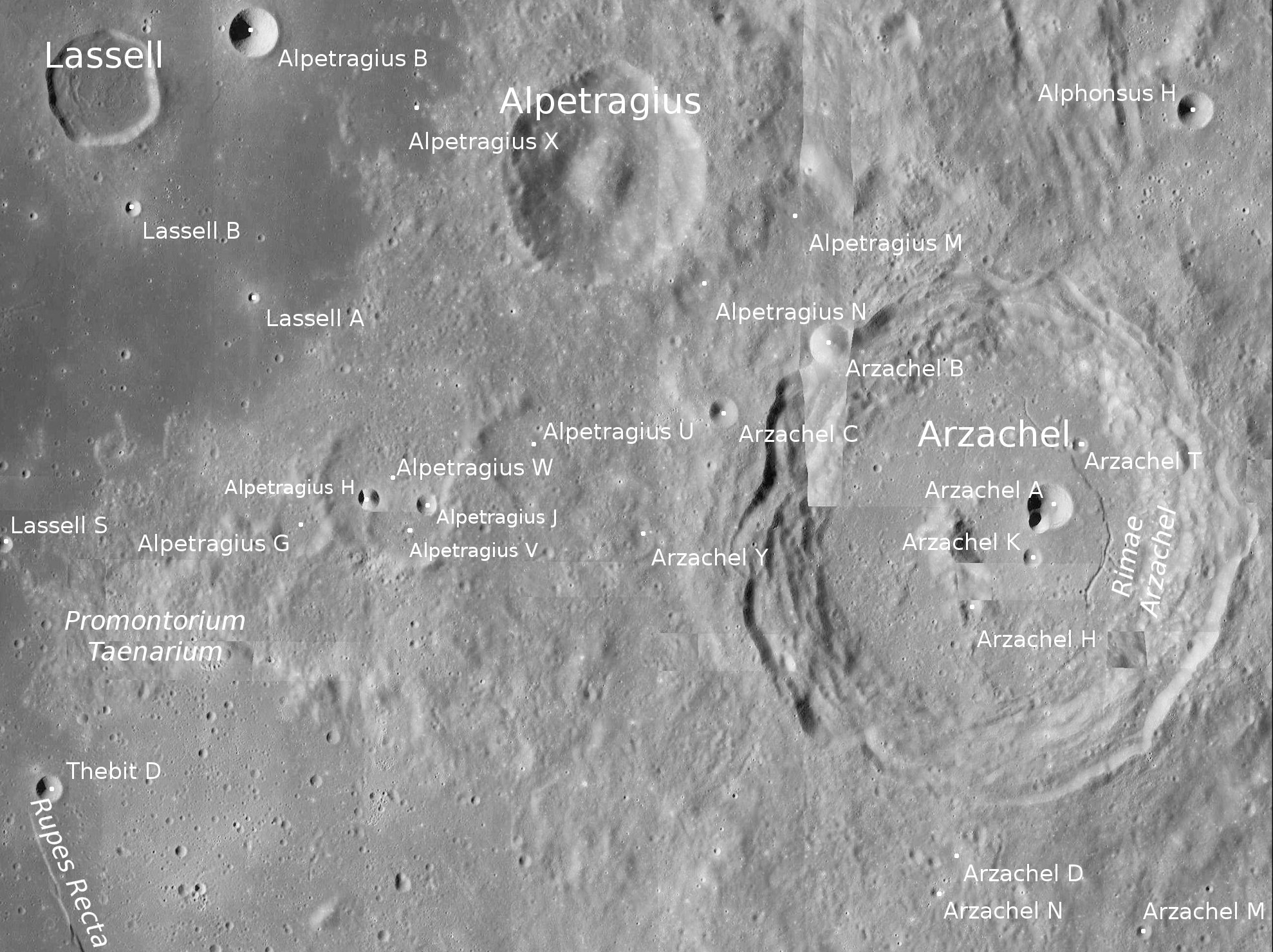
Promonontorium Taenarium is on the mid-lower left of the LRO image

Promontorium Taenarium is a headland on the near side of the Moon. It is located in the eastern end of Mare Nubium. Its length is about 70 km. Its coordinates are 18°39′0″S 7°28′24″W.

The name Promontorium Taenarium was first used by Johannes Hevelius in his 1647 map of the Moon, but this refers to a bright point at crater Guericke B. Taenarium refers to Cape Tainaron (known as Cape Matapan), the southernmost point of the Peloponnese peninsula of Greece.
