= 827 Wolfiana =

Florian asteroid

Discovery
- Discovered by: J. Palisa
- Discovery site: Vienna Obs.
- Discovery date: 29 August 1916

Designations
- Named after: Max Wolf (German astronomer)
- Alternative designations: 1916 ZW · 1928 DK; 1940 RA
- Minor planet category: main-belt · (inner); Flora

Orbital characteristics
- Epoch 4 September 2017 (JD 2458000.5)
- Uncertainty parameter 0
- Observation arc: 100.68 yr (36,773 d)
- Aphelion: 2.6314 AU
- Perihelion: 1.9172 AU
- Semi-major axis: 2.2743 AU
- Eccentricity: 0.1570
- Orbital period (sidereal): 3.43 yr (1,253 days)
- Mean anomaly: 145.31°
- Mean motion: 0° 17^{m} 14.64^{s} / day
- Inclination: 3.4231°
- Longitude of ascending node: 172.92°
- Argument of perihelion: 195.31°

Physical characteristics
- Dimensions: 6.51 km (calculated); 8.488±0.165 km 8.976±0.020 km
- Synodic rotation period: 4.0±0.3 h 4.0654±0.0001 h
- Geometric albedo: 0.1153±0.0299; 0.129±0.020; 0.24 (assumed)
- Spectral type: S (assumed)
- Absolute magnitude (H): 13.1 · 13.2

827 Wolfiana, provisional designation 1916 ZW, is a Florian asteroid from the inner regions of the asteroid belt, approximately 8 kilometers in diameter. It was discovered at Vienna Observatory on 29 August 1916, by Austrian astronomer Johann Palisa, who named it after German astronomer Max Wolf. The assumed stony asteroid has a rotation period of 4.0654 hours.

== Orbit and classification ==
Wolfiana is a member of the Flora family (402), a giant asteroid family and the largest family of stony asteroids in the main belt. It orbits the Sun in the inner asteroid belt at a distance of 1.9–2.6 AU once every 3 years and 5 months (1,253 days; semi-major axis of 2.27 AU). Its orbit has an eccentricity of 0.16 and an inclination of 3° with respect to the ecliptic. The body's observation arc begins with its official discovery observation at Vienna.

== Physical characteristics ==
Wolfiana is an assumed stony S-type asteroid, which agrees with the overall spectral type for Florian asteroids.

=== Rotation period ===
In September 2012, a rotational lightcurve of Wolfiana was obtained from photometric observations by American astronomers Luis Martinez, Arizona, and Frederick Pilcher at Organ Mesa Observatory (G50), New Mexico. Lightcurve analysis gave a well-defined rotation period of 4.0654 hours with a brightness amplitude of 0.20 magnitude (U=3), refining a period of 4.0 hours previously measured in November 2009 (U=2).

=== Diameter and albedo ===
According to the survey carried out by the NEOWISE mission of NASA's Wide-field Infrared Survey Explorer, Wolfiana measures 8.488 and 8.976 kilometers in diameter and its surface has an albedo of 0.129 and 0.1153, respectively.

The Collaborative Asteroid Lightcurve Link assumes a standard albedo of 0.24 – derived from 8 Flora, the parent body of the Flora family – and calculates a diameter of 6.51 kilometers based on an absolute magnitude of 13.1.

== Naming ==
This minor planet was named by the discoverer in 1920 (AN 211;441) after German astronomer, colleague and friend, Max Wolf (1863–1932), a professor of astronomy at Heidelberg University and founder and director of the Heidelberg-Königstuhl State Observatory, who discovered several novae, comets and 248 minor planets.

The official naming citation was mentioned in The Names of the Minor Planets by Paul Herget in 1955 (H 82). Asteroid 1217 Maximiliana and the lunar crater Wolf were also named in his honor.
