= Wolf (crater) =

Crater on the Moon

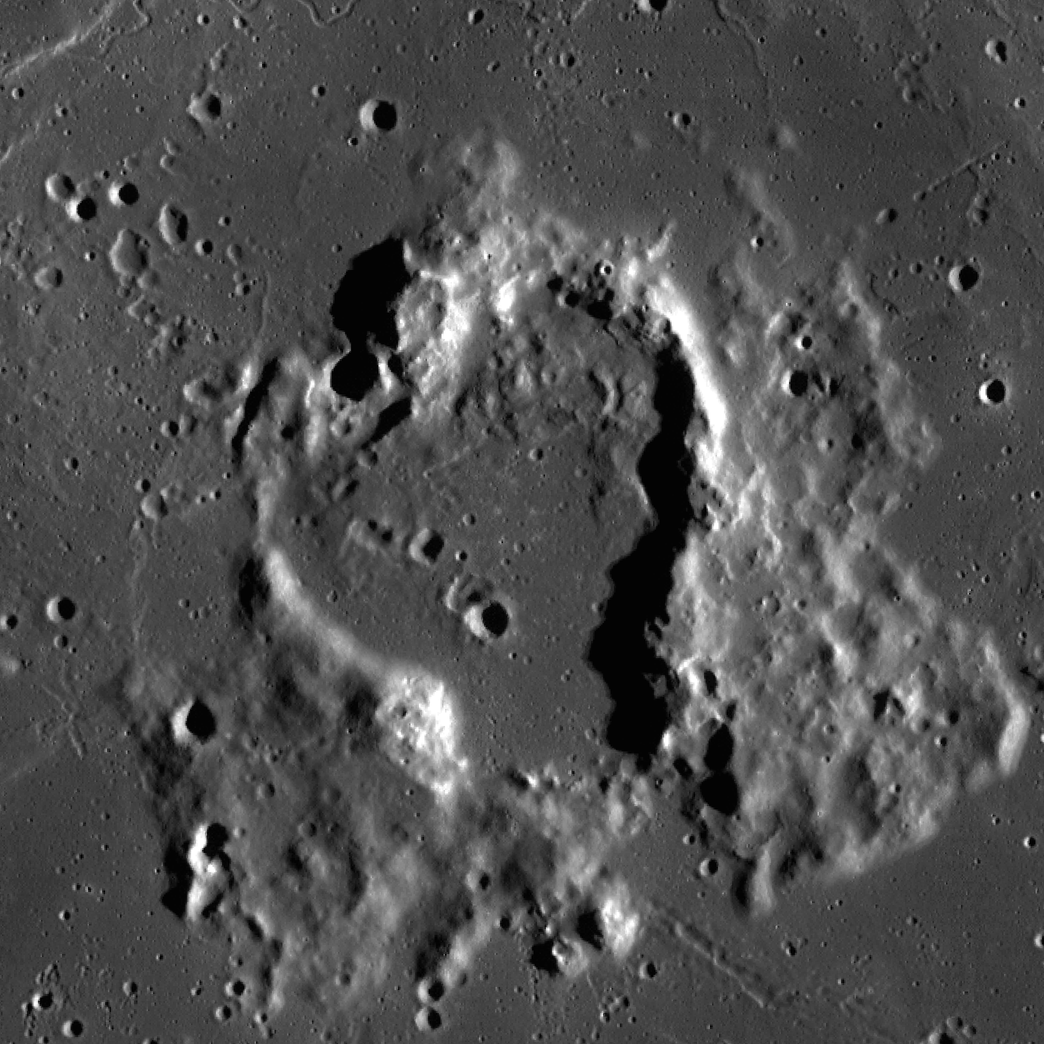
- Lunar Reconnaissance Orbiter image
- Coordinates: 22.7°S 16.6°W
- Diameter: 25.74 km
- Colongitude: 17° at sunrise
- Eponym: M. F. Wolf

Wolf is a lunar impact crater that lies in the south-central part of the Mare Nubium, a lunar mare in the southern hemisphere of the Moon. It lies to the north-northwest of the walled plain named Pitatus, and east-southeast of the prominent crater Bullialdus. It is named after the German astronomer Max Wolf.

The interior floor of this crater has been completely flooded by lava, leaving only an irregular, broken rim projecting slightly above the surface. The surviving rim is not quite circular, having outward bulges to the north and west. It rises to a maximum height of about 0.7 km. The smaller crater Wolf B has overlaid the southern rim, and the two have now merged into one formation. Low ridges connect to the exterior rim to the east and south.

== Satellite craters ==
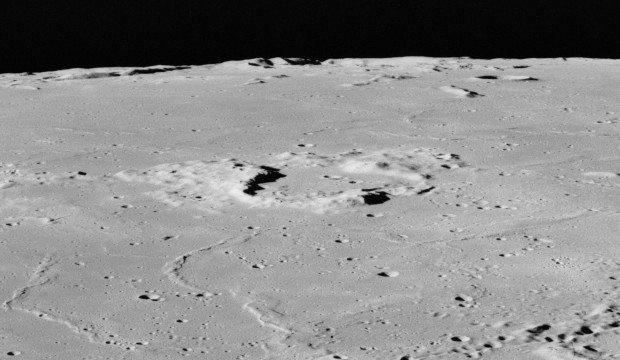
Oblique view of Wolf from Apollo 16, facing south

By convention these features are identified on lunar maps by placing the letter on the side of the crater midpoint that is closest to Wolf.

Wolf	Latitude	Longitude	Diameter	Ref
A	22.2° S	18.4° W	5.59 km	WGPSN
B	23.1° S	16.4° W	15.11 km	WGPSN
C	24.1° S	14.5° W	2.65 km	WGPSN
E	23.9° S	16.3° W	2.31 km	WGPSN
F	22.0° S	14.9° W	2.34 km	WGPSN
G	22.5° S	16.8° W	5.7 km	WGPSN
H	23.0° S	14.7° W	7.75 km	WGPSN
S	21.2° S	16.5° W	29.84 km	WGPSN
T	23.4° S	18.8° W	27.1 km	WGPSN

== See also ==
- 827 Wolfiana
- 1217 Maximiliana
- Mons Wolff (Montes Apenninus)
