= Oppelt =

Oppelt is a German surname. Notable people with the surname include:

- Britta Oppelt (born 1978), German rower
- Kurt Oppelt (1932–2015), Austrian figure skater
- Moritz Oppelt (born 1989), German politician
- Valérie Oppelt (born 1973), French politician

== See also ==
- Oppel
