= Pitatus (crater) =

Crater on the Moon

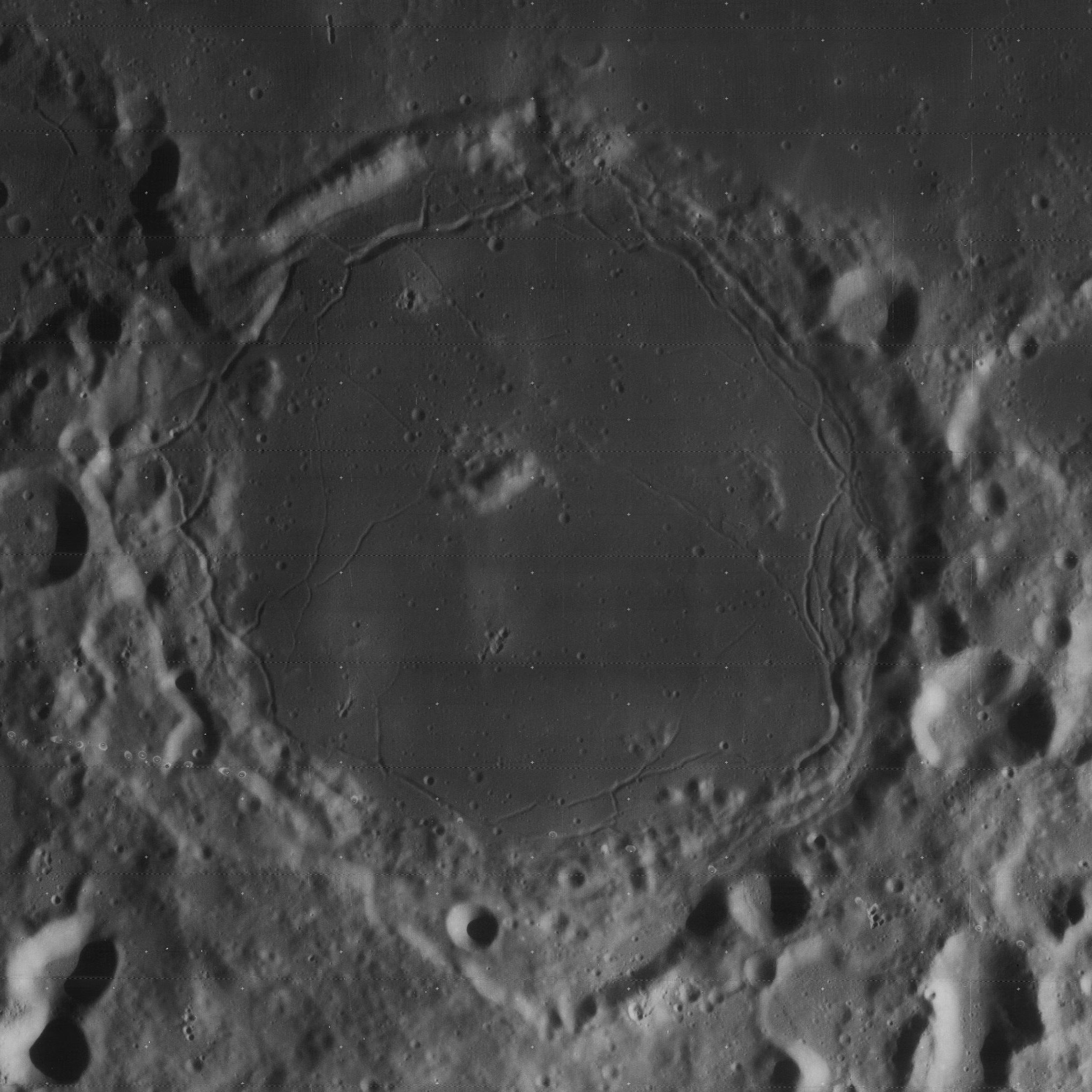
- Lunar Orbiter 4 image
- Coordinates: 29.88°S 13.53°W
- Diameter: 100.63 km
- Depth: 0.68 km
- Colongitude: 13° at sunrise
- Formation: Nectarian
- Eponym: Pietro Pitati

Pitatus is an ancient lunar impact crater located at the southern edge of Mare Nubium. It was named after Italian astronomer Pietro Pitati by the IAU in 1935. Joined to the northwest rim is the crater Hesiodus, and the two are joined by a narrow cleft. To the south lie the attached Wurzelbauer and Gauricus.

== Description ==
This formation dates to the Nectarian epoch of the lunar geologic timescale. The complex wall of Pitatus is heavily worn, and has been encroached by lava flows. The rim is lowest to the north, where the lava almost joins the Mare Nubium. Near the middle is a low central peak that is offset to the northwest of center. This peak only rises to a height of 0.5 km.

Pitatus is a floor-fractured crater. The flooded crater floor contains low hills in the east and a system of slender clefts named the Rimae Pitatus. The larger and more spectacular of these rilles follow the edges of the inner walls, especially in the northern and eastern halves. The floor also contains the faint traces of deposited ray markings.

Just to the north of Pitatus in the neighboring mare is the half-buried rim of Pitatus S, covered in the past when the basalts of Mare Nubium filled it.

== Satellite craters ==
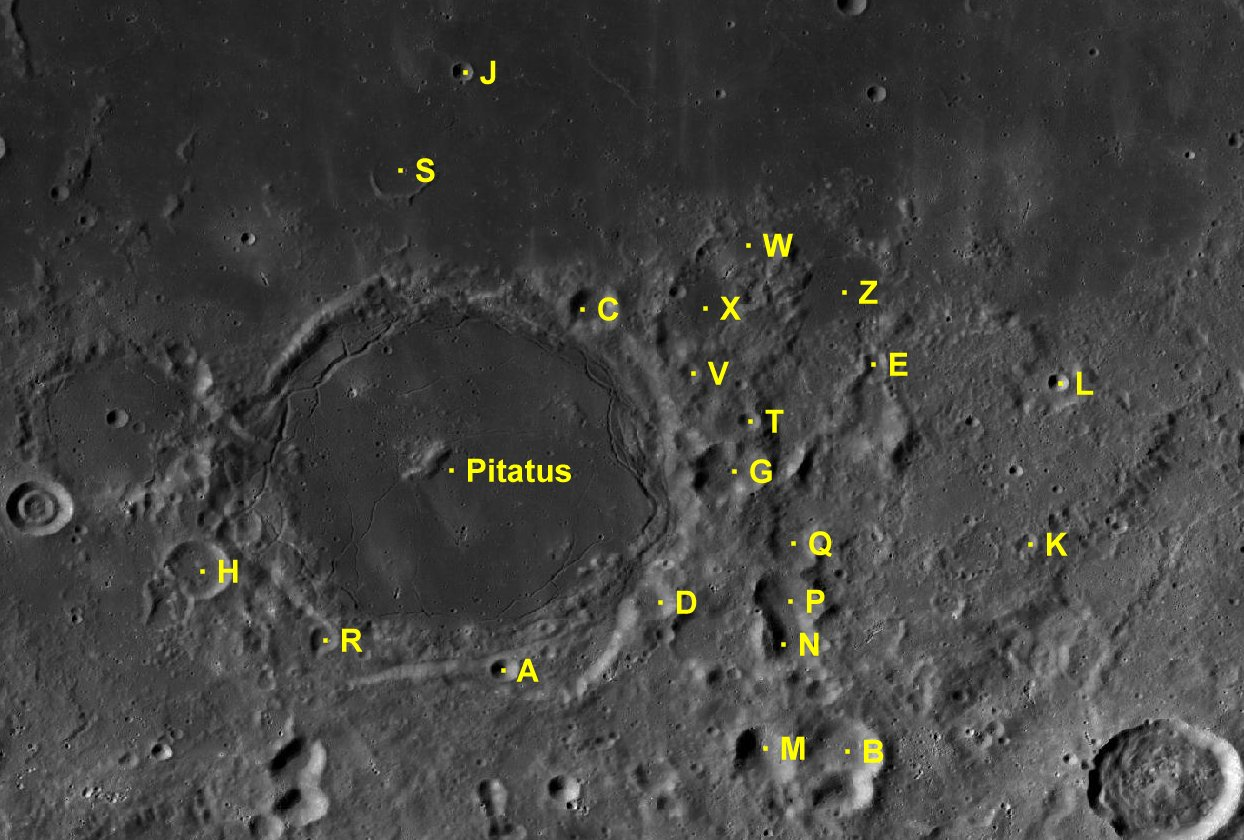
Pitatus and its satellite craters

By convention these features are identified on lunar maps by placing the letter on the side of the crater midpoint that is closest to Pitatus.

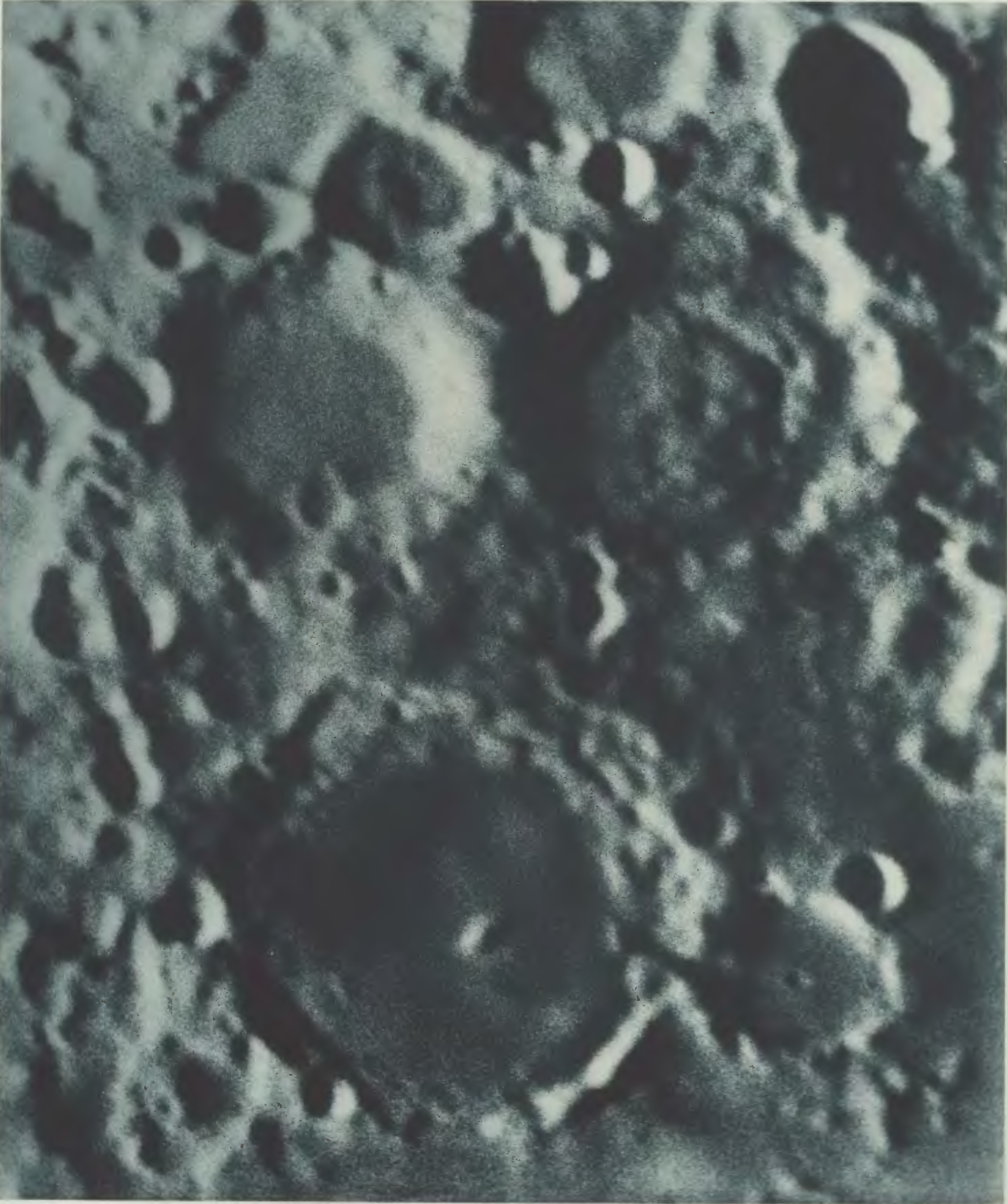
Pitatus crater in the Lunar Atlas (1898) by Ladislaus Weinek. North on the photo is downward

Pitatus	Latitude	Longitude	Diameter
A	31.4° S	13.2° W	7 km
B	32.3° S	10.4° W	16 km
C	28.4° S	12.4° W	12 km
D	30.9° S	12.0° W	10 km
E	28.9° S	10.1° W	6 km
G	29.8° S	11.4° W	18 km
H	30.5° S	15.7° W	15 km
J	26.5° S	13.5° W	5 km
K	30.4° S	8.9° W	6 km
L	29.1° S	8.6° W	5 km
M	32.1° S	11.0° W	14 km
N	31.2° S	10.9° W	21 km
P	31.0° S	10.9° W	16 km
Q	30.5° S	10.8° W	12 km
R	31.1° S	14.6° W	7 km
S	27.3° S	14.0° W	12 km
T	29.4° S	11.2° W	5 km
V	28.9° S	11.7° W	5 km
W	27.9° S	11.2° W	13 km
X	28.4° S	11.6° W	19 km
Z	28.3° S	10.3° W	25 km
