= Mare Nubium =

Lunar surface depression

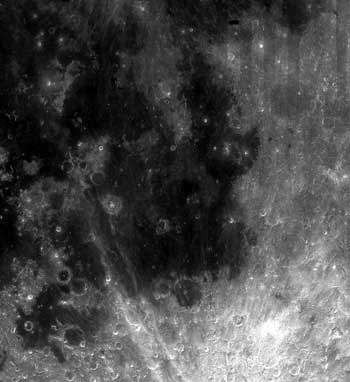
- Mare Nubium
- Coordinates: 21.3°S 16.6°W
- Diameter: 715 km (444 mi)
- Eponym: Sea of Clouds

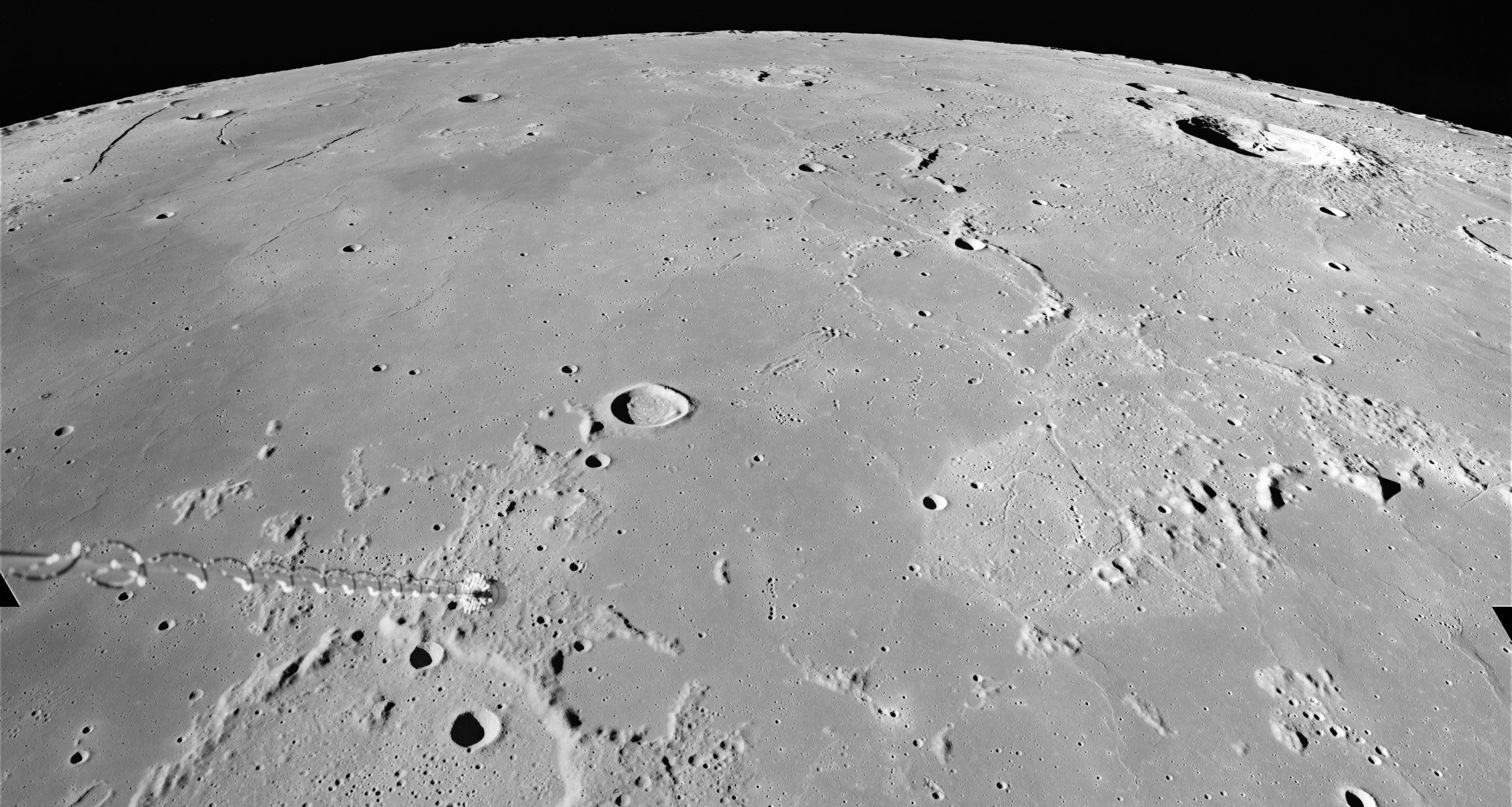
Oblique view of northern Mare Nubium from Apollo 16.

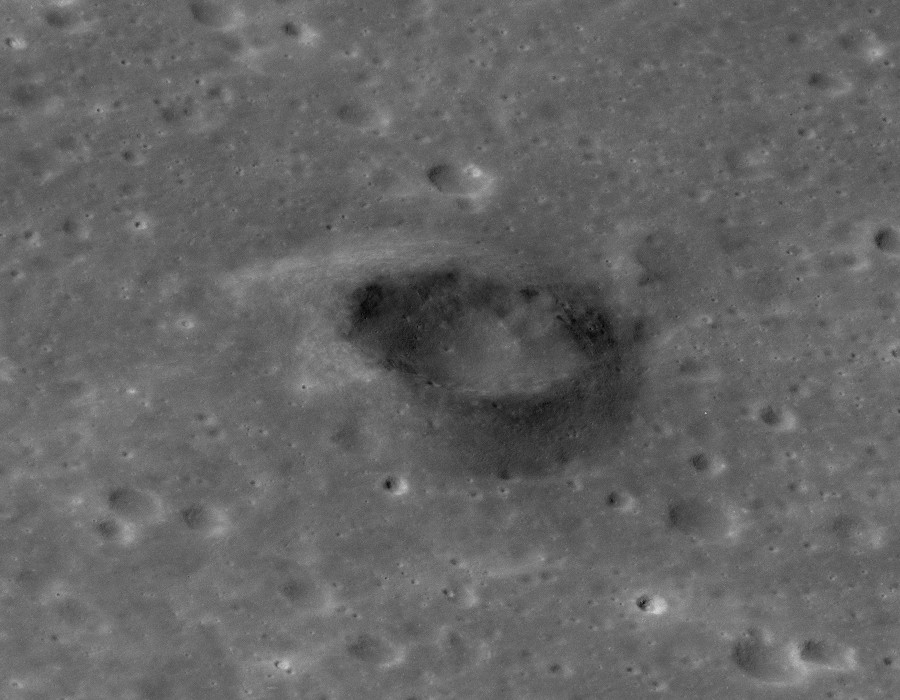
Volcanic feature in Mare Nubium

Mare Nubium /ˈnjuːbiəm/ (Latin nūbium, the "Sea of Clouds") is a lunar mare in the Nubium basin on the Moon's near side. The mare is located just to the southeast of Oceanus Procellarum.

== Formation ==
The basin containing Mare Nubium is believed to have been part of the Pre-Nectarian system. The mare material is of the Imbrian and Eratosthenian age.

Bullialdus crater, a prominent feature on the west side of the mare, is of Eratosthenian age. Other features within the mare include Pitatus on the southern margin and Guericke bounding the mare to the north. Opelt, Gould, Kies, Nicollet, Wolf, Birt, and Rupes Recta (the Straight Wall) lie within the mare.

== Names ==
Like most of the other maria on the Moon, Mare Nubium was named by Giovanni Riccioli, whose 1651 nomenclature system has become standardized. Previously, William Gilbert had included it among the Continens Meridionalis ("Southern Continent") in his map of c.1600, and Michael van Langren had labelled it the Mare Borbonicum (after the House of Bourbon) in his 1645 map.

== Exploration ==
The first released images from the Lunar Reconnaissance Orbiter in 2009 were of the lunar highlands 200 km south of Mare Nubium.

== News ==
In September 2013, Spanish astronomers observed and recorded an impact event when a large rock hit the lunar surface in Mare Nubium.
