= Birt (crater) =

Crater on the Moon

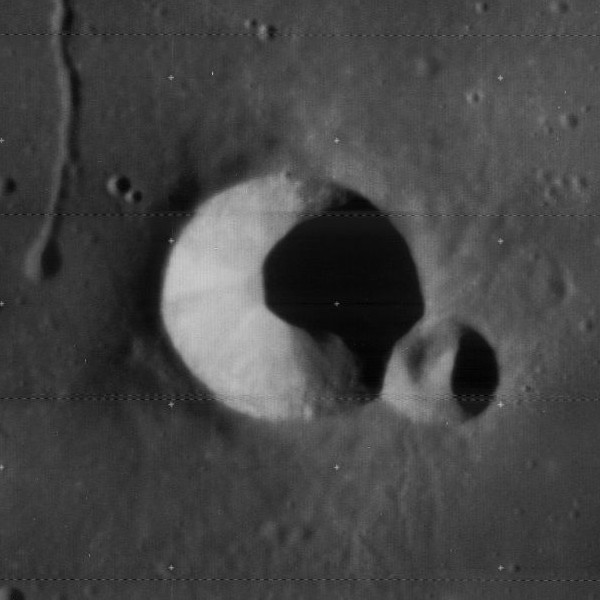
- Coordinates: 22.4°S 8.5°W
- Diameter: 15.81 km (9.82 mi)
- Depth: 3.47 km (2.16 mi)
- Colongitude: 9° at sunrise
- Eponym: William R. Birt

Birt is a lunar impact crater located in the eastern half of the Mare Nubium and west of the Rupes Recta, the "Straight Wall". Patrick Moore called this, "a very interesting little crater". Birt is a bowl-shaped formation with a raised rim, slightly intersected along the southeast edge by the much smaller crater Birt A. The inner wall displays two dusky radial bands. To the west of Birt, a rille named Rima Birt runs north-northwest in an arc from Birt F to Birt E.

This crater was named after British selenographer William R. Birt (1804-1881). Its name was incorporated into lunar nomenclature by German astronomer J. F. Julius Schmidt in 1878. The designation was officially adopted by the International Astronomical Union in 1935.

== Birt during full moon ==
High albedo crater Birt, on the southeastern section of the dark Mare Nubium, is an easy to detect and to observe formation during full moon. Birt forms, with bright satellite crater Thebit A due east, a wide pair. Both bright craters are also noticeable on the photographic version of chart LAC 95 (page 190) in The Clementine Atlas of the Moon (Ben Bussey / Paul D. Spudis).

== Satellite craters ==
By convention these features are identified on lunar maps by placing the letter on the side of the crater midpoint that is closest to Birt.

| Birt | Latitude | Longitude | Diameter |
|---|---|---|---|
| A | 22.5° S | 8.2° W | 7 km |
| B | 22.2° S | 10.2° W | 5 km |
| C | 23.7° S | 8.3° W | 2 km |
| D | 21.0° S | 9.8° W | 3 km |
| E | 20.7° S | 9.6° W | 5 km |
| F | 22.3° S | 9.1° W | 3 km |
| G | 23.1° S | 8.2° W | 2 km |
| H | 23.0° S | 9.1° W | 2 km |
| J | 23.0° S | 9.4° W | 2 km |
| K | 22.4° S | 9.7° W | 2 km |
| L | 21.6° S | 9.3° W | 3 km |

== Gallery ==
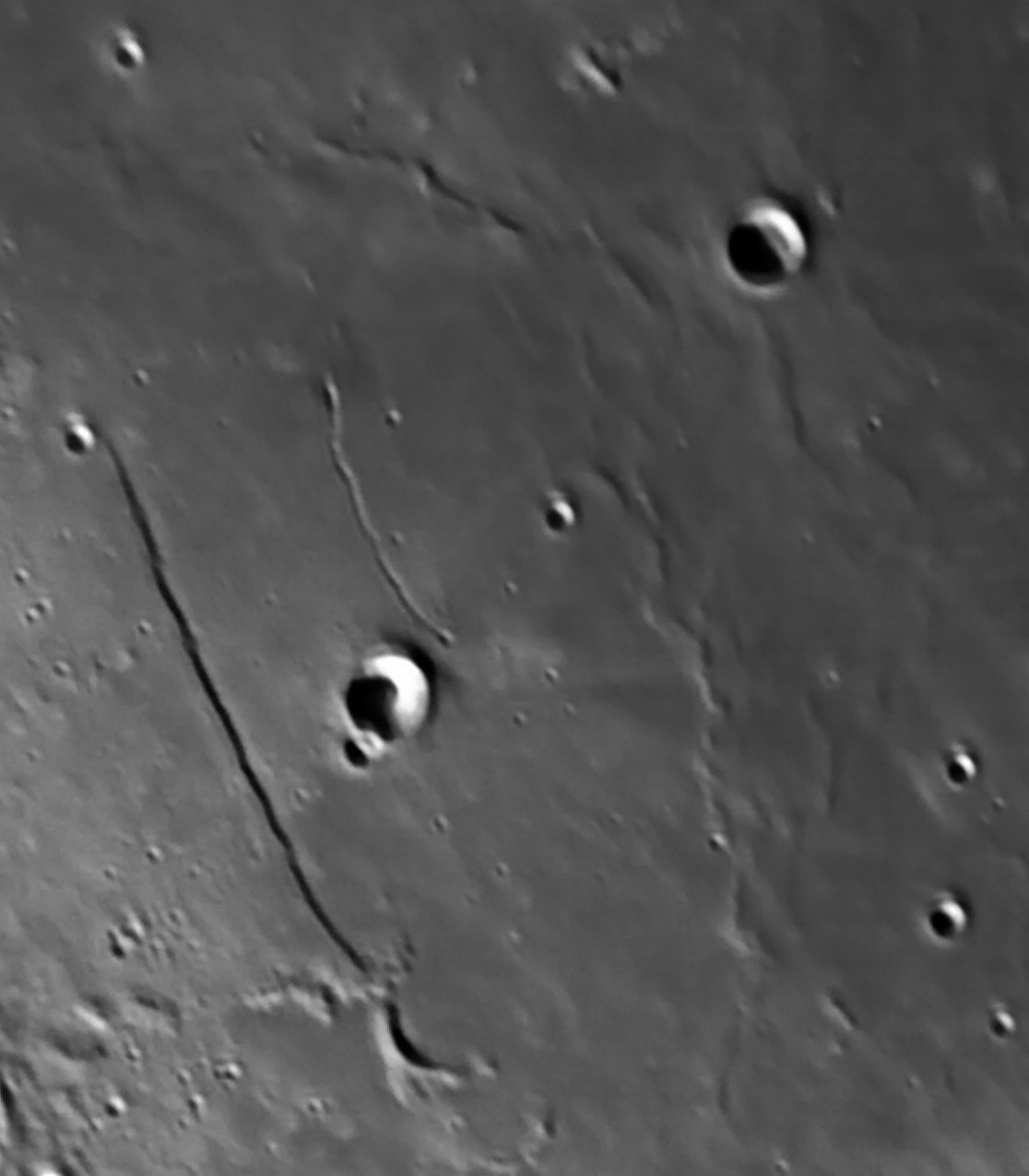
The crater Birt is at lower left centre, from Apollo 16

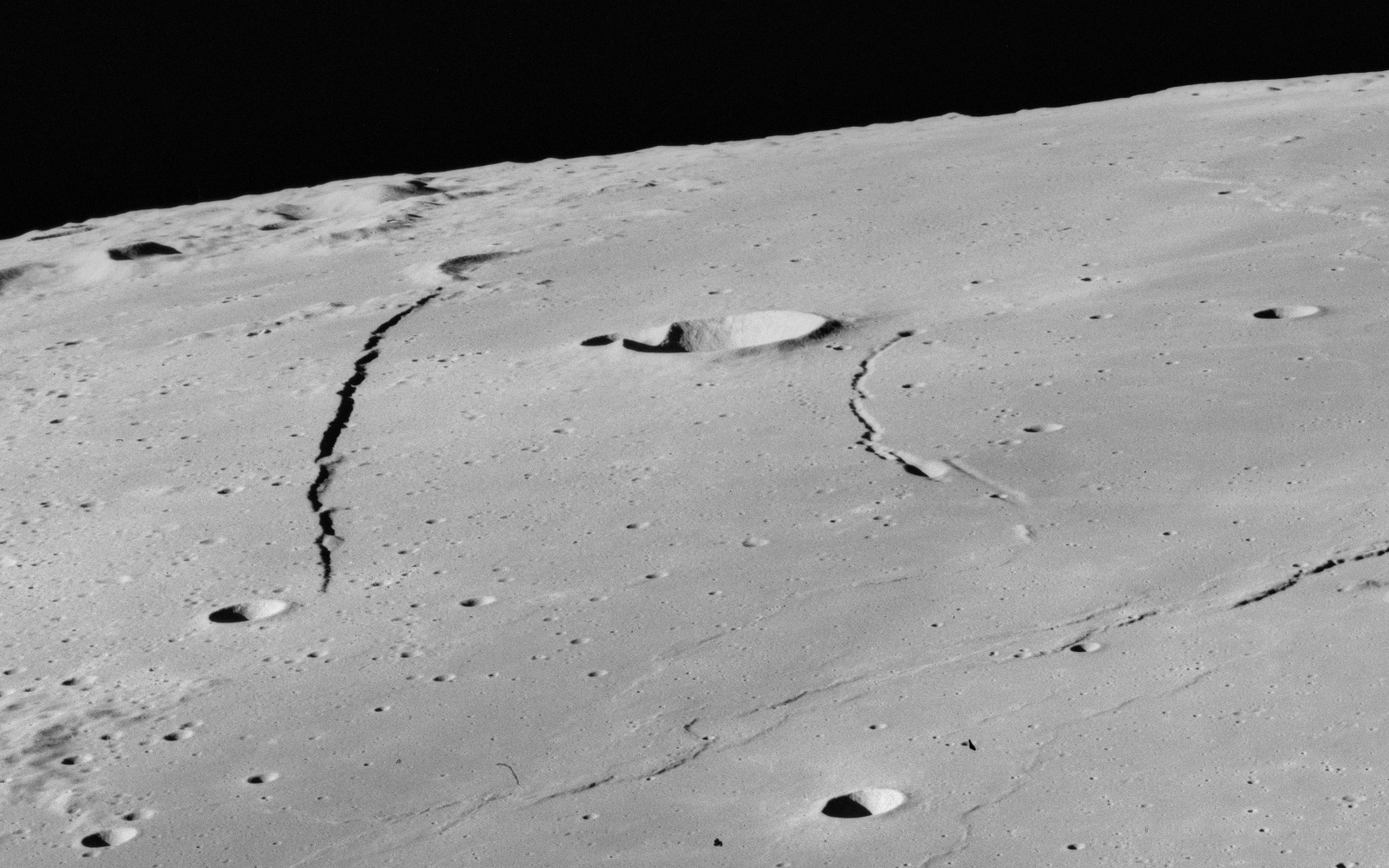
Oblique view of Rupes Recta (left), Birt (center), and Rima Birt (right), from Apollo 16
