= Friedrich Wilhelm Opelt =

Musicologist, mathematician and astronomer

Friedrich Wilhelm Opelt (9 June 1794 – 22 September 1863) was a musicologist, a mathematician, and an astronomer. At one point, he held the title of Geheimrat (the title of the highest advising officials at the Imperial, royal or principal courts of the Holy Roman Empire).

== Biography ==
Friedrich Opelt was the son of a weaver who specialized in fustian and owned a weavery mill. After he successfully completed his education at the City School of his home town in Rochlitz, he learned the trade of a weaver as his father wished. During this time, a musical autodidact, he could often accompany, on organ, the church service at the Petrikirche (City Church). Through further autodidactic studies, he learned French and Russian, in addition to several other languages. His financial successes at trade shows (Leipzig, Frankfurt) gave him the idea to expand his businesses, which were eventually halted during the Napoleonic Wars.

== Occupation ==
After the German Campaign of 1813, Opelt became employed in the Municipality of Dresden as a tax auditor, and a few years later he was appointed as tax collector in Radeberg. In 1824 he became the county tax collector for Wurzen, and eight years later he was appointed as county tax collector to Plauen. The peak of Opelt's tax-auditing career was in 1839, during which he became a high-ranking member of the county council in Dresden.

In 1847, Opelt became the Second Director of the Saxon-Bavarian Railway Company in Leipzig. The following year, he became a privy financial adviser to the royal treasury in Dresden. In the spring of 1863, he resigned from all his posts and retired into private life.

Opelt died at the age of 69 years on September 22, 1863 in Dresden.

== Works ==
As an author:

- Über die Natur der Musik. Plauen 1834.
- Allgemeine Theorie der Musik auf dem Rhythmus der Klangwellenpulse und durch neue Versinnlichungsmittel erläutert. Leipzig 1852.

As a translator:

- Louis-Benjamin Francoeur: Elementar-Lehrbuch der Mechanik. Arnold, Dresden 1825.
