= Le Verrier (disambiguation) =

Le Verrier may refer to:

== Notable people with the surname Le Verrier ==
- Urbain Le Verrier (1811–1877), a French mathematician who specialized in celestial mechanics
- Max Le Verrier (1891–1973), French sculptor who specialized in Art Deco decorative objects.

== Other uses ==
- Le Verrier (lunar crater)
- Le Verrier (Martian crater)
- 1997 Leverrier, a main-belt asteroid
- French frigate Le Verrier, a ship
