= Bouguer =

Bouguer may refer to:

- Jean Bouguer (d. 1714), French hydrographer and mathematician
- Pierre Bouguer (1698-1758), French mathematician, geophysicist, geodesist, and astronomer; son of Jean Bouguer
- Bouguer (lunar crater), impact crater named after Pierre Bouguer
- Bouguer (Martian crater), another impact crater named after Pierre Bouguer
- 8190 Bouguer, main-belt asteroid named after Pierre Bouguer
