= Montes Jura =

Mountain range on The Moon

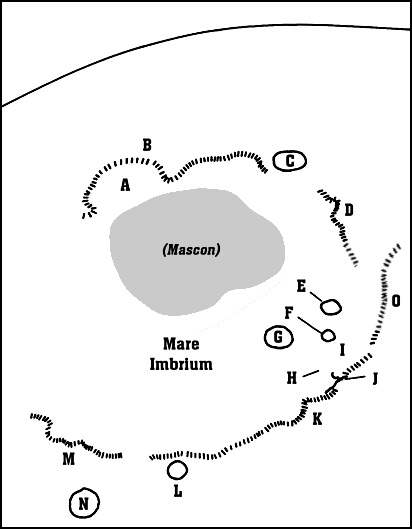
- Detail map of Mare Imbrium's features. Montes Jura is the feature marked "B"

Highest point
- Listing: Lunar mountains

Geography
- Location: the Moon

Montes Jura is a mountain range in the northwest part of the near side of the Moon. The selenographic coordinates of this range are 47.1° N 34.0° W. It has a diameter of 422 km, with mountains rising to approximately 3,800m above the level of Sinus Iridum. They were named after the Jura Mountains in eastern France and western Switzerland.

== Description ==
This range of mountains form a visually pleasing semi-circular ring around the Sinus Iridum, a bay along the northwestern edge of Mare Imbrium. The blunt, east-facing cape at the southwestern end of the range is named Promontorium Heraclides, while the east-facing wedge at the northeast end is called Promontorium Laplace. The only crater of note in this range is Bianchini, which lies across the north-northwestern portion of the curve. A little farther to the west is Sharp, and to the northeast is the ruined crater Maupertuis.

== Appearance ==
As the terminator advances near this range two to three nights after the first quarter moon, the peaks of this range catch the sunlight at their tops. This produces a string of bright points that have been described as Jeweled Scimitar or Golden Handle.

A small version of the chiaroscuro effect at Montes Jura is also noticeable at the western section of the rim of Alexander, north of Mare Serenitatis, when the morning terminator runs at 17° east.

The 1679 lunar map by Giovanni Cassini included a figure of "The Moon Maiden", her facial profile formed by Promontorium Heraclides, her hair by the hills to the west, and her body by Montes Jura. She appears upside down when viewed in binoculars from the Northern Hemisphere.

== Origin ==
In the distant past this range once formed the outer wall of a crater about 260 km in diameter, which formed after the Imbrium impact. The southeast face of this crater was then removed and the interior flooded with basaltic lava. As a result, the side of the range facing the mare ends in the nearly level plains, which the opposite side merges with a region of rough and irregular terrain.
