= 1997 Leverrier =

Stony main-belt asteroid

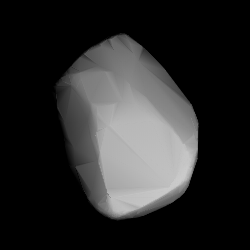
- Leverrier modeled from its lightcurve

Discovery
- Discovered by: Indiana University (Indiana Asteroid Program)
- Discovery site: Goethe Link Obs.
- Discovery date: 14 September 1963

Designations
- Named after: Urbain Le Verrier (mathematician)
- Alternative designations: 1963 RC · 1940 SF; 1950 TS_{3} · 1953 QB; 1973 SX_{4} · 1973 UF
- Minor planet category: main-belt · Flora

Orbital characteristics
- Epoch 4 September 2017 (JD 2458000.5)
- Uncertainty parameter 0
- Observation arc: 66.72 yr (24,370 days)
- Aphelion: 2.6660 AU
- Perihelion: 1.7520 AU
- Semi-major axis: 2.2090 AU
- Eccentricity: 0.2069
- Orbital period (sidereal): 3.28 yr (1,199 days)
- Mean anomaly: 153.46°
- Mean motion: 0° 18^{m} 0.72^{s} / day
- Inclination: 6.0689°
- Longitude of ascending node: 353.22°
- Argument of perihelion: 0.6461°

Physical characteristics
- Mean diameter: 6.81±0.7 km (IRAS:2); 6.83 km (derived)
- Synodic rotation period: 8.01532±0.00001 h
- Geometric albedo: 0.1662±0.040 (IRAS:2); 0.1811 (derived)
- Spectral type: S
- Absolute magnitude (H): 13.3

1997 Leverrier (prov. designation: 1963 RC) is a stony Flora asteroid from the inner regions of the asteroid belt. It was discovered on 14 September 1963, by the Indiana Asteroid Program at Goethe Link Observatory near Brooklyn, Indiana, United States, and named after French mathematician Urbain Le Verrier. The asteroid has a rotation period of 6.8 hours and measures approximately 7 kilometers (4.3 miles) in diameter.

== Classification and orbit ==
Leverrier is an S-type asteroid and member of the Flora family, one of the largest families of stony asteroids. It orbits the Sun in the inner main-belt at a distance of 1.8–2.7 AU once every 3 years and 3 months (1,199 days). Its orbit has an eccentricity of 0.21 and an inclination of 6° with respect to the ecliptic. It was first observed as 1940 SF at the Abastuman Observatory (119) in Georgia on 28 September 1940. Its first used observation was made at Palomar Observatory in 1950, extending the body's observation arc by 13 years prior to the official discovery observation.

== Naming ==
This minor planet was named after French mathematician Urbain Le Verrier (1811–1877). In 1846, he predicted the existence and position of the planet Neptune by applying the mathematics of celestial mechanics. The Martian and lunar craters Le Verrier are also named in his honor. Its name was suggested by MPC-director Brian G. Marsden, after whom the minor planet 1877 Marsden is named. The official naming citation was published by the Minor Planet Center on 15 October 1977 (M.P.C. 4237).

== Physical characteristics ==
In March 2016, a modeled rotation period for Leverrier was published using data from the Lowell Photometric Database (LPD). Using lightcurve inversion and convex shape models, as well as distributed computing power and the help of individual volunteers, a period of 8.015 hours could be obtained for this asteroid from the LPD's sparse-in-time photometry data (U=n.a.).

According to the survey carried out by the Infrared Astronomical Satellite IRAS, Leverrier measures 6.8 kilometers in diameter and its surface has an albedo of 0.166. The Collaborative Asteroid Lightcurve Link derives an albedo of 0.181 and a concurring diameter of 6.8 kilometers, with an absolute magnitude of 13.3. When using a generic magnitude-to-diameter conversion, its mean diameter is between 6 and 14 kilometers for an assumed albedo in the range of 0.05 to 0.25.
