= Bouguer (lunar crater) =

Crater on the Moon

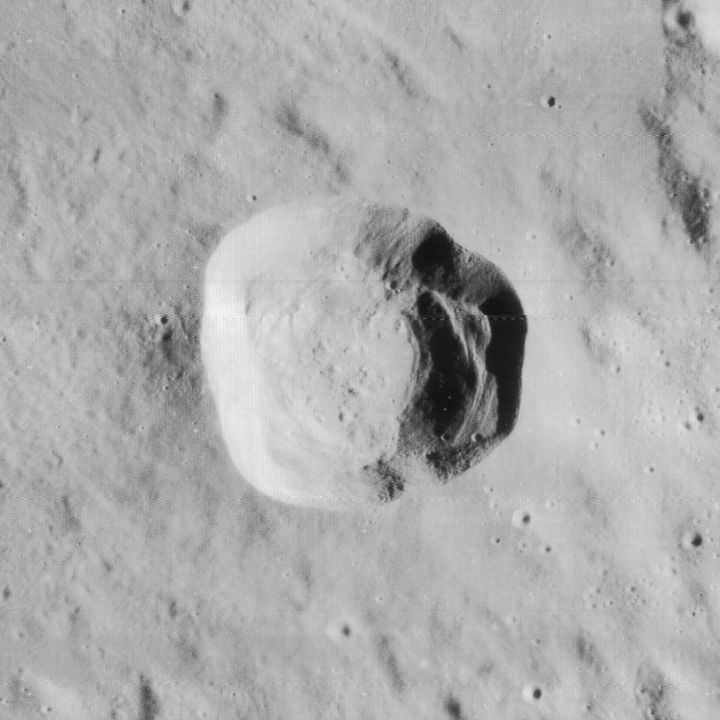
- Lunar Orbiter 4 image
- Coordinates: 52.3°N 35.8°W
- Diameter: 22.23 km (13.81 mi)
- Depth: 2.5 km (1.6 mi)
- Colongitude: 36° at sunrise
- Eponym: Pierre Bouguer

Bouguer is a lunar impact crater that lies along the southern edge of the Mare Frigoris, to the north of the crater Bianchini. To the west-southwest of Bouguer, along the same shore of the mare, is the crater Foucault. Nearly due west is the more prominent Harpalus, and to the east is La Condamine.

This is a relatively young crater with well-defined edge. The formation is relatively circular, but there are slight outward bulges to the east, north-northwest, and southwest. There is some evidence of slumping in the eastern bulge. The interior floor occupies about half the crater diameter, and is relatively level and featureless.

This crater is named after French hydrographer Pierre Bouguer (1698-1758). His name was introduced into lunar nomenclature by German astronomer J. H. von Mädler during the 19th century. Its designation was formally adopted by the International Astronomical Union in 1935.

== Satellite craters ==
By convention these features are identified on lunar maps by placing the letter on the side of the crater midpoint that is closest to Bouguer.

Bouguer	Latitude	Longitude	Diameter
A	52.5° N	33.8° W	8 km
B	53.3° N	33.0° W	7 km
