= Maupertuis (crater) =

Crater on the Moon

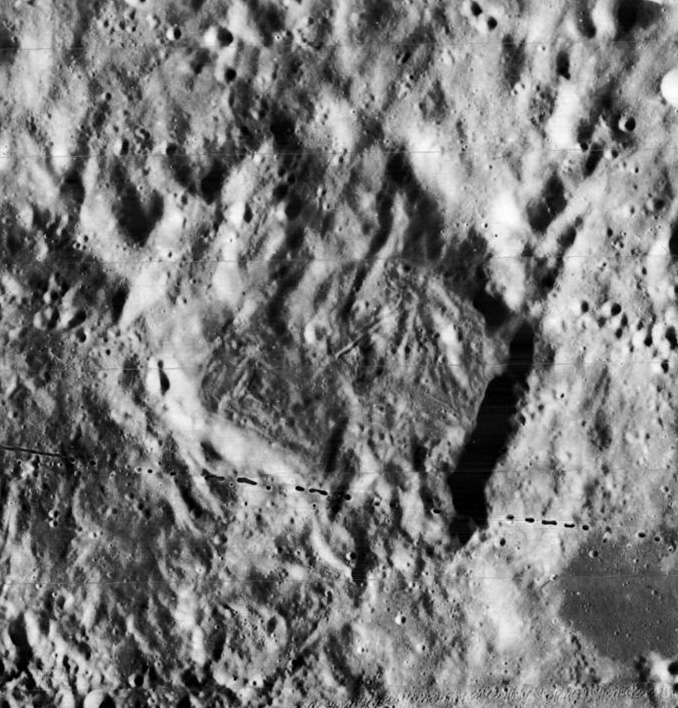
- Lunar Orbiter 4 image
- Coordinates: 49.6°N 27.3°W
- Diameter: 45.49 km
- Depth: 1.5 km
- Colongitude: 28° at sunrise
- Formation: Lower Imbrian
- Eponym: Pierre Louis Maupertuis

Maupertuis is the remnant of a lunar impact crater that is located in the northern part of the Moon's near side. It lies in the stretch of rugged terrain north of Sinus Iridum, a bay in the northwestern corner of Mare Imbrium. To the north lies the crater La Condamine, and Mare Frigoris.

This is a crater that has been nearly obliterated by a history of impacts, leaving only a disintegrated remnant of the original rim. The surviving outer rim is not especially circular, having been reshaped into a somewhat pentagonal outline. There are deep gouges from cratering along the northeastern rim. The interior floor is not in much better shape, being rough and irregular.

To the northeast of this crater is a system of rilles designated Rimae Maupertuis. These are considered to have formed through geological activity. Good eyesight and a large telescope are required to observe these rilles.

The crater was named for the French mathematician and astronomer Pierre Louis Maupertuis (1698–1759).

Maupertuis is a crater of Lower (Early) Imbrian age.

== Satellite craters ==
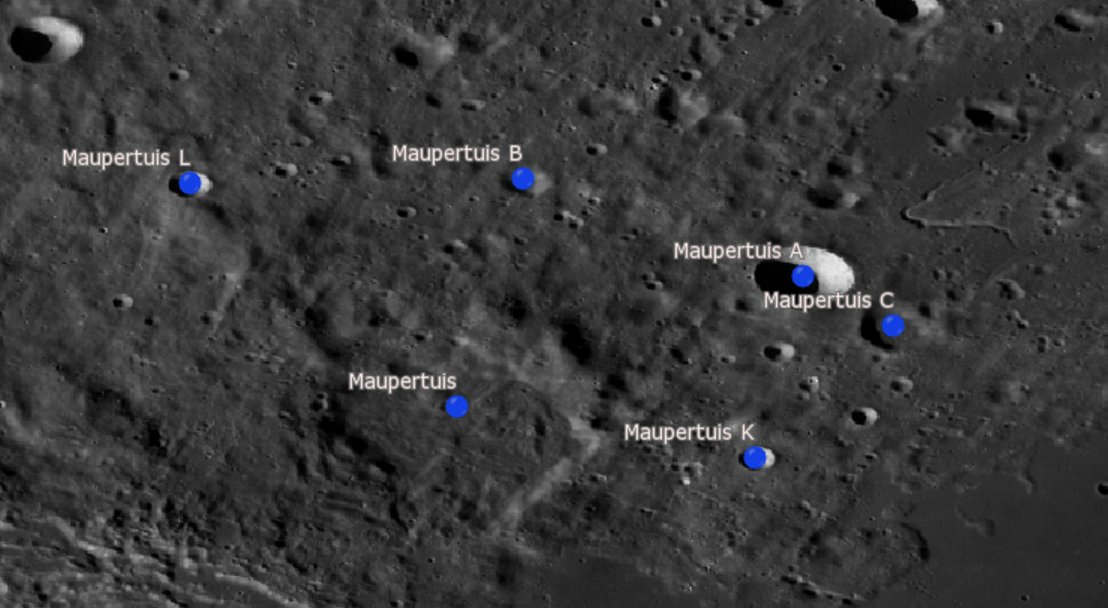
Maupertuis and its satellite craters

Maupertuis	Latitude	Longitude	Diameter	Ref
A	50.6° N	24.7° W	13.91 km	WGPSN
B	51.3° N	26.7° W	6.07 km	WGPSN
C	50.2° N	24.0° W	10.47 km	WGPSN
K	49.3° N	25.0° W	5.28 km	WGPSN
L	51.3° N	29.2° W	6.21 km	WGPSN

== See also ==
- Asteroid 3281 Maupertuis
