= Helicon (crater) =

Crater on the Moon

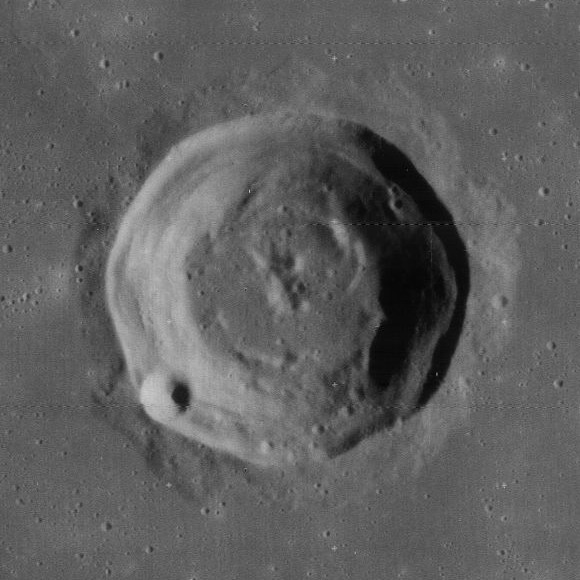
- Lunar Orbiter 4 image
- Coordinates: 40.4°N 23.1°W
- Diameter: 25 km
- Depth: 0.5 km
- Colongitude: 23° at sunrise
- Formation: Imbrian
- Eponym: Helicon of Cyzicus

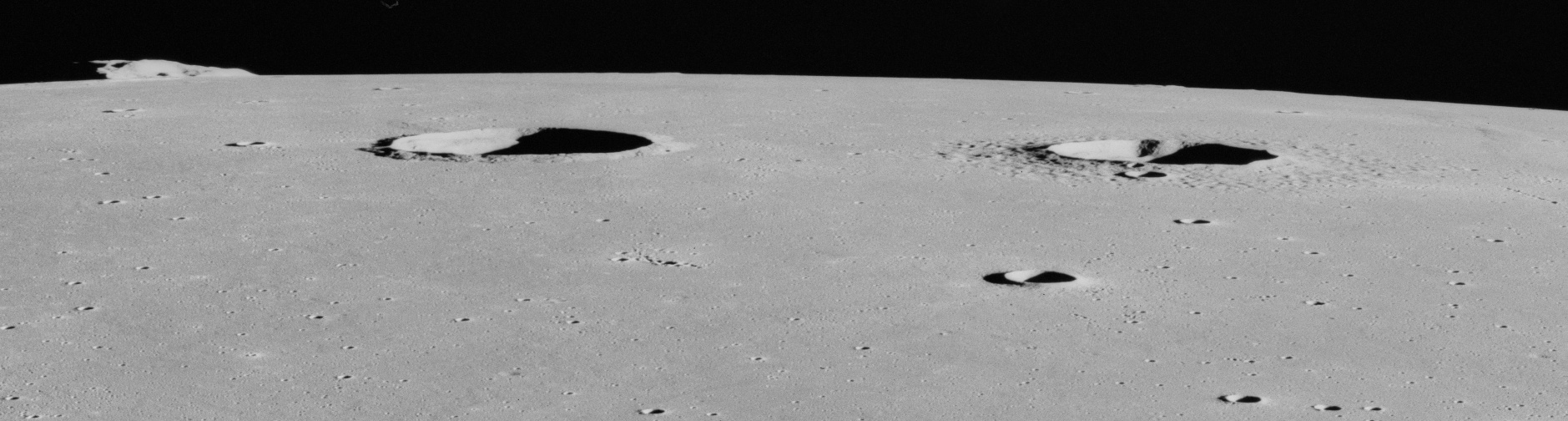
Highly oblique view of Helicon (left) and Le Verrier (right). The mountain on the horizon at left is Promontorium Laplace, about 180 km beyond Helicon. Note that Helicon's ejecta is buried by the mare lava, but Le Verrier's is not. From Apollo 15.

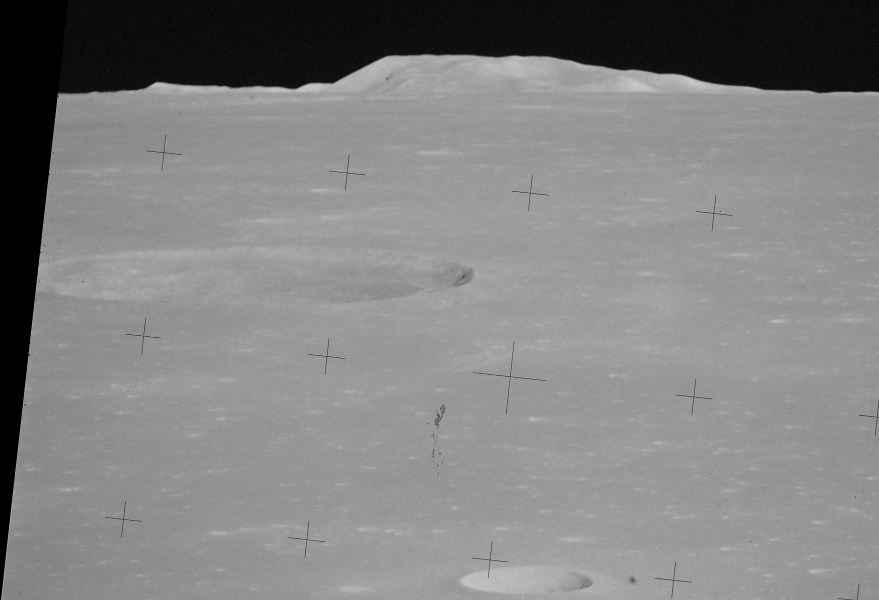
Another oblique view of Helicon (left), at a higher sun angle. Also from Apollo 15.

Helicon is a small lunar impact crater that is located on the north part of the Mare Imbrium. The crater was named after 4th century BC Greek astronomer Helicon of Cyzicus, a friend and disciple of Plato. To the northwest is the prominent Sinus Iridum, a mountain-ringed bay on the mare. Just to the east is the slightly smaller crater Le Verrier.

Helicon is a nearly circular formation with inner walls that curve down to a relatively flat floor. There is a tiny craterlet located at the midpoint of the interior, and a small craterlet along the southwestern rim.

== Satellite craters ==
According to convention these features are identified on lunar maps by placing the letter on the side of the crater midpoint that is closest to Helicon.

Helicon	Latitude	Longitude	Diameter
B	38.0° N	21.3° W	6 km
C	40.1° N	26.2° W	1 km
E	40.5° N	24.1° W	3 km
G	41.7° N	24.9° W	2 km
