= Birch bark letter no. 292 =

Oldest document in any Finnic language

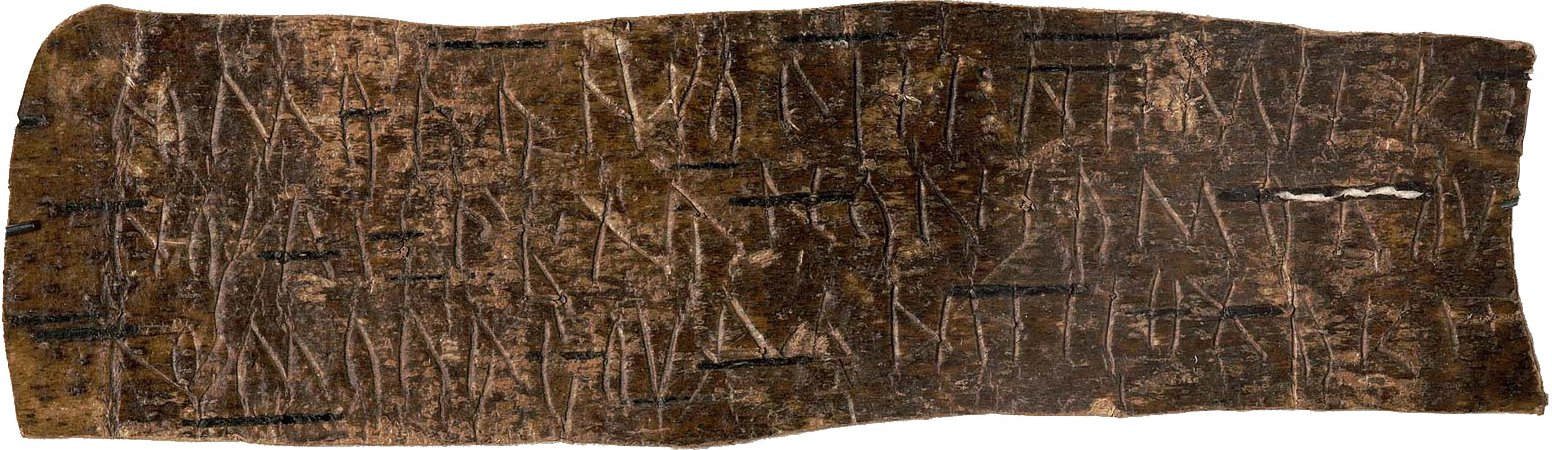
Birch-bark letter No. 292

Birch bark letter no. 292 is a birch bark letter that is the oldest known document in any Finnic language. The document is dated to the beginning of the 13th century and is written in the Cyrillic script. It was found in 1957 by a Soviet expedition led by Artemiy Artsikhovsky in the Nerevsky excavation on the left coast side of Novgorod. It is currently held at the Novgorod City Museum.

The language used in the document is thought to be an archaic form of Livvi-Karelian, the language spoken in Olonets Karelia, although the exact form is difficult to determine, as Finnic dialects were still developing during that period.

== Transcription ==
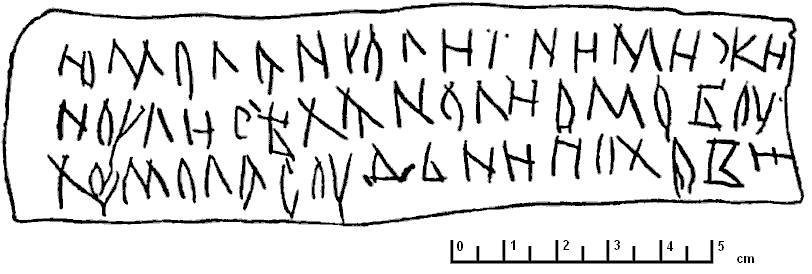

The text is written in Cyrillic in a Finnic language variety that is closer to modern Karelian or Veps. A transcription of the text is as follows:

юмолануолиїнимижи
ноулисѣханолиомобоу
юмоласоудьнииохови

== Interpretations ==
=== By Yuri Yeliseyev ===
The text, as transliterated to the Latin alphabet by Yuri Yeliseyev in 1959 and interpreted in modern Finnish:

jumolanuoli ï nimizi

nouli se han oli omo bou

jumola soud'ni iohovi

Jumalannuoli, kymmenen [on] nimesi

Tämä nuoli on Jumalan oma

Tuomion-Jumala johtaa.

In English, this means roughly the following:

God's arrow, ten [is] your name
This arrow is God's own

The Doom-God leads.

Yeliseyev believes that this is an invocation against lightning, as evidenced by "ten your names" construction. According to superstitious notions, knowledge of the name gives a human the magic power over an object or phenomenon.

=== By Martti Haavio ===
As the orthography used does not utilize spaces between words, the source text can be transcribed into words in different ways. Martti Haavio gives a different interpretation of the text in his 1964 article, suggesting, that this is a sort of an oath:

jumolan nuoli inimizi

nouli sekä n[u]oli omo bou

jumola soud'nii okovy

In modern Finnish, this means roughly the following:

Jumalan nuoli, ihmisen

nuoli sekä nuoli oma.

Tuomion jumalan kahlittavaksi.

In modern Estonian, this means roughly the following:

Jumala nool, inimese

nool ja nool omaenda.

Kohtujumala aheldatuks.

In English, this means roughly the following:

God's arrow, man's
arrow, and (his) own arrow. [

To be chained by the Doom-God.]

=== By Yevgeny Khelimsky ===
Professor Yevgeny Khelimsky in his 1986 work criticizes Haavio's interpretation and gives the third known scientific interpretation, believing the letter to be an invocation, like Yeliseyev:

Jumalan nuoli 10 nimezi

Nuoli säihä nuoli ambu

Jumala suduni ohjavi (johavi?)

A translation into Finnish of this interpretation would look something like this:

Jumalan nuoli 10 nimesi

Nuoli säihkyvä nuoli ampuu

Suuto-Jumala (Syyttö-Jumala)† ohjaa (johtaa?)

In English, it means roughly the following:

God's arrow, ten your name(s)
Arrow sparkling, arrow shoots

The Doom-God guides/directs (leads/rules?)

†Syyttö-Jumala could also mean "Blaming God" or "God that blames"; modern Finnish syyttää = to blame or prosecute.

== See also ==
- Käymäjärvi inscriptions

== Sources ==
- Bakró-Nagy, Marianne; Laakso, Johanna; Skribnik, Elena (2022). The Oxford Guide to the Uralic Languages. Oxford University Press. ISBN 978-0-19-876766-4.
- Jelisejev, J. S. Vanhin itämerensuomalainen kielenmuistomerkki, Virittäjä-lehti, 1961: 134
- Jelisejev, J. S. Itämerensuomalaisia kielenmuistomerkkejä (Zusammenfassung: Ostseefinnische Sprachdenkmäler), Virittäjä-lehti 1966: 296
- Martti Haavio The Letter on Birch-Bark No. 292, Journal of the Folklore Institute, 1964. JSTOR 3814030
- Haavio, Martti, Tuohikirje n:o 292. Vanha suomalaisen muinaisuskonnon lähde, Virittäjä-lehti 1964: 1
