= Jean Baptiste Aimable Gaillot =

French astronomer (1834–1921)

Jean Baptiste Aimable Gaillot, known as Aimable Gaillot (French: [ɛmabl ɡajo]; 27 April 1834 – 4 June 1921), was an astronomer at the Observatoire de Paris from 1861 to 1903.

He was born to Jean Baptiste Gaillot and Marie Catherine Gillet on 27 April 1834 in Saint-Jean-sur-Tourbe, Marne, France. He was recruited by Urbain Le Verrier in 1861 and spent his entire career at the Bureau of Computation. He is known for his completion of Le Verrier's analytic theories of the motion of Jupiter, Saturn, Uranus and Neptune, and for the publication of the Catalogue de l’Observatoire de Paris, an enormous compilation of transit observations from 1837 to 1881. The French Academy of Sciences awarded him the Prix Damoiseau for 1902. He died 4 June 1921 in Chartres, France.
