= Bianchini (lunar crater) =

Crater on the Moon

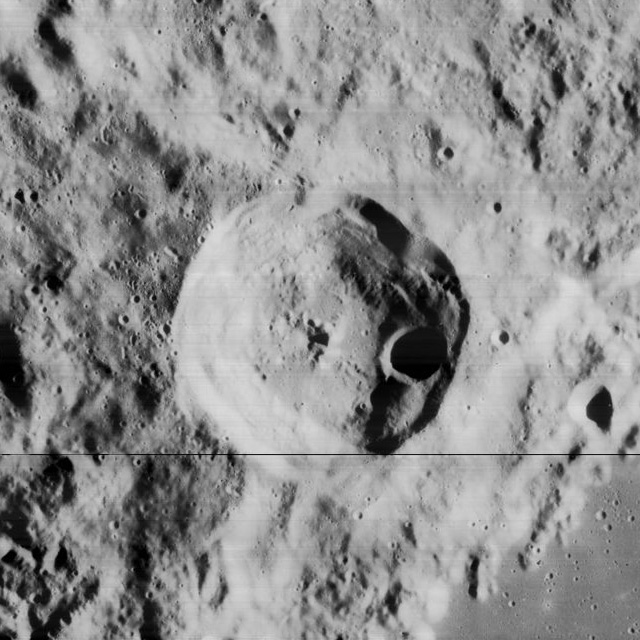
- Lunar Orbiter 4 image
- Coordinates: 48.7°N 34.3°W
- Diameter: 37.59 km (23.36 mi)
- Depth: 3.1 km (1.9 mi)
- Colongitude: 34° at sunrise
- Formation: Late Imbrian
- Eponym: Francesco Bianchini

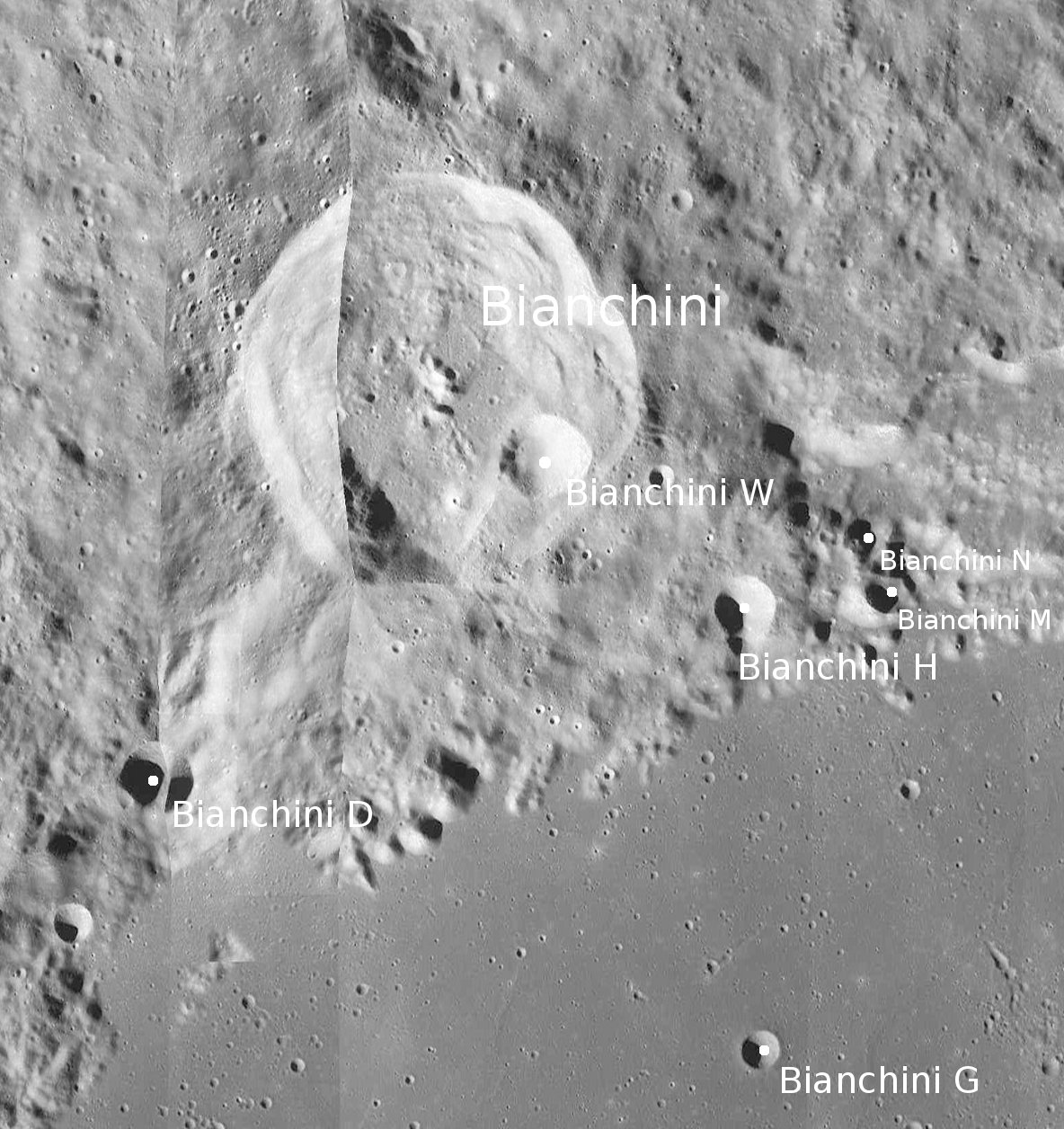
Satellite craters of Bianchini

Bianchini is a lunar impact crater that lies along the northern Jura Mountains that ring the Sinus Iridum, in the northwestern part of the near side of the Moon. The impact of this crater near the edge of the Jura Mountains deposited some material into the Sinus Iridum floor.

On the lunar geologic timescale, Bianchini dates to the Upper (Late) Imbrian age. The polygonal rim of this crater is not significantly worn, although there is a small crater along the inner side of the eastern rim. Within the inner wall is a somewhat irregular floor and a small cluster of ridges at the midpoint. Portions of the inner wall have slumped toward the floor along the northern edges.

This crater was named after Italian astronomer Francesco Bianchini (1662-1729). The name was incorporated into lunar nomenclature by the Italian astronomer Giovanni Riccioli in 1651 as 'Bianchinus'. Its modern designation was formally adopted by the International Astronomical Union in 1935.

== Satellite craters ==
By convention these features are identified on lunar maps by placing the letter on the side of the crater midpoint that is closest to Bianchini.

Bianchini	Latitude	Longitude	Diameter
D	47.6° N	35.8° W	7 km
G	46.7° N	32.7° W	4 km
H	48.0° N	32.7° W	7 km
M	48.4° N	30.6° W	4 km
N	48.5° N	31.0° W	5 km
W	48.5° N	33.7° W	9 km
