= Golden Handle =

Visual effect on the Moon

The Golden Handle, also known as the Jeweled Handle, is a visual effect at the lunar terminator. About 10 to 11 days after new moon the valley of the rainbow bay (Sinus Iridum) is still in shadow, while the mountain peaks of the adjacent Montes Jura are already reached by sunlight due to their height of up to 2700 meters. Because of its concise shape, reminiscent of a handle, and the yellowish light reflected from the Moon, this formation received the name "Golden Handle". The Golden Handle is visible once within a month for several hours. It can be observed with binoculars and can be taken by cameras with telephoto lenses.

== Gallery ==
Golden Handle

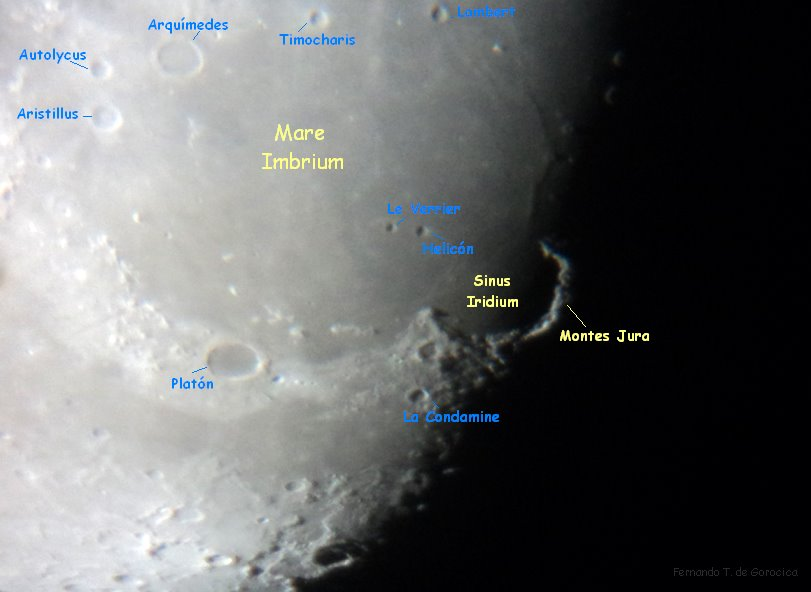
April 2012

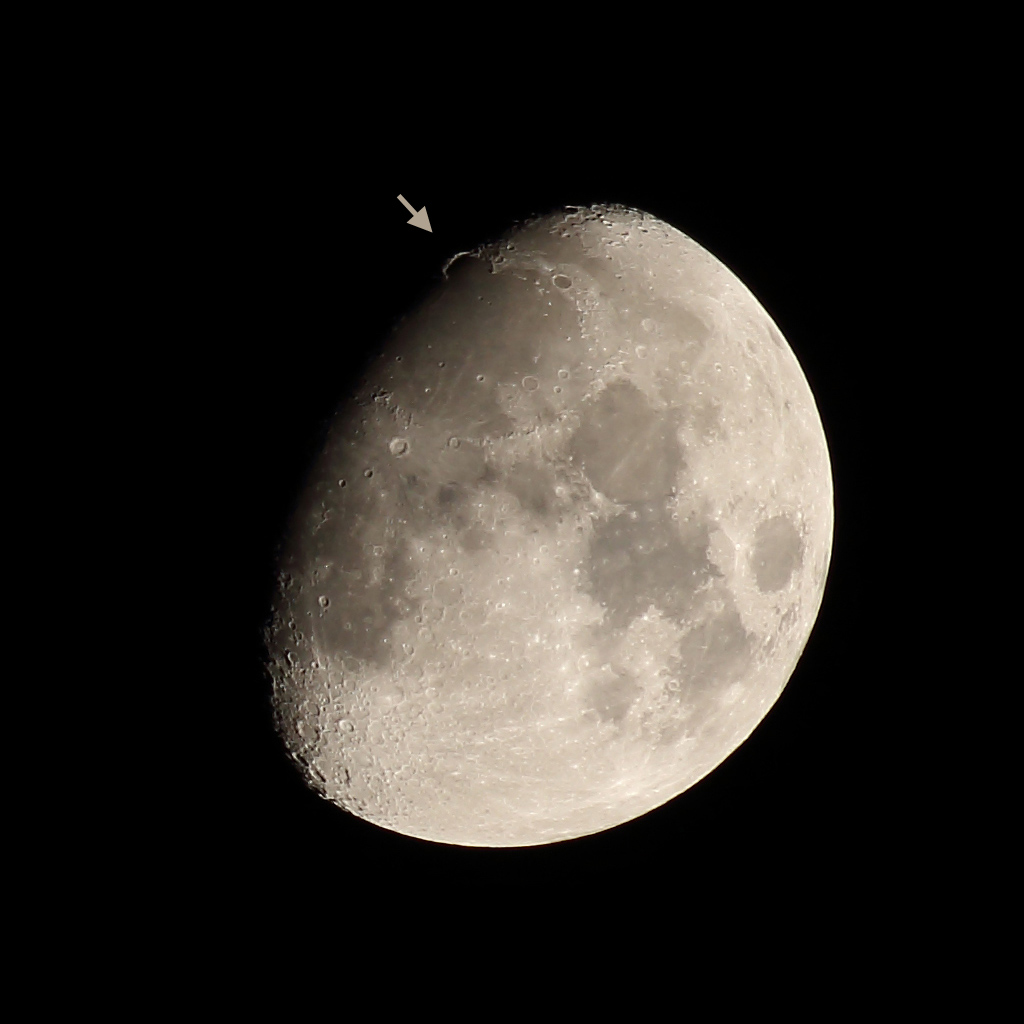
February 2017

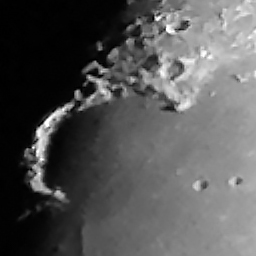
June 2022

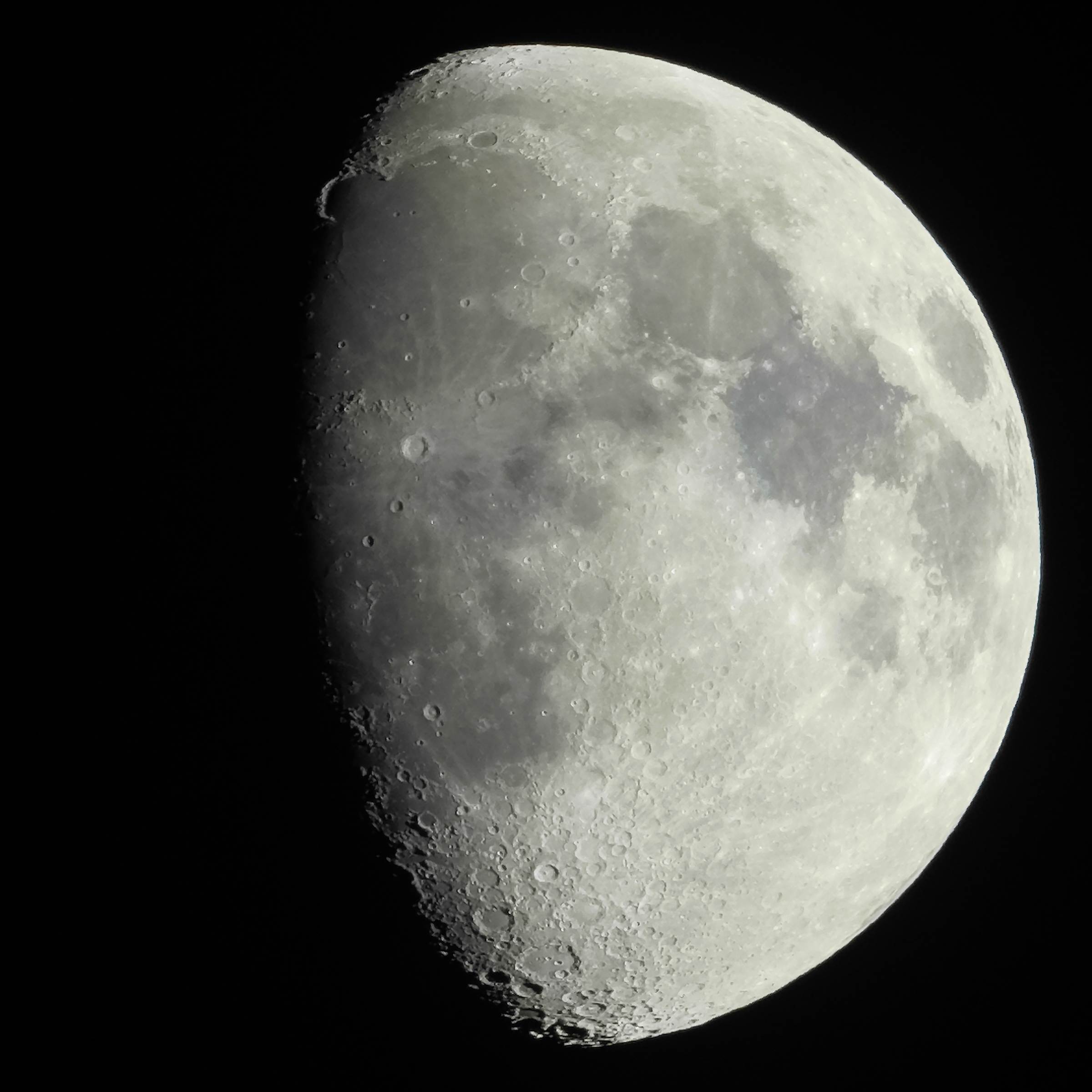
June 2022

== See also ==
- Rupes Recta – Linear fault on the Moon
