= Pierre Bouguer =

French mathematician, physicist, and astronomer (1698–1758)

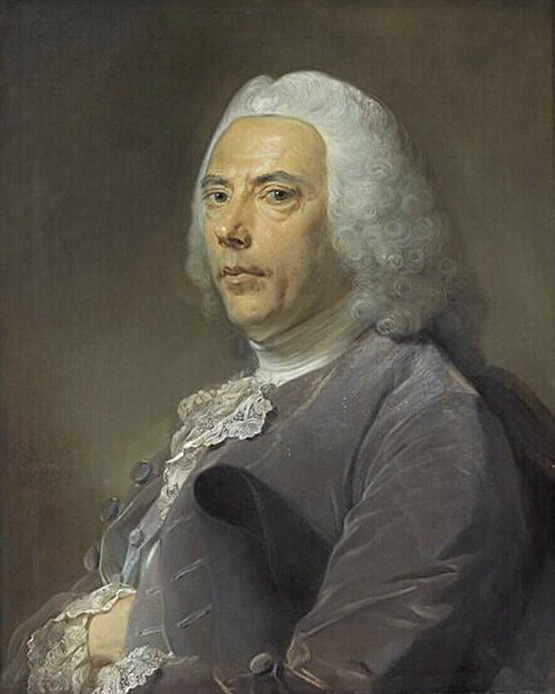
- Portrait by Jean-Baptiste Perronneau, 1753, in the collection of the Louvre

Signature
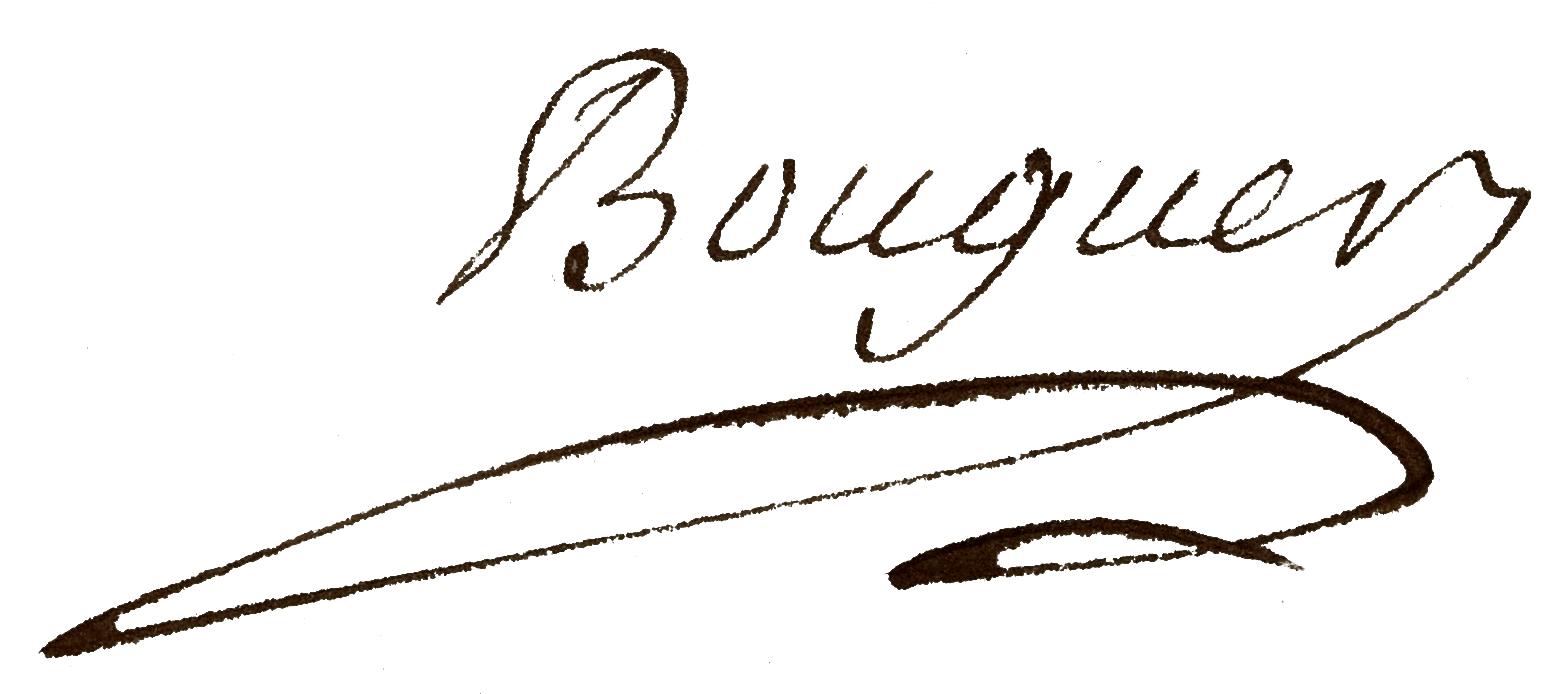

Pierre Bouguer (French: [buˈge]) (16 February 1698, Le Croisic, Province of Brittany – 15 August 1758, Paris) was a French mathematician, geophysicist, geodesist, and astronomer. He is also known as "the father of naval architecture". In optics, he is known for making the first numerical photometric measurement.

== Career ==
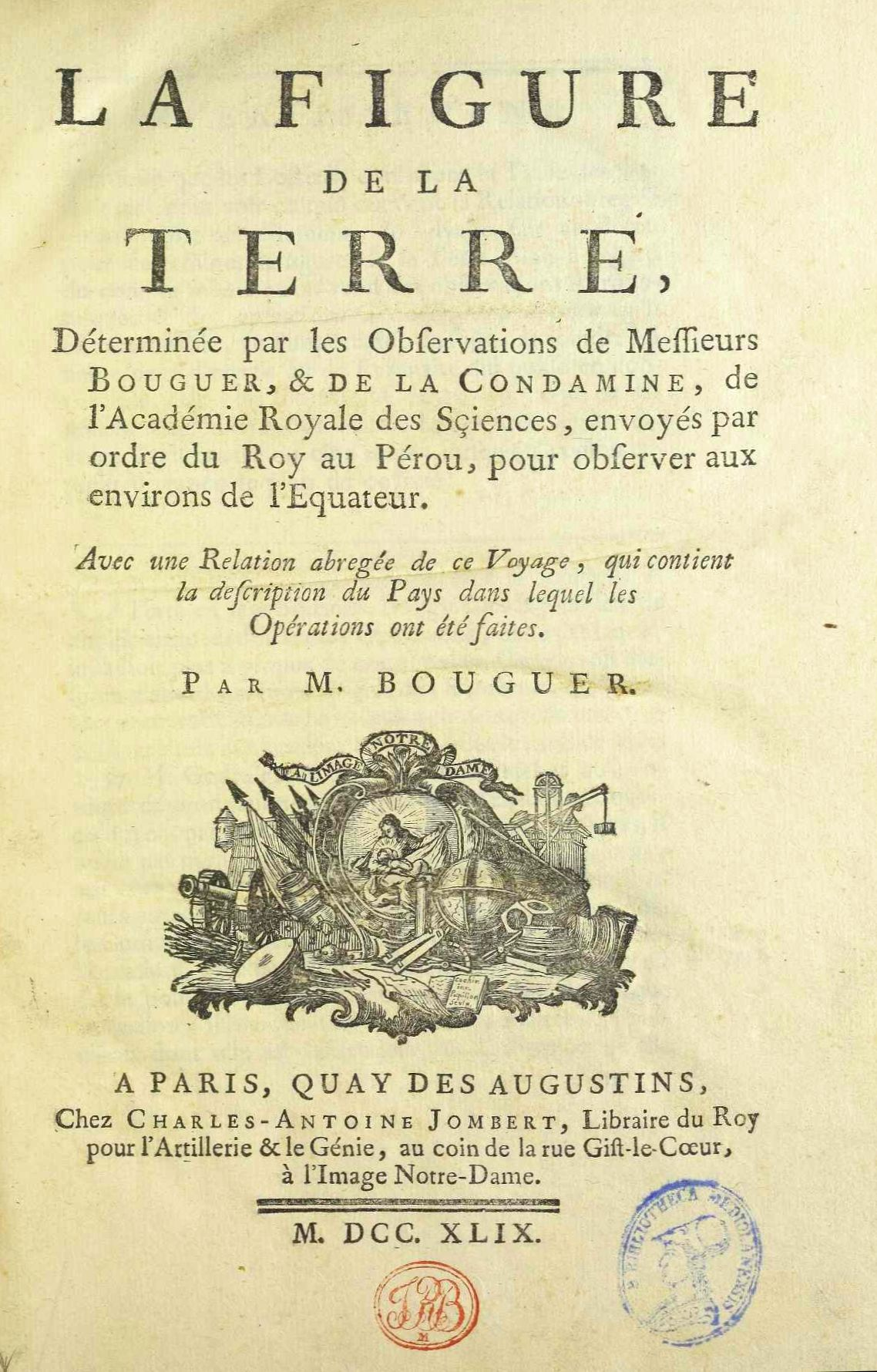
La Figure de la terre, 1749

Bouguer's father, Jean Bouguer, one of the best hydrographers of his time, was Regius Professor of hydrography at Le Croisic in lower Brittany, and author of a treatise on navigation. He taught his sons Pierre and Jan at their home, where he also taught private students. In 1714, at the age of 16, Pierre was appointed to succeed his deceased father as professor of hydrography. In 1727 he gained the prize given by the French Academy of Sciences for his paper On the masting of ships, beating Leonhard Euler; and two other prizes, one for his dissertation On the best method of observing the altitude of stars at sea, the other for his paper On the best method of observing the variation of the compass at sea. These were published in the Prix de l'Académie des Sciences.

In 1729, Bouguer published Essai d'optique sur la gradation de la lumière, the object of which is to define the quantity of light lost by passing through a given extent of the atmosphere, and became the first known discoverer of what is now more commonly known as the Beer-Lambert law. He found the light of the sun to be 300,000 times more intense than that of the moon, and thus made some of the earliest measurements in photometry. In 1730 he was made professor of hydrography at Le Havre, and succeeded Pierre Louis Maupertuis as associate geometer of the Academy of Sciences. He also invented a heliometer, afterwards perfected by Joseph von Fraunhofer. He was afterwards promoted in the Academy to the place of Maupertuis, and went to reside in Paris.

Bouguer's Mémoire presented to the Academy of Sciences in 1734 and published in 1736 was the first treatise on the theory of dome.

In 1735, Bouguer, conducting an arc-measuring scientific mission to the Viceroyalty of Peru, more specifically to the Royal Audience of Quito (today's Ecuador) with Charles Marie de La Condamine among others, sailed to measure the length of a degree of latitude in the meridian arc near the equator. The operation took ten years. In 1749, Bouguer published a full account of it titled La figure de la terre (lit. 'The figure of the earth'). During his measurements, he observed considerably smaller deflections of the vertical than expected from the presence of the Andes Mountains, challenging the prevailing assumption of seeing the crust as a "constant and uniform layer", and—combined with George Everest's 19th-century observations of the Himalayas—these findings resulted in "the notion of isostasy [being] created and introduced."

In 1746 he published the first treatise of naval architecture, Traité du navire, which among other achievements first explained the use of the metacenter as a measure of ships' stability. His later writings were nearly all upon the theory of navigation and naval architecture.

In January 1750 he was elected a Fellow of the Royal Society.

== Works ==
- Traité d'optique sur la gradation de la lumière [lat] (in Latin). Wien: Trattner.
- Essai d'optique, sur la gradation de la lumière (in French). Paris: Claude Jombert. 1729.
- Figure de la terre (in French). Paris: Charles Antoine Jombert. 1749.

== Recognition ==
A crater on Mars was named in his honour. A lunar crater and an asteroid were also named after him.

His name is also recalled as the meteorological term Bouguer's halo (also known as Ulloa's halo, after Antonio de Ulloa, a Spanish member of his South American expedition) which an observer may see infrequently in fog when sun breaks through (for example, on a mountain) and looks down-sun – effectively a "fog bow" (as opposed to a "rain-bow"). It is "An infrequently observed meteorological phenomenon; a faint white, circular arc or complete ring of light that has a radius of 39 degrees and is centred on the antisolar point. When observed, it is usually in the form of a separate outer ring around an anticorona."

The term Bouguer anomaly, referring to small regional variations in the Earth's gravity field resulting from density variations in underlying rocks, is named after him.

A large bronze statue of him stands at the port in Le Croisic; see Works by Jean Fréour.

== See also ==
- Isostasy
- List of geophysicists
- Radiodrome
- Schiehallion experiment
