= 3281 Maupertuis =

Main-belt asteroid

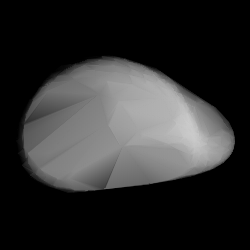
- Shape model of Maupertuis from its lightcurve

Discovery
- Discovered by: Y. Väisälä
- Discovery site: Turku Obs.
- Discovery date: 24 February 1938

Designations
- Named after: Pierre Louis Maupertuis (French mathematician)
- Alternative designations: 1938 DZ · 1961 TP; 1970 AP · 1979 TV
- Minor planet category: main-belt · (inner); Vesta · Flora

Orbital characteristics
- Epoch 23 March 2018 (JD 2458200.5)
- Uncertainty parameter 0
- Observation arc: 86.03 yr (31,422 d)
- Aphelion: 2.5798 AU
- Perihelion: 2.1203 AU
- Semi-major axis: 2.3501 AU
- Eccentricity: 0.0978
- Orbital period (sidereal): 3.60 yr (1,316 d)
- Mean anomaly: 20.991°
- Mean motion: 0° 16^{m} 24.96^{s} / day
- Inclination: 5.9904°
- Longitude of ascending node: 348.46°
- Argument of perihelion: 240.52°

Physical characteristics
- Mean diameter: 5.482±0.043 km 5.680±0.031 km 7.14 km (calculated)
- Synodic rotation period: 6.7295±0.0001 h (Note: Polar luster diagram of (3281) Maupertuis (diagramme polaire de l'éclat). Summary figures for at the Asteroids and comets rotation curves, CdR, Raoul Behrend, Geneva Observatory.); 6.72984±0.00001 h
- Geometric albedo: 0.24 (assumed); 0.4611±0.0450; 0.489±0.020
- Spectral type: S (assumed); V (possibly)
- Absolute magnitude (H): 12.7; 12.9; 13.11±0.45

3281 Maupertuis (prov. designation: 1938 DZ) is a bright Vesta asteroid from the inner regions of the asteroid belt. It was discovered on 24 February 1938, by Finnish astronomer Yrjö Väisälä at the Turku Observatory in southwest Finland. The likely elongated V-type asteroid has a rotation period of 6.7 hours and measures approximately 5.5 kilometers (3.4 miles) in diameter. It was named after French geodesist and mathematician Pierre Louis Maupertuis.

== Orbit and classification ==
Maupertuis is a member of the Vesta family (401), a giant asteroid family of typically bright V-type asteroids. Vestian asteroids have a composition akin to cumulate eucrites (HED meteorites) and are thought to have originated deep within 4 Vesta's crust, possibly from the Rheasilvia crater, a large impact crater on its southern hemisphere near the South pole, formed as a result of a sub-catastrophic collision. Vesta is the main belt's second-largest and second-most-massive body after Ceres. Based on osculating Keplerian orbital elements, the asteroid has also been classified as a member of the Flora family (402), a giant asteroid family and the largest family of stony asteroids in the main-belt.

It orbits the Sun in the inner asteroid belt at a distance of 2.1–2.6 AU once every 3 years and 7 months (1,316 days; semi-major axis of 2.35 AU). Its orbit has an eccentricity of 0.10 and an inclination of 6° with respect to the ecliptic. The body's observation arc begins with a precovery taken at the Lowell Observatory in March 1931, or nearly 7 years prior to its official discovery observation at Turku.

== Naming ==
This minor planet was named after French geodesist and mathematician Pierre Louis Maupertuis (1698–1759), who was a member of the French Academy of Sciences and chief of the French Geodesic Mission to the Tornio river valley in Lapland, Finland, to conducted the degree measurement of the meridian (1736–1737), which determined that the Earth is oblate rather than prolate (see spheroid), as proposed by his rival Jacques Cassini. The naming was published by the Minor Planet Center on 27 June 1991 (M.P.C. 18451). The lunar crater Maupertuis was also named in his honor.

== Physical characteristics ==
Maupertuis is an assumed stony S-type asteroid. Based on its high albedo (see below), and its membership to the Vesta family, it is possibly a V-type asteroid.

=== Rotation period and poles ===
In March 2010, a rotational lightcurve of Maupertuis was obtained from photometric observations by French amateur astronomer René Roy. Lightcurve analysis gave a well-defined rotation period of 6.7295 hours with an exceptionally high brightness amplitude of 1.22 magnitude (U=3), indicative of a strongly elongated shape.

In March 2016, a second period was published based on data from the Lowell Photometric Database. Using lightcurve inversion and convex shape models, as well as distributed computing power and the help of individual volunteers, a sidereal period of 6.25033±0.00001 hours was derived from the database's sparse-in-time photometry data. Two spin axes at (62.0°, −66.0°) and (231.0°, −74.0°) in ecliptic coordinates (λ, β) were also determined.

=== Diameter and albedo ===
According to the survey carried out by the NEOWISE mission of NASA's Wide-field Infrared Survey Explorer, Maupertuis measures between 5.482 and 5.680 kilometers in diameter and its surface has an albedo between 0.4611 and 0.489. The Collaborative Asteroid Lightcurve Link assumes it to be a Florian asteroid and uses a lower albedo of 0.24 – derived from 8 Flora, the family's parent body – and consequently calculates a somewhat larger diameter of 7.14 kilometers based on an absolute magnitude of 12.9.
