= Le Verrier (lunar crater) =

Crater on the Moon

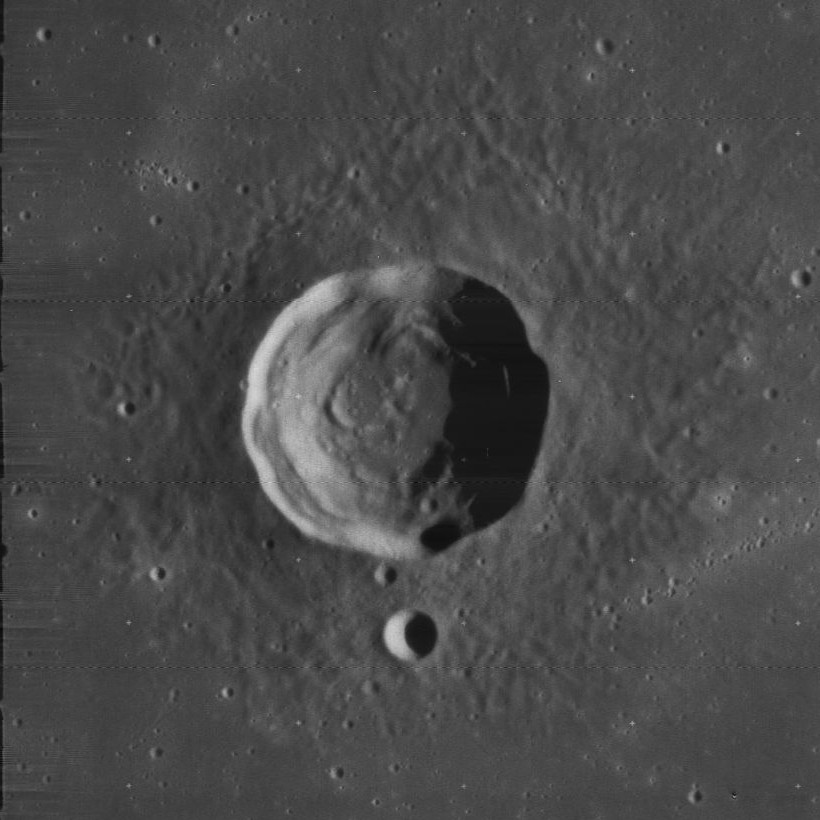
- Le Verrier seen by Lunar Orbiter 4 in 1967
- Coordinates: 40.3°N 20.6°W
- Diameter: 20 km
- Depth: 2.1 km
- Colongitude: 21° at sunrise
- Formation: Eratosthenian
- Eponym: Urbain Le Verrier

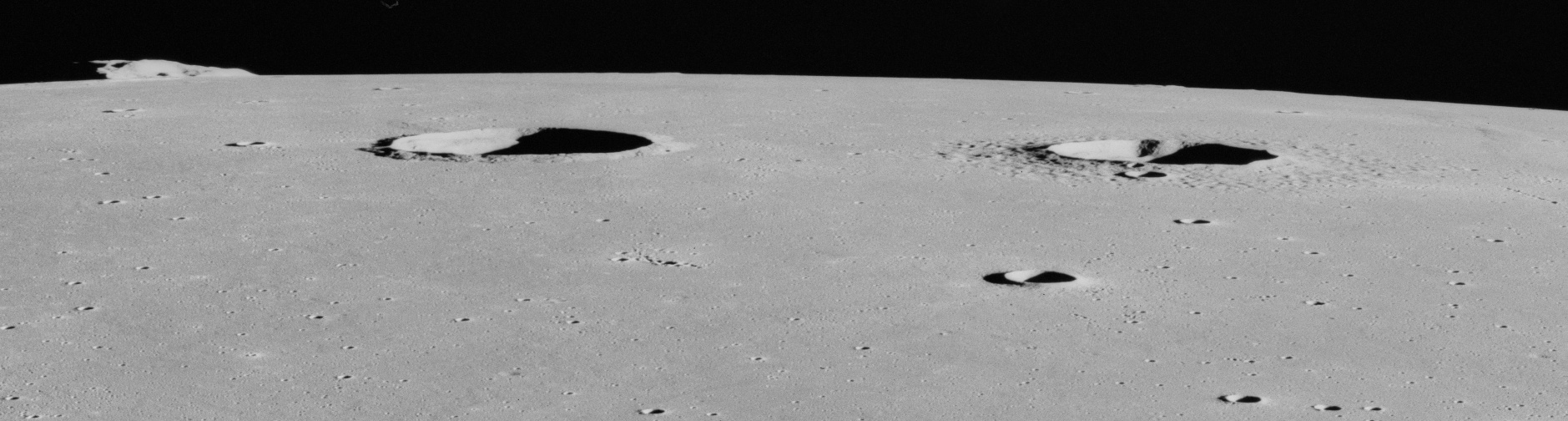
View of Helicon (left) and Le Verrier (right). While Helicon's ejecta is buried by the mare lava, Le Verrier's is not. (The mountain on the horizon at left is Promontorium Laplace. Image taken by Apollo 15).

Le Verrier is a small lunar impact crater located in the northern part of the Mare Imbrium. It was named after French mathematician and astronomer Urbain Le Verrier. To the west is the slightly larger crater Helicon, and farther to the west-northwest lies the mountain-ringed bay Sinus Iridum.

Le Verrier, sometimes written Leverrier, is a bowl-shaped feature with a nearly circular rim. The inner walls display the appearance of slumping along the upper edges. The inner wall and floor to the southeast appears more irregular than elsewhere.

Chang'e 3 landed north of Le Verrier in December 2013.

== Satellite craters ==
By convention these features are identified on lunar maps by placing the letter on the side of the crater midpoint that is closest to Le Verrier.

Le Verrier	Latitude	Longitude	Diameter
A	38.1° N	17.3° W	4 km
B	40.1° N	12.9° W	5 km
D	39.7° N	12.3° W	9 km
E	42.4° N	16.9° W	7 km
S	38.9° N	20.6° W	3 km
T	39.8° N	20.7° W	4 km
U	37.2° N	13.1° W	4 km
V	37.8° N	14.2° W	3 km
W	39.4° N	13.9° W	3 km
X	41.6° N	12.1° W	3 km
