= 1877 Marsden =

Carbonaceous Hilda asteroid

Discovery
- Discovered by: C. J. van Houten; I. van Houten-G. T. Gehrels
- Discovery site: Palomar Obs.
- Discovery date: 24 March 1971

Designations
- Named after: Brian G. Marsden (British astronomer)
- Alternative designations: 1971 FC · 1950 TG; 1950 TT_{2}
- Minor planet category: main-belt · Hilda

Orbital characteristics
- Epoch 4 September 2017 (JD 2458000.5)
- Uncertainty parameter 0
- Observation arc: 66.57 yr (24,315 days)
- Aphelion: 4.7626 AU
- Perihelion: 3.1251 AU
- Semi-major axis: 3.9439 AU
- Eccentricity: 0.2076
- Orbital period (sidereal): 7.83 yr (2,861 days)
- Mean anomaly: 244.81°
- Inclination: 17.551°
- Longitude of ascending node: 352.86°
- Argument of perihelion: 306.87°
- T_{Jupiter}: 2.9430

Physical characteristics
- Dimensions: 34.01 km (derived); 35.27±1.78 km 35.643±0.298 km
- Synodic rotation period: 14.4 h
- Geometric albedo: 0.057 (assumed); 0.07±0.01; 0.082±0.009
- Spectral type: D · C
- Absolute magnitude (H): 10.70 · 10.9 · 11.07

1877 Marsden, provisional designation 1971 FC, is a carbonaceous Hildian asteroid from the outermost region of the asteroid belt, approximately 35 kilometers in diameter. It was discovered during the Palomar–Leiden Trojan survey in 1971, and named after British astronomer Brian Marsden.

== Discovery ==
Marsden was discovered on 24 March 1971, by Dutch astronomer couple Ingrid and Cornelis van Houten at Leiden, on photographic plates taken by Dutch–American astronomer Tom Gehrels at Palomar Observatory, California.

The discovery was made in a survey of faint Trojans (in spite of not having received a typical T-1 designation). The trio of Dutch and Dutch–American astronomers collaborated on the productive Palomar–Leiden survey in the 1960s, using the same procedure as for this smaller Trojan campaign: Gehrels used Palomar's Samuel Oschin telescope (also known as the 48-inch Schmidt Telescope), and shipped the photographic plates to Cornelis and Ingrid van Houten at Leiden Observatory where blinking and astrometry was carried out.

== Orbit and classification ==
Marsden is a member of the Hilda family. It orbits the Sun in the outermost main-belt at a distance of 3.1–4.8 AU once every 7 years and 10 months (2,861 days). Its orbit has an eccentricity of 0.21 and an inclination of 18° with respect to the ecliptic.

== Physical characteristics ==
This asteroid has been characterized as a dark C-type and D-type asteroid.

=== Rotation period ===
During a photometric survey of Hilda asteroids in the late 1990s, an obtained light curve for Marsden gave a rotation period of 14.4 hours with a brightness variation of 0.22 in magnitude (U=2).

=== Diameter and albedo ===
According to the surveys carried out by the Japanese Akari satellite and NASA's Wide-field Infrared Survey Explorer with its subsequent NEOWISE mission, Marsden measures 35.27 and 35.643 kilometers in diameter and its surface has an albedo of 0.082 and 0.07, respectively. The Collaborative Asteroid Lightcurve Link assumes a standard albedo for carbonaceous asteroids of 0.057 and derives a diameter of 34.01 kilometers with an absolute magnitude of 11.07.

== Naming ==
This minor planet was named in honor of British astronomer Brian Marsden (1937–2010), director of the Minor Planet Center (MPC) at the Harvard–Smithsonian Center for Astrophysics, in recognition of his numerous contributions in the field of orbit calculations for comets and minor planets. The official naming citation was published by the Minor Planet Center on 1 June 1975 (M.P.C. 3826).
