= Promontorium Laplace =

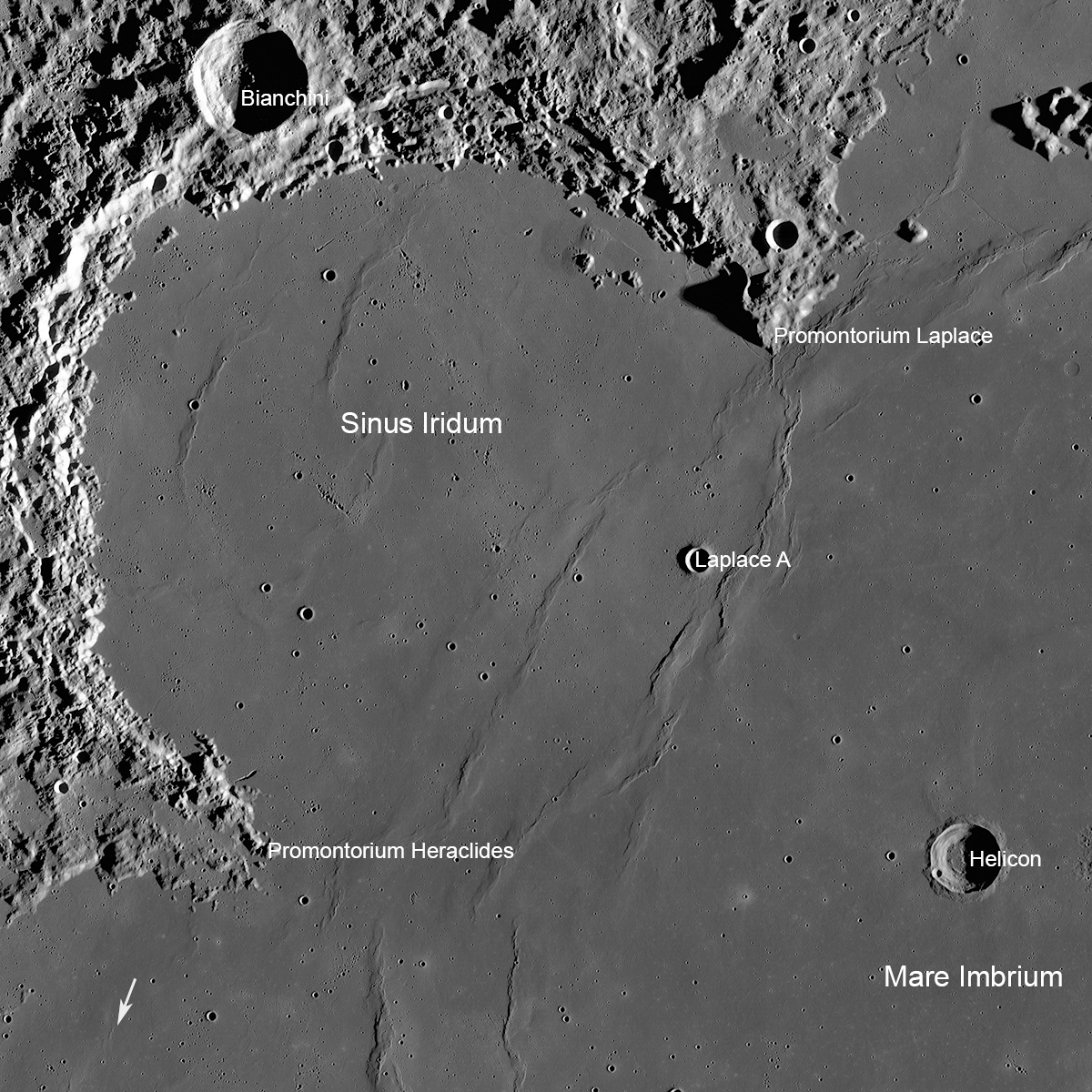
Annotated Sinus Iridum by LRO; Promontorium Laplace is labeled at upper-right.

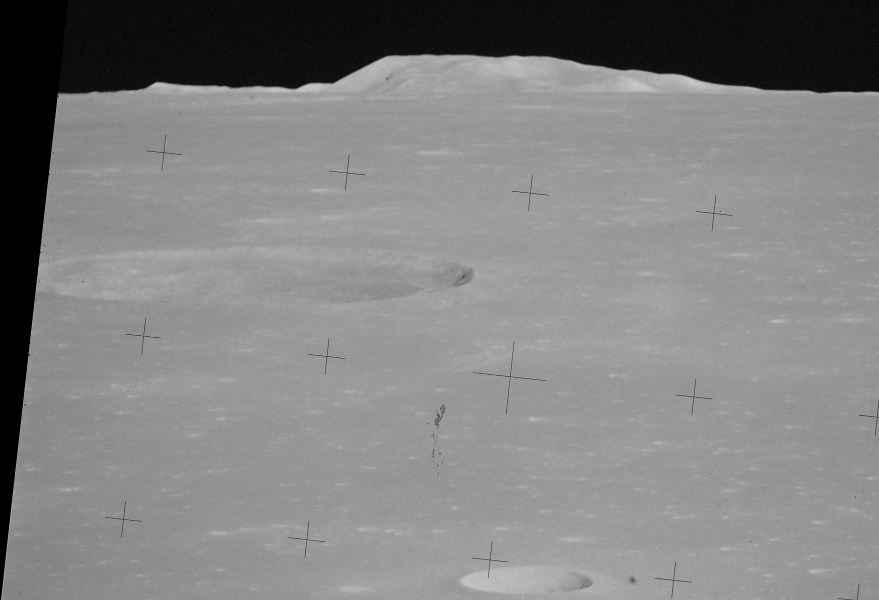
Oblique view of Helicon crater (left), with Promontorium Laplace on horizon, from Apollo 15.

Promontorium Laplace is a raised mountainous cape situated at the end of Montes Jura in Mare Imbrium on the near side of the Moon. Its selenographic coordinates are 46.8° N, 25.5° W and it is 2,600 meters high. It forms the northeast boundary of the bay of Sinus Iridum. It is named after Pierre Simon marquis de Laplace, an 18th-century French astronomer, mathematician, and physicist.
