= Pierre Louis Maupertuis =

French mathematician, philosopher and man of letters (1698–1759)

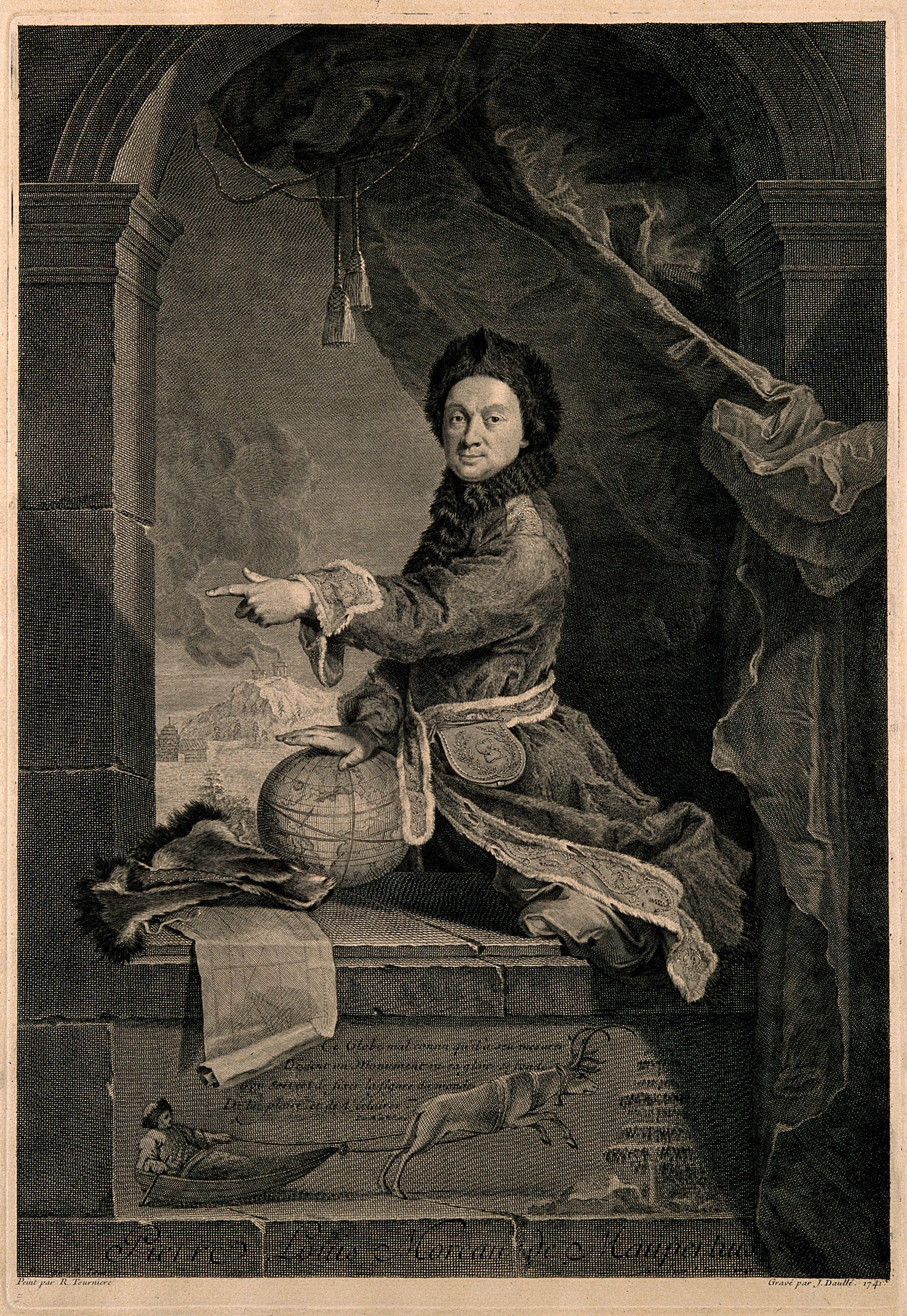
- Maupertuis, wearing "lapmudes" from his Lapland expedition. With one hand he is pressing on the globe, making it oblate. Line engraving by J. Daullé, 1741, after R. Levrac-Tournières, 1737.
- Born: 1698; Saint-Malo, Province of Brittany, France
- Died: 27 July 1759 (aged 60); Basel, Switzerland
- Known for: Maupertuis's principle Principle of least action Precursor of transmutation
- Scientific career
- Fields: Mathematics, physics, biology, metaphysics, moral philosophy, astronomy, geography
- Workplaces: French Academy, Berlin Academy

Pierre Louis Moreau de Maupertuis (/ˌmoʊpɛərˈtwiː/; French: [mopɛʁtɥi]; 1698 – 27 July 1759) (Note: In the city archives of Saint-Malo his baptism date is given as 28 September 1698. The actual birth date is unknown.) was a French mathematician, philosopher and man of letters. He became the director of the Académie des Sciences and the first president of the Prussian Academy of Science, at the invitation of Frederick the Great.

Maupertuis made an expedition to Lapland to determine the shape of the Earth. He is often credited with having discovered the principle of least action – a version of which is known as Maupertuis's principle – which he expressed as an integral equation that describes the path followed by a physical system. His work in natural history is interesting in relation to modern science since he touched on aspects of heredity and the struggle for life.

== Biography ==
Maupertuis was born at Saint-Malo, France, to a moderately wealthy family of merchant-corsairs. His father, Renė, had been involved in a number of enterprises that were central to the monarchy so that he thrived socially and politically. The son was educated in mathematics by a private tutor, Nicolas Guisnée, and upon completing his formal education his father secured him a largely honorific cavalry commission. After three years in the cavalry, during which time he became acquainted with fashionable social and mathematical circles, he moved to Paris and began building his reputation as a mathematician and literary wit. In 1723 he was admitted to the Académie des Sciences.

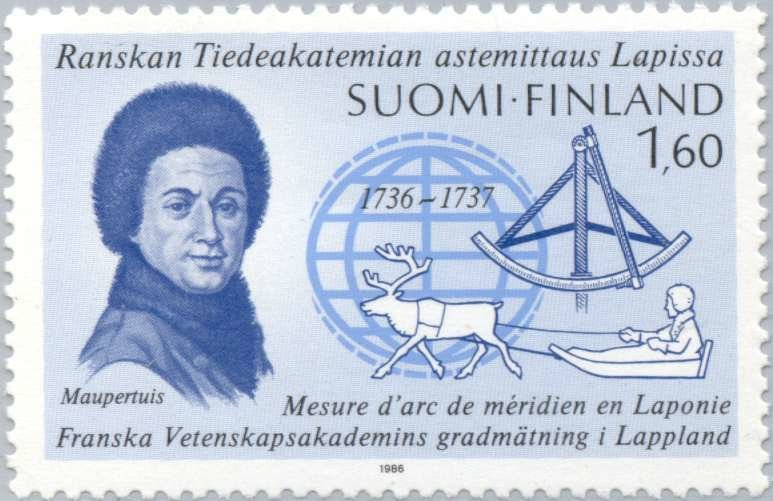
Commemorating stamp of the French Geodesic Mission to Lapland.

His early mathematical work revolved around the vis viva controversy, for which Maupertuis developed and extended the work of Isaac Newton (whose theories were not yet widely accepted outside England) and argued against the waning Cartesian mechanics. In the 1730s, the shape of the Earth became a flashpoint in the battle among rival systems of mechanics. Maupertuis, based on his exposition of Newton (with the help of his mentor Johann Bernoulli) predicted that the Earth should be oblate, while his rival Jacques Cassini measured it astronomically to be prolate. In 1736 Maupertuis acted as chief of the French Geodesic Mission sent by King Louis XV to Lapland to measure the length of a degree of arc of the meridian. His results, which he published in a book detailing his procedures, essentially settled the controversy in his favour. The book included an adventure narrative of the expedition, and an account of the Käymäjärvi Inscriptions in Sweden. On his return home he became a member of almost all the scientific societies of Europe.

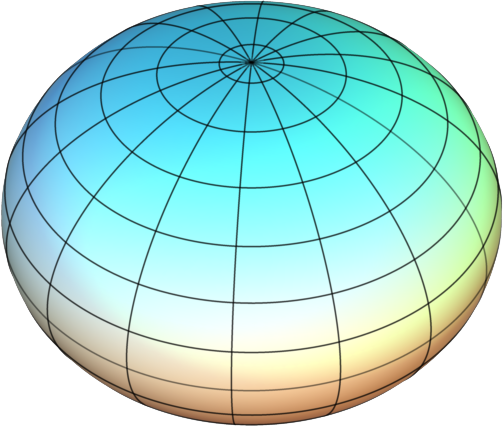
Maupertuis's opinion

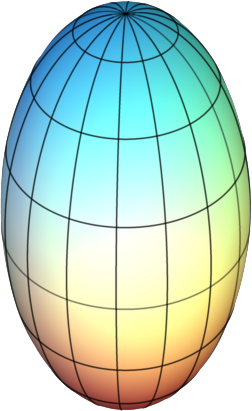
Cassini's opinion

After the Lapland expedition, Maupertuis set about generalising his earlier mathematical work, proposing the principle of least action as a metaphysical principle that underlies all the laws of mechanics. He also expanded into the biological realm, anonymously publishing a book that was part popular science, part philosophy, and part erotica: Vénus physique. In that work, Maupertuis proposed a theory of generation (i.e., reproduction) in which organic matter possessed a self-organizing “intelligence” that was analogous to the contemporary chemical concept of affinities, which was widely read and commented upon favourably by Georges-Louis Leclerc, Comte de Buffon. He later developed his views on living things further in a more formal pseudonymous work that explored heredity, collecting evidence that confirmed the contributions of both sexes and treated variations as statistical phenomena.

In 1740 Maupertuis went to Berlin at the invitation of Frederick II of Prussia, and took part in the Battle of Mollwitz, where he was taken prisoner by the Austrians. On his release he returned to Berlin, and thence to Paris, where he was elected director of the Academy of Sciences in 1742, and in the following year was admitted into the Académie française. Returning to Berlin in 1744, again at the desire of Frederick II, he was chosen president of the Royal Prussian Academy of Sciences in 1746, which he controlled with the help of Leonhard Euler until his death. His position became extremely awkward with the outbreak of the Seven Years' War between his home country and his patron's, and his reputation suffered in both Paris and Berlin. Finding his health declining, he retired in 1757 to the south of France with a young girl, leaving his wife and children behind and went in 1758 to Basel, where he died a year later. Maupertuis's difficult disposition involved him in constant quarrels, of which his controversies with Samuel König and Voltaire during the latter part of his life are examples.

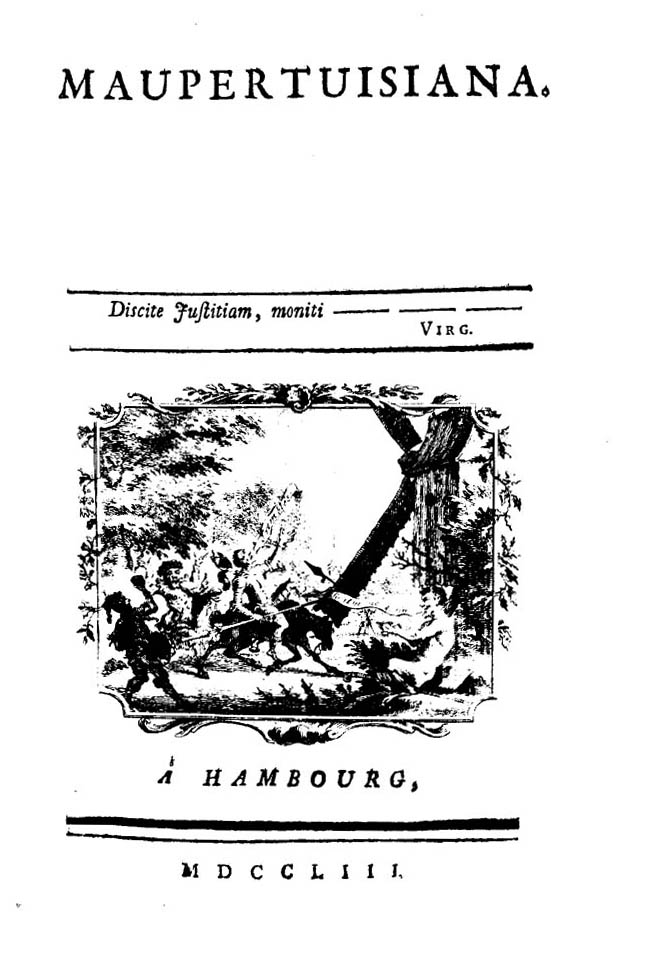
Maupertuisiana (1753), published anonymously by Voltaire or König. On the cover is represented Don Quixote (Maupertuis) attacking the windmills with the broken lance and exclaiming "Tremoleu!". Underneath there is Sancho Panza (Euler) riding a saddle, while to the right a satyr exclaims: "This is how you get to the stars!"

"The brilliance of much of what he did was undermined by his tendency to leave work unfinished, his failure to realise his own potential. It was the insight of genius that led him to least-action principle, but a lack of intellectual energy or rigour that prevented his giving it the mathematical foundation that Lagrange would provide... He reveals remarkable powers of perception in heredity, in understanding the mechanism by which species developed, even in immunology, but no fully elaborated theory. His philosophical work is his most enthralling: bold, exciting, well argued."

== Evolution ==
Some historians of science point to his work in biology as a significant precursor to the development of evolutionary theory, specifically the theory of natural selection. Other writers contend that his remarks are cursory, vague, or incidental to that particular argument. Mayr's verdict was "He was neither an evolutionist, nor one of the founders of the theory of natural selection [but] he was one of the pioneers of genetics".

Maupertuis espoused a theory of pangenesis, postulating particles from both mother and father as responsible for the characters of the child. Bowler credits him with studies on heredity, with the natural origin of human races, and with the idea that forms of life may have changed with time.

Maupertuis was a strong critic of the natural theologians, pointing to phenomena incompatible with a concept of a good and wise Creator. He was also one of the first to consider animals in terms of variable populations, in opposition to the natural history tradition that emphasised description of individual specimens.

The difficulty of interpreting Maupertuis can be gauged by reading the original works. Below is a translation from the Essai de cosmologie, followed by the original French passage:

But could one not say that, in the fortuitous combinations of the productions of nature, as there were but some where certain relations of fitness (Note: "Fitness" (convenance): not to be read as having the precision of the modern technical term fitness in population genetics.) were present which be able to subsist, it is not to be wondered at that this fitness is present in all the species that are currently in existence? Chance, it may be said, had produced an innumerable multitude of individuals; a small number found themselves constructed in such a manner that the parts of the animal were able to satisfy its needs; in another infinitely greater number, there was neither fitness nor order: all of these latter have perished. Animals lacking a mouth could not live; others lacking reproductive organs could not perpetuate themselves; the only ones that remained are those in which order and fitness were found; and these species, which we see today, are but the smallest part of what blind destiny had produced.

Mais ne pourroit-on pas dire, que dans la combinaison fortuite des productions de la Nature, comme il n'y avoit que celles où se trouvoient certains rapports de convenance, qui pussent subsister, il n'est pas merveilleux que cette convenance se trouve dans toutes les especes qui actuellement existent? Le hasard, diroit-on, avoit produit une multitude innombrable d'Individus; un petit nombre se trouvoit construit de maniere que les parties de l'Animal pouvoient satisfaire à ses besoins; dans un autre infiniment plus grand, il n'y avoit ni convenance, ni ordre: tous ces derniers ont péri; des Animaux sans bouche ne pouvoient pas vivre, d'autres qui manquoient d'organes pour la génération ne pouvoient pas se perpétuer; les seuls qui soient restés, sont ceux où se trouvoient l'ordre & la convenance: & ces especes que nous voyons aujourd'hui, ne sont que la plus petite partie de ce qu'un destin aveugle avoit produit.

The same text was published earlier (1748) as "Les loix du mouvement et du repos déduites d'un principe metaphysique" (translation: "Derivation of the laws of motion and equilibrium from a metaphysical principle"). King-Hele (1963) points to similar, though not identical, ideas of thirty years later by David Hume in his Dialogues Concerning Natural Religion (1777).

The chief debate that Maupertuis was engaged in was one that treated the competing theories of generation (i.e. preformationism and epigenesis). His account of life involved spontaneous generation of new kinds of animals and plants, together with massive elimination of deficient forms. These ideas avoid the need for a Creator, but are not part of modern thinking on evolution. The date of these speculations, 1745, is concurrent with Carl Linnaeus's own work, and so predates any firm notion of species. Also, the work on genealogy, coupled with the tracing of phenotypic characters through lineages, foreshadows later work done in genetics.

== Least action principle ==
The principle of least action states that in all natural phenomena a quantity called 'action' tends to be minimised. Maupertuis developed such a principle over two decades. For him, action could be expressed mathematically as the product of the mass of the body involved, the distance it had travelled and the velocity at which it was travelling.

In 1741, he gave a paper to the Paris Academy of Sciences, Loi du repos des corps, (Law of bodies at rest). In it he showed that a system of bodies at rest tends to reach a position in which any change would create the smallest possible change in a quantity that he argued could be assimilated to action.

In 1744, in another paper to the Paris Academy, he gave his Accord de plusieurs lois naturelles qui avaient paru jusqu'ici incompatibles (Agreement of several natural laws that had hitherto seemed to be incompatible) to show that the behaviour of light during refraction – when it bends on entering a new medium – was such that the total path it followed, from a point in the first medium to a point in the second, minimised a quantity which he again assimilated to action.

Finally, in 1746 he gave a further paper, the Loix du mouvement et du repos (Laws of movement and rest), this time to the Berlin Academy of Sciences, which showed that point masses also minimise action. Point masses are bodies that can be treated for the purposes of analysis as being a certain amount of matter (a mass) concentrated at a single point. A major debate in the early part of the eighteenth century concerned the behaviour of such bodies in collisions.

Cartesian and Newtonian physicists argued that in their collisions, point masses conserved both momentum and relative velocity. Leibnizians, on the other hand, argued that they also conserved what was called live force or vis viva. This was unacceptable for their opponents for two reasons: the first that live force conservation did not apply to so-called ‘hard’ bodies, bodies that were totally incompressible, whereas the other two conservation principles did; the second was that live force was defined by the product of mass and square of velocity. Why did the velocity appear twice in this quantity, as squaring it suggests? The Leibnizians argued this was simple enough: there was a natural tendency in all matter towards motion, so even at rest, there is an inherent velocity in bodies; when they begin to move, there is a second velocity term corresponding to their actual motion.

This was anathema to Cartesians and Newtonians. An inherent tendency towards motion was an ‘occult quality’ of the kind of favoured by mediaeval scholastics and to be resisted at all costs.

Today the concept of a ‘hard’ body is rejected; and mass times the square of velocity is just twice kinetic energy so modern mechanics reserves a major role for the inheritor quantity of ‘live force’.

For Maupertuis, however, it was important to retain the concept of the hard body. And the beauty of his principle of least action was that it applied just as well to hard and elastic bodies. Since he had shown that the principle also applied to systems of bodies at rest and to light, it seemed that it was truly universal.

The final stage of his argument came when Maupertuis set out to interpret his principle in cosmological terms. ‘Least action’ sounds like an economy principle, roughly equivalent to the idea of economy of effort in daily life. A universal principle of economy of effort would seem to display the working of wisdom in the very construction of the universe. This seems, in Maupertuis's view, a more powerful argument for the existence of an infinitely wise creator than any other that can be advanced.

He published his thinking on these matters in his Essai de cosmologie (Essay on cosmology) of 1750. He shows that the major arguments advanced to prove God, from the wonders of nature or the apparent regularity of the universe, are all open to objection (what wonder is there in the existence of certain particularly repulsive insects, what regularity is there in the observation that all the planets turn in nearly the same plane – exactly the same plane might have been striking but 'nearly the same plane' is far less convincing). But a universal principle of wisdom provides an undeniable proof of the shaping of the universe by a wise creator.

Hence the principle of least action is not just the culmination of Maupertuis's work in several areas of physics, he sees it as his most important achievement in philosophy too, giving an incontrovertible proof of God.

The flaws in his reasoning are principally that there is no obvious reason why the product of mass, velocity and distance should be particularly viewed as corresponding to action, and even less reason why its minimisation should be an 'economy' principle like a minimisation of effort. Indeed, the product of mass, velocity and distance is mathematically the equivalent of the product of the live force and time; thus the integral over distance of the product of mass and velocity is equivalent of the integral over time of the live force. Leibniz had already shown that this quantity is likely to be either minimised or maximised in natural phenomena. Minimising this quantity could conceivably demonstrate economy, but how could maximising it? (See also the corresponding principles of stationary actions by Lagrange and Hamilton).

=== Relation to Kant ===
In Universal Natural History and Theory of the Heavens, Immanuel Kant quotes Maupertuis's 1745 discussion of nebula-like objects, which Maupertuis notes are actually collections of stars, including Andromeda.

Arthur Schopenhauer suggested that Immanuel Kant's "most important and brilliant doctrine"—contained in the Critique of Pure Reason (1781)—was asserted by Maupertuis:

But what are we to say when we find Kant's most important and brilliant doctrine, that of the ideality of space and of the merely phenomenal existence of the corporeal world, expressed already thirty years previously by Maupertuis? ... Maupertuis expresses this paradoxical doctrine so decidedly, and yet without the addition of proof, that it must be supposed that he also obtained it from somewhere else.

== Honours ==
- The crater Maupertuis on the Moon is named after him, as is the asteroid 3281 Maupertuis.

== Main works ==
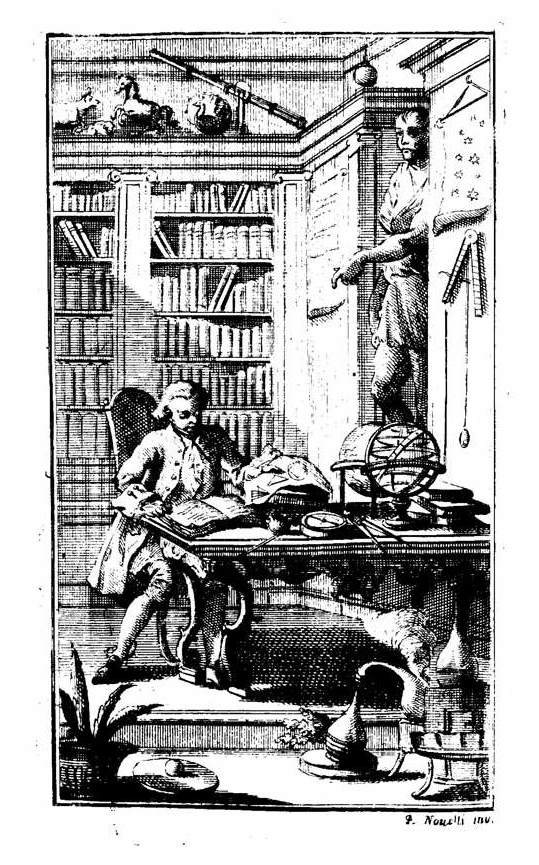
Lettres

- — (1738). La Figure de la Terre, déterminée par les Observations de Messieurs Maupertuis, Clairaut, Camus, Le Monnier & de M. l'Abbé Outhier, accompagnés de M. Celsius (in French) – via Gallica.
- — (1740). Réflexions philosophiques sur l'origine des langues et la signification des mots (in French). Archived from the original on 31 May 2016.
- — (1741). Discours sur la parallaxe de la lune (in French).
- — (1742). Discours sur les différentes figures des astres [Discourse on the different figures of the stars] (in French) (2nd ed.).
- — (1742). Eléments de la géographie (in French).
- — (1742). Lettre sur la comète de 1742 (in French).
- — (1743). Astronomie nautique : ou Elémens d'astronomie, tant pour un observatoire fixe, que pour un observatoire mobile (in French) – via Gallica.
- — (1744). Accord de différentes loix de la nature qui avoient jusqu'ici paru incompatibles (in French). English translation
- — (1745). Vénus physique (in French).
- — (1746). Les loix du mouvement et du repos déduites d'un principe metaphysique (in French). English translation
- — (1749). Essai de philosophie morale (in French) – via Gallica.
- — (1750). Essai de Cosmologie (in French).
- — (1756). [Opere] (in French). Vol. 3. Lyon: Jean-Marie Bruyset.
- — (1756). [Opere] (in French). Vol. 4. Lyon: Jean-Marie Bruyset.
