= Promontorium Heraclides =

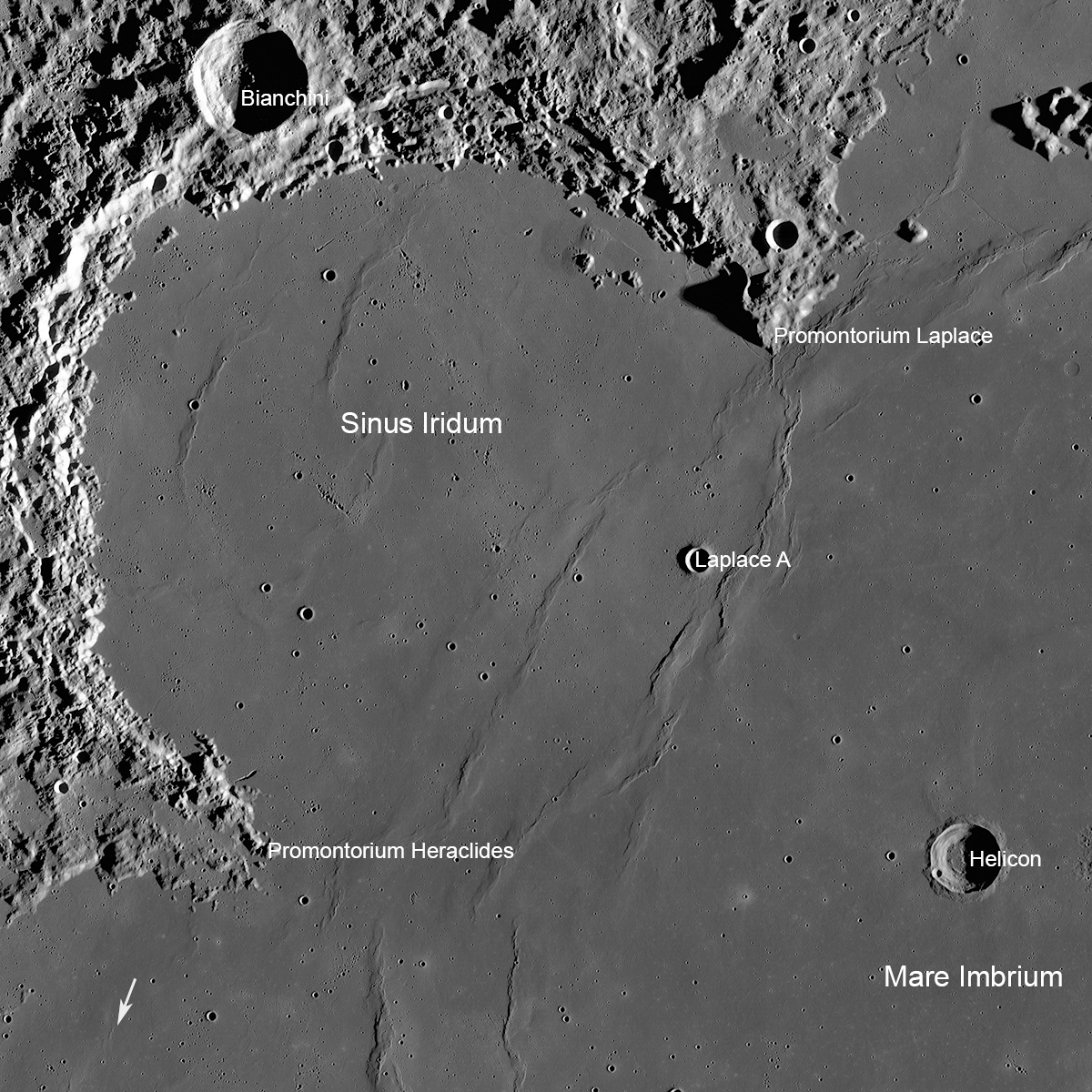
Annotated Sinus Iridum by LRO; Promontorium Heraclides at bottom-left

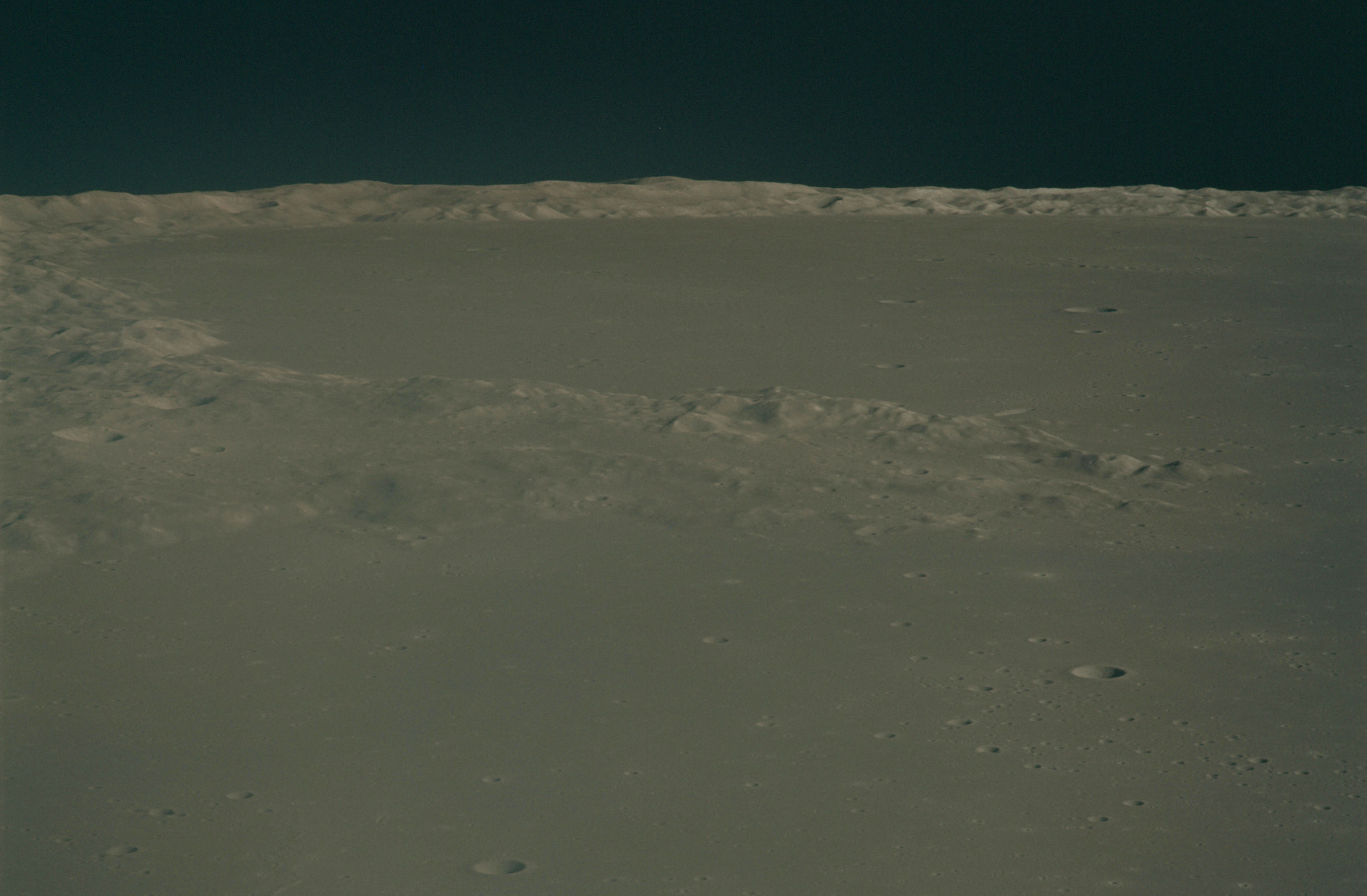
Oblique view across Promontorium Heraclides and Sinus Iridum from Apollo 15

Promontorium Heraclides is a raised mountainous cape situated in Mare Imbrium on the near side of the Moon. Its selenographic coordinates are 40.3° N, 33.2° W and it is 50 km in diameter. It marks the western edge of the bay of Sinus Iridum. Promontorium Heraclides is named after Heraclides Ponticus, a Greek philosopher and astronomer. The Soviet lunar probe Luna 17 landed about 30 km from Promontorium Heraclides on November 17, 1970. The land form is depicted as the face of a woman looking across Sinus Iridum in a 1679 lunar map by Giovanni Domenico Cassini; this depiction, of disputed origin, is known as the "Moon Maiden".
