= Urbain Le Verrier =

French astronomer and celestial mechanician (1811–1877)

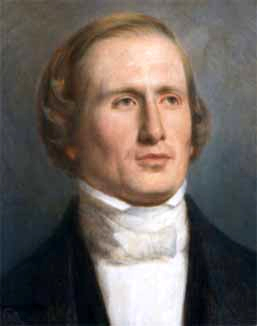
- Born: Urbain Jean Joseph Le Verrier; 11 March 1811; Saint-Lô, First French Empire
- Died: 23 September 1877 (aged 66); Paris, French Third Republic
- Education: École Polytechnique
- Known for: Discovery of Neptune; Euler's three-body problem; Faddeev–LeVerrier algorithm
- Awards: Copley Medal (1846); Gold Medal of the Royal Astronomical Society (1868, 1876)
- Scientific career
- Fields: celestial mechanics, astronomy

Urbain Jean Joseph Le Verrier (French: [yʁbɛ̃ ʒɑ̃ ʒozɛf lə vɛʁje]; 11 March 1811 – 23 September 1877) was a French astronomer and celestial mechanician. and is best known for predicting the existence and position of Neptune using only mathematics.

The calculations were made to explain discrepancies with Uranus's orbit and the laws of Johannes Kepler and Isaac Newton. Le Verrier sent the coordinates to Johann Gottfried Galle in Berlin, asking him to verify. Galle found Neptune the same night he received Le Verrier's letter, within 1° of the predicted position.

The discovery of Neptune is widely regarded as a dramatic validation of celestial mechanics, and is one of the most remarkable moments of 19th-century science.

== Life ==
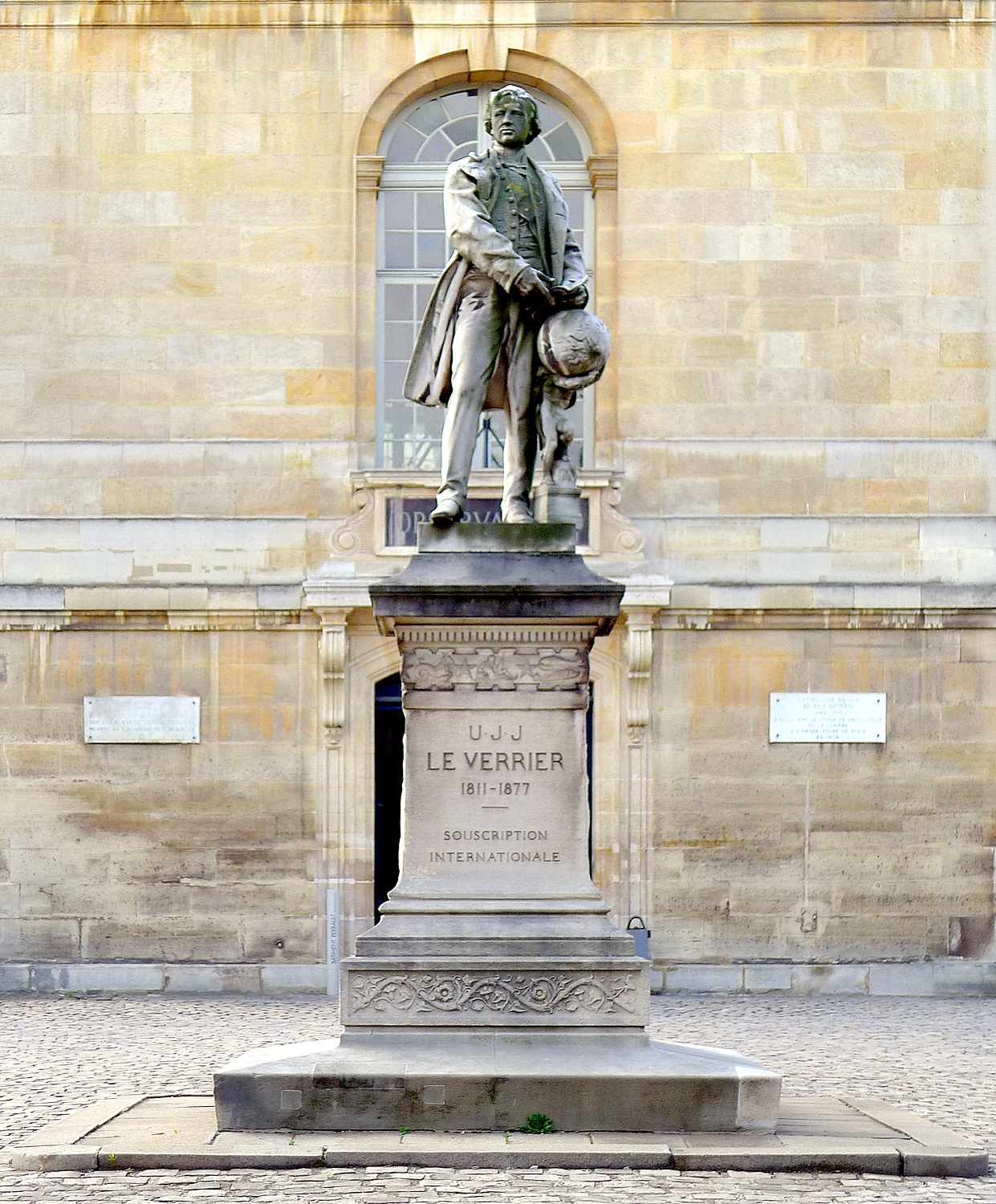
Statue of Le Verrier at the Paris Observatory

=== Early years ===
Urbain Le Verrier was born at Saint-Lô, Manche, France, to a modest bourgeois family, his parents being Louis-Baptiste Le Verrier and Marie-Jeanne-Josephine-Pauline de Baudre.

He studied at the École Polytechnique – briefly chemistry, under Gay-Lussac, writing papers on the combinations of phosphorus and hydrogen, and of phosphorus and oxygen.

He then switched to astronomy, particularly celestial mechanics, and accepted a job at the Paris Observatory. He spent most of his professional life there, eventually becoming director of the institution, from 1854 to 1870 and again from 1873 to 1877.

In 1846 Le Verrier became a member of the French Academy of Sciences, and in 1855 was elected a foreign member of the Royal Swedish Academy of Sciences. His name is one of the 72 inscribed on the Eiffel Tower.

=== Career ===
==== Early work ====
Le Verrier's first work in astronomy was presented to the Académie des Sciences in September 1839, entitled Sur les variations séculaires des orbites des planètes (On the Secular Variations of the Orbits of the Planets). This work addressed the then most-important question in astronomy: the stability of the Solar System, first investigated by Laplace. He was able to derive some important limits on the motions of the system, but due to the inaccurately-known masses of the planets, his results were tentative.

From 1844 to 1847, Le Verrier published a series of works on periodic comets, in particular those of Lexell, Faye and DeVico. He was able to show some interesting interactions with the planet Jupiter, proving that certain comets were actually the reappearance of previously-known comets flung into different orbits.

==== Discovery of Neptune ====
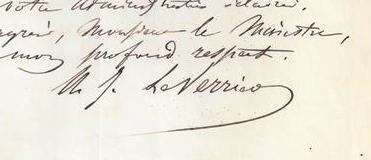
LeVerrier's autograph

Le Verrier's most famous achievement is his prediction of the existence of the then unknown planet Neptune, using only mathematics and astronomical observations of the known planet Uranus. Encouraged by physicist Arago, Director of the Paris Observatory, Le Verrier was intensely engaged for months in complex calculations to explain small but systematic discrepancies between Uranus's observed orbit and the one predicted from the laws of gravity of Newton. At the same time, but unknown to Le Verrier, similar calculations were made by John Couch Adams in England. Le Verrier announced his final predicted position for Uranus's unseen perturbing planet publicly to the French Academy on 31 August 1846, two days before Adams's final solution was privately mailed to the Royal Greenwich Observatory. Le Verrier transmitted his own prediction by 18 September in a letter to Johann Galle of the Berlin Observatory. The letter arrived five days later, and the planet was found with the Berlin Fraunhofer refractor that same evening, 23 September 1846, by Galle and Heinrich d'Arrest within 1° of the predicted location near the boundary between Capricorn and Aquarius.

There was, and to an extent still is, controversy over the apportionment of credit for the discovery. There is no ambiguity to the discovery claims of Le Verrier, Galle, and d'Arrest. Adams's work was begun earlier than Le Verrier's but was finished later and was unrelated to the actual discovery. Not even the briefest account of Adams's predicted orbital elements was published until more than a month after Berlin's visual confirmation. Adams made full public acknowledgement of Le Verrier's priority and credit (not forgetting to mention the role of Galle) when he presented his work to the Royal Astronomical Society in November 1846:

I mention these dates merely to show that my results were arrived at independently, and previously to the publication of those of M. Le Verrier, and not with the intention of interfering with his just claims to the honours of the discovery; for there is no doubt that his researches were first published to the world, and led to the actual discovery of the planet by Dr. Galle, so that the facts stated above cannot detract, in the slightest degree, from the credit due to M. Le Verrier.

— Adams (1846)

==== Tables of the planets ====
Early in the 19th century, the methods of predicting the motions of the planets were somewhat scattered, having been developed over decades by many different researchers. In 1847, Le Verrier took on the task to "... embrace in a single work the entire planetary system, put everything in harmony if possible, otherwise, declare with certainty that there are as yet unknown causes of perturbations...", a work which would occupy him for the rest of his life.

Le Verrier began by re-evaluating, to the 7th order, the technique of calculating the planetary perturbations known as the perturbing function. This derivation, which resulted in 469 mathematical terms, was complete by 1849. He next collected observations of the positions of the planets as far back as 1750. Examining these and correcting for inconsistencies with the most recent data occupied him until 1852.

Le Verrier published, in the Annales de l'Observatoire de Paris, tables of the motions of all of the known planets, releasing them as he completed them, starting in 1858. The tables formed the fundamental ephemeris of the Connaissance des Temps, the astronomical almanac of the Bureau des Longitudes, until about 1912. About that time, Le Verrier's work on the outer planets was revised and expanded by Gaillot.

==== Precession of Mercury ====
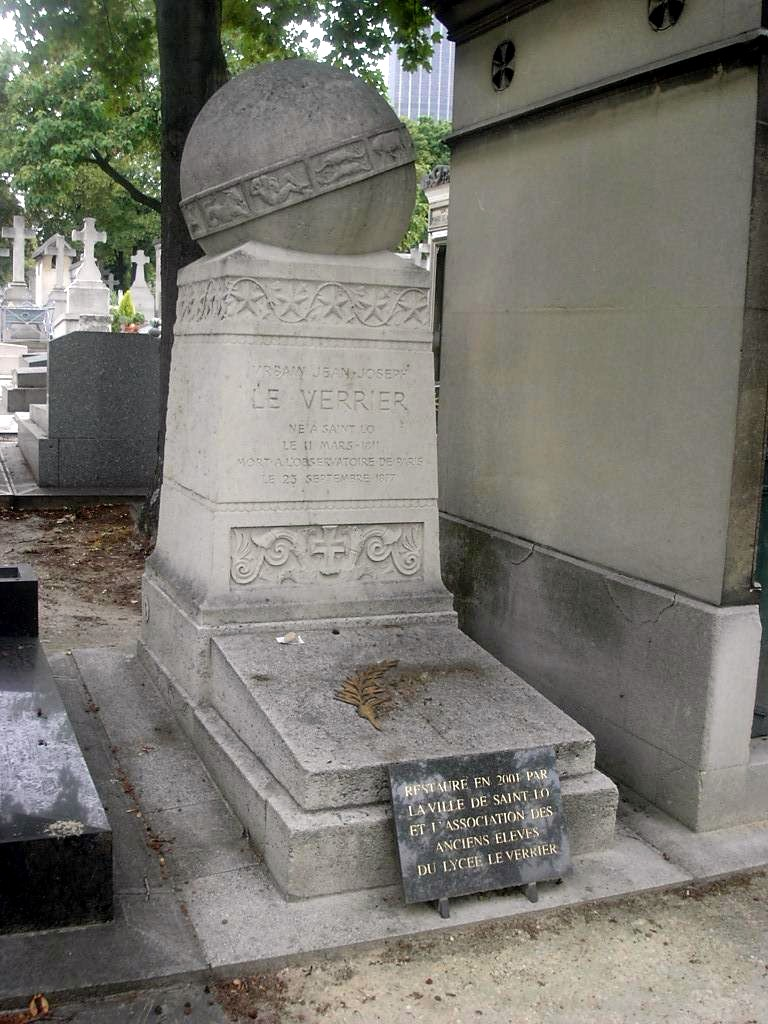
Le Verrier's grave

Le Verrier began studying the motion of Mercury as early as 1843, with a report entitled Détermination nouvelle de l'orbite de Mercure et de ses perturbations (A New Determination of the Orbit of Mercury and its Perturbations). In 1859, Le Verrier was the first to report that the slow precession of Mercury's orbit around the Sun could not be completely explained by Newtonian mechanics and perturbations by the known planets. He suggested, among possible explanations, that another planet (or perhaps, instead, a series of smaller 'corpuscules') might exist in an orbit even closer to the Sun than that of Mercury, to account for this perturbation. (Other explanations considered included a slight oblateness of the Sun.) The success of the search for Neptune based on its perturbations of the orbit of Uranus led astronomers to place some faith in this possible explanation, and the hypothetical planet was even named Vulcan. However, no such planet was ever found, and the anomalous precession was eventually explained by general relativity theory.

==== Roman calendar conversion tables ====
In Concordance des Dates de l’ancient Calendrier Romain avec le Style Julien pour les Années de Rome 691-709 (1866), Le Verrier devised charts to convert old Roman calendar dates into Julian ones. They were adopted by Napoleon III and Eugène Stoffel. However, Le Verrier mistakenly assumed that Julius Caesar in 46 BC intercalated only 67 days instead of 90. Le Verrier also mistakenly concluded that the years 56 BC and 54 BC were intercalary.

=== Later life ===
Le Verrier's methods of management were disliked by the staff of the Observatoire, and the disputes became so great that he was driven out in 1870. He was succeeded by Delaunay, but was reinstated in 1873 after Delaunay accidentally drowned. Le Verrier held the position until his death in 1877.

Le Verrier married Lucille Clotilde Choquet in 1837 and had three children. In 1847, he was elected to the American Philosophical Society. He died in Paris, France and was buried in the Montparnasse Cemetery. A large stone celestial globe sits over his grave. He will be remembered by the phrase attributed to Arago: "the man who discovered a planet with the point of his pen."

== Honours ==
- Gold Medal of the Royal Astronomical Society – 1868 and 1876
- Namesake of craters on the Moon and Mars, a ring of Neptune, and the asteroid 1997 Leverrier
- One of the 72 names engraved on the Eiffel Tower

== See also ==
- Discovery of Neptune
- List of works by Henri Chapu Statue of Le Verrier
- Lyttleton, Raymond Arthur, (1968) Mysteries of the Solar System, Clarendon, Oxford, UK (1968), Chapter 7: The discovery of Neptune
