= Jean Bouguer =

French hydrographer and mathematician

Jean Bouguer (or Jan Bouguer; pronounced boo-GAYR) (died 1714) was a French hydrographer and mathematician from the Province of Brittany. A former maritime pilot who had lost a leg at Bantry in the 1689 French invasion of Ireland, causing him to leave active maritime service. Bouguer was appointed royal professor of hydrography in charge of the new École d'hydrographie at Le Croisic in June 1691. He was author of a highly regarded treatise on navigation and piloting (Traité complet de la navigation, Paris, Guignard, 1698). He would also teach students privately in a one-room school at his home, where he kept many astronomical and navigational instruments. He was well-versed in astronomy, mathematics, and hydrography, and held the certificate of Maîtrise d'hydrographe.

He had three children with his wife Marie Françoise Josseau, including sons Pierre Bouguer, who succeeded him in his position at Le Croisic and continued the family navigation school, and Jan Bouguer, who took over the family school when his brother left for Paris some years later.
