= Käymäjärvi inscriptions =

Historical inscriptions in Sweden

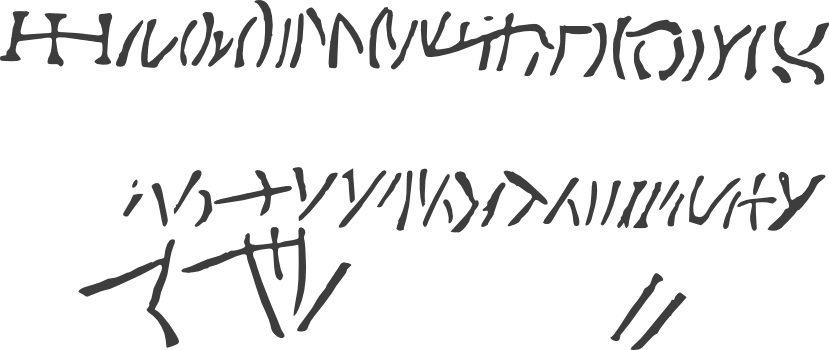
Käymäjärvi Inscriptions as drawn by Pierre Louis Maupertuis in 1737.

The Käymäjärvi inscriptions are two inscription-like mark rows on a stone approximately 52.5 cm high and 105 cm wide, engraved with characters similar to those in runic alphabets. The Käymäjärvi inscriptions are near Lake Käymäjärvi, about 26 km northwest of Pajala in northern Sweden. The inscriptions were first reported in 1689 and were thought to be man made. According to a 2018 report by archaeologists, geologists and historians; however, the inscriptions were found not to be man made but instead results of natural processes.

== First report ==
The Käymäjärvi Inscriptions were first reported by Olof Rudbeck Sr. (1630–1702) in the second volume of Atlantica (1689). The local inhabitants, especially the Saami, considered the stone to carry a very important message from their ancestors.

== Second report ==
The second author to report the inscriptions was Eric Brunnius (1706–83) of Uppsala University in a discussion about the town of Tornio (De urbe Torna; 1731). Brunnius states that the stone has rune characters and the engraving of a triple crown which was degraded and is absent. The physicist Anders Celsius (1701–44), also an early runologist, concluded that the inscriptions were not of runic character.

== Third report ==
Celsius and Pierre Louis Maupertuis (1698–1759) visited the stone around 11 April 1737, during their Earth meridian measurement expedition. Celsius and Maupertuis both sketched the inscriptions in their diaries of the journey. The tale of this travel and stone, at that time considered to be very exotic in nature, was presented in his application to the Académie des Sciences and may have influenced the decision to elect him to the Academy.

== 2018 report ==
According to a study made by archaeologists, geologists and historians published in the Cambridge Archaeological Journal in 2018, the inscriptions are not man-made but instead a result of natural processes.

== Sources ==
- Tobé, Erik, "Maupertius' "Berättelse om en färd till det inre av Lappland för att finna ett gammalt minnesmärke"", Oknytt No. 1-4, 1999, Vol. 20
