= La Condamine (crater) =

Crater on the Moon

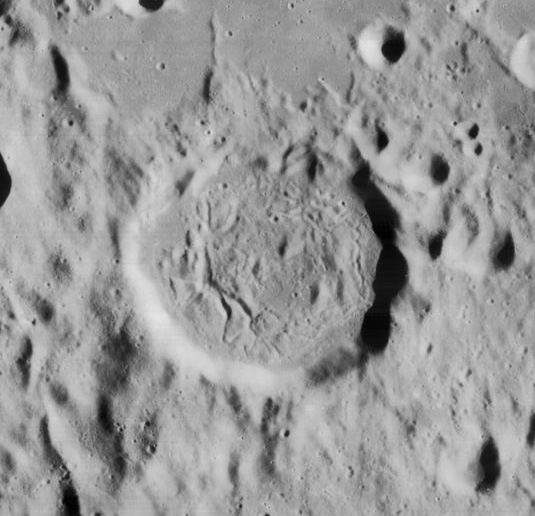
- Lunar Orbiter 4 image
- Coordinates: 53.4°N 28.2°W
- Diameter: 37 km
- Depth: 3.3km
- Colongitude: 187° at sunrise
- Formation: Lower Imbrian
- Eponym: C. M. de La Condamine

La Condamine is a small lunar impact crater that is located on the southern edge of the Mare Frigoris, in the northern part of the Moon. It lies to the northeast of the mountain-rimmed Sinus Iridum formation in the northwest part of the Mare Imbrium.

The crater rim is low and rounded, with the edge worn and eroded along the northeast side. The outer wall is somewhat polygonal, particularly in the southwestern half. The interior is fairly flat with no central peak, but there is a low curved, double rille in the western half that reaches toward the northern rim.

La Condamine is a crater of Lower (Early) Imbrian age.

== La Condamine during full moon ==
During full moon, the bright satellite crater La Condamine A, immediately northwest of La Condamine itself, is a handy guide to get to the location of this almost invisible crater. The brightness of La Condamine A is also noticeable on the photographic version of chart LAC 11 (page 22) in The Clementine Atlas of the Moon (Ben Bussey / Paul D. Spudis).

== Satellite craters ==
By convention these features are identified on lunar maps by placing the letter on the side of the crater midpoint that is closest to La Condamine.

| La Condamine | Latitude | Longitude | Diameter |
|---|---|---|---|
| A | 54.4° N | 30.1° W | 18 km |
| B | 58.8° N | 31.5° W | 17 km |
| C | 52.4° N | 30.2° W | 10 km |
| D | 53.5° N | 30.8° W | 10 km |
| E | 57.7° N | 31.9° W | 8 km |
| F | 57.3° N | 31.0° W | 7 km |
| G | 54.8° N | 28.1° W | 8 km |
| H | 53.1° N | 26.6° W | 6 km |
| J | 56.0° N | 19.3° W | 7 km |
| K | 51.9° N | 25.5° W | 7 km |
| L | 53.6° N | 26.7° W | 6 km |
| M | 54.2° N | 26.6° W | 7 km |
| N | 53.8° N | 25.6° W | 9 km |
| O | 55.1° N | 25.6° W | 7 km |
| P | 52.9° N | 23.5° W | 6 km |
| Q | 52.6° N | 23.9° W | 9 km |
| R | 55.0° N | 21.3° W | 7 km |
| S | 57.3° N | 25.2° W | 4 km |
| T | 59.2° N | 29.6° W | 6 km |
| U | 54.5° N | 22.7° W | 7 km |
| V | 54.5° N | 24.1° W | 6 km |
| X | 57.2° N | 21.4° W | 4 km |
