= Sinus Iridum =

Plain on the Moon

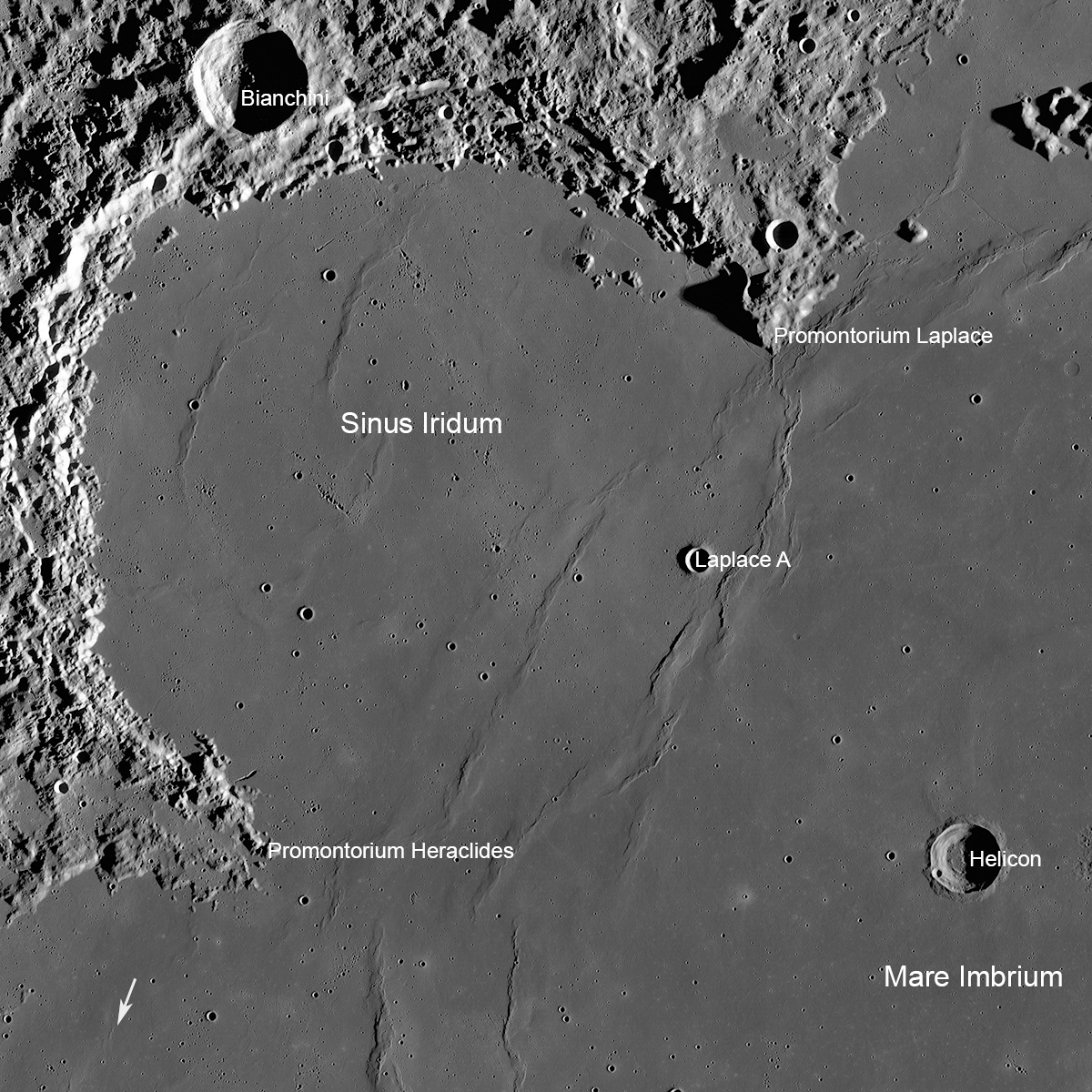
- Annotated Sinus Iridum by LRO
- Coordinates: 45.01°N 31.67°W
- Diameter: 249 km
- Eponym: Bay of Rainbows

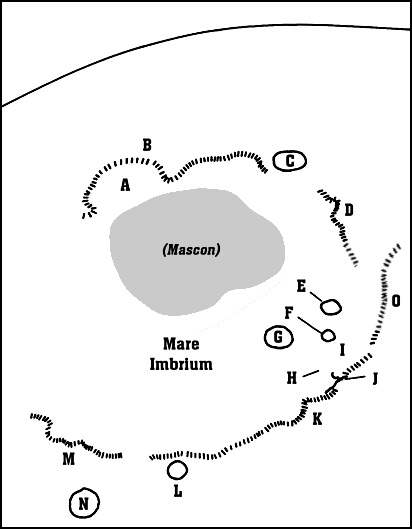
Map of Mare Imbrium's features. Sinus Iridum is marked "A"

Sinus Iridum /ˈsaɪnəs ˈɪrɪdəm/ (Latin sinus īridum "Bay of Rainbows") is a plain of basaltic lava that forms a northwestern extension to the Mare Imbrium on Earth's moon. It is surrounded from the northeast to the southwest by the Montes Jura range. The protruding part of the range at the southwest end is named Promontorium Heraclides, while that at the northeast end is called Promontorium Laplace. This bay and the surrounding mountains is considered one of the most beautiful features on the Moon, and is a favorite among lunar observers. The selenographic coordinates of the bay's center are 45.01° N, 31.67° W, and the diameter is 249 km.

== Geology ==
Sinus Iridum is formed from the remains of a large impact crater, which was subsequently flooded with basaltic lava, inundating the "sea" wall. The bay itself does not contain any notable impact craters, but does include the satellite crater Heraclides E in the south, Laplace A along the eastern edge, and Bianchini G in the north. The surface is level, but is marked by a number of wrinkle ridges (dorsa). Sinus Iridum is one of the largest craters of Upper (Late) Imbrian age.

== Appearance ==
When 10 to 11 days after new moon the Sinus Iridum is still in shadow, the Montes Jura can already be visible at the lunar terminator. This geometry is also called Golden Handle.

== Exploration ==
It was the planned landing site of Chang'e 3, China's 2013 lunar exploration mission, which instead landed nearby in Mare Imbrium.

== Satellite craters ==
By convention these features are identified on lunar maps by placing the letter on the side of the crater midpoint that is closest to Promontorium Heraclides.

Heraclides	Latitude	Longitude	Diameter
A	40.9° N	34.2° W	6 km
E	42.9° N	32.7° W	4 km
F	38.5° N	33.7° W	3 km

The following satellite craters are associated with the Promontorium Laplace.

Laplace	Latitude	Longitude	Diameter
A	43.7° N	26.8° W	9 km
B	51.3° N	19.8° W	5 km
D	47.3° N	25.5° W	11 km
E	50.3° N	19.8° W	6 km
F	45.6° N	19.8° W	6 km
L	51.7° N	21.0° W	7 km
M	52.2° N	19.9° W	6 km

== See also ==
- Volcanism on the Moon
