= List of people with craters of the Moon named after them =

The following is a list of people whose names were given to craters of the Moon. The list of approved names in the Gazetteer of Planetary Nomenclature maintained by the International Astronomical Union includes the person the crater is named for.

== A ==
- Ernst Karl Abbe
- Charles Greeley Abbot
- Niels Henrik Abel
- Antonio Abetti
- Giorgio Abetti
- Abu Abdullah al-Bakri
- Abū al-Wafā' al-Būzjānī
- Charles Hitchcock Adams
- John Couch Adams
- Walter Sydney Adams
- Agatharchides
- Agrippa
- Pierre d'Ailly
- George Biddell Airy
- Robert Grant Aitken
- Ajima Naonobu
- Harold Alden
- Kurt Alder
- Buzz Aldrin
- Nikolai Alekhin
- Alexander the Great
- Alfonso X of Castile
- Alfraganus
- Dinsmore Alter
- Florentino Ameghino
- Giovanni Battista Amici
- Ammonius Saccas
- Guillaume Amontons
- Roald Amundsen
- Anaxagoras
- Anaximander
- Anaximenes of Miletus
- Karel Anděl
- William Anders
- John August Anderson
- Michael P. Anderson
- Leif Erland Andersson
- Aleksandr Andronov
- Anders Jonas Ångström
- Ansgar
- Eugène Michel Antoniadi
- Dmitry Nikolayevich Anuchin
- Jean Baptiste Bourguignon d'Anville
- Petrus Apianus
- Apollonius of Perga
- Edward Victor Appleton
- François Arago
- Aratus
- Archimedes
- Archytas
- Friedrich Wilhelm Argelander
- Aristarchus of Samos
- Aristillus
- Aristotle
- Franciszek Armiński
- Neil Armstrong
- Christoph Arnold
- Svante Arrhenius
- Lev Artsimovich
- Aryabhata
- Arzachel
- Goryu Asada
- Giuseppe Asclepi
- Joseph Ashbrook
- Francis William Aston
- George Atwood
- Autolycus of Pitane
- Arthur Auwers
- Adrien Auzout
- Oswald Avery
- Avicenna

== B ==
- Walter Baade
- Georgi Babakin
- Charles Babbage
- Harold D. Babcock
- Ernst Emil Alexander Back
- Oskar Backlund
- Roger Bacon
- Benjamin Baillaud
- Jean Sylvain Bailly
- Francis Baily
- Ibn Bajjah
- Aleksei Balandin
- Vasco Núñez de Balboa
- Fernand Baldet
- William Ball
- Johann Jakob Balmer
- Tadeusz Banachiewicz
- Wilder Dwight Bancroft
- Frederick Banting
- Charles Glover Barkla
- Edward Emerson Barnard
- Francesco Barozzi
- Daniel Barringer
- Muhammad ibn Jābir al-Harrānī al-Battānī
- Ibn Battuta
- Johann Bayer
- Antonín Bečvář
- Wilhelm Beer
- Torbern Bergman
- Friedrich Wilhelm Bessel
- Nur Ed-Din Al Betrugi
- Giuseppe Biancani
- Francesco Bianchini - Bianchini crater north of Sinus Iridum
- Giovanni Bianchini - Blanchinus crater - Southern Hemisphere
- Wilhelm von Biela
- Jacques de Billy
- Hiram Bingham III
- Abū Rayhān al-Bīrūnī
- Mary Adela Blagg
- Nathaniel Bliss
- Étienne Bobillier
- Johann Elert Bode
- Niels Bohr
- Priscilla Fairfield Bok
- János Bolyai
- George Phillips Bond - named for G. Bond crater
- Aimé Bonpland
- George Boole
- Émile Borel
- Roger Joseph Boscovich (or Rudjer Bošković)
- Jagdish Chandra Bose
- Ira S. Bowen
- Frederick Sumner Brackett
- Tycho Brahe
- Edward William Brayley
- Sir David Brewster
- David McDowell Brown
- Catherine Wolfe Bruce
- Giordano Bruno
- Henri Buisson
- Johann Tobias Bürg
- Joost Bürgi
- Johann K. Burckhardt
- Sherburne Wesley Burnham
- Richard Evelyn Byrd

== C ==
- Cai Lun
- Santiago Ramón y Cajal
- Calippus
- Robert Curry Cameron
- Campanus of Novara
- Annie Jump Cannon
- Francesco Capuano di Manfredonia
- Francesco Carlini
- Paolo Casati
- Miguel A. Catalán
- Saint Catherine of Alexandria
- Augustin Louis Cauchy
- Bonaventura Cavalieri
- Henry Cavendish
- Arthur Cayley
- Anders Celsius
- Jean Chacornac
- James Challis
- Sergei Chaplygin
- Kalpana Chawla
- Pafnuty Chebyshev
- Nikolai Chernyshev
- Temple Chevallier
- Franceso degli Stabili Cichus
- Laurel Clark
- Rudolf Clausius
- Christopher Clavius
- Cleostratus
- Agnes Mary Clerke
- William Coblentz
- Michael Collins (astronaut)
- Edward Uhler Condon
- Marquis de Condorcet
- Conon of Samos
- Nicolaus Copernicus
- Gerty Theresa Cori
- Cristóbal Acosta
- Andrew Crommelin
- Peter Crüger
- Ctesibius
- Pierre Curie

== D ==
- Louis Daguerre
- Reginald A. Daly
- John Frederick Daniell
- Heinrich Louis d'Arrest
- Maurice Darney
- Charles Darwin
- Gabriel Auguste Daubrée
- Humphry Davy
- William Rutter Dawes
- Jean Baptiste Joseph Delambre
- Charles-Eugène Delaunay
- Joseph-Nicolas Delisle
- William Frederick Denning
- René Descartes
- Jules Alfred Pierrot Deseilligny
- Henri-Alexandre Deslandres
- Denis Diderot
- Saint Dionysius
- Diophantus
- Peter Gustav Lejeune Dirichlet
- Audouin Dollfus
- John Dollond
- Giovanni Battista Donati
- Johann Gabriel Doppelmayr
- Henry Draper
- John Louis Emil Dreyer
- Hugh Latimer Dryden
- Dmitrij I. Dubyago
- Alexander D. Dubyago
- Richard Dunthorne
- Wladyslaw Dziewulski

== E ==
- Amelia Earhart (provisional)
- Thomas Edison
- Hans Egede
- Albert Einstein
- Thomas Gwyn Elger
- Mervyn A. Ellison
- Johann Franz Encke
- Epigenes
- Eratosthenes
- Joseph Erlanger
- Luis Enrique Erro
- Ernest Esclangon
- T. H. E. C. Espin
- Euclid
- Euctemon
- Eudoxus of Cnidus
- Leonhard Euler
- Arthur Evans
- Abraham ibn Ezra

== F ==
- Daniel Gabriel Fahrenheit
- Michael Faraday
- Ahmad ibn Muhammad ibn Kathīr al-Farghānī
- Hervé Faye
- Enrico Fermi
- Jean Fernel
- Abbas Ibn Firnas
- Lucius Taruntius Firmanus
- Camille Flammarion
- John Flamsteed
- Alexander Fleming
- Williamina Paton Stevens Fleming
- Philip Fox
- Girolamo Fracastoro
- Fra Mauro
- James Franck
- Jean-B. J. Fourier

== G ==
- Vasco da Gama
- Yuri Gagarin
- Claudius Galen
- Galileo Galilei
- Johann Gottfried Galle
- Évariste Galois
- Luigi Galvani
- George Gamow
- Irvine Clifton Gardner
- Annibale de Gasparis
- Pierre Gassendi
- Casimir Marie Gaudibert
- Luca Gaurico
- Carl Friedrich Gauss
- Joseph Louis Gay-Lussac
- Hans Geiger
- Gersonides
- Josiah Willard Gibbs
- Grove Karl Gilbert
- William Gilbert
- Friedrich Karl Ginzel
- Flavio Gioja
- Rudolf Goclenius, Jr.
- Louis Godin
- Camillo Golgi
- Benjamin A. Gould
- Ivan Grave
- George Green
- James Gregory
- Francesco Maria Grimaldi
- William Robert Grove
- Otto von Guericke
- John Guest
- Charles Édouard Guillaume
- Colin Stanley Gum
- Arnold Henry Guyot
- Hugo Gyldén

== H ==
- Wilhelm Karl von Haidinger
- Paul Hainzel
- Tadeáš Hájek
- J.B.S. Haldane
- George Ellery Hale
- Asaph Hall
- Edmond Halley
- Peter Andreas Hansen
- Spiru Haret
- Frederick James Hargreaves
- Harkhebi
- Ernst Hartwig
- Bernard Ray Hawke
- Ibn al-Haytham
- Hecataeus
- Oliver Heaviside
- Gottfried Heinsius
- Hermann von Helmholtz
- Joseph Henry
- Paul Henry and Prosper Henry
- Matthew Henson
- Pierre Hérigone
- Charles Hermite
- Hero of Alexandria, or Hero
- Caroline Herschel - named for C. Herschel crater
- John Herschel - named for J. Herschel crater
- William Herschel - named for Herschel crater
- Heinrich Hertz
- Hesiod
- Jaroslav Heyrovský
- David Hilbert
- George William Hill
- John Russell Hind
- Hippalus
- Hipparchus
- Walter Hohmann
- Edward Singleton Holden
- Robert Hooke
- Peder Horrebow
- Jeremiah Horrocks
- Martin van den Hove
- Edwin Hubble
- Sir William Huggins
- Rick Husband
- Thomas Henry Huxley
- Gaius Julius Hyginus
- Hypatia

== I ==
- Christian Ludwig Ideler
- Naum Ilyich Idelson
- Nikolai Yakovlevich Il'in — Il'in (crater)
- Albert Graham Ingalls
- Giovanni Inghirami
- Robert Thorburn Ayton Innes
- Abram Fedorovich Ioffe
- Aleksei Mihailovich Isaev
- Imre Izsak

== J ==
- Jabir ibn Aflah (Geber)
- Josiah Edward Spurr ( Spurr crater)
- Michael Jackson
- Zacharias Jansen
- Karl Jansky
- Pierre Jules César Janssen
- Louise Freeland Jenkins

== K ==
- Frederik Kaiser
- Immanuel Kant
- Theodore von Kármán
- Mstislav Keldysh
- Johannes Kepler
- Omar Khayyám
- Muhammad ibn Mūsā al-Khwārizmī
- Johann Kies
- Arthur Scott King
- Edward Skinner King
- Gottfried Kirch
- Gustav Kirchhoff
- Harold Knox-Shaw
- Rudolf König
- Sofia Kovalevskaya
- M.A. Koval'sky
- Adam Johann Krusenstern
- Gerard Peter Kuiper
- August Kundt
- George K. Kunowsky

== L ==
- Nicolas Louis de Lacaille
- Heinrich Eduard von Lade
- Joseph Jérôme Le François de Lalande
- Jean-Baptiste Lamarck
- Johann Heinrich Lambert
- Johann von Lamont
- Jonathan Homer Lane
- Michel van Langren
- William Lassell
- Ernest Lawrence
- Robert Henry Lawrence, Jr.
- Henrietta Swan Leavitt
- John Lee (astronomer)
- Pierre Charles Lemonnier
- Nicole-Reine Lepaute
- Jean Antoine Letronne
- Tullio Levi-Civita
- Anders Johan Lexell
- Aloysius Lilius
- Eric Mervyn Lindsay
- Hans Lippershey
- Joseph Johann Littrow
- Joseph Norman Lockyer
- Maurice (Moritz) Loewy
- Oswald Lohse
- Mikhail Lomonosov
- Augustus Edward Hough Love
- Jim Lovell
- Percival Lowell
- Charles Lyell

== M ==
- Sir Thomas Maclear
- William Duncan MacMillan
- Johann Heinrich Mädler
- Ferdinand Magellan
- Giovanni Antonio Magini
- Charles Malapert
- Al-Ma'mun
- Marcus Manilius
- Giovanni Domenico Maraldi
- Giacomo Filippo (Jacques Philippe) Maraldi
- Al-Marrakushi
- Albert Marth
- Julius Firmicus Maternus
- Annie Russell Maunder
- Walter Maunder
- Pierre Louis Maupertuis
- Francesco Maurolico
- Antonia Maury
- James Clerk Maxwell
- Tobias Mayer - T. Mayer crater
- Alexander George McAdie
- Sharon Christa McAuliffe
- William C. McCool
- William Frederick Meggers
- Lise Meitner
- Gregor Mendel
- Dmitri Mendeleev
- Menelaus of Alexandria
- Donald Howard Menzel
- Gerardus Mercator
- Marin Mersenne
- Milutin Milanković
- Jacob Milich
- William Allen Miller
- Marcel Minnaert
- Maryam Mirzakhani
- Maria Mitchell
- Sisir Kumar Mitra
- August Ferdinand Möbius
- Nikolay Moiseyev
- Gaspard Monge
- Abrahão de Moraes
- Nikolai Morozov
- Henry Moseley
- Johan Sigismund von Mösting
- Karl Müller
- Sir Roderick Murchison

== N ==
- Fridtjof Nansen
- John Napier
- Michael Neander
- Necho II - Necho crater
- Simon Newcomb
- Isaac Newton
- Friedrich Bernhard Gottfried Nicolai
- Jean Nicholas Nicollet
- Alfred Nobel
- Emmy Noether
- Robert Norman
- Pedro Nuñez Salaciense
- Joseph Nunn
- František Nušl

== O ==
- Hermann Oberth
- Marcus O'Day
- Heinrich Olbers
- Friedrich Wilhelm Opelt
- Otto Moritz Opelt
- J. Robert Oppenheimer
- Theodor von Oppolzer
- Oronce Fine
- Wilhelm Ostwald

== P ==
- Johann Palisa
- Peter Simon Pallas
- Paracelsus
- John Stefanos Paraskevopoulos
- Johann Jacob Friedrich Wilhelm Parrot
- William Edward Parry
- John Whiteside Parsons
- Louis Pasteur
- Wolfgang Pauli
- Robert Peary
- Francis G. Pease
- Bertrand Meigh Peek
- Joseph Barclay Pentland
- Yevgeny Perepyolkin
- Robert M. Petrie
- Joseph von Petzval
- Georg von Peuerbach (Purbach)
- Philip III of Macedon
- John Phillips
- Philolaus of Croton
- Johannes Phocylides Holwarda (Jan Fokker)
- Giuseppe Piazzi
- Jean-Felix Picard
- Alessandro Piccolomini
- Marc-Auguste Pictet
- Edward Charles Pickering
- William Henry Pickering
- Pietro Pitati
- Bartholomaeus Pitiscus
- Max Planck
- John Playfair
- Pliny the Elder (Gaius Secundus)
- Plutarch
- Siméon Denis Poisson
- Marco Polo
- Ivan Ivanovich Polzunov
- Jean-Louis Pons
- Johannes (Iovianus) Pontanus, or Giovanni Pontani
- Alexander Stepanovich Popov or Cyril Popov
- Posidonius
- Proclus Lycius
- Mary Proctor
- Protagoras
- Ptolemy
- Pierre Puiseux
- Jan Evangelist

== R ==
- Ilan Ramon
- Albert William Recht
- Erasmus Reinhold
- Vincentio Reinieri
- Judith Arlene Resnik
- Matteo Ricci
- Giovanni Battista Riccioli
- Klaus Riedel
- George Willis Ritchey
- Carl Ritter
- George August Dietrich Ritter
- Ole Rømer
- James C. Ross
- Frank E. Ross
- Lord Rosse
- Ernest Rutherford
- Graham Ryder

== S ==
- Paul Sabatier
- Edward Sabine
- Vojtěch Šafařík
- Eugen Sänger
- Daniel Santbech
- Alberto Santos Dumont (Santos-Dumont (crater))
- Vikram Sarabhai
- Gellio Sasceride
- Horace-Bénédict de Saussure
- Samuel Arthur Saunder
- Carl Wilhelm Scheele
- Giovanni Schiaparelli
- Johann Friedrich Julius Schmidt
- Bernhard Schmidt
- Otto Yulyevich Schmidt
- Georg Schomberger
- Johann Hieronymus Schröter
- Theodor von Schubert
- Anton Maria Schyrleus of Rheita
- Angelo Secchi
- Hugo Hans Ritter von Seeliger
- Ján Andrej Segner
- Hugh Sempill
- Seneca the Younger
- Gerolamo Sersale
- Carl Keenan Seyfert
- Abraham Sharp
- Anne Sheepshanks
- Shi Shen
- Wacław Sierpiński
- Johann Esaias Silberschlag
- Simon Sinas
- Marie Sklodowska Curie
- Earl Slipher
- Vesto Slipher
- Marian Smoluchowski
- Willebrord Snellius
- Frederick Soddy
- Mary Fairfax Somerville
- Samuel Thomas Sömmering
- Sosigenes of Alexandria
- Sir James South
- Lazzaro Spallanzani
- Gustav Spörer
- Josiah Edward Spurr ( Spurr crater)
- Johannes Stadius
- Nicholas Steno
- Andreas Stöberl
- Johannes Stöffler
- George Johnstone Stoney
- Thomas Street
- Strabo
- Lewis A. Swift
- Leó Szilárd

== T ==
- Pietro Tacchini
- Tacitus
- André Tacquet
- Taruntius
- Brook Taylor
- Léon Teisserenc de Bort
- Ernst Wilhelm Leberecht Tempel
- Nikola Tesla
- Valentina Tereshkova
- Thales
- Theaetetus
- Theon of Alexandria
- Theon of Smyrna
- Theophrastus
- Timaeus
- Timocharis
- Félix Tisserand
- Konstantin Eduardovich Tsiolkovskiy
- Samuel Tolansky
- Alexey Tolstoy
- Craig R. Tooley
- Franz de Paula Triesnecker
- Étienne Léopold Trouvelot
- Herbert Hall Turner

== U ==
- Friedrich August Ukert
- Ulugh Beg

== V ==
- Jules Verne
- Urbain Le Verrier
- Frank W. Very
- Vesalius
- Vladimir Petrovich Vetchinkin
- Mikhail Anatolevich Vilev
- Leonardo da Vinci
- Rudolf Virchow
- Artturi Ilmari Virtanen
- Marcus P. Vitruvius
- Vincenzo Viviani
- Adriaan Vlacq
- Hermann Carl Vogel
- Vladislav Volkov
- Alessandro Volta
- Vito Volterra
- Leonid Alexandrovich Voskresenskiy

== W ==
- Joseph Albert Walker
- Alfred Russel Wallace
- Otto Wallach
- Bernhard Walther
- Bernard Wapowski
- Pehr Vilhelm Wargentin
- Michael Wargo
- Worcester Reed Warner
- Alan Tower Waterman
- James Watt
- Chester Burleigh Watts
- Thomas William Webb
- Alfred Wegener
- Edmund Weiss
- H. G. Wells
- William Whewell
- Fred Lawrence Whipple
- Moritz Ludwig George Wichmann
- Uco van Wijk
- Rupert Wildt
- Hugh Percy Wilkins
- Arthur Stanley Williams
- John Winthrop
- Carroll Taylor Wiseman
- Erazmus Ciolek Witelo
- Friedrich Wöhler
- Max Wolf
- Francis Wollaston
- Johann Philipp von Wurzelbauer

== X ==
- Xenophanes
- Xenophon

== Y ==
- Charles T. Yerkes
- Ibn Yunus

== Z ==
- Franz Xaver von Zach
- Abraham Zacuto (or Zagut)
- Herman Zanstra
- Alexander Dmitrievich Zasyadko
- Zeno of Citium
- Zhang Heng
- Johann Karl Friedrich Zöllner

== See also ==
- Lunar craters named for space explorers
- Stars named after people
- List of minor planets named after people
- List of craters on Mars named after people
