= Sinus Lunicus =

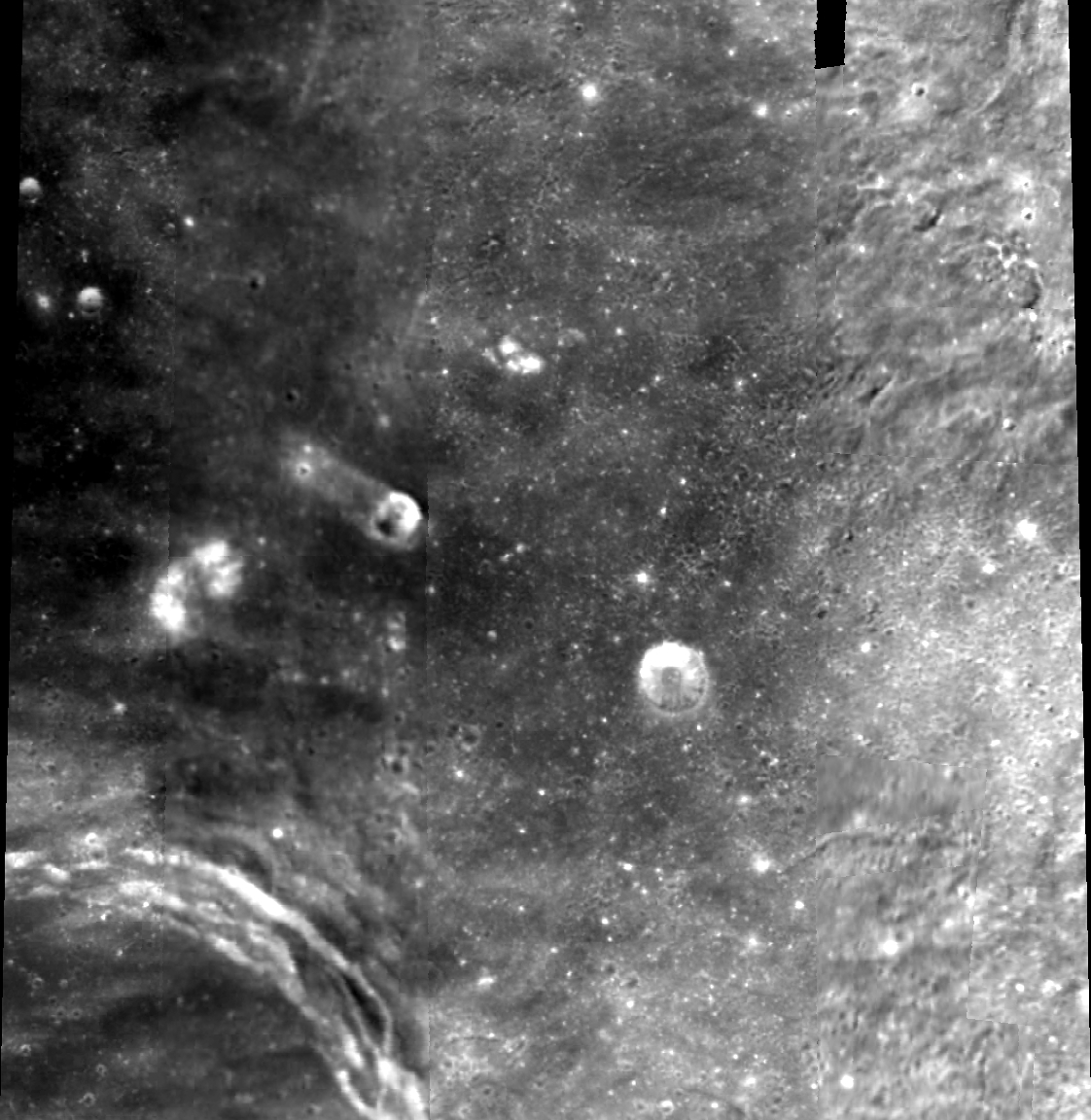
- Coordinates: 32.4°N 1.9°W
- Diameter: 120 km (75 mi)
- Eponym: Bay of Lunik

Sinus Lunicus (/ˈsaɪnəs ˈluːnɪkəs/; Latin for "Bay of Lunik") is an area of lunar mare along the southeast edge of the Mare Imbrium on the Earth's Moon. It is formed by the area enclosed by the prominent craters Archimedes to the southwest, Autolycus to the southeast, and Aristillus to the northeast. The bay is open to the northwest, and faces the Montes Spitzbergen, a small chain of mountains.

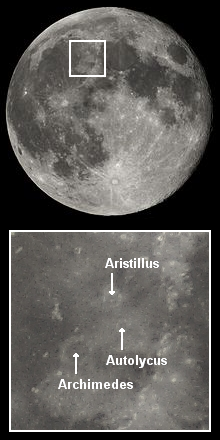
Location of Sinus Lunicus on the Moon

This bay was named the Bay of Lunik by the International Astronomical Union (IAU) in 1970 to honor the landing site of Luna 2, the first human space probe to make contact with another interplanetary body. The Luna 2 landed in the gap between the craters Archimedes and Autolycus on September 14, 1959.

The selenographic coordinates of Sinus Lunicus are 32.4° N and 1.9° W. Its diameter is 120 kilometers. The most distinctive features on the bay are the complex outer ramparts of ejecta from the craters Aristillus and Autolycus, and the small satellite craters Archimedes C and Archimedes D. The albedo of the surface is brightened by overlapping ray material from Autolycus and Aristillus.
