= Palus Putredinis =

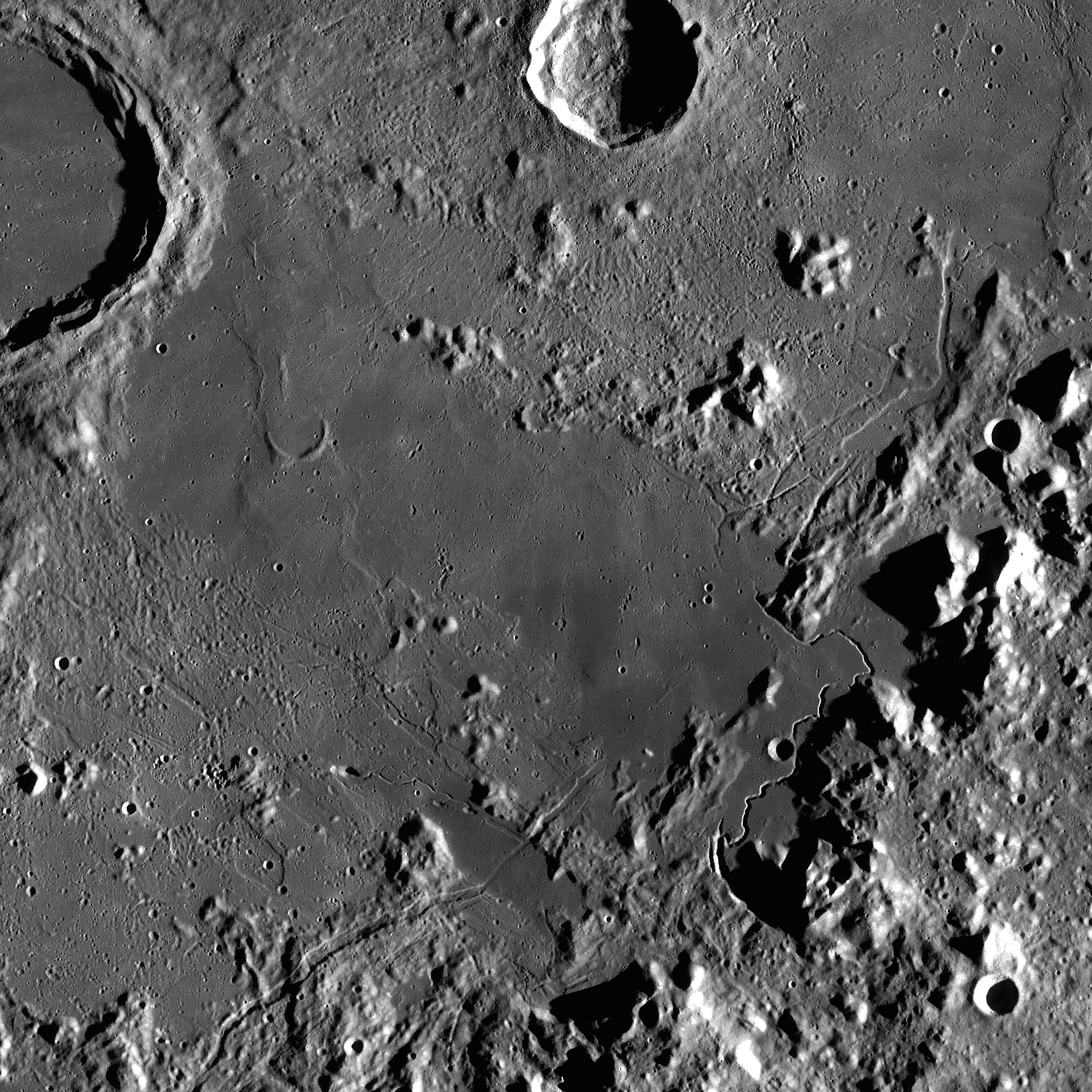
- Lunar Reconnaissance Orbiter image. Montes Apenninus are seen in the lower right, crater Archimedes in upper left and crater Autolycus on the top.
- Coordinates: 27.4°N 0.0°E
- Diameter: 180 km
- Eponym: Marsh of Decay

Palus Putredinis (Latin palūs pūtrēdinis "Marsh of Decay") is a small lunar mare in the basin of Mare Imbrium. It stretches from the crater Archimedes southeast toward the rugged Montes Apenninus range located on the southeastern edge of Mare Imbrium. This region is a nearly level, lava-flooded plain bounded by the crater Autolycus and nearby highlands to the northeast and the foothills of the Montes Archimedes to the southwest. The selenographic coordinates are 27.4° N, 0.0° E, and it lies within a diameter of 180 kilometers (110 mi).

In the southern part of this area is a rille system designated Rimae Archimedes. To the south is a prominent linear rille named Rima Bradley, and to the east is the Rima Hadley, which served as the landing site for Apollo 15, and the Rimae Fresnel. Just to the northwest of the Palus Putredinis midpoint is the nearly submerged crater Spurr. Luna 2 crashed in this area on September 13, 1959.

The basalts in this mare have been interpreted as rich in radioactive elements, but low in titanium. The mare basalts sampled at the Apollo 15 landing site are, "dominated by two low‐titanium varieties, the olivine‐normative basalts (3.30 Gyr) and the quartz‐normative basalts, which are slightly older (3.35 Gyr)". Volcanic glasses show ages of 3.30–3.60 Gyr.

== Dark 'W' or 'M' during full moon ==
Small telescopes reveal the presence of a dark 'W' or 'M' at Palus Putredinis. This is a low albedo feature which is known by observers of the full moon. An elongated dark spot southwest of the 'W' or 'M' was called Lacus Mozart during the Apollo program. The name Lacus Mozart was derived from Rima Mozart, an unofficial name which only appeared on Lunar Topographic Orthophotomaps 41-A3 and 41-B4. The dark 'W' or 'M' is also noticeable on the photographic version of chart LAC 41 (page 82) in The Clementine Atlas of the Moon (Ben Bussey / Paul D. Spudis).

== Gallery ==
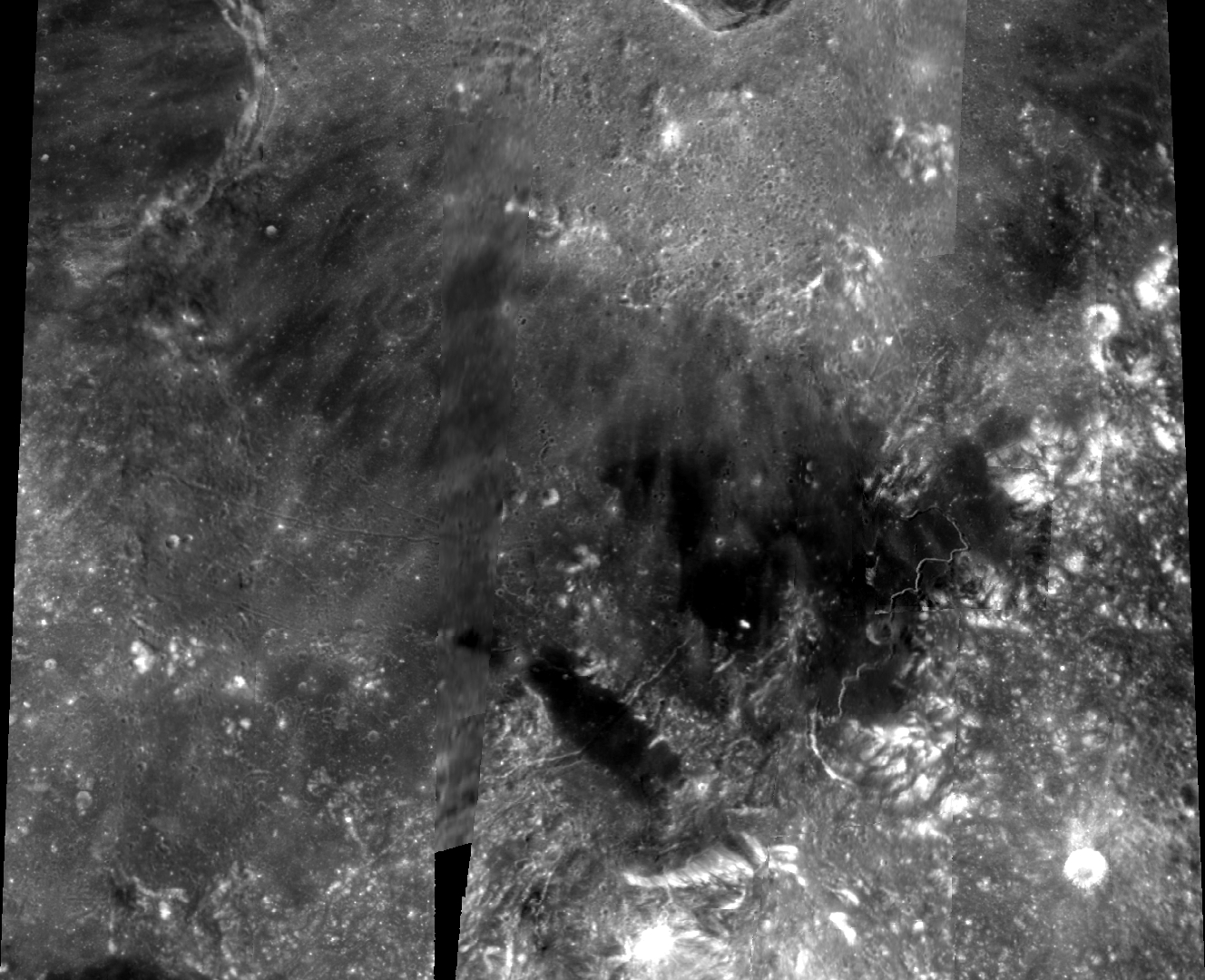
Mosaic of Clementine images taken with high Sun

== See also ==
- Volcanism on the Moon
