= Bancroft (crater) =

Lunar impact crater

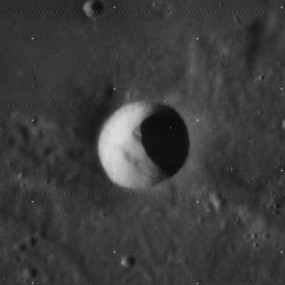
- Lunar Orbiter 4 image
- Coordinates: 28.0°N 6.4°W
- Diameter: 12.50 km (7.77 mi)
- Depth: 0.5 km
- Colongitude: 6° at sunrise
- Eponym: Wilder D. Bancroft

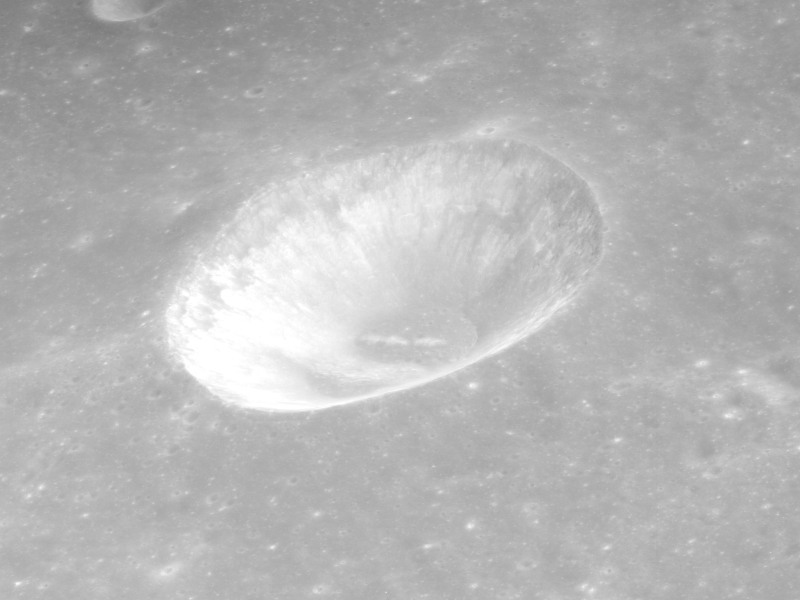
Oblique view from Apollo 15, facing north, showing the ridge in the crater floor

Bancroft is a small, bowl-shaped impact crater located to the southwest of Archimedes on the Mare Imbrium. It has a clean, sharp rim with no indication of wear. There is a linear ridge in the center of its floor, which is unusual for a crater of 13 km diameter. A wide, shallow depression runs from the rim of Bancroft southeast to the Montes Archimedes. There are some clefts at the edge of the mare to the west and southwest of the crater. Two small craters nearly to the west are named Feuillée and Beer.

This crater was named after American chemist Wilder D. Bancroft (1867–1953). Bancroft was previously identified as Archimedes A, before being renamed by the IAU in 1976.
