= Archimedes (crater) =

Impact crater on the Moon

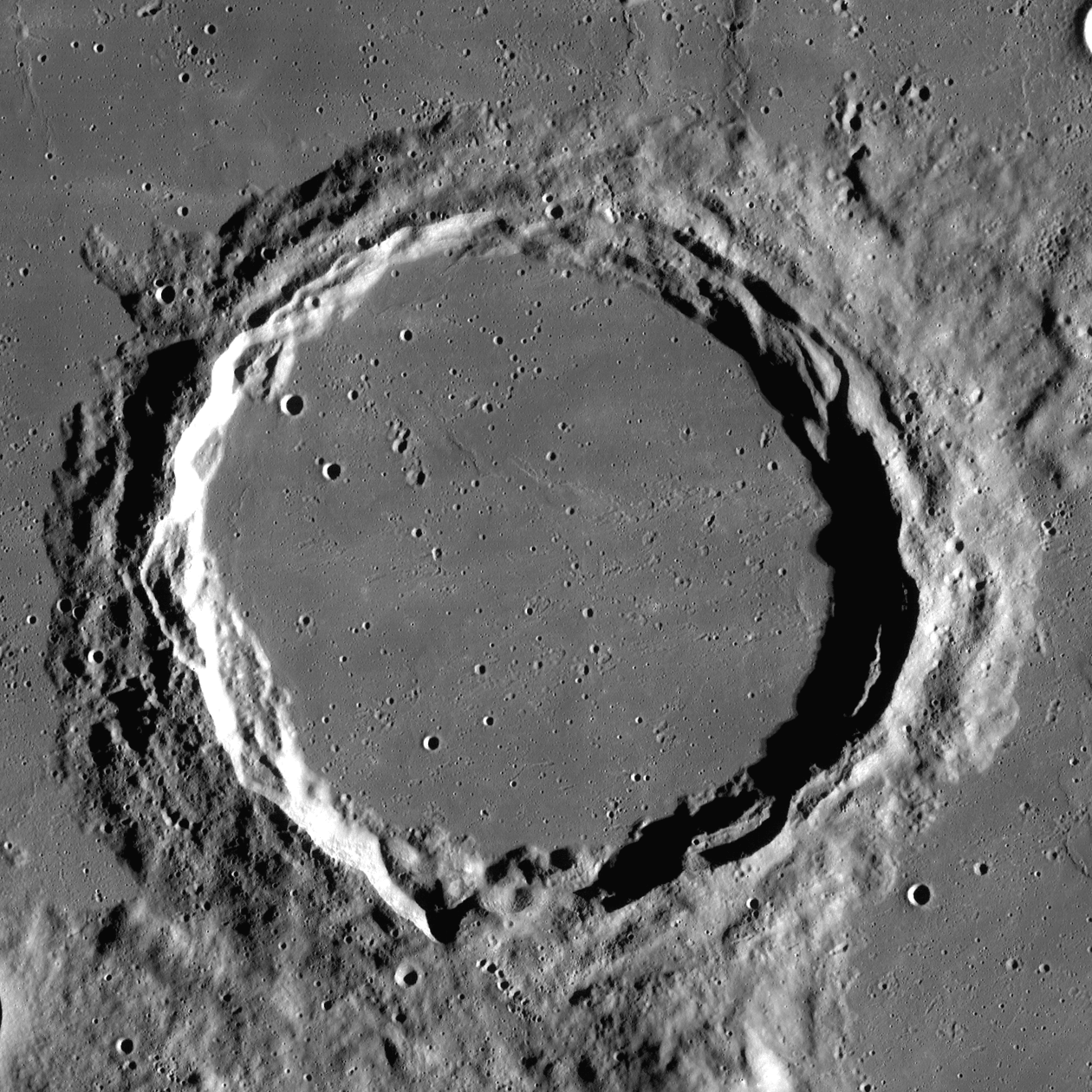
- LRO image
- Coordinates: 29.72°N 3.99°W
- Diameter: 81.04 km (50.36 mi)
- Depth: 1.6 km (0.99 mi)
- Colongitude: 4° at sunrise
- Formation: Late Imbrian
- Eponym: Archimedes

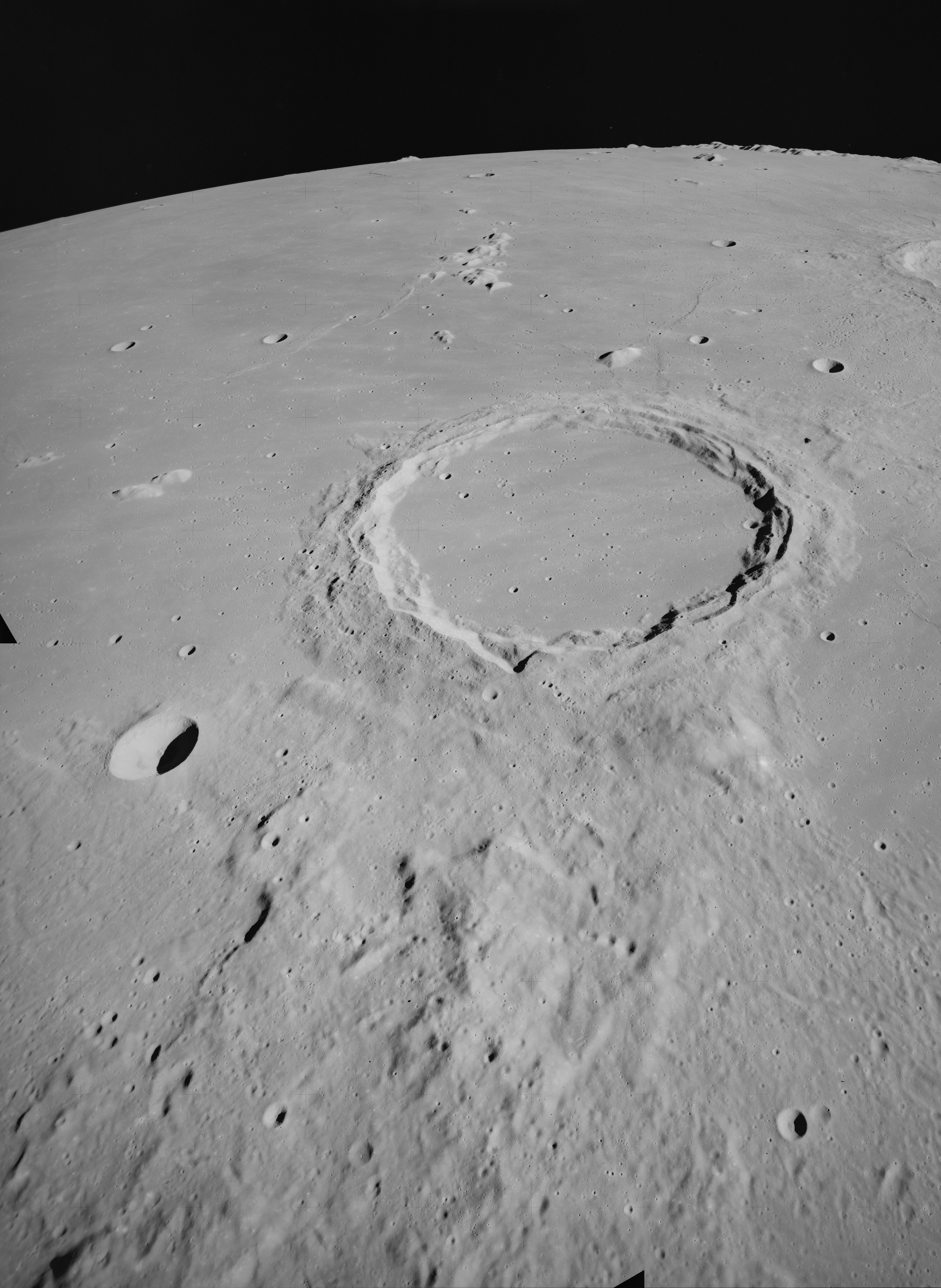
Archimedes from Apollo 15. NASA photo.

Archimedes is a large lunar impact crater on the eastern edges of the Mare Imbrium. It was named by the IAU in 1935. T. W. Webb described it as "one of the most regular walled plains", "the outer slope of the wall is very complex; a magnificent object against the rising or setting Sun". F. W. Price notes that, "at sunrise, Archimedes is a splendid sight in the telescope as the west wall casts long spires of shadow across the floor."

== Description ==
On the lunar geologic timescale, Archimedes dates to the Upper (Late) Imbrian age. The diameter of Archimedes is the largest of any crater on the Mare Imbrium. The rim has a significant outer rampart brightened with ejecta and the upper portion of a terraced inner wall, but lacks the ray system associated with younger craters. A triangular promontory extends 30 kilometers from the southeast of the rim.

The interior of the crater lacks a central peak, and is flooded with lava. It is devoid of significant raised features, although there are a few tiny meteor craters near the rim. Scattered wisps of bright ray material lie across the floor, most likely deposited by the impact that created Autolycus.

To the south of Archimedes extends the Montes Archimedes, a mountainous region. On the southeastern rim is the Palus Putredinis, a lava-flooded plain containing a system of rilles named the Rimae Archimedes, which extends over 150 kilometers. North-northwest of Archimedes stand the Montes Spitzbergen, a string of peaks in the Mare Imbrium. East of Archimedes is the crater Autolycus. Northeast of Archimedes is the prominent crater Aristillus. The lava plain between Archimedes, Aristillus, and Autolycus forms the Sinus Lunicus bay of Mare Imbrium. A wrinkle ridge leads away from Archimedes toward the north-northwest, crossing this mare.

The stretch of lunar surface between Archimedes and Autolycus was the site of the crash-landing of the Soviet probe Luna 2. This was the first craft to reach the surface of the Moon, landing September 13, 1959.

This crater is named after the Greek scientist Archimedes. Like many of the craters on the Moon's near side, it was given its name by Giovanni Riccioli, whose 1651 nomenclature system has become standardized. Earlier lunar cartographers had given the feature different names. Michael van Langren's 1645 map calls it "Roma" after the city of Rome. Johannes Hevelius called it "Mons Argentarius" after Monte Argentario region in Italy.

== Satellite craters ==
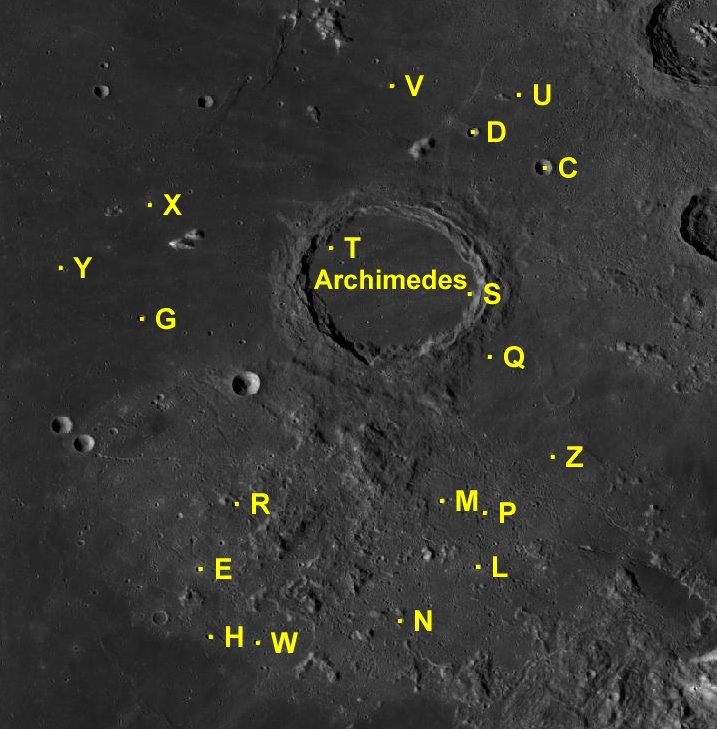
Satellite features of Archimedes

By convention these features are identified on lunar maps by placing the letter on the side of the crater midpoint that is closest to Archimedes.

| Archimedes | Latitude | Longitude | Diameter |
|---|---|---|---|
| C | 31.6° N | 1.5° W | 8 km |
| D | 32.2° N | 2.6° W | 5 km |
| E | 25.0° N | 7.2° W | 3 km |
| G | 29.1° N | 8.2° W | 3 km |
| H | 23.9° N | 7.0° W | 4 km |
| L | 25.0° N | 2.6° W | 4 km |
| M | 26.1° N | 3.2° W | 3 km |
| N | 24.1° N | 3.9° W | 3 km |
| P | 25.9° N | 2.5° W | 3 km |
| Q | 28.5° N | 2.4° W | 3 km |
| R | 26.0° N | 6.6° W | 4 km |
| S | 29.5° N | 2.7° W | 3 km |
| T | 30.3° N | 5.0° W | 3 km |
| U | 32.8° N | 1.9° W | 3 km |
| V | 32.9° N | 4.0° W | 3 km |
| W | 23.8° N | 6.2° W | 4 km |
| X | 31.0° N | 8.0° W | 2 km |
| Y | 29.9° N | 9.5° W | 2 km |
| Z | 26.8° N | 1.4° W | 2 km |

The following craters have been renamed by the IAU.

- Archimedes A - See Bancroft (crater).
- Archimedes F - See MacMillan (crater).
- Archimedes K - See Spurr (crater).

== Gallery ==
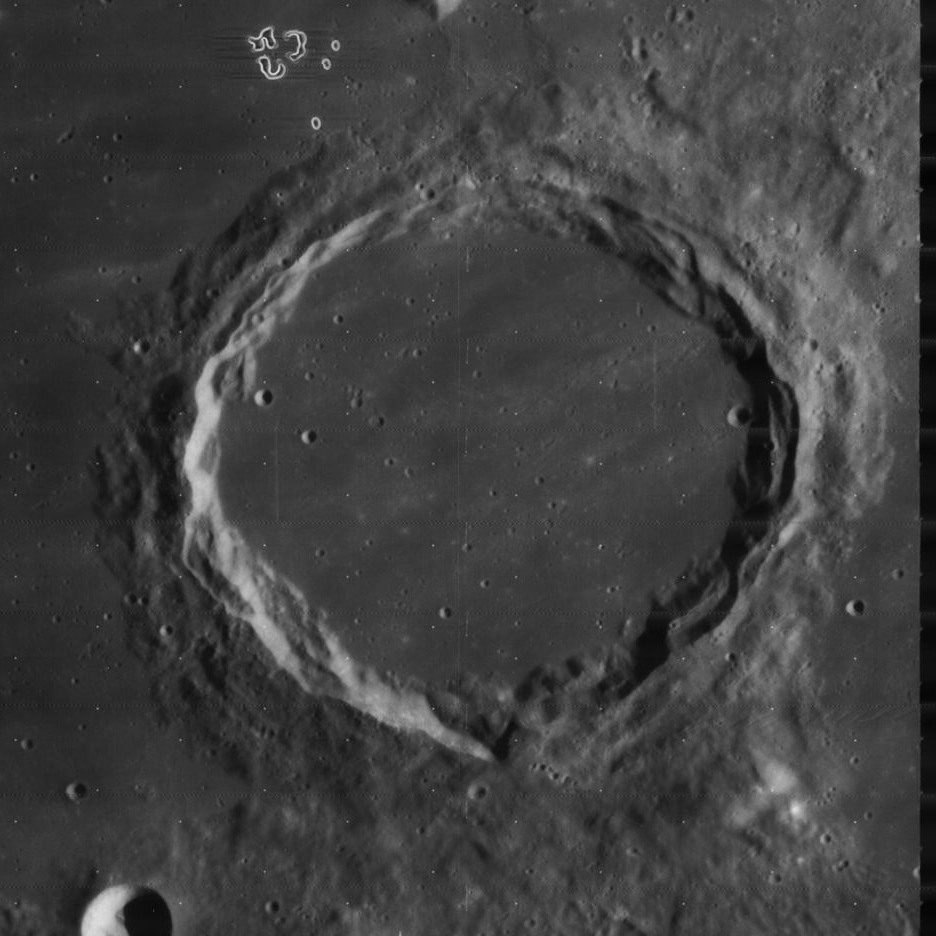
Lunar Orbiter 4 image

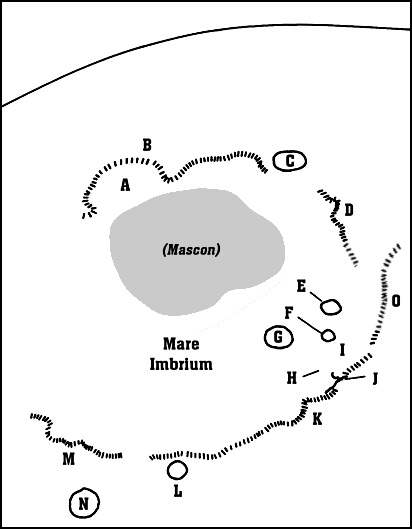
Detail map of Mare Imbrium's features. Archimedes is the feature marked "G".

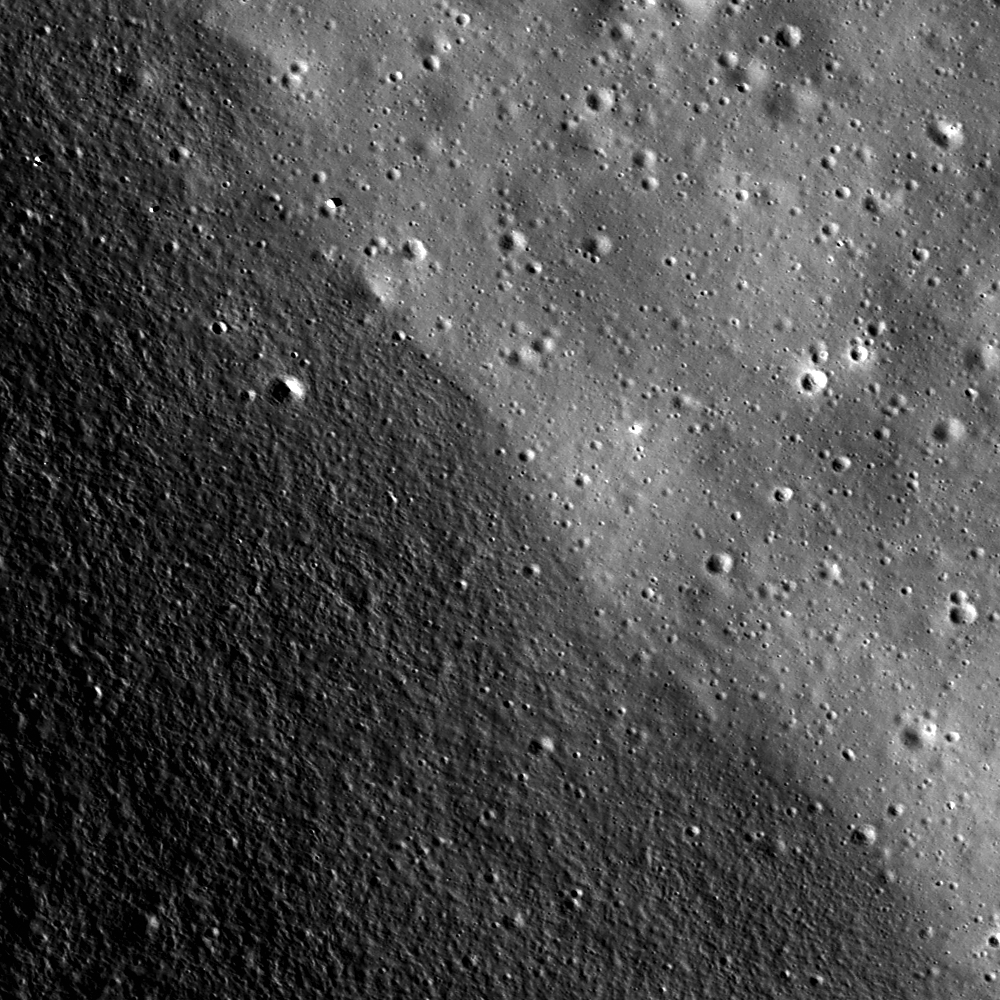
LRO image of the contact of the crater wall (lower left) and the floor (upper right)

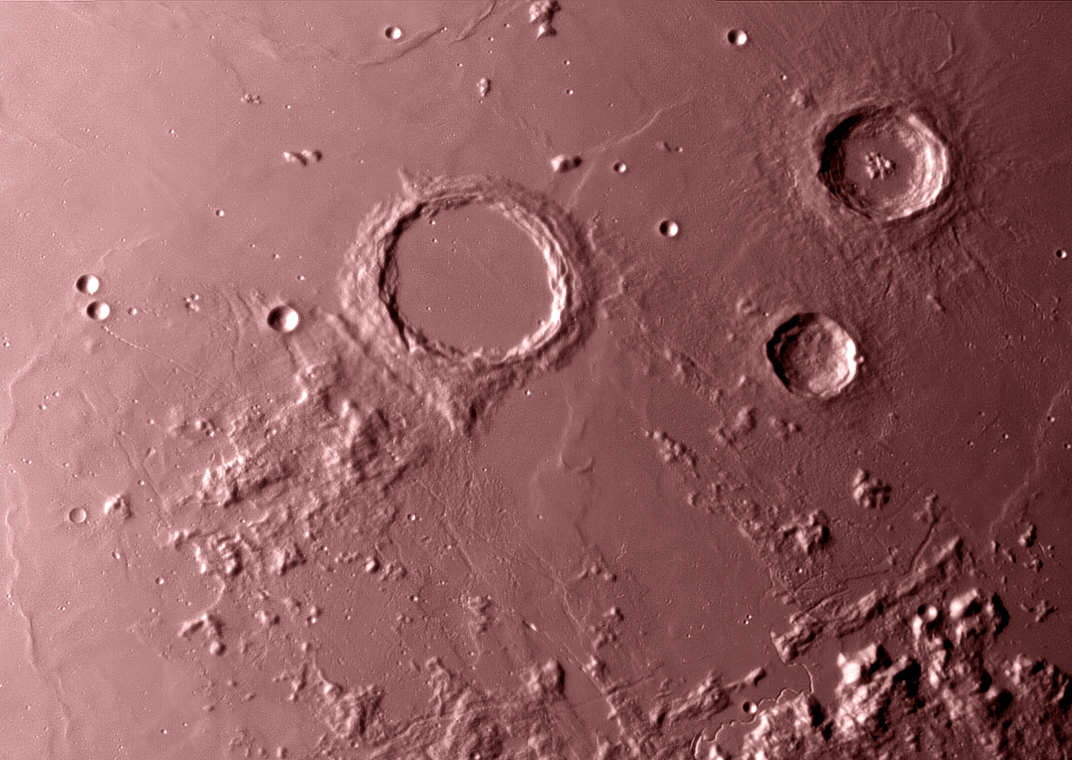
Lunar crater Archimedes in the infrared. Image courtesy of NOT and SO: M. Gålfalk, G. Olofsson, and H.-G. Florén, taken with the SIRCA camera.
