= Bancroft point =

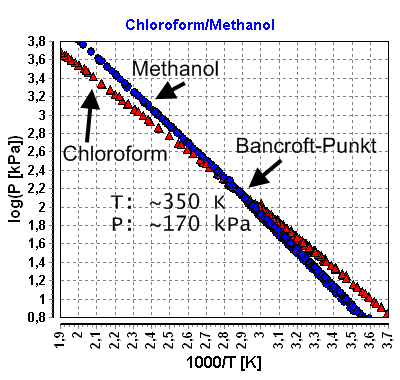
Graph showing Bancroft point of Methanol/Chloroform

A Bancroft point is the temperature where an azeotrope occurs in a binary system. Although vapor liquid azeotropy is impossible for binary systems which are rigorously described by Raoult's law, for real systems, azeotropy is inevitable at temperatures where the saturation vapor pressure of the components are equal. Such a temperature is called a Bancroft point. However, not all azeotropic binary systems exhibit such a point. Also, a Bancroft point must lie in the valid temperature ranges of the Antoine equation.

Bancroft point is named after Wilder Dwight Bancroft.

== See also ==
- Raoult's law
- Vapor–liquid equilibrium
- Bancroft rule
