= Bancroft rule =

Rule that distinguishes continuous phases from dispersed phases of colloids

The Bancroft rule in colloidal chemistry states: "The phase in which an emulsifier is more soluble constitutes the continuous phase." This means that water-soluble surfactants tend to give oil-in-water emulsions and oil-soluble surfactants give water-in-oil emulsions. It is a general rule of thumb, still used, but regarded as inferior to HLD theory (Hydrophilic Lipophilic Difference), which takes many more factors into consideration.

It was named after Wilder Dwight Bancroft, an American physical chemist, who proposed the rule in the 1910s.

== Technical details ==
In all of the typical emulsions, there are tiny particles (discrete phase) suspended in a liquid (continuous phase). In an oil-in-water emulsion, oil is the discrete phase, while water is the continuous phase.

What the Bancroft rule states is that contrary to common sense, what makes an emulsion oil-in-water or water-in-oil is not the relative percentages of oil or water, but which phase the emulsifier is more soluble in. So even though there may be a formula that's 60% oil and 40% water, if the emulsifier chosen is more soluble in water, it will create an oil-in-water system.

There are some exceptions to Bancroft's rule, but it's a very useful rule of thumb for most systems.

The hydrophilic-lipophilic balance (HLB) of a surfactant can be used in order to determine whether it's a good choice for the desired emulsion or not.

- In oil-in-water emulsions – use emulsifying agents that are more soluble in water than in oil (High HLB surfactants).
- In water-in-oil emulsions – use emulsifying agents that are more soluble in oil than in water (Low HLB surfactants).

Bancroft's rule suggests that the type of emulsion is dictated by the emulsifier and that the emulsifier should be soluble in the continuous phase. This empirical observation can be rationalized by considering the interfacial tension at the oil-surfactant and water-surfactant interfaces.

== See also ==
- Azeotrope
- Bancroft point
