= Luna 2 =

1959 Soviet uncrewed space mission to impact the surface of the Moon

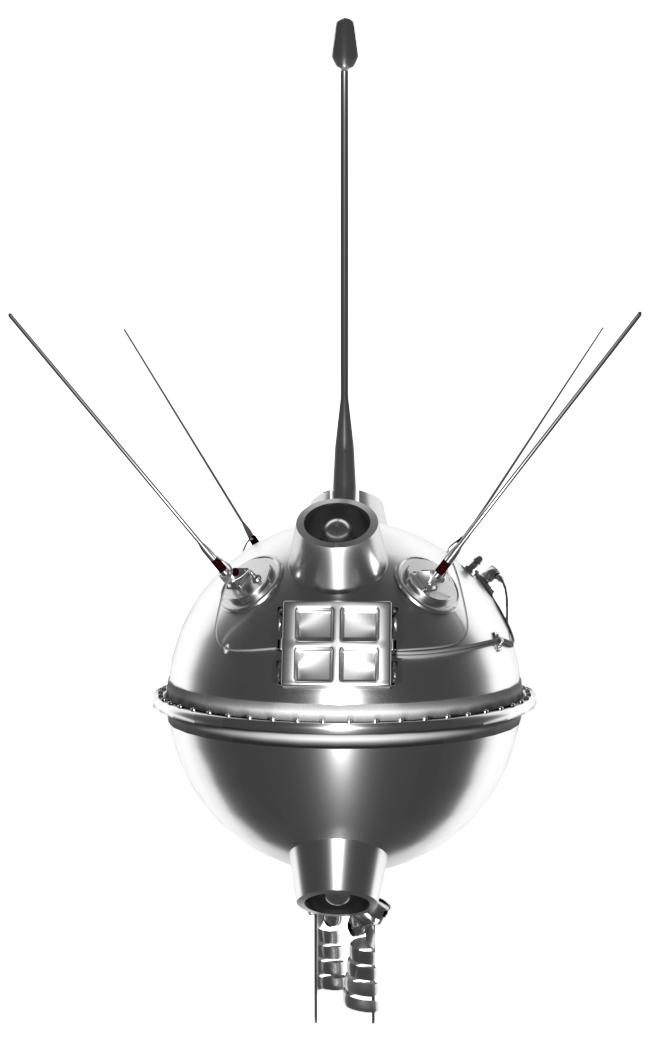
- Model of Luna 2
- Names: Second Soviet Cosmic Rocket; Lunik 2
- Mission type: Lunar impactor
- Operator: Soviet space program
- Harvard designation: 1959 ξ 1
- COSPAR ID: 1959-014A
- SATCAT no.: 00114
- Mission duration: 2 days, 14 hours, 22 minutes, 41 seconds (Note: There are widely-varying times given in sources for the launch, impact (e.g. 14th of September according to Moscow's time zone) and its mission duration.)

Spacecraft properties
- Manufacturer: OKB-1
- Launch mass: 390.2 kg

Start of mission
- Launch date: 12 September 1959; 06:39:42 GMT
- Rocket: Luna 8K72 s/n I1-7B
- Launch site: Baikonur, Site 1/5
- Contractor: OKB-1

Orbital parameters
- Epoch: 12 September 1959

Lunar impactor
- Impact date: 13 September 1959; 21:02:24 GMT
- Impact site: 29.1°N -0°E

Luna 2 (Russian: Луна 2), originally named the Second Soviet Cosmic Rocket and nicknamed Lunik 2 in contemporaneous media, was the sixth of the Soviet Union's Luna programme spacecraft launched to the Moon, E-1 No.7 (Е-1А № 7). It was the first spacecraft to touch the surface of the Moon, and the first human-made object to make contact with another celestial body.

The spacecraft was launched on 12 September 1959 by the Luna 8K72 s/n I1-7B rocket. It followed a direct path to the Moon. In addition to the radio transmitters sending telemetry information back to Earth, the spacecraft released a sodium vapour cloud so the spacecraft's movement could be visually observed. On 13 September 1959, it impacted the Moon's surface east of Mare Imbrium near the craters Aristides, Archimedes, and Autolycus.

Prior to impact, two sphere-shaped pennants with "USSR" and the launch date engraved in Cyrillic were detonated, sending pentagonal shields in all directions. Luna 2 did not detect radiation or magnetic belts around the Moon.

== Background ==
Luna 1 and the three spacecraft of Luna programme before it were part of the Ye-1 series of spacecraft with a mass of 156 kilograms (344 lb). Luna missions that failed to successfully launch or achieve good results remained unnamed and were not publicly acknowledged. The first unnamed probe exploded on launch on 23 September 1958. Two more launches were unsuccessfully attempted on 11 October 1958 and 4 December 1958. Luna 1 was the fourth launch attempt and the first partial success of the program. It launched on 2 January 1959 and missed the Moon by 5,965 kilometres (3,706 mi).

One mission separated Luna 1 and Luna 2, a launch failure that occurred with an unnamed probe on 18 June 1959. Luna 2 would be the Soviet Union's sixth attempt to impact the Moon. It was the second of the Ye-1a series, modified to carry a heavier payload of 156 kilograms (344 lb) and had a combined mass of 390.2 kilograms (860 lb). Luna 2 was similar in design to Luna 1, a spherical space probe with protruding antennas and instrumentation. The instrumentation was also similar to Luna 1, which included a triaxial fluxgate magnetometer, a piezoelectric detector, a scintillation counter, ion traps and two gas-discharge counters, while the Luna 2 included six gas-discharge counters. There were no propulsion systems on Luna 2 itself.

== Payload ==
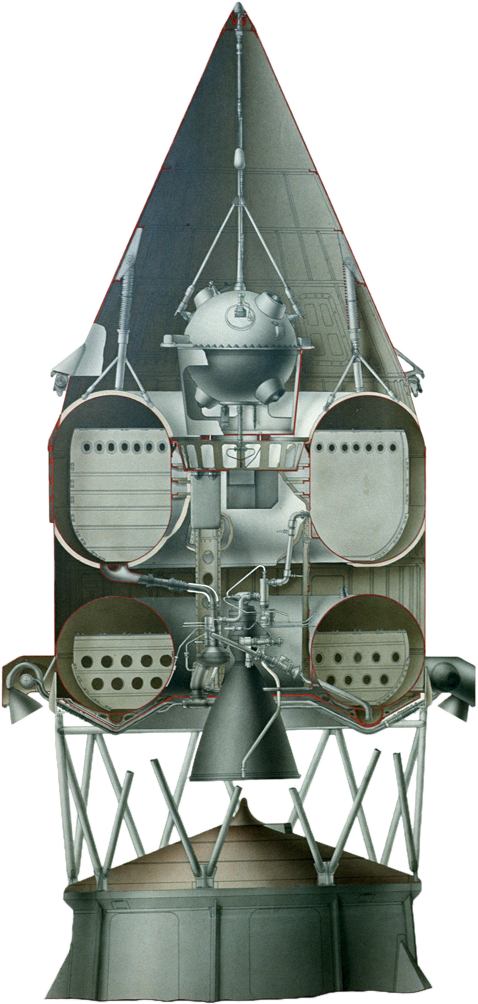
Upper stage of Luna rocket

Luna 2 carried five different types of instruments to conduct various tests while it was on its way to the Moon. The scintillation counters were used to measure any ionizing radiation and the Cherenkov radiation detectors to measure electromagnetic radiation caused by charged particles. The primary scientific purpose of the Geiger Counter carried on Luna 2 was to determine the electron spectrum of the Van Allen radiation belt. It consisted of three STS-5 gas-discharge counters mounted on the outside of an airtight container. The last instrument on Luna 2 was a three component fluxgate magnetometer. It was similar to that used on Luna 1 but its dynamic range was reduced by a factor of 4 to ±750 gammas (nT) so that the quantisation uncertainty was ±12 gammas. The probe's instrumentation was powered by silver-zinc and mercury-oxide batteries.

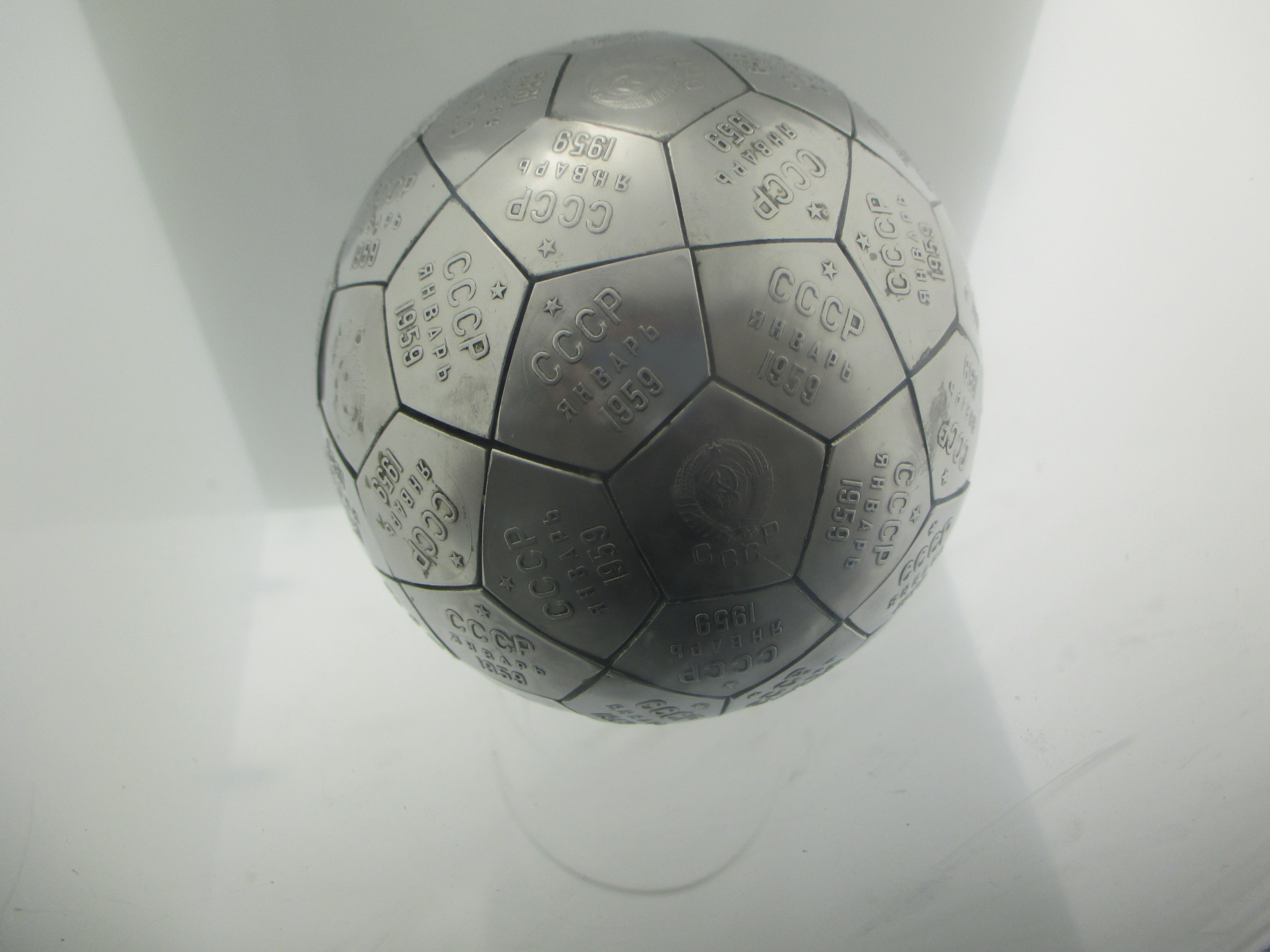
A copy of the Soviet pennant sent on the Luna 2 probe to the Moon, at the Kansas Cosmosphere. This one has the date “January 1959” in Cyrillic.

The spacecraft also carried Soviet pennants which were located on the probe and on the Luna 2 rocket. The two sphere-shaped pennants in the probe had surfaces covered by 72 pentagonal elements in a pattern similar to that later used by association footballs. In the centre was an explosive charge designed to shatter the sphere, sending the pentagonal shields in all directions. Each pentagonal element was made of titanium alloy; the centre regular pentagon had the State Emblem of the Soviet Union with the Cyrillic letters СССР ("USSR") engraved below and was surrounded by five non-regular pentagons which were each engraved with СССР СЕНТЯБРЬ 1959 ("USSR SEPTEMBER 1959"). The third pennant was similar engravings on aluminium strips which were embossed on the last stage of the Luna 2 rocket.

The scientists took extra, unspecified precautions in preventing biological contamination of the Moon.

== Mission ==
=== Launch and trajectory ===
There was difficulty getting Luna 2 ready for launch. The first attempt on September 6 failed due to a loose electrical connection. A second attempt two days later also went awry when the core stage LOX tank failed to pressurize properly due to ice formation in a pressure sensing line. The ice plug was broken but the launch had to be called off again. By this point the RP-1 had been sitting in the propellant tanks for almost four days and there was the risk that it could start to paraffin-ize. The next attempt was made on September 9. Core and strap-on ignition began but the engines only reached 75% thrust. The launch was aborted and the RP-1 finally drained from the tanks. The DP-2 electrical switch had failed to send the command to open the engine valves to full throttle.The booster was removed from the pad and replaced with a different one, which was launched 12 September 1959, and Luna 2 lifted off at 06:39:42 GMT.

Later in the month, Soviet premier Nikita Khrushchev was visiting the United States. The US space program had had several recent setbacks including an on-pad explosion of an Atlas-Able rocket and a Jupiter missile that exploded just after launch and killed several mice it was intended to fly on a biological mission. US President Dwight Eisenhower, while meeting with Khrushchev, remarked that there had been a few failures of American rockets lately and asked if there had been similar problems in the Soviet space programme. Alluding to the abortive Luna 2 attempt two weeks earlier, Khrushchev replied that "We had a rocket we were going to launch, but it did not work correctly so they had to take it down and replace it with a different one."

Once the vehicle reached Earth's escape velocity, the upper stage was detached, allowing the probe to travel on its path to the Moon. Luna 2 pirouetted slowly, making a full rotation every 14 minutes, while sending radio signals at 183.6, 19.993 and 39.986 MHz. The probe started transmitting information back to Earth using three different transmitters. These transmitters provided precise information on its course, allowing scientists to calculate that Luna 2 would hit its mark on the Moon around 00:05 on 14 September (Moscow Time), which was announced on Radio Moscow.

Because of claims that information received from Luna 1 was fake, the Russian scientists sent a telex to astronomer Bernard Lovell at Jodrell Bank Observatory at the University of Manchester. Having received the intended time of impact, and the transmission and trajectory details, it was Bernard Lovell who confirmed the mission's success to outside observers. However, the American media were still skeptical of the data until Lovell was able to prove that the radio signal was coming from Luna 2 by showing the Doppler shift from its transmissions.

=== Lunar impact ===
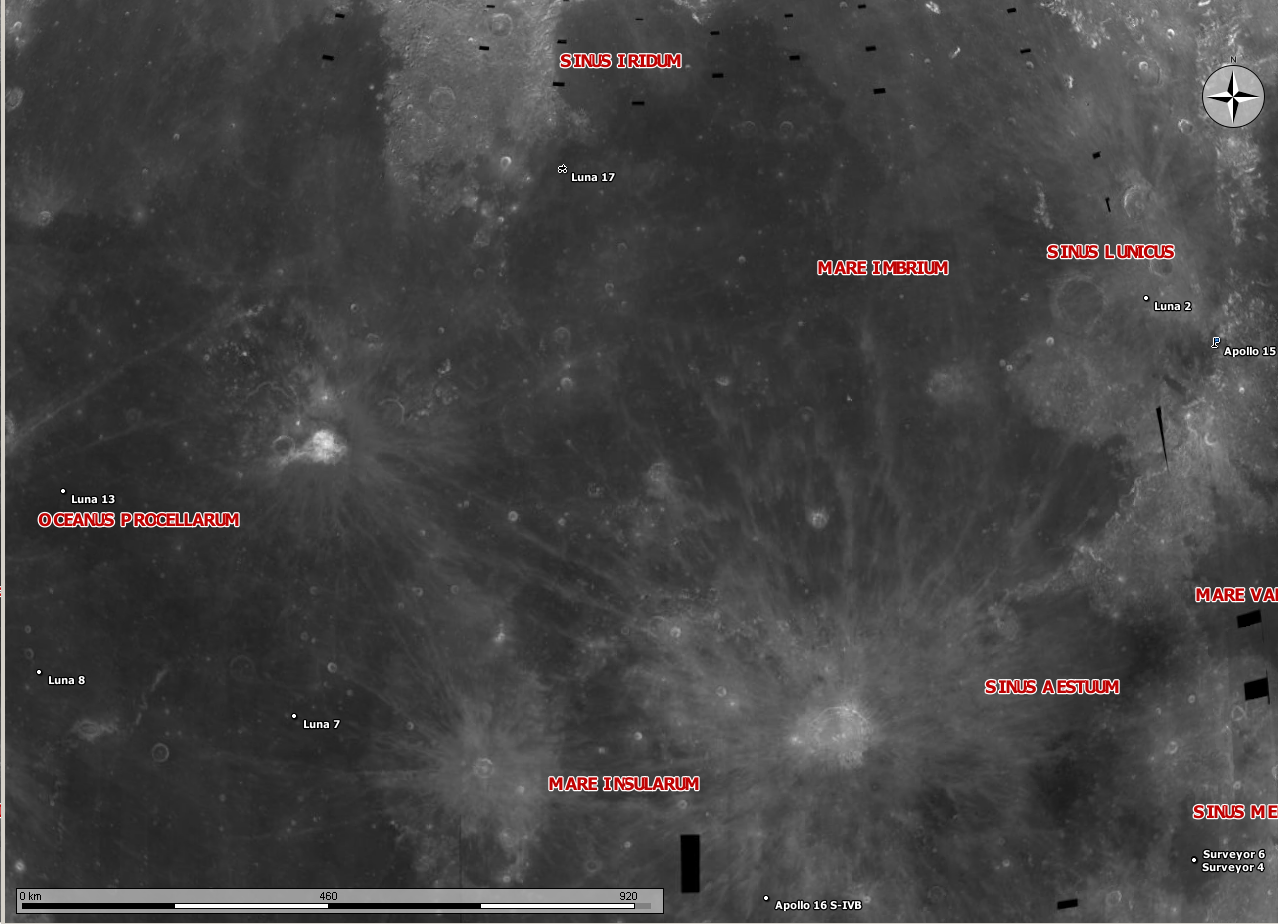
Luna 2 site is near the right of the image, relatively close to the Apollo 15 landing site.

Luna 2 took a direct path to the Moon, starting with an initial velocity from Earth of 11.2 kilometres per second (25,000 mph) and impacting the Moon at about 3.3 kilometres per second (7,400 mph). It hit the Moon about 0° west and 29.1° north of the centre of the visible disk at 00:02:24 (Moscow Time) on 14 September 1959. The probe became the first human-made object to hit another celestial body. To provide a display visible from Earth, on 13 September the spacecraft released a vapour cloud that expanded to a diameter of 650 kilometres (400 mi) that was seen by observatories in Alma Ata in Kazakhstan, Byurakan in Armenia, Abastumani and Tbilisi in Georgia, and Stalinabad in Tajikistan. This cloud also acted as an experiment to see how the sodium gas would act in a vacuum and zero gravity. The last stage of the rocket that propelled Luna 2 also hit the Moon's surface about 30 minutes after the spacecraft, but there was uncertainty about where it landed.

Bernard Lovell began tracking the probe about five hours before it struck the Moon and also recorded the transmission from the probe, which ended abruptly. He played the recording during a phone call to reporters in New York to finally convince most media observers of the mission's authenticity.

== Results ==
The radiation detectors and magnetometer were searching for lunar magnetic and radiation fields similar to the Van Allen radiation belt around Earth, sending information about once every minute until its last transmission which came about 55 kilometres (34 mi) away from the lunar surface. Although it did prove previous measurements of the Van Allen radiation belts that were taken from Luna 1 around the Earth, it was not able to detect any type of radiation belts around the Moon at or beyond the limits of its magnetometer's sensitivity (2–3 × 10^{−4} G).

Luna 2 showed time variations in the electron flux and energy spectrum in the Van Allen radiation belt. Using ion traps on board, the satellite made the first direct measurement of solar wind flux from outside the Earth's magnetosphere. On its approach to the lunar surface, the probe did not detect any notable magnetic field to within 55 kilometres (34 mi) from the Moon. It also did not detect a radiation belt around the Moon, but the four ion traps measured an increase in the ion particle flux at an altitude of 8,000 kilometres (5,000 mi), which suggested the presence of an ionosphere. The probe generated scientific data that was printed on 14 kilometres (8.7 mi) of teletype, which were analysed and published in the spring of 1960.

== Cultural significance ==
According to Donald William Cox, Americans were starting to believe that they were making progress in the Space Race and that although the Soviet Union might have had larger rockets, the United States had better guidance systems, but these beliefs were questioned when the Soviets were able to impact Luna 2 on the Moon. At that time the closest Americans had come to the Moon was about 60,000 kilometres (37,000 mi) with Pioneer 4. Soviet Premier Nikita Khrushchev, on his only visit to the United States, gave President Dwight D. Eisenhower a replica of the Soviet pennants that Luna 2 had just placed onto the lunar surface.

== U.S. espionage ==
In 1959, a Soviet exhibit of its economic achievements toured several countries. This exhibit included displays of Luna 2. The CIA conducted a covert operation to access it to gain information. A team of CIA officers gained 24 hours of unrestricted access to the display, which turned out to be a fully-operational system comparable to the original and not a replica as expected. The team disassembled the object, photographed the parts without removing it from its crate and then put it back in place, gaining intelligence regarding its design and capabilities. The Soviets did not find out, the CIA report being declassified in 2019, 28 years after the dissolution of the USSR.

== Legacy ==
Luna 2 was a success for the Soviets, and was the first in a series of missions (lunar impactors) that were intentionally crashed on the Moon. The later U.S.-made Ranger missions ended in similar impacts. Such controlled crashes have remained useful even after the technique of soft landing was mastered. NASA used hard spacecraft impacts to test whether shadowed Moon craters contain ice by analyzing the debris that was created on impact.

The pennant presented to Eisenhower is kept at the Eisenhower Presidential Library and Museum in Abilene, Kansas, U.S. A copy of the spherical pennant is located at the Kansas Cosmosphere in Hutchinson, Kansas.

On 1 November 1959, the Soviet Union released two stamps commemorating the spacecraft. They depict the trajectory of the mission.

== See also ==
- Soviet space program
- Sinus Lunicus
- List of artificial objects on the Moon
- List of missions to the Moon
