= Montes Archimedes =

Mountain range on the Moon

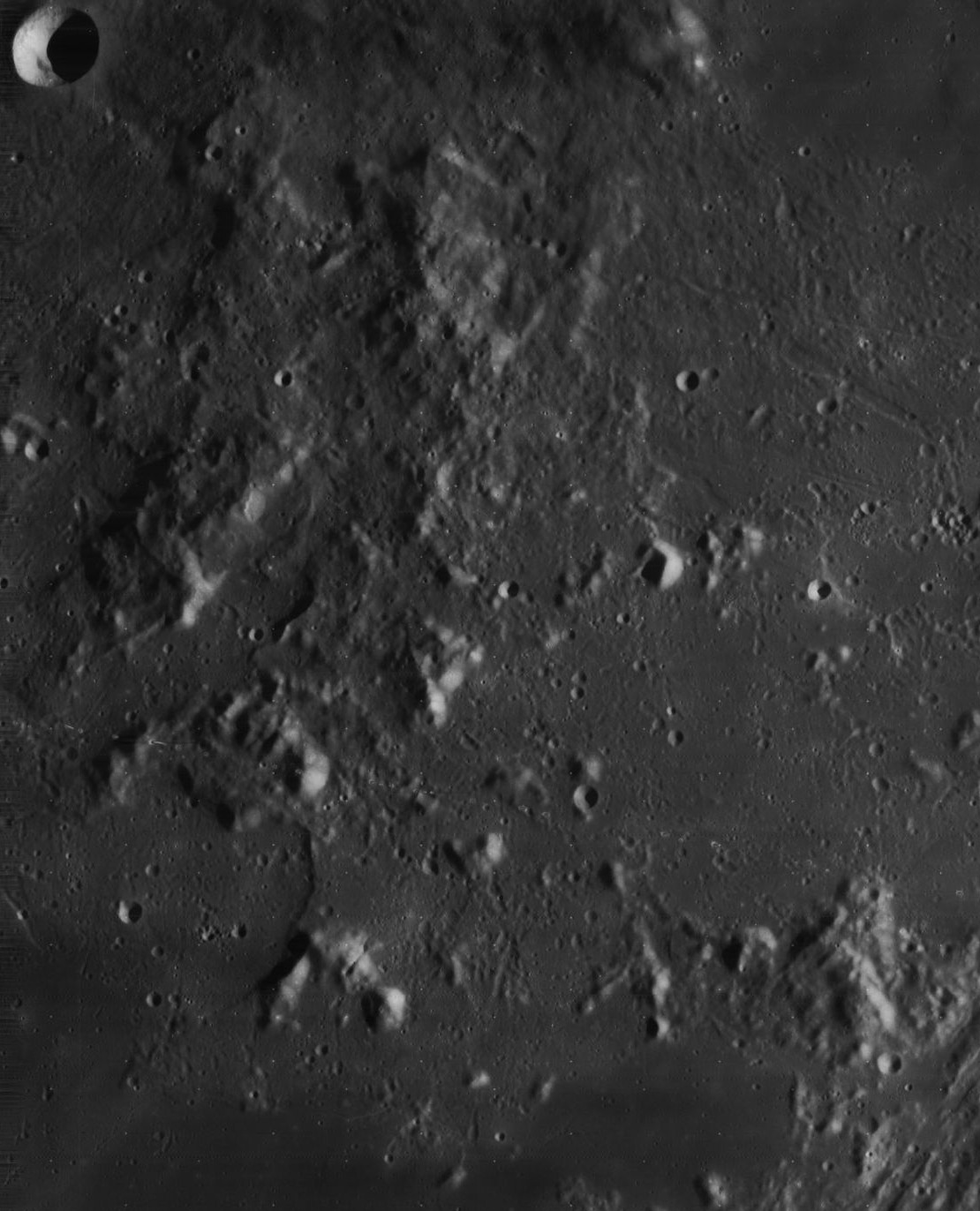
- Lunar Orbiter 4 image

Highest point
- Listing: Lunar mountains
- Coordinates: 25.3°N 4.6°W

Geography
- Location: the Moon

Montes Archimedes is a mountain range on the Moon. It is named after the nearby crater Archimedes, which in turn is named after the ancient Greek mathematician Archimedes.

This group of mountains is located on a plateau in the eastern part of the Mare Imbrium, a lunar mare in the northwest quadrant of the Moon's near side. They are bounded on the eastern side by the Palus Putredinis, a small mare, and to the north by Archimedes. Farther to the south and east lies the impressive Montes Apenninus, a long mountain range.

The selenographic coordinates of this range is 25.3° N, 4.6° W. The peaks of Montes Archimedes occupy an area with a maximum diameter of 163 km, although the most rugged portion of the terrain is concentrated within the central 70 km. The remainder of the peaks are scattered across the plateau, with no particular structure or pattern. Some of the peaks in this range achieve heights of up to 2.0 km, much less than those in the Montes Apenninus, for example, and none have received specific designations.
