= Autolycus (crater) =

Crater on the Moon

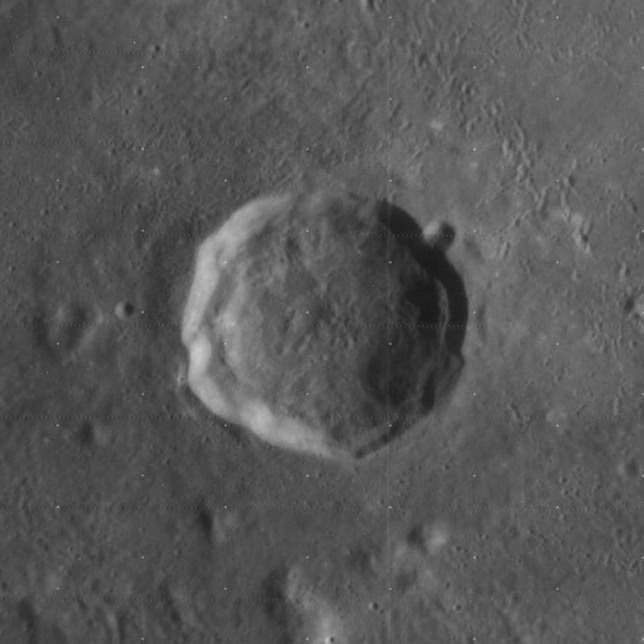
- Lunar Orbiter 4 image
- Coordinates: 30.7°N 1.5°E
- Diameter: 38.88 km (24.16 mi)
- Depth: 3.74 km (2.32 mi)
- Colongitude: 358° at sunrise
- Formation: Copernican or Eratosthenian
- Eponym: Autolycus

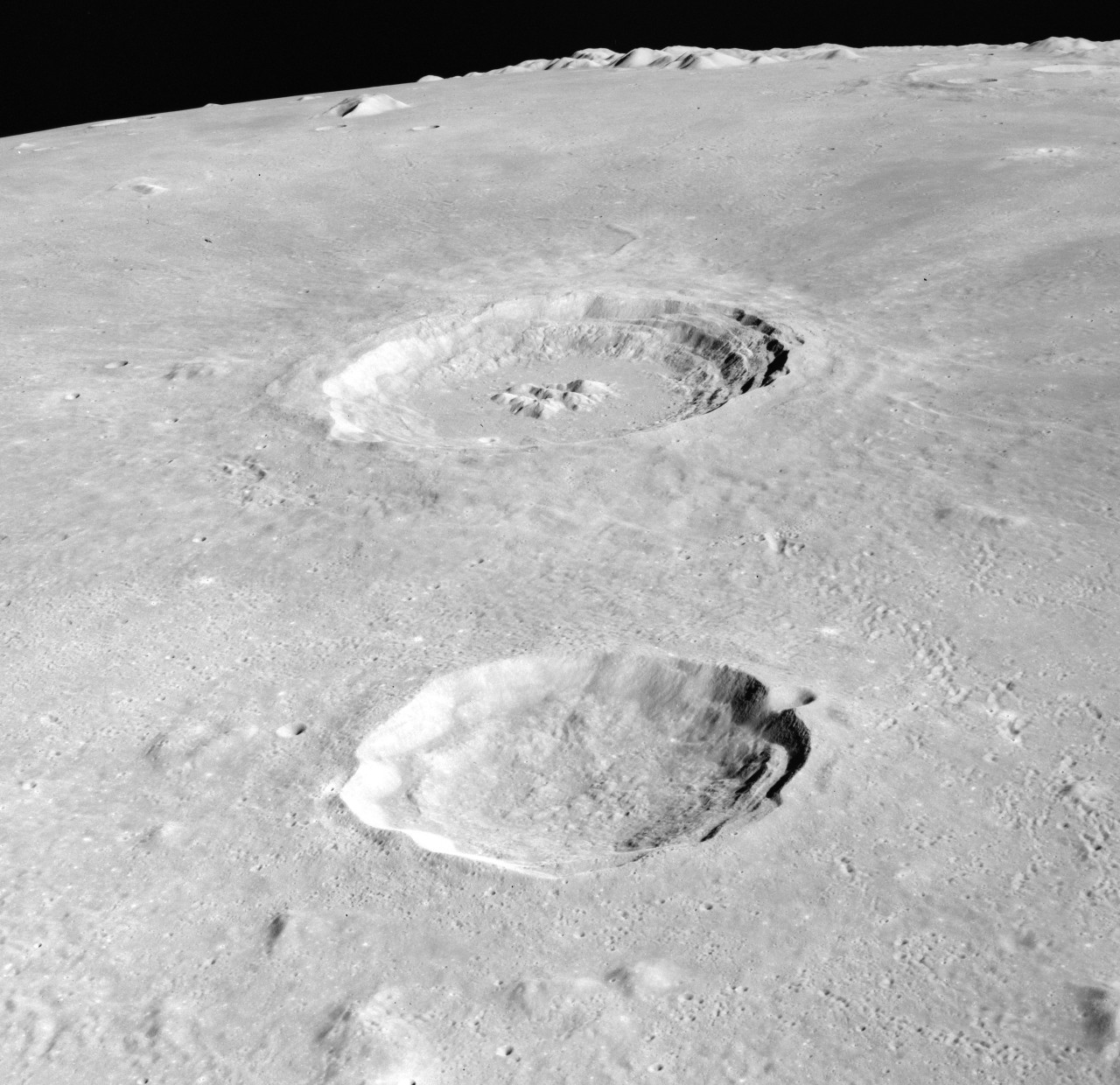
Autolycus (bottom) and Aristillus (top) from Apollo 15 Mapping camera.

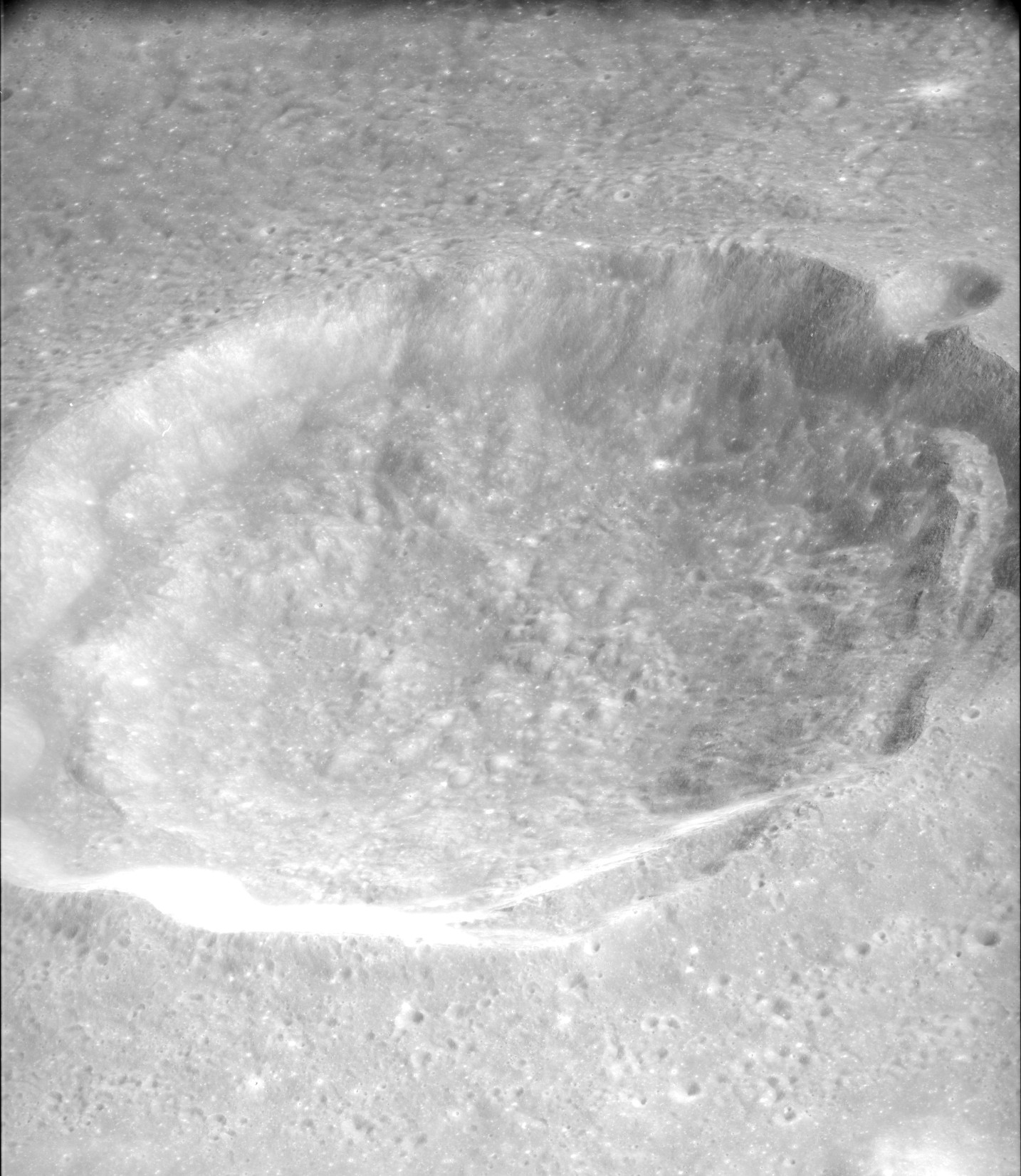
Oblique view of Autolycus from Apollo 15 Panoramic camera.

Autolycus is a lunar impact crater that is located in the southeast part of Mare Imbrium. T. W. Webb described it as having a similar outer blanket as Aristillus crater. Per Patrick Moore, "under a low sun radiating ridges can be made out extending from it". West of the formation is Archimedes, a formation more than double the size of Autolycus. Just to the north is Aristillus, and the outer ramparts of these two craters overlap in the intermediate stretch of the lunar mare.

This crater is named after the ancient Greek astronomer Autolycus of Pitane (fl. c. 310 B.C.). Its designation was officially adopted by the International Astronomical Union in 1935. The original name Autolicus was included in the lunar nomenclature of Italian selenographer Giovanni Riccioli in 1935.

== Description ==
The rim of Autolycus is somewhat irregular, although generally circular overall. It has a small outer rampart and an irregular interior with no central peak. The northeast rim is overlain by a small impact crater, Autolycus A.

Autolycus possesses a light ray system that extends for a distance of over 400 kilometers. Due to its rays, it is mapped as part of the Copernican System. However, dating of samples from the Apollo 15 landing site suggests an older age of 2.1 ga, which places it in the Eratosthenian period. Some of the ray material appears to overlay the flooded floor of Archimedes, and thus Autolycus is older than Archimedes. Aristillus (to the north), however, has rays that overlay both Autolycus and Archimedes, and thus it is the youngest of the three craters.

The first man-made impact upon the Moon was when the Luna 2 probe crash-landed just to the west-southwest of the crater rim on September 13, 1959, according to a Hungarian astronomer who claimed to see an explosion of dust.

== Satellite craters ==
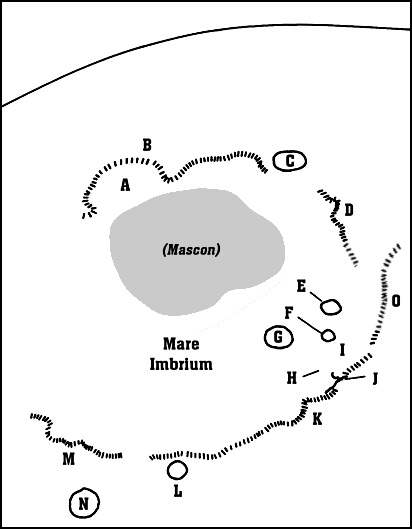
Detail map of Mare Imbrium's features. Autolycus is the feature marked "F".

By convention these features are identified on lunar maps by placing the letter on the side of the crater midpoint that is closest to Autolycus.

Autolycus	Latitude	Longitude	Diameter
A	30.9° N	2.2° E	4 km
K	31.2° N	5.4° E	3 km
