= Wilder Dwight Bancroft =

American physical chemist

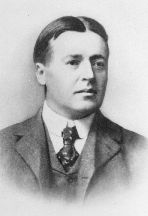
W.D. Bancroft

Wilder Dwight Bancroft (October 1, 1867 – February 7, 1953) was an American physical chemist.

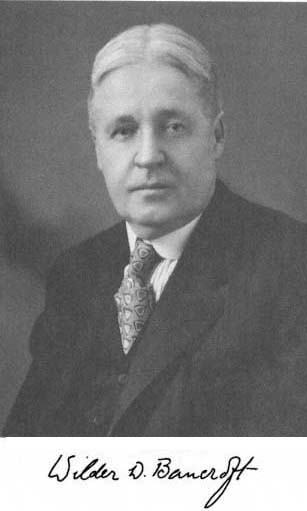
Wild Dwight Bancroft American physicochemist

== Biography ==
Born in Middletown, Rhode Island, he was the grandson of historian and statesman George Bancroft and great-grandson of Aaron Bancroft. He received a B.A. from Harvard University in 1888, and a Ph.D. from University of Leipzig in 1892, as well as honorary SCDs from Lafayette College (in 1919) and Cambridge University (in 1923).

He was an assistant chemistry instructor at Harvard University from 1888–1889 and 1893–1894, then a full instructor from 1894-1895. He then became an assistant professor at Cornell University in 1895, then a full professor (at Cornell) in 1903. He was elected a Fellow of the American Academy of Arts and Sciences in 1913, a Member of the American Philosophical Society in 1920, and was elected to the National Academy of Sciences in 1920.

Bancroft was trained by Wilhelm Ostwald and Jacobus Henricus van 't Hoff, and introduced a number of thermodynamic and colloid-chemical concepts into American physicochemistry. He is known for the Bancroft rule: a predominantly hydrophilic emulsifier stabilizes an oil-in-water emulsion, whereas a predominantly hydrophobic emulsifier stabilizes a water-in oil emulsion.

The lunar crater Bancroft is named in his honor.

His daughter, Mary Warner Bancroft (1896–1967), married another Cornell chemistry professor, Melvin Lorrel Nichols (1894–1981).

== Selected writings ==
- W. D. Bancroft (1913), Theory of emulsification, Journal of Physical Chemistry 17, 501 – 519.

== See also ==
- Bancroft rule
- Bancroft Point
