= Spurr (crater) =

Crater on the Moon

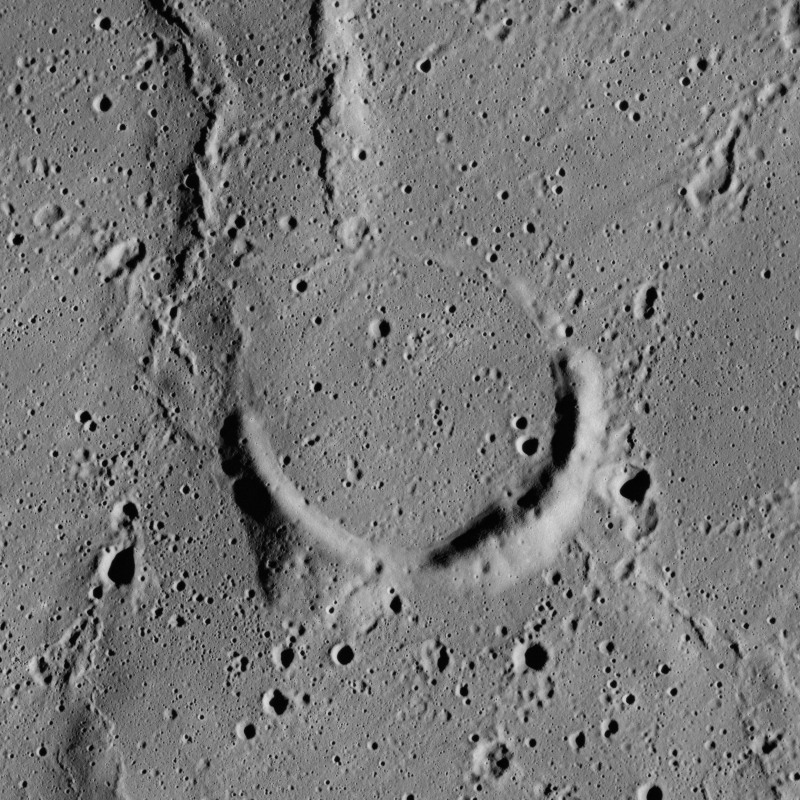
- Apollo 15 image
- Coordinates: 27.91°N 1.27°W
- Diameter: 13.21 km (8.21 mi)
- Depth: 0.3 km (0.19 mi)
- Colongitude: 1° at sunrise
- Formation: Imbrian
- Eponym: Josiah E. Spurr

Spurr is the lava-flooded remains of a lunar impact crater. It was named by the IAU in 1973 after American geologist Josiah Edward Spurr. It is located in the midst of the Palus Putredinis plain, to the southeast of the crater Archimedes. Only the southern half of the rim protrudes significantly through the lunar mare material, while the northern section of the wall has a resemblance to a ghost crater rim.

The formation was known as Archimedes K before being renamed by the IAU.
