= Montes Spitzbergen =

Mountain range on the Moon

Montes Spitzbergen (Latin)
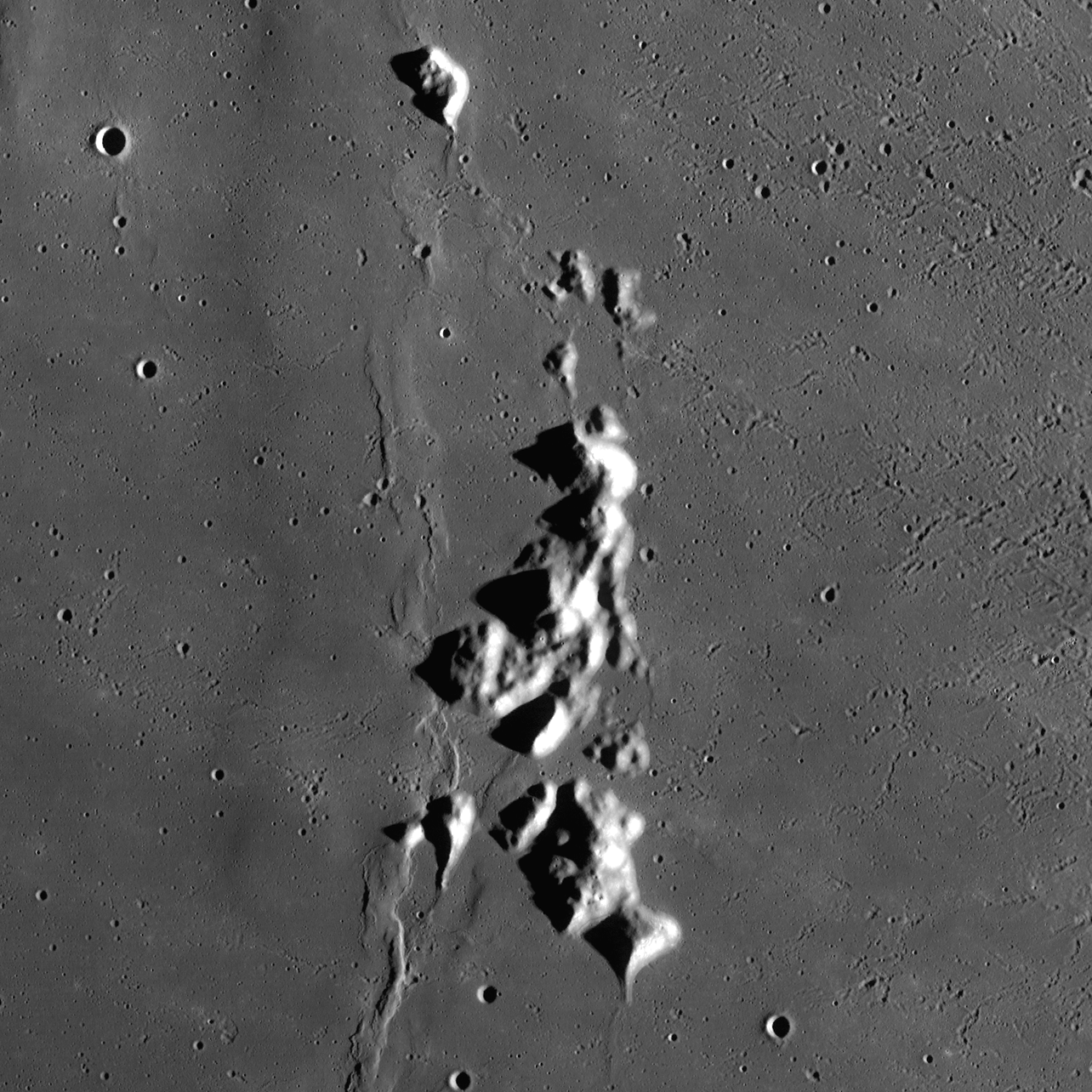
- Lunar Reconnaissance Orbiter image
- Location: the Moon
- Coordinates: 34.42°N 5.22°W

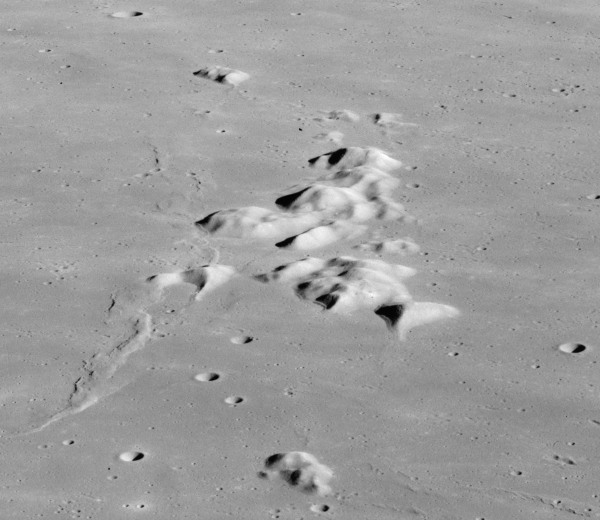
Oblique view from Apollo 15, facing north

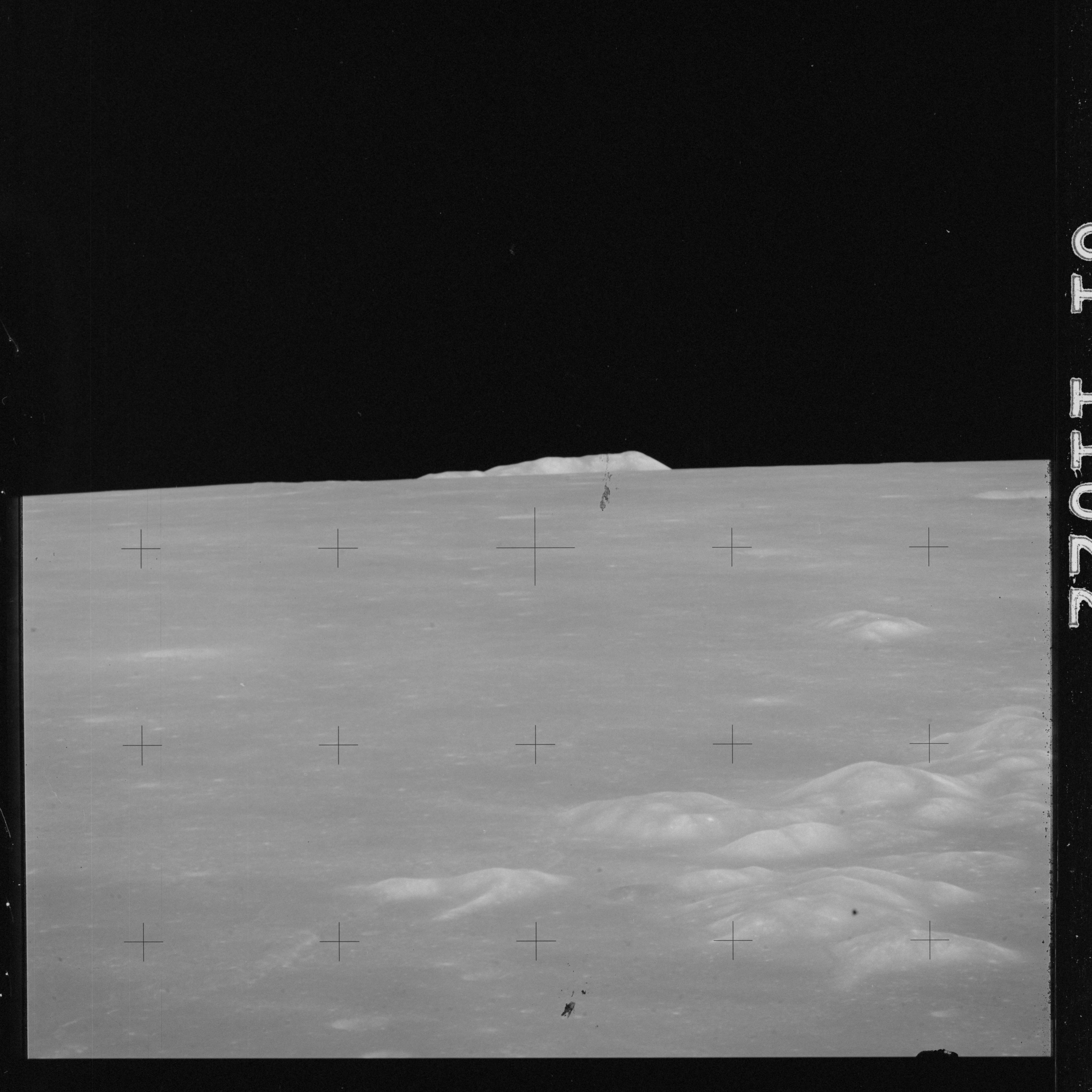
Another view from Apollo 15, with Mons Pico β on the horizon

The Montes Spitzbergen (Spitzbergen Mountains) is a solitary mountain chain in the eastern Mare Imbrium of the Moon. It is located about 80 km to the north of the flooded crater Archimedes. The range trends from south to north, consisting of a number of peaks separated by lava-flooded valleys, and has a maximum width of about 25 km. It is thought to be the surviving rim or inner ring of an impact crater that has been buried under magma flows.

The range was named by Mary Blagg for its resemblance to the jagged terrestrial mountains of the Spitzbergen island group. The name was approved by the International Astronomical Union in 1961.

== Satellite craters ==
By convention these features are identified on lunar maps by placing the letter on the side of the crater midpoint that is closest to Montes Spitzbergen.

| Spitzbergen | Latitude | Longitude | Diameter |
|---|---|---|---|
| A | 32.71° N | 7.1° W | 6.13 km |
| C | 32.88° N | 8.81° W | 6.27 km |
| D | 33.3° N | 8.76° W | 3.18 km |
