= Josiah Edward Spurr =

American geologist

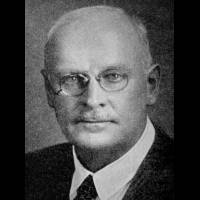
Josiah Edward Spurr, photo before 1932

Josiah Edward Spurr (1870–1950) was an American geologist, explorer, and writer.

== Biography ==
At Harvard, c. 1893

Josiah Edward Spurr was born in Gloucester, Massachusetts on October 1, 1870. He was considered something of a failure as a youth, unsuited for the family fishing business, since on a voyage he invariably became seasick. Since he could not be a productive fisherman like his brothers, his parents decided he might as well go to college. After working his way through Harvard, he began his career with the Minnesota Geological Survey, making the first-ever geological map of the great Mesabi Range in Minnesota.

J. E. Spurr led two expeditions of historic importance in Alaska for the United States Geological Survey in 1896 and 1898, made without the benefit of telephones, airplanes, the internal combustion engine, or electrical appliances. In 1896 he led the first expedition to map and chart the interior of Alaska, exploring the Yukon Territory, where gold had been discovered. In 1898 Spurr went down the length of the Kuskokwim River, naming as he traveled previously undiscovered mountains, mountain ranges, creeks, rivers, lakes and glaciers. At the end of the Kuskokwim expedition he made the first scientific observations of the Mount Katmai volcano, and the valley that later became known as the "Valley of Ten Thousand Smokes". During these expeditions he encountered Native Americans, Aleuts, traders, missionaries, prospectors, whiskey smugglers and various con artists. His books were seen as the definitive work on Alaskan minerals during the Alaska Gold Rush. They read like an adventure including the expedition's experiences with ice dams bearing down on them and lost provisions, as well as interactions with native Indians and missionaries.

After charting these regions, Spurr became the world's leading geological consultant, working for clients including the Sultan of Turkey, Bernard Baruch, and the Guggenheims. He was generally regarded as one of the world's foremost geologists, and probably the leader in the field of economic geology (the application of geology to mining). At the age of 68 he became interested in the origin of craters of the Moon, and published four books that made a major contribution to the field. His last book, Geology as applied to Selenology, published just a year before his death, has been criticised, but was influential in the new field. He was considered a superb and pithy writer.

He published well over a hundred articles in scientific journals, books and monographs, as well as poetry and books for a general audience. He has named after him, Mount Spurr, a very active volcano near Anchorage; Spurr crater on the Moon; and a mineral, spurrite. Many of his papers, correspondence and photographs are in the American Heritage Center of the University of Wyoming; others are preserved in the Anchorage office of the United States Geological Survey.

His children were Edward "Ted" Spurr, an entrepreneur; John Spurr, a publishing executive; William Alfred Spurr, Professor of Statistics at Stanford; Robert A. Spurr, professor of chemistry at the University of Maryland; and Stephen H. Spurr, an authority on forestry and forest ecology and former president of the University of Texas at Austin.

Josiah Edward Spurr died at his home in Winter Park, Florida on January 12, 1950.

There is a recent biography of him by Stephen J. Spurr, an economist who is his grandson.

== Selected publications ==
- Geology of the Aspen mining district (1898), Colorado: U.S. Geological Survey Mon. No. 31. XXXV, 260 p. and atlas.
- Through the Yukon Gold Diggings; a narrative of personal travel (1900): Boston, Eastern Publishing Co.
- Geology of the Tonopah mining district (1905), Nevada: U.S. Geological Survey Prof. Paper 42, 295 p. Abstract: Engineering and Mining Journal, v. 80, pp. 922–923.
- Political and commercial geology and the world's mineral resources; a series of studies by specialists (1920): New York, McGraw-Hill Book Co. (editor)
