= Moiseyev =

Moiseyev, Moiseev or Moisseev (Russian: Моисеев) is a Russian masculine last name. Its feminine counterpart is Moiseyeva, Moiseeva or Moisseeva.

Notable people with the surname—listed alphabetically by given name—include:

== Dance and music ==
- Boris Moiseev (1954–2022), Russian dancer
- Igor Moiseyev (1906–2007), Russian choreographer
- Olga Moiseeva, (1928–2021), Soviet and Russian ballerina and teacher
- Roman Moiseyev (born 1960), Russian conductor

== Military ==
- Aleksandr Alekseyevich Moiseyev (born 1962), Russian naval officer
- Mikhail Moiseyev (1939–2022), Russian military officer

== Science ==
- Evgeny Moiseev (1948–2022), Russian mathematician
- Ilya Moiseev (1929–2020), Russian chemist
- Nikolay Moiseev (born 1962), Russian spacesuit designer
- Nikolay Moiseyev (1902–1955), Russian astronomer
- Nikita Moiseyev (1917–2000), Russian mathematics theorist

== Sports ==
=== Football (soccer) ===
- Ihor Moiseyev (born 1964), Ukrainian footballer
- Kirill Moiseyev (born 2004), Russian footballer
- Maksim Moiseyev (born 1987), Belarusian footballer
- Maria Moiseeva, Uzbekistani football footballer
- Sergei Moiseyev (born 1959), Russian footballer
- Vladimir Moiseyev (footballer) (born 1988), Russian footballer
- Yuri Moiseyev (footballer) (born 1960), Russian football coach and former player

=== Other sports ===
- Aleksandr Moiseyev (basketball) (1927–2003), Russian basketball player
- Andrey Moiseyev (born 1979), Russian pentathlete
- Inna Moiseeva (born 1971), Russian rower
- Irina Moiseeva (born 1955), Russian ice dancer
- Gennady Moiseyev (1948–2017), Russian motocross racer
- Petr Moiseev (born 1986), Russian bobsledder
- Tatiana Moiseeva (born 1981), Russian biathlete
- Victoria Moiseeva (born 1991), Russian curler
- Vladimir Moiseyev (windsurfer) (born 1972), Russian windsurfer
- Yuri Moiseyev (ice hockey) (1940–2005), Russian ice hockey player

== Other ==
- Alex Moiseyev (born 1959), Russian-born American draughts champion
- Euthymius Moiseyev (born 1972), bishop of the Russian Orthodox Church
- Leonid Moiseyev (born 1948), Russian diplomat

== Other uses ==
- Igor Moiseyev Ballet, a dance troupe focusing on character dance, based in Moscow, Russia
- Moiseev (crater), a lunar impact crater on the Moon
- Moiseyeva Gora, a settlement in Karachevsky District, Bryansk Oblast, Russia
