= Luiz Henrique =

Luiz Henrique may refer to:

== Footballers ==
- Luiz Henrique Rosa (1938–1985), Brazilian footballer and musician
- Luiz Henrique (footballer, born 1943), full name Luiz Henrique Ferreira de Menezes, Brazilian football manager and midfielder
- Luiz Henrique (footballer, born 1949), full name Luiz Henrique Byron de Mello, Brazilian footballer
- Luiz Henrique (footballer, born 1981), full name Luiz Henrique da Silva Alves, Brazilian football forward
- Luiz Henrique (footballer, born 1982), full name Luiz Henrique de Souza Santos, Brazilian football defender
- Luiz Henrique Tosta (born 1985), Brazilian football defender
- Luiz Henrique (footballer, born 1985), full name Luiz Henrique de Oliveira, Brazilian football attacking midfielder
- Luiz Henrique (footballer, born 1992), full name Luiz Henrique Sales de Souza (1992–2005), Brazilian football midfielder
- Luiz Henrique (footballer, born 1997), Brazilian football midfielder
- Luiz Henrique (footballer, born 1998), full name Luiz Henrique dos Santos Júnior, Brazilian football left-back
- Luiz Henrique (footballer, born March 1999), Brazilian football midfielder
- Luiz Henrique (footballer, born May 1999), Brazilian football midfielder
- Luiz Henrique (footballer, born 2001), Brazilian football forward

== Politicians ==
- Luiz Henrique da Silveira (1940–2015), Brazilian politician and lawyer
- Luiz Henrique Mandetta (born 1964), Brazilian doctor and politician

== See also ==
- Luís Henrique (disambiguation)
- Luis Enrique (disambiguation)
