= Luis Enrique (disambiguation) =

Luis Enrique (born 1970) is a Spanish football manager and former player.

Luis Enrique or Luís Enrique may also refer to:

- Enrique Fernández (director) (born 1953 as Luis Enrique Fernández Marta), Uruguayan film director
- Luis Capurro (Luis Enrique Capurro Bautista, born 1961), Ecuadorian footballer
- Luis Cessa (Luis Enrique Cessa, born 1992), Mexican baseball player
- Luis Enrique (singer) (born 1962), Nicaraguan salsa singer
- Luis Enrique Benítez Ojeda (born 1969), Mexican politician
- Luis Enrique Bracamontes (1923–2003), Mexican politician and engineer
- Luis Enrique Cálix (born 1965), Honduran footballer
- Luis Enrique Camejo (born 1971), Cuban contemporary painter
- Luis Enrique Delgado (born 1980), Colombian footballer
- Luis Enrique Erro (1897–1955), Mexican astronomer, politician, and educational reformer
  - Planetario Luis Enrique Erro, planetarium located in Mexico City named after the latter
- Luis Enrique Fernández (born 1951), Mexican footballer
- Luis Enrique Ferrer García, Cuban dissident
- Luis Enrique Fierro (born 1936), Ecuadorian medic and poet
- Luis Enrique González (born 1997), Mexican footballer
- Luis Enrique Hernández (born 1996), Mexican footballer
- Luis Enrique Juliá, Puerto Rican composer and guitarist
- Luis Enrique Martínez (musician), (c. 1923–1995), Colombian musician and songwriter
- Luis Enrique Mena (born 1992), Colombian footballer
- Luis Enrique Méndez (born 1973), Cuban wrestler
- Luis Enrique Mercado (born 1952), Mexican politician
- Luis Enrique Muñoz (born 1988), Mexican footballer
- Luis Enrique Peñalver (born 1996), Spanish badminton player
- Luis Enrique Porozo (born 1990), Ecuadorian boxer
- Luis Enrique Quiñones (born 1991), Colombian footballer
- Luis Enrique Robles (born 1986), Mexican footballer
- Luis Enrique Sam Colop (1955–2011), Guatemalan/Native American linguist, lawyer, poet, writer, newspaper columnist and social activist
- Luis Enrique Vergara (1922–1970), Mexican screenwriter and producer
- Luis Enrique Yarur Rey (born c. 1951), Chilean heir and banker
- Luis Herrera (tennis) (Luis Enrique Herrera, born 1971), Mexican tennis player
- Luis Lemus (Luis Enrique Lemus Dávila, born 1992), Mexican cyclist
- Luis Marmentini (Luis Enrique Marmentini Gil), Chilean basketball player
- Luis Medrano (Luis Enrique Medrano Toj, born 1976), Guatemalan weightlifter
- Luis Zayas (athlete) (Luis Enrique Zayas Fernández, born 1997), Cuban high jumper
- Neco Martínez (Luis Enrique Martínez, born 1982), Colombian footballer

== See also ==
- Luís Henrique (disambiguation)
