= Ginzel =

Ginzel may refer to:

- Ginzel (crater) a crater on the far side of the Moon
- Friedrich Karl Ginzel (1850–1926), an Austrian astronomer
- Jones/Ginzel an American artist team
