= Luis Muñoz =

Luis Muñoz may refer to:

- Luis Muñoz de Guzmán (1735–1808), Spanish colonial administrator
- Luis Muñoz Rivera (1859–1916), Puerto Rican poet, journalist and politician
  - Luis Muñoz Rivera Park, Puerto Rican park named after the politician
  - Luis Muñoz Rivera (Ponce statue), Puerto Rican statue of the politician
  - Casa Natal de Luis Muñoz Rivera cultural and historical building where the politician was born
- Luis Muñoz Moyano (1894–?), Chilean politician
- Luis Muñoz Marín (1898–1980), Puerto Rican journalist, activist and politician
  - Luis Muñoz Marín International Airport, Puerto Rican airport named after the politician
  - Ruta Panorámica Luis Muñoz Marín, network of roads named after the politician
  - Retrato de Luis Muñoz Marín (1977) oil painting of the politician
- Luis Muñoz Monje (1900–1990), Chilean politician
- Luis Muñoz Rivera (senator) (1916–2006), Puerto Rican senator
- Luis Muñoz (bobsledder) (1928–1989), Spanish Olympic bobsledder
- Luis Muñoz (boxer) (born 1947), Chilean Olympic boxer
- Luis Jacinto Muñoz (born 1953), Costa Rican jazz percussionist
- Luis Muñoz (poet) (born 1966), Spanish poet
- Luis Enrique Muñoz (born 1988), Mexican-born footballer
- Luis Muñoz (footballer, born 1997), Spanish football midfielder
- Luis Muñoz (footballer, born 2011), English football midfielder
