= Vladimir Moiseyev =

Vladimir Moiseyev may refer to:

- Vladimir Moiseyev (footballer) (born 1988), Russian footballer
- Vladimir Moiseyev (windsurfer), Russian windsurfer
