= Zasyadko =

Zasyadko may refer to:

- Alexander Dmitrievich Zasyadko (1779–1837), Russian rocket gunner
- Zasyadko (crater), a crater on the Moon
- Zasyadko coal mine, a coal mine in Donetsk, Ukraine
- 2007 Zasyadko mine disaster, a disaster that killed 101 miners
