= Harry Babcock =

Harry Babcock may refer to:

- Harry Babcock (pole vaulter) (1890–1965), American pole vaulter
- Harry Babcock (American football) (1930–1996), American football end

== See also ==
- Harold D. Babcock (1882–1968), American astronomer
