= Bibliography of water clocks =

This is a bibliography of water clocks.

== Overview of water clocks and other time instruments ==
- Barnett, Jo Ellen (1998). Time's Pendulum: From Sundials to Atomic Clocks, the Fascinating History of Timekeeping and How Our Discoveries Changed the World. New York: Plenum Press. ISBN 0-15-600649-9.
- Bruton, Eric (1979). The History of Clocks and Watches. Rizzoli. ISBN 0-8478-0261-2.
- Cowan, Harrison J. (1958). Time and Its Measurement: From the stone age to the nuclear age. Ohio: The World Publishing Company. Bibcode:1958tmfs.book.....C.
- Dohrn-van Rossum, Gerhard (1996). History of the Hour: Clocks and Modern Temporal Orders. Translated by Dunlap, Thomas. The University of Chicago Press. ISBN 0-226-15510-2. OCLC 33440282.
- Higgins, K.; Miner, D.; Smith, C.N.; Sullivan, D.B. (2004). "A Walk Through Time (version 1.2.1)". Gaithersburg, MD: National Institute of Standards and Technology.
- Jespersen, James; Fitz-Randolph, Jane (1999). From Sundials to Atomic Clocks: Understanding Time and Frequency (Second revised ed.). Courier Corporation. ISBN 0-486-40913-9.
- King, David A. (July 2004). "Towards a History from Antiquity to the Renaissance of Sundials and Other Instruments for Reckoning Time by the Sun and Stars". Annals of Science. 61 (3): 375–388. doi:10.1080/00033790310001642795..
- Landes, D (1983). Revolution in Time. Harvard University Press.
- McNown, J.S. (1976). "When Time Flowed: The Story of the Clepsydra". La Houille Blanche. 62 (5): 347–353. Bibcode:1976LHBl...62..347M. doi:10.1051/lhb/1976021. ISSN 0018-6368.
- Milham, Willis I. (1945). Time & Timekeepers including The History, Construction, Care, and Accuracy of Clocks and Watches. New York: The Macmillan Company.
- Rees, Abraham (1970). Rees's Clocks, Watches, and Chronometers 1819–20. Charles E. Tuttle Company.
- Richards, E.G. (1998). Mapping Time: The Calendar and Its History. Oxford University Press.
- Toulmin, Stephen; Goodhead, J. (1999). The Discovery of Time. University of Chicago Press. ISBN 0-226-80842-4.
- Turner, Anthony J. (1984). The Time Museum. Vol. I: Time Measuring Instruments, Part 3: Water-clocks, Sand-glasses, Fire-clocks. Rockford, IL: The Museum. ISBN 0-912947-01-2. OCLC 159866762.

== Arabic & Islamic water clocks ==
- Hill, Donald Routledge, ed. (1976). Archimedes' On the Construction of Water-Clocks. Paris: Turner & Devereux.
- Hill, D.R. (1981). Arabic Water–Clocks. Syria: University of Aleppo.
- al-Hassan, Ahmad Y.; Hill, Donald R. (1986). Islamic Technology: An Illustrated History. Cambridge University Press. ISBN 0-521-26333-6. OCLC 13332728.
- Hill, Donald Routledge (1998). Studies in Medieval Islamic Technology: From Philo to Al-Jazari - from Alexandria to Diyar Bakr. Collected Studies Series 555. Aldershot, England: Ashgate. ISBN 978-0860786061.
- King, David A. (1990). "'Mikat', Astronomical Timekeeping". The Encyclopaedia of Islam. Vol. 7. Brill. (Reprinted in King, David A (1993). "Chapter V". Astronomy in the Service of Islam Variorum.)

== Babylonian water clocks ==
- Englund, R.K. (1988). "Administrative Timekeeping in Ancient Mesopotamia" (PDF). Journal of the Economic and Social History of the Orient. XXXI (31): 121–185. doi:10.1163/156852088X00070.
- Fermor, John; Steele, John M. (July 2000). "The design of Babylonian waterclocks: Astronomical and experimental evidence". Centaurus. 42 (3): 210–222. Bibcode:2000Cent...42..210F. doi:10.1034/j.1600-0498.2000.420303.x.
- Høyrup, J. (1997–1998). "A Note on Waterclocks and the Authority of Texts" (PDF). Archiv für Orientforschung. 44/45: 192–194.
- Michel-Nozières, C. (July 2000). "Second Millennium Babylonian Water Clocks: a physical study". Centaurus. 42 (3): 180–209. Bibcode:2000Cent...42..180M. doi:10.1034/j.1600-0498.2000.420302.x.
- Neugebauer, Otto (1947). "Studies in Ancient Astronomy. VIII. The Water Clock in Babylonian Astronomy". Isis. 37 (1/2): 37–43. doi:10.1086/347965. PMID 20247883. S2CID 120229480. (Reprinted in Neugebauer, Otto (1983). Astronomy and History: Selected Essays. pp. 239–245.)
- Price, Derek deSolla (1976). Science Since Babylon. New Haven: Yale University Press.
- Teresi, Dick (2002). Lost Discoveries: The Ancient Roots of Modern Science – from the Babylonians to the Maya. New York: Simon & Schuster.
- van der Waerden, Bartel Leendert (1951). "Babylonian Astronomy: III. The Earliest Astronomical Computations". Journal of Near Eastern Studies. 10: 20–34. doi:10.1086/371009. S2CID 222450259.

== Chinese water clocks ==
- Lorch, Richard P. (June 1981). "Al-Khazini's Balance-clock and the Chinese Steelyard Clepsydra". Archives Internationales d'Histoire des Sciences. 31: 183–189.
- Needham, Joseph; Ling, W.; de Solla Price, D.J. (1986). Heavenly Clockwork: The Great Astronomical Clocks of Medieval China (2nd ed.). CUP Archive. ISBN 0-521-32276-6.
- Needham, Joseph (1986). Science & Civilization in China: Volume 4, Physics and Physical Technology, Part 2, Mechanical Engineering. Taipei: Caves Books.
- Needham, Joseph (1995). Science & Civilisation in China: Volume 3, Mathematics and the Sciences of the Heavens and the Earth. Cambridge University Press. ISBN 0-521-05801-5. OCLC 153247126.
- Needham, Joseph (2000). Science & Civilisation in China: Volume 4, Physics and Physical Technology, Part 2, Mechanical Engineering. Cambridge University Press. ISBN 0-521-05803-1. OCLC 153247141.
- Quan, He Jun (November 13–16, 1985). "Research on scale and precision of the water clock in ancient China". In G. Swarup; A. K. Bag; K. S. Shukla (eds.). History of Oriental Astronomy. Proceedings of the International Astronomical Union Colloquium No. 91, New Delhi. Cambridge: Cambridge University Press (published 1987). pp. 57–61. ISBN 0-521-34659-2.
- Walsh, Jennifer Robin (May 21, 2004). Ancient Chinese Astronomical Technologies. American Physical Society, 6th Annual Northwest Section Meeting, 21–22 May 2004 (Poster). Pullman, WA.

== Egyptian water clocks ==
- Clagett, Marshall (1995). Ancient Egyptian Science. Vol. II: Calendars, Clocks, and Astronomy. American Philosophical Society. pp. 457–462. ISBN 0-87169-214-7.
- Cotterell, B.; Dickson, F.P.; Kamminga, J. (1986). "Ancient Egyptian Water-clocks: A Reappraisal". Journal of Archaeological Science. 13 (1): 31–50. Bibcode:1986JArSc..13...31C. doi:10.1016/0305-4403(86)90025-7.
- Cotterell, Brian; Kamminga, Johan (1990). Mechanics of pre-industrial technology: An introduction to the mechanics of ancient and traditional material culture. Cambridge University Press. ISBN 0-521-42871-8. OCLC 18520966.
- Fermor, John (1997). "Timing the Sun in Egypt and Mesopotamia". Vistas in Astronomy. 41 (1): 157–167. Bibcode:1997VA.....41..157F. doi:10.1016/S0083-6656(96)00069-4.
- Neugebauer, Otto; Parker, Richard A. (1969). Egyptian Astronomical Texts. Vol. III: Decans, Planets, Constellations, and Zodiacs. Providence, RI: Brown University Press/Lund Humphries.
- Pogo, Alexander (1936). "Egyptian water clocks". Isis. 25 (2): 403–425. doi:10.1086/347090. S2CID 122385803. (Reprinted in Mayr, Otto, ed. (1976). Philosophers and Machines. Science History Publications.)
- Sloley, R.W. (1924). "Ancient Clepsydrae". Ancient Egypt: 43–50.
- Sloley, R.W. (1931). "Primitive methods of measuring time". JEA. 17: 174–176.

== European water clocks ==
- Bedini, S.A. (1962). "The Compartmented Cylindrical Clepsydra". Technology and Culture. 3 (2): 115–141. doi:10.2307/3101437. ISSN 0040-165X. JSTOR 3101437. S2CID 112844914.
- Drover, C.B. (1954). "A Medieval Monastic Water Clock". Antiquarian Horology. I (5): 54–58.
- Hill, Donald Routledge (1996). A History of Engineering in Classical and Medieval Times. La Salle, IL: Open Court. ISBN 0-415-15291-7.
- Hill, D.R (1994). "The Toledo Water-Clocks of c.1075". History of Technology. 16: 62–71.
- Maddison, Francis; Scott, Byan; Kent, Allan (1962). "An early medieval water-clock". Antiquarian Horology. 3, n. 12: 348–353.
- Scattergood, John. (October 2003). "Writing the clock: the reconstruction of time in the late Middle Ages". European Review. 11 (4): 453–474. doi:10.1017/S1062798703000425. S2CID 145056908.

== Greek and Alexandrian water clocks ==
- Hill, Donald Routledge, ed. (1976). Archimedes' On the Construction of Water-Clocks. Paris: Turner & Devereux.
- Lepschy, Antonio M. (February 1992). "Feedback Control in Ancient Water and Mechanical Clocks". IEEE Transactions on Education. 35 (1): 3–10. Bibcode:1992ITEdu..35....3L. doi:10.1109/13.123411.
- Lewis, Michael (2000). "Theoretical Hydraulics, Automata, and Water Clocks". In Wikander, Örjan (ed.). Handbook of Ancient Water Technology. Technology and Change in History. Vol. 2. Leiden. pp. 343–369 (356f.). ISBN 90-04-11123-9.
- Noble, J.V.; de Solla Price, D. J. (1968). "The Water clock in the Tower of the Winds". American Journal of Archaeology. 72 (4): 345–355. doi:10.2307/503828. JSTOR 503828. S2CID 193112893.
- The Pneumatics of Hero of Alexandria. Translated by Woodcroft, Bennet. London: Taylor Walton and Maberly. 1851. Bibcode:1851phal.book.....W.
- Vitruvius, P. (1960). The Ten Books on Architecture. Translated by Morgan, M.H. New York: Dover Publications.

== Indian water clocks ==
- Achar, N (1998). "On the Vedic origin of the ancient mathematical astronomy of India". Journal of Studies on Ancient India. 1: 95–108.
- Fleet, J. F. (1915). "The ancient Indian water clock". Journal of the Royal Asiatic Society: 213–230.
- Kumar, Narendra (2004). Science in Ancient India. Anmol Publications. ISBN 81-261-2056-8.
- Pingree, D. (1973). "The Mesopotamian origin of early Indian mathematical astronomy". Journal for the History of Astronomy. 4: 1–12. Bibcode:1973JHA.....4....1P. doi:10.1177/002182867300400102. S2CID 125228353.
- Pingree, D. (1976). "The recovery of early Greek astronomy from India". Journal for the History of Astronomy. 7 (2): 109–123. Bibcode:1976JHA.....7..109P. doi:10.1177/002182867600700202. S2CID 68858864.

== Korean water clocks ==
- Hong, Sungook (July 1998). "Book Review: Korean Water-Clocks: "Chagyongnu", the Striking Clepsydra, and the History of Control and Instrumentation Engineering". Technology and Culture. 39 (3): 553–555.
- Nam, Moon-Hyon (1990). "Chagyongnu: The Automatic Striking Water clock". Korea Journal. 30 (7): 9–21.
- Nam, Moon-Hyon; Jeon, San-Woon (October 6–11, 1993). Timekeeping Systems of Early Choson Dynasty. First International Conference on Oriental Astronomy, From Guo Shoujing to King Sejong, Seoul. Seoul: Yonsei University Press (published 1997). pp. 305–324.
- Needham, Joseph; Major, John S.; Lu, Gwei-Djen (1986). Hall of Heavenly Records: Korean Astronomical Instruments and Clocks, 1380–1780. Cambridge University Press. ISBN 0-521-30368-0.
- From the Veritable Records of the Joseon Dynasty:
  - Hyeonjong Shillock (Veritable Records of King Hyeonjong), 1669
  - Jungjong Shillok (Veritable Records of King Jungjong), 1536.
  - Sejong Shillock (Veritable Records of King Sejong), Chapter. 65, AD 1434 and Chapter. 80, AD 1438.

== Mesopotamian water clocks ==
- Brown, David R.; Fermor, John; Walker, Christopher B.F. (1999–2000). "The Water Clock in Mesopotamia". Archiv für Orientforschung (46/47).
- Chadwick, R. (1984). "The Origins of Astronomy and Astrology in Mesopotamia". Archaeoastronomy. BULL. CTR ARCH. 7 (1–4): 89. Bibcode:1984Arch....7...89C.
- Fermor, John (1997). "Timing the Sun in Egypt and Mesopotamia". Vistas in Astronomy. 41 (1): 157–167. Bibcode:1997VA.....41..157F. doi:10.1016/S0083-6656(96)00069-4.
- Walker, Christopher; Britton, John (1996). "Astronomy and Astrology in Mesopotamia". In Walker, C. (ed.). Astronomy Before the Telescope. London: British Museum Press. pp. 42–67.

== Russian ancient water clocks ==
- Vodolazhskaya, Larisa N.; Usachuk, Anatoliy N.; Nevsky, Mikhail Yu (2015). "Clepsydra of the Bronze Age from the Central Donbass" (PDF). Archaeoastronomy and Ancient Technologies. 3 (1): 65–87. doi:10.24411/2310-2144-2015-00010.

== Present-day water clocks ==
- Gitton, Bernard (June 1989). ""Time, like an everflowing stream." Trans. Mlle. Annie Chadeyron. Ed. Anthony Randall". Horological Journal. 131 (12): 18–20.
- Taylor, Robert (March 15, 2006). "Taiwan's Biggest Cuckoo Clock?: Recreating an Astronomical Timepiece". Sinorama Magazine. Archived from the original on March 5, 2016.
- Xuan, Gao (August 18–21, 2003). Principle Research and Reconstruction Experiment of the Astronomical Clock Tower in Ancient China. 11th World Congress in Mechanism and machine Science. Tianjin, China.

== Other topics on water clocks and related material ==
- Goodenow, Jennifer; Orr, Richard; Ross, David (2007), Mathematical Models of Water Clocks (PDF), Rochester Institute of Technology
- Landels, John G. (1979). "Water-Clocks and Time Measurement in Classical Antiquity". Endeavour. 3 (1): 32–37. doi:10.1016/0160-9327(79)90007-3. ISSN 0160-9327.
- Mills, A. A. (1982). "Newton's Water Clocks and the Fluid Mechanics of Clepsydrae". Notes and Records of the Royal Society of London. 37 (1): 35–61. doi:10.1098/rsnr.1982.0004. ISSN 0035-9149. JSTOR 531476. S2CID 145355791.
- Neugebauer, Otto (1969) [1957]. The Exact Sciences in Antiquity. Vol. 9 (2 ed.). Dover Publications. pp. 1–191. ISBN 978-0-486-22332-2. PMID 14884919.
- Sarma, S.R. (2004). "Setting up the Water Clock for Telling the Time of Marriage". In Ch. Burnett; J.P. Hogendijk; K. Plofker; M. Yano (eds.). Studies in the History of the Exact Sciences in Honour of David Pingree. Leiden: Brill. pp. 302–330. ISBN 978-9004132023.
- Snell, Daniel (1997). Life in the Ancient Near East, 3100-332 B.C.E. Yale University Press. ISBN 0-300-07666-5.

== Non-English resources ==
- Bilfinger, Gustav (1888). Die babylonische Doppelstunde: Eine chronologische Untersuchung (in German). Stuttgart: Wildt.
- Borchardt, Ludwig (1920). Die Altägyptische Zeitmessung [Old Egyptian time measurement] (in German). Berlin: Leipzig.
- Daressy, G. (1915). "Deux clepsydres antiques". BIE (in French). 5 (9): 5–16.
- Ginzel, Friedrich Karl (1920). "Die Wassermessungen der Babylonier und das Sexagesimalsystem". Klio: Beiträge zur alten Geschichte (in German). 16: 234–241.
- Hahn, Young-Ho; Nam, Moon-Hyon (1997). "Reconstruction of the Armillary Spheres of Mid-Chosun: The Armillary Clocks of Yi Minchol". Hanguk Kwahaksa Hakhoeji (Journal of the Korean History of Science Society) (in Korean). 19 (1): 3–19.
- Hahn, Young-Ho (2000). "Astronomical Clocks of Chosun Dynasty: King Sejong's Heumgyonggaknu". Kisulgwa Yoksa (Journal of the Korean Society for the History of Technology and Industry) (in Korean). 1 (1): 99–140.
- Nam, Moon-Hyon (1995). Korean Water Clocks: Jagyongnu, The Striking Clepsydra and The History of Control and Instrumentation Engineering (in Korean). Seoul: Konkuk University Press.
- Nam, Moon-Hyon (1998). "On the BORUGAKGI of Kim Don—Principles and Structures of JAYEONGNU". Hanguksa Yeongu (Studies on Korean History) (in Korean). 101: 75–114.
- Nam, Moon-Hyon (2002). Jang Yeong-Shil and Jagyeongnu – Reconstruction of Time Measuring History of Choseon Period (in Korean). Seoul National University Press.
- Planchon. "L'Heure Par Les Clepsydres". La Nature (in French): 55–59.
- Thureau-Dangin, François (1932). "La clepsydre chez les Babyloniens (Notes assyriologiques LXIX)". Revue d'assyriologie et d'archéologie orientale (in French). 29: 133–136.
- Thureau-Dangin, François (1933). "Clepsydre babylonienne et clepsydre égyptienne". Revue d'assyriologie et d'archéologie orientale (in French). 30: 51–52.
- Thureau-Dangin, François (1937). "Le clepsydre babylonienne". Revue d'assyriologie et d'archéologie orientale (in French). 34: 144.
