= Alexander George McAdie =

American meteorologist (1863–1943)

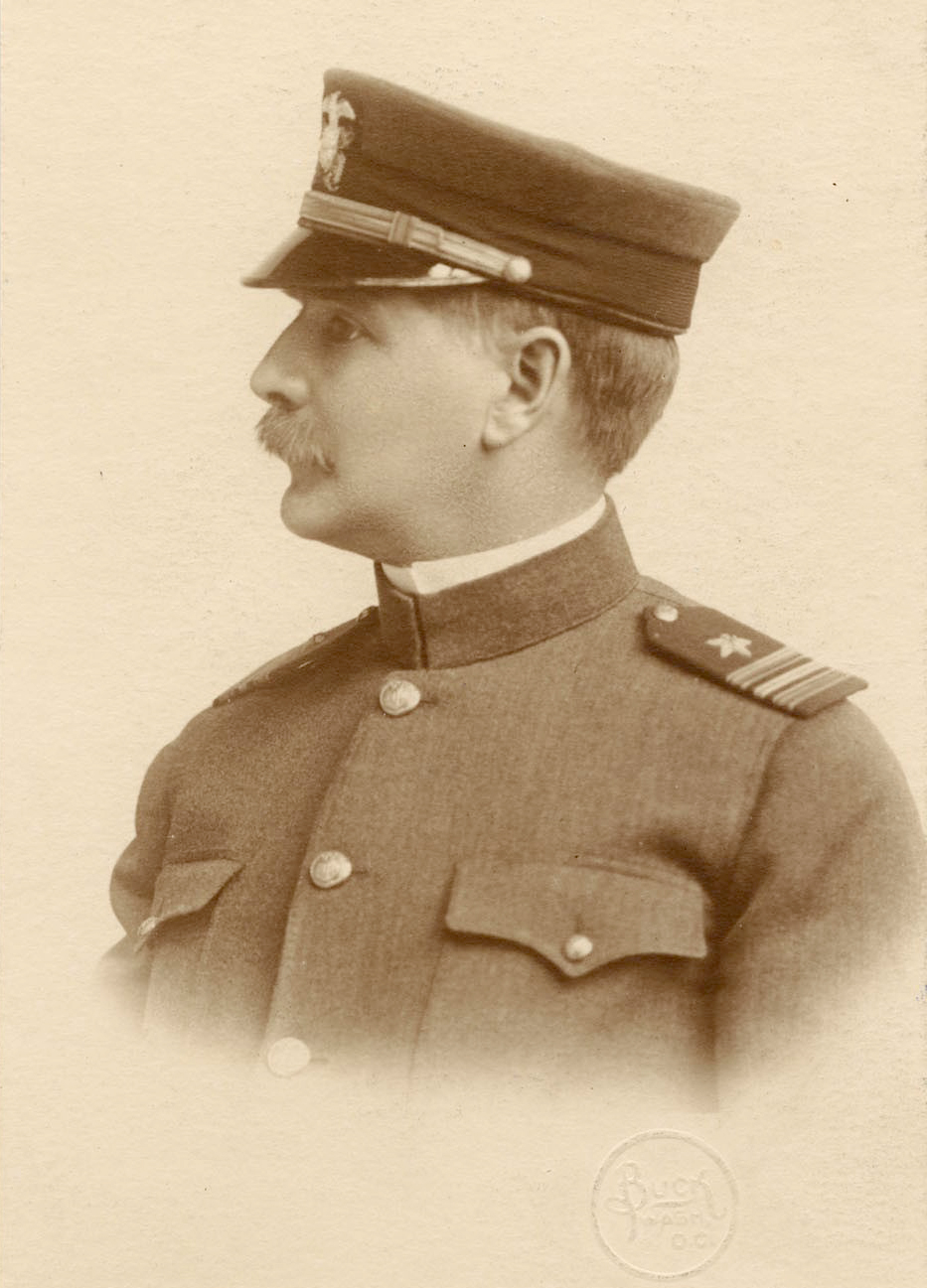
- Alexander George McAdie
- Born: August 4, 1863
- Died: November 1, 1943 (aged 80)
- Education: Harvard University
- Scientific career
- Fields: meteorology

Alexander George McAdie (August 4, 1863 – November 1, 1943) was an American meteorologist.

McAdie was born in New York City. While in college he joined the Army Signal Service, the predecessor of the U.S. Weather Bureau. He graduated from Harvard University in 1885.

From 1903 until 1913 he ran the U.S. Weather Bureau in San Francisco. He was also the vice president of the Sierra Club, starting in 1904, and continuing until 1913. In 1913 he became Professor of meteorology at Harvard, and remained there until 1931. During the same period he also served as the director of the Blue Hill Observatory.

Among his accomplishments was the invention of a device to prevent frost from harming fruit. He was a pioneer in the use of kites to study conditions at high altitudes. In 1885 at Blue Hill, Boston, he modernized the experiments of Benjamin Franklin by attaching a voltmeter to a kite and measuring the voltage difference between the ground and several hundred feet up. He also made studies of the atmospheric effects of smoke, the connection between the aurora and electricity in the atmosphere, and the dangers posed by lightning. He is the author of a cloud atlas.

He is also known for testifying about the potential effects of electrocution (based on his experience with lightning) in 1899 at the first trial to decide if the electric chair was cruel and unusual punishment. His testimony was used against the use of the electric chair for the death penalty.

In addition to his work with the weather bureau, McAdie wrote a detailed account of the 1906 San Francisco earthquake and compiled a catalog of earthquakes on the Pacific coast.

He was married to Mary Randolph Brown McAdie. He died in Hampton, Virginia, but he is buried in the Monticello graveyard in Abemarle County, Virginia.

McAdie at the Fourth Conference International Union for Cooperation in Solar Research at Mount Wilson Observatory, 1910

== Awards and honors ==
- Mount McAdie in the Sierra Nevada range was named after him.
- The crater McAdie on the Moon is named after him.
- The Fleet Weather Center building in Norfolk, VA is named after him.
