= Francisco Rodón =

Puerto Rican painter (1934–2023)

Francisco Rodón (June 6, 1934 – March 18, 2023) was a Puerto Rican portrait and landscape painter.

Born in San Sebastian, Puerto Rico, Rodón studied in Mexico, France, and Spain. In 1953 he studied at the Julien Academy in Paris, France and later at Real Academia de Bellas Artes de San Fernando in Madrid, Spain. In 1955 he attended the Academy of the National Institute of Fine Arts in Mexico. He moved to New York in 1958 to study at the Art Students League of New York, where he took drawing and composition classes under the tutelage of Howard Trafton. He was named Puerto Rico's most important 20th century painter at the Expo 92 World's Fair in Seville, Spain, joining the 18th century's José Campeche and the 19th century's Francisco Oller. He was a professor and artist-in-residence at the University of Puerto Rico.

Known for his portraits of major cultural figures, such as Argentinian author Jorge Luis Borges, Puerto Rican governor Luis Muñoz Marín, Cuban dancer Alicia Alonso, and Perú's Nobel laureate Mario Vargas Llosa. Rodón also painted a double portrait of Puerto Rican poet Giannina Braschi as a child sitting next to her mother.

The value of his works has exceeded that of other living Puerto Ricans in auctions held between 1990 and 2009. Retrato de Medea sold for $93,000 in 1990. In 2009, his most recent oil on canvas, Puedo Retornar al Crepúsculo y la Noche sold for US $302,500 at Sotheby's, the highest price paid to that date for a Puerto Rican painting. His painting of Muñoz Marín is valued at 1 million dollars.

Rodon died at his home in San Juan, Puerto Rico on March 18, 2023, at the age of 88.

== Relevant works ==
Naturaleza Muerta con Aguacate

last sold on May 30, 2007, 118x87cm oil on canvas painted in 1962

Portrait of Jimmy

last sold on November 17, 2005, 91x72cm oil on panel painted in 1961

Borges o El Aleph

last sold on June 10, 2004, 306x142cm huile/toile painted c.1975

Inés en mis Sueños

last sold on May 28, 2002, 221-165 oil on canvas painted between 1996 and 2002

Juan Rulfo o Pedro Páramo

last sold on November 23, 1999, 287x211cm oil on canvas painted between 1981 and 1983

Vendedor de Solandras

last sold on November 22, 1999, 155x203cm oil on canvas painted between 1991 and 1993

Retrato de Medea

last sold for $93,000 on May 1, 1990, 183x127cm oil on canvas painted between 1969 and 1971

Portrait of Luis Muñoz Marín

The painting is part of the Luis Muñoz Marín Foundation's permanent collection.

Alicia Alonso

Mario Vargas Llosa
