= Erro (crater) =

Crater on the Moon

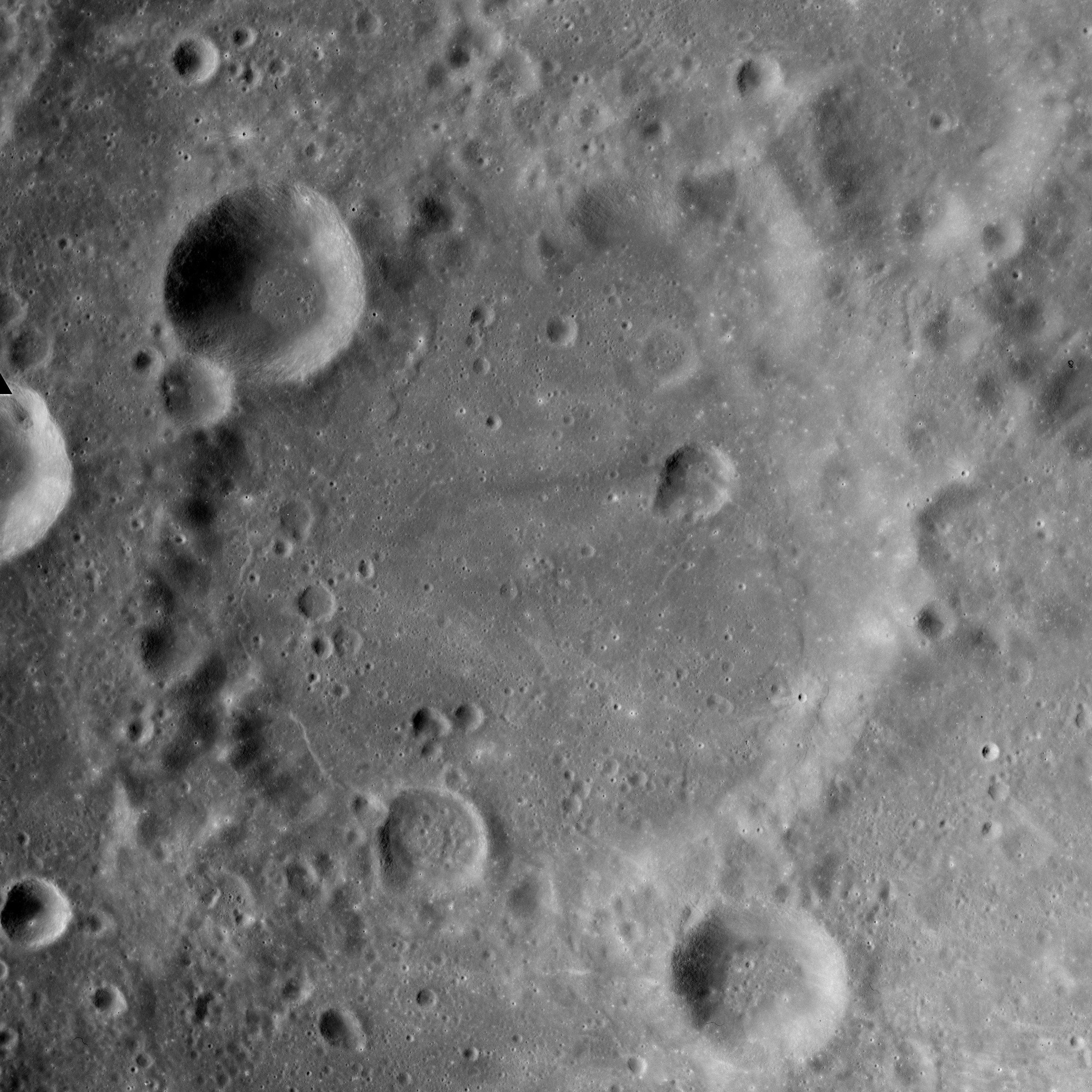
- Apollo 16 Mapping Camera image
- Coordinates: 5.68°N 98.54°E
- Diameter: 63.75 km (39.61 mi)
- Depth: 1.98 km (1.23 mi)
- Colongitude: 187° at sunrise
- Eponym: Luis Enrique Erro

Erro is a lunar impact crater that lies beyond the eastern limb of the Moon, on the far side as seen from the Earth. It lies along the eastern fringes of the uneven plain that joins Mare Marginis to the northwest with Mare Smythii to the west-southwest. Nearby craters of note include Babcock to the west-southwest, Saenger to the east-southeast and Dreyer to the north-northwest.

This crater has a low, broken rim that only projects a small distance above the surface. The somewhat uneven surrounding plains have intruded into the interior of this crater, leaving a level, nearly featureless floor. The most intact sections of the rim lie along the northern and northeastern sides. The satellite crater Erro V is attached to the outer rim to the northwest, and there is a smaller crater along the southern rim. There is a small craterlet in the northeastern part of the interior floor.

The crater is named after the Mexican astronomer Luis Enrique Erro (1897-1955). Its designation was officially adopted by the International Astronomical Union in 1970.

== Satellite craters ==
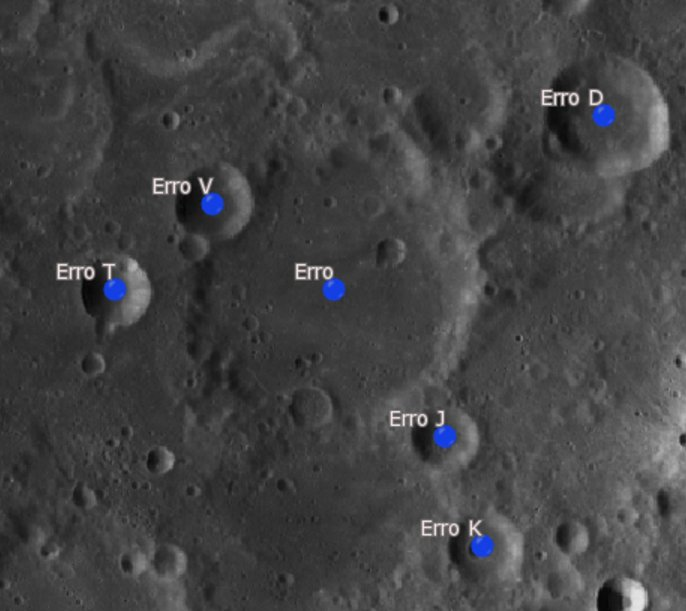
Erro and its satellite craters

By convention these features are identified on lunar maps by placing the letter on the side of the crater midpoint that is closest to Erro.

Erro	Latitude	Longitude	Diameter
D	6.8° N	100.5° E	30 km
J	4.6° N	99.4° E	15 km
K	3.8° N	99.6° E	17 km
T	5.6° N	96.9° E	16 km
V	6.3° N	97.8° E	18 km
