= Dreyer (crater) =

Crater on the Moon

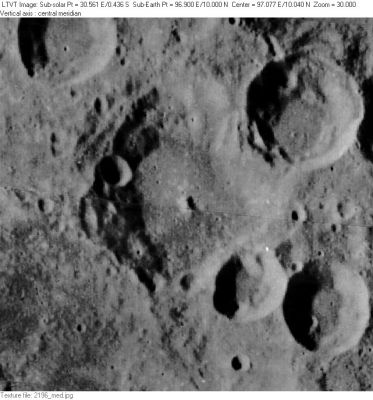
- Lunar Orbiter 4 image of the crater (center). On top right is Dreyer C, on the bottom right are Dreyer K and J and on top left is Dreyer W
- Coordinates: 10.0°N 96.9°E
- Diameter: 63.84 km (39.67 mi)
- Colongitude: 264° at sunrise
- Eponym: John L. E. Dreyer

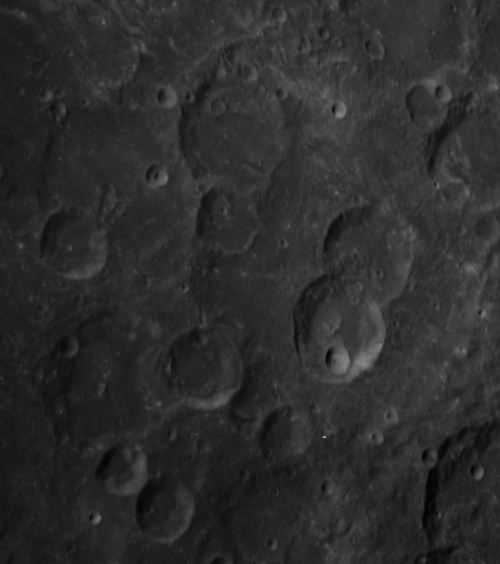
Oblique Apollo 14 Hasselblad camera image of Dreyer, Ginzel, and several of their satellite craters. From center, Ginzel is at approximately 12:00, and Dreyer is at approximately 8:00. The small crater at 9:00 is Dreyer W. Dreyer C is just east of Dreyer, and Dreyer K and J are to the south and southeast of Dreyer.

Dreyer is the remnant of a lunar impact crater on the far side of the Moon. It is located along the eastern edge of the Mare Marginis, about midway between the craters Ginzel to the north and Erro to the south-southeast.

The rim of this crater is heavily worn, with multiple impacts overlaying the edge and a small gap at the south end. The satellite crater Dreyer C lies across the northeastern rim, while Dreyer K intrudes into the southeastern side. The interior floor is relatively level and featureless, with a few tiny craterlets marking the surface. There is a low central ridge at the midpoint.

This formation was named after Danish-Irish astronomer John L. E. Dreyer (1852-1926). Its designation was formally adopted by the International Astronomical Union in 1970.

== Satellite craters ==
By convention these features are identified on lunar maps by placing the letter on the side of the crater midpoint that is closest to Dreyer.

Dreyer	Latitude	Longitude	Diameter
C	11.2° N	98.2° E	37 km
D	10.8° N	99.8° E	27 km
J	8.8° N	98.2° E	29 km
K	9.0° N	97.4° E	23 km
R	8.5° N	94.0° E	18 km
W	11.8° N	95.7° E	30 km
