= Al-Khwarizmi (crater) =

Lunar impact crater

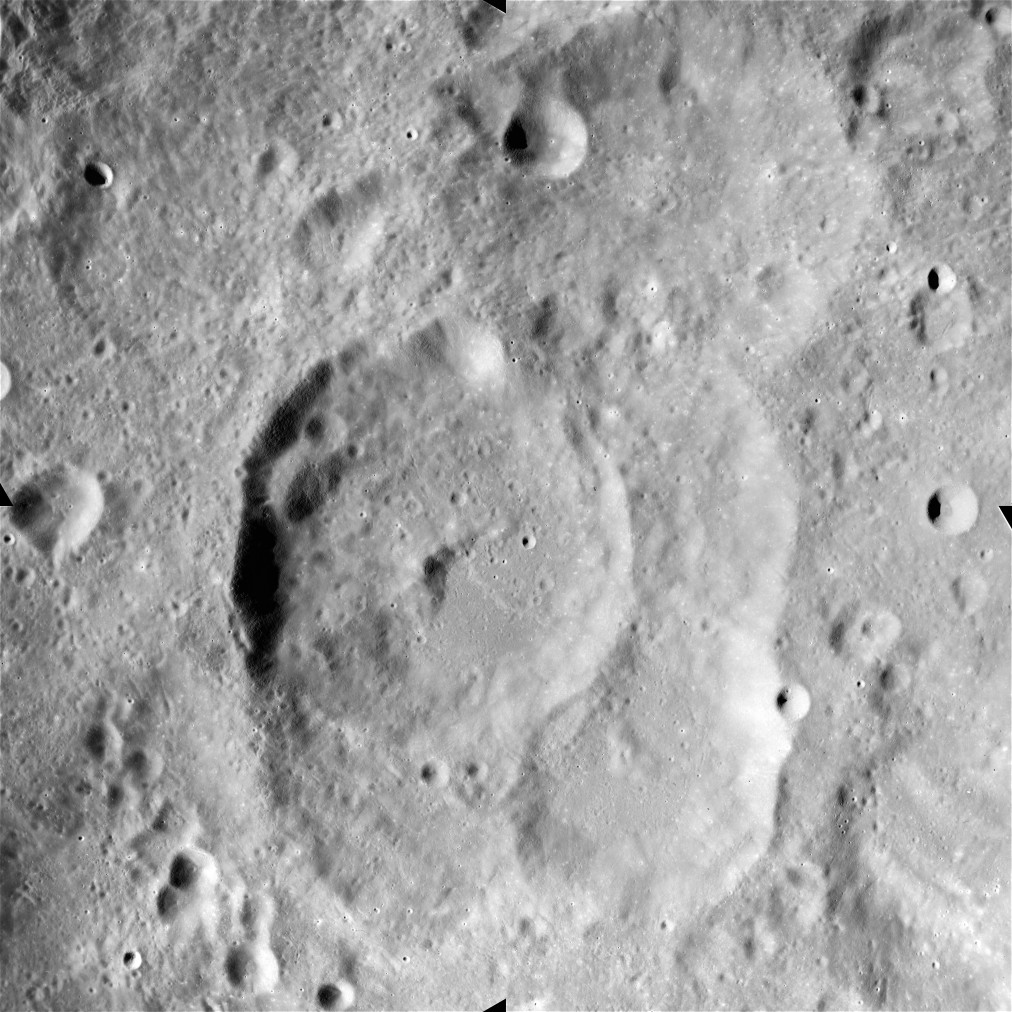
- Al-Khwarizmi from Apollo 16. NASA photo.
- Coordinates: 7.1°N 107.0°E
- Diameter: 56.25 km
- Depth: Unknown
- Colongitude: 254° at sunrise
- Formation: Nectarian
- Eponym: Muhammad ibn Musa al-Khwarizmi

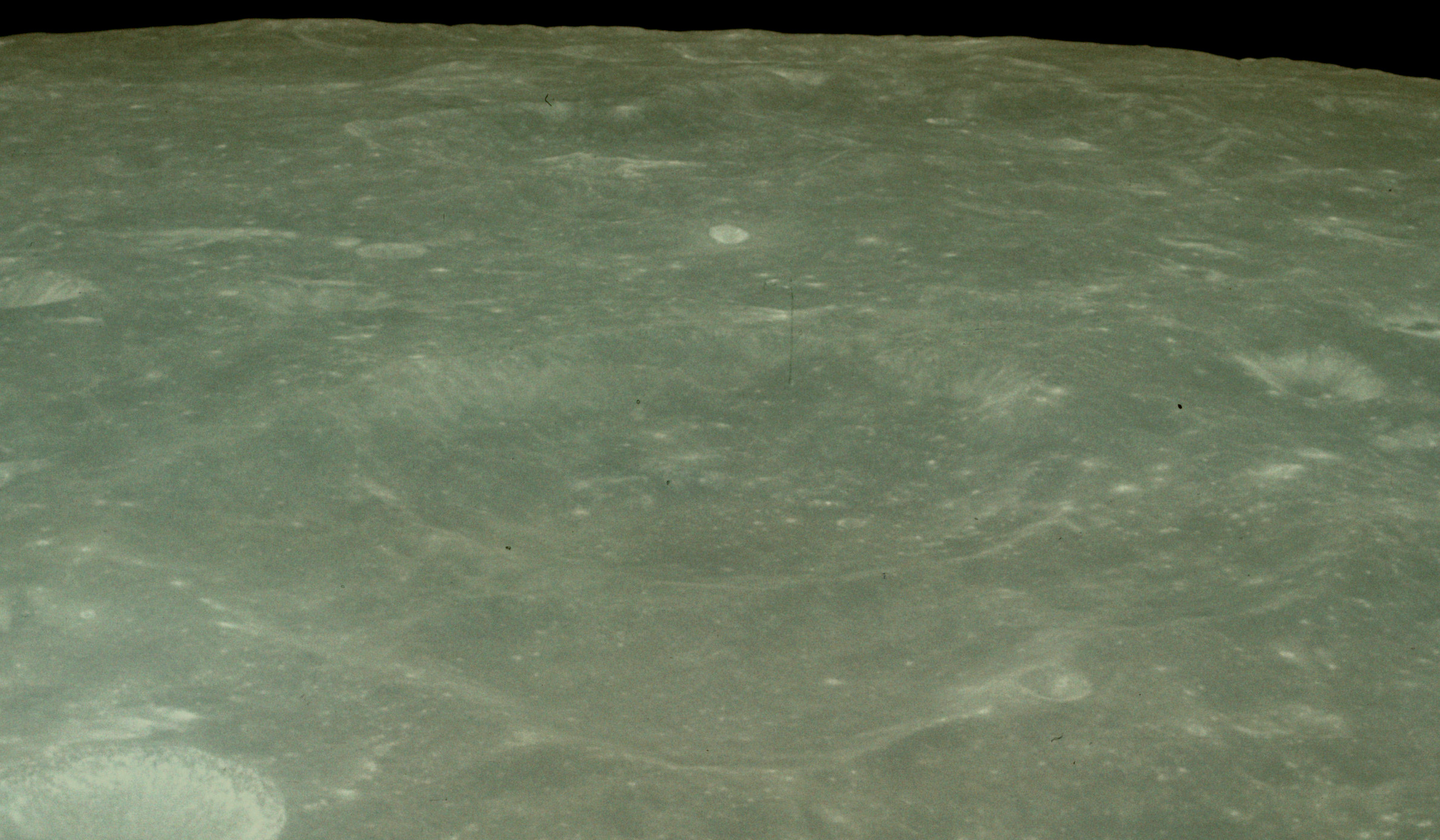
Oblique view from Apollo 11

Al-Khwarizmi is a lunar impact crater located on the far side of the Moon. It lies to the southeast of the crater Moiseev, and northeast of Saenger.

This crater dates to the Nectarian age on the lunar geologic timescale. The western inner wall of Al-Khwarizmi is much wider than along the eastern side. The eastern rim overlays a pair of craters, including Al-Khwarizmi J. The outer wall is somewhat distorted from a circular shape, including a double-rim in the south. There is a small central peak at the midpoint, which forms part of a low ridge that bends to the northeast. Several tiny craterlets lie in the northern part of the interior floor. The floor to the southeast is somewhat smoother and free of significant impacts.

The crater was named for the Iranian mathematician and astronomer Muhammad ibn Musa al-Khwarizmi. Its designation was formally adopted by the International Astronomical Union in 1973. The crater had previously been informally referred to as Arabia, such as during the Apollo 17 mission.

== Satellite craters ==
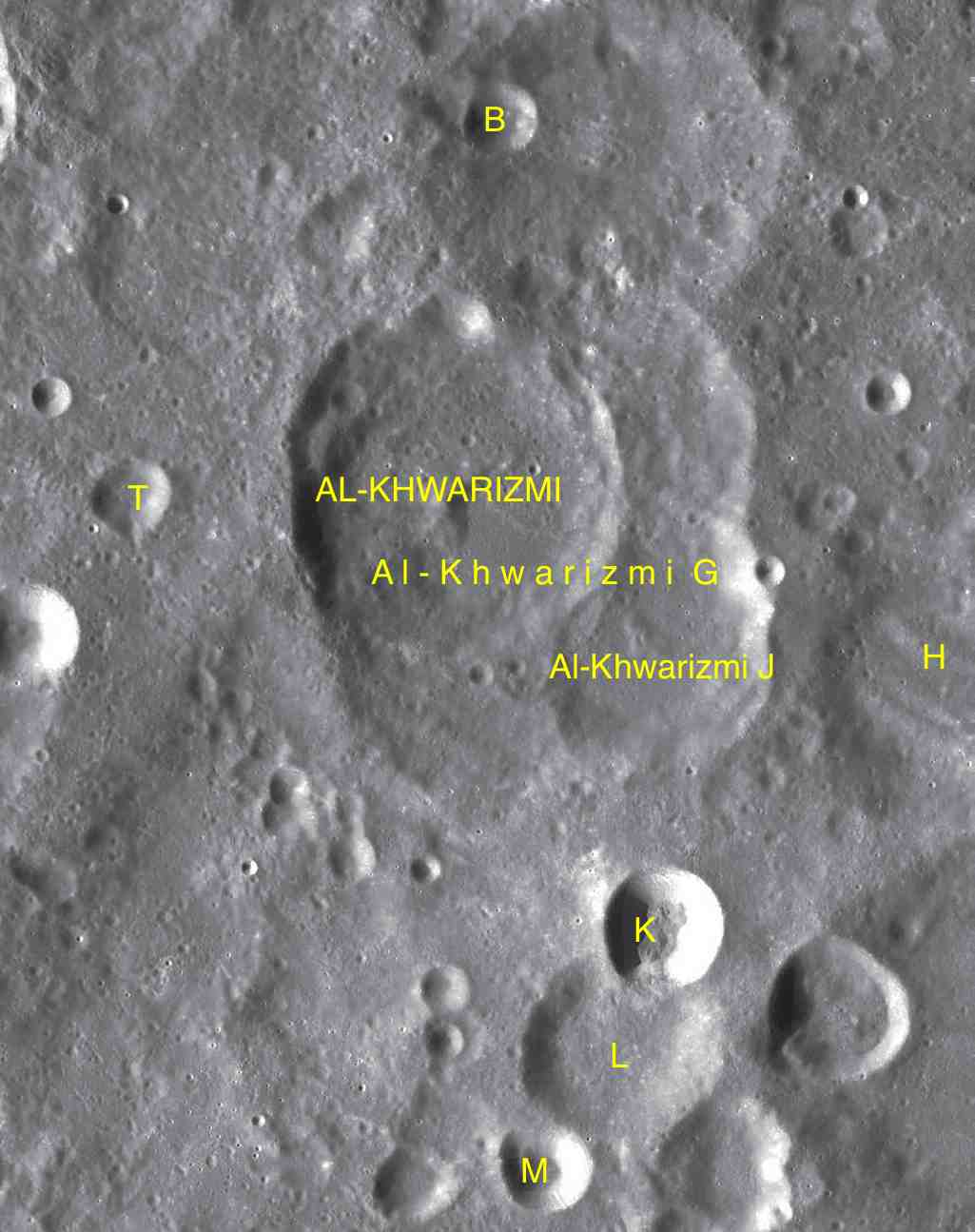
al-Khwarizmi and its satellite craters

By convention these features are identified on lunar maps by placing the letter on the side of the crater midpoint that is closest to Al-Khwarizmi.

Al-Khwarizmi	Latitude	Longitude	Diameter
B	9.0° N	107.4° E	62 km
G	6.9° N	107.1° E	95 km
H	6.0° N	109.2° E	50 km
J	6.2° N	107.6° E	47 km
K	4.6° N	107.6° E	26 km
L	3.9° N	107.4° E	35 km
M	3.1° N	107.0° E	18 km
T	7.0° N	104.5° E	15 km

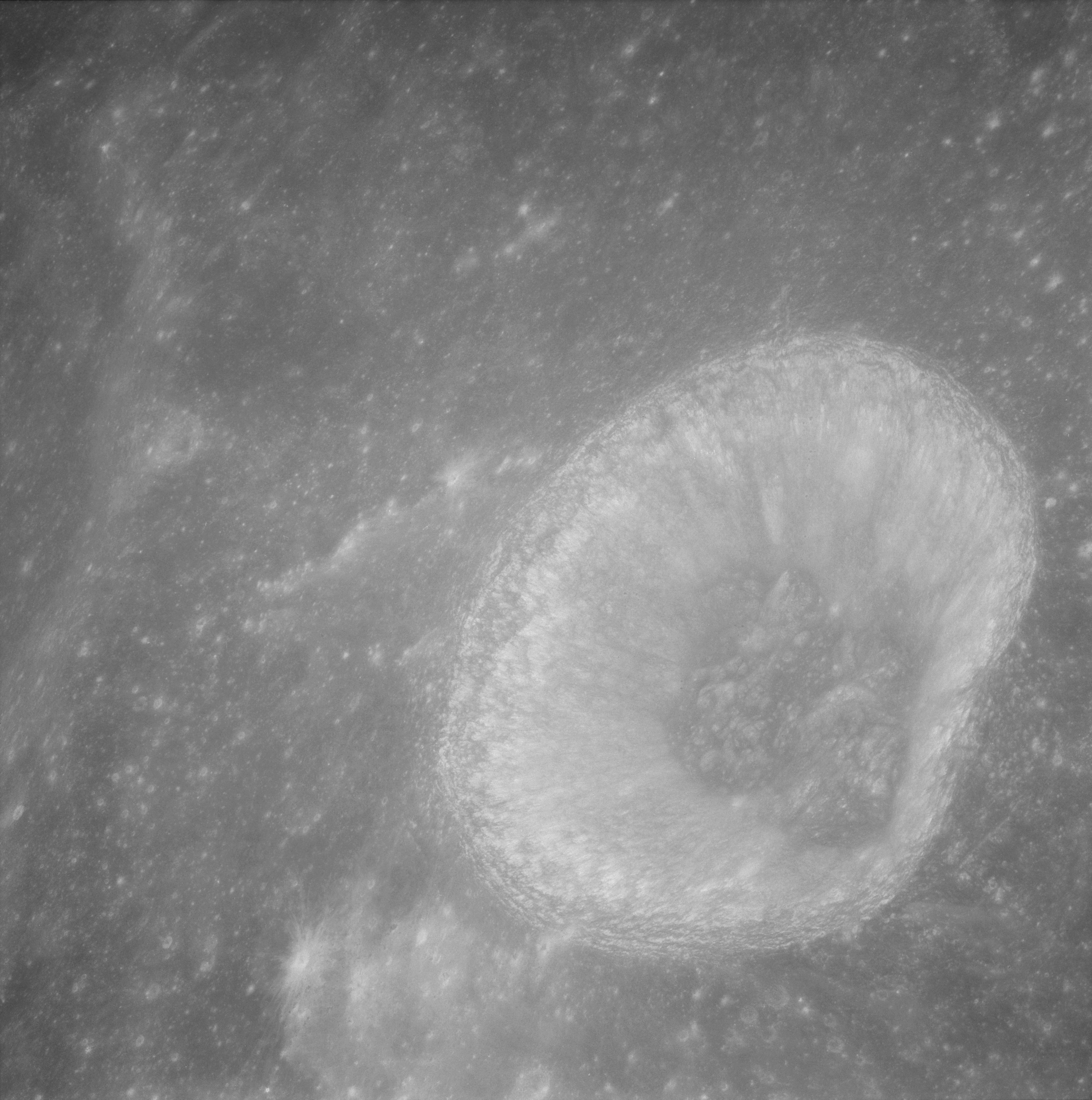
Al-Khwarizmi K crater from Apollo 11
