= Fleming (crater) =

Lunar impact crater

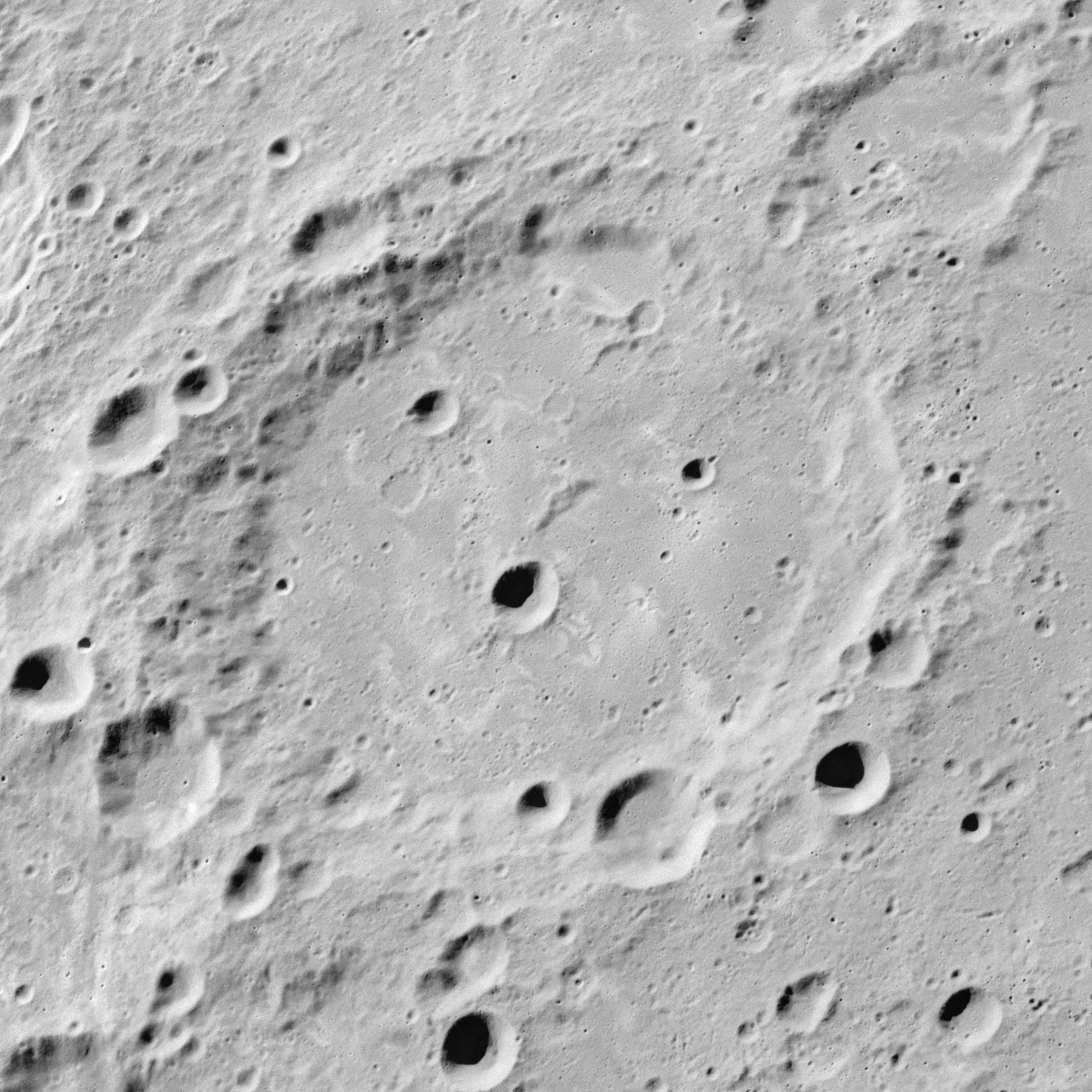
- Oblique Apollo 16 mapping camera image
- Coordinates: 15.0°N 109.6°E
- Diameter: 126.37 km (78.52 mi)
- Colongitude: 252° at sunrise
- Formation: Nectarian
- Eponym: Alexander Fleming and Williamina Fleming

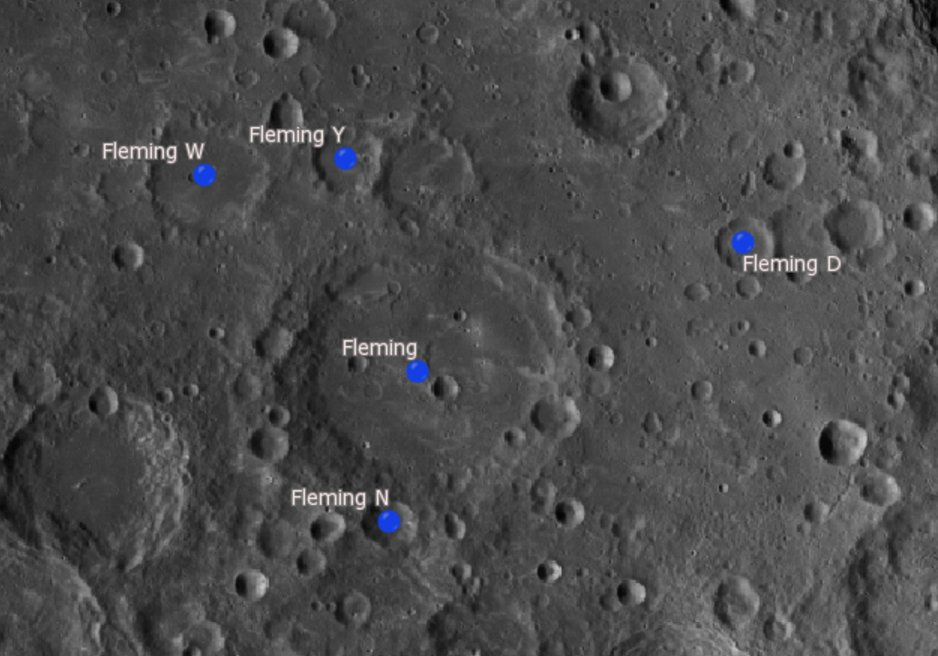
Fleming satellite craters and surroundings

Fleming is a large lunar impact crater that is located on the Moon's far side, and cannot be seen from the Earth. It lies about a crater diameter to the east-northeast of Hertz, and to the northwest of Lobachevskiy. Fleming lies within the Lomonosov-Fleming region, an enormous Pre-Nectarian impact basin.

On the lunar geologic timescale, Fleming is one of the largest craters of Nectarian age. The low rim is heavily eroded and overlaid by multiple smaller craters. The most notable of these is Fleming along the southern rim, while another, only slightly smaller crater cuts across the lower eastern rim. The interior floor is also marked by a number of small impacts and a few ghost-crater rims.

The crater was named after British doctor and Nobel laureate Alexander (1881-1955), and Scottish-born American astronomer Williamina Fleming (1857-1911). Prior to official adoption in 1970 by the International Astronomical Union, this crater was known as Crater 203.

== Satellite craters ==
By convention these features are identified on lunar maps by placing the letter on the side of the crater midpoint that is closest to Fleming.

Fleming	Latitude	Longitude	Diameter
D	17.0° N	114.0° E	25 km
N	12.7° N	108.8° E	24 km
W	18.0° N	106.2° E	50 km
Y	18.2° N	108.2° E	30 km
