= Zasyadko (crater) =

Crater on the Moon

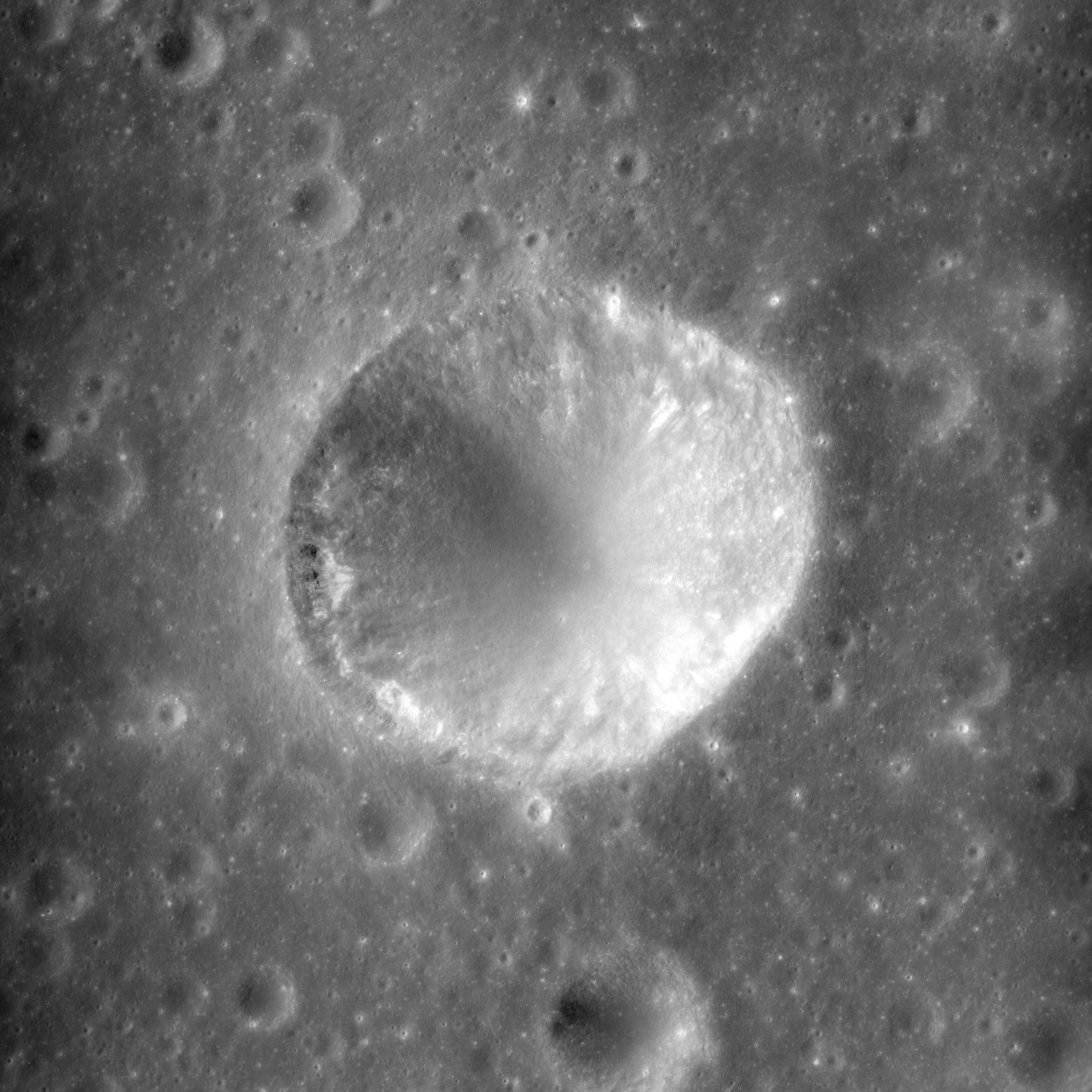
- Apollo 16 panoramic camera image
- Coordinates: 3.96°N 94.19°E
- Diameter: 10.27 km (6.38 mi)
- Depth: 1.94 km (1.21 mi)
- Colongitude: 266° at sunrise
- Eponym: Alexander D. Zasyadko

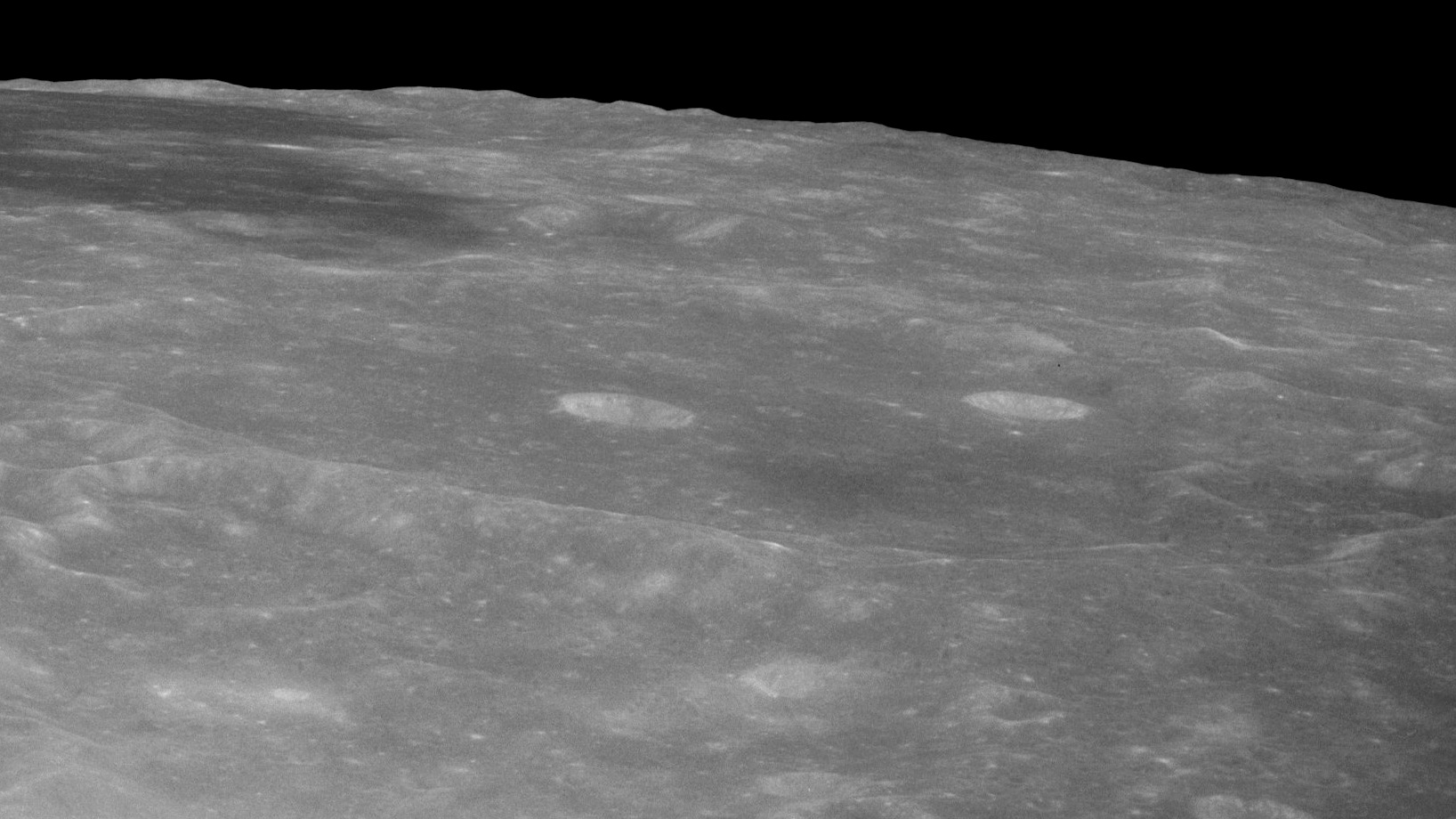
Oblique view of Babcock, facing west, with Zasyadko at center, from Apollo 11

Zasyadko is a small lunar impact crater located to the northeast of Mare Smythii. It was named by the IAU in 1976. It lies beyond the eastern lunar limb in an area that is only visible from Earth during favorable librations. It is located entirely within the crater Babcock. To the southwest is McAdie. Zasyadko is a bowl-shaped formation with a relatively small interior floor. It is not significantly eroded along the rim.
