= Saenger (crater) =

Lunar impact crater

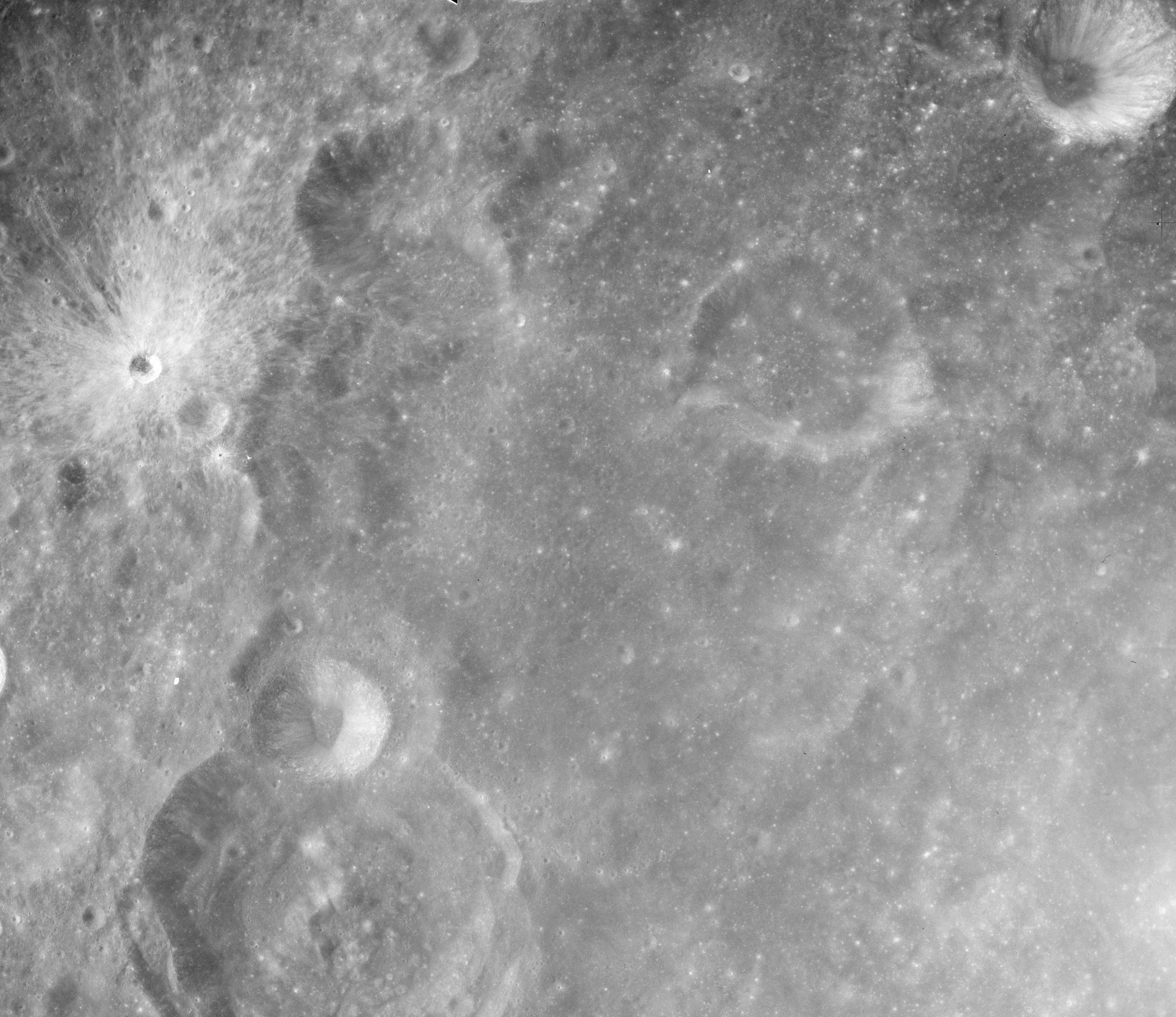
- Apollo 16 Mapping Camera image
- Coordinates: 4.3°N 102.4°E
- Diameter: 75 km
- Depth: Unknown
- Colongitude: 254° at sunrise
- Eponym: Eugen Sänger

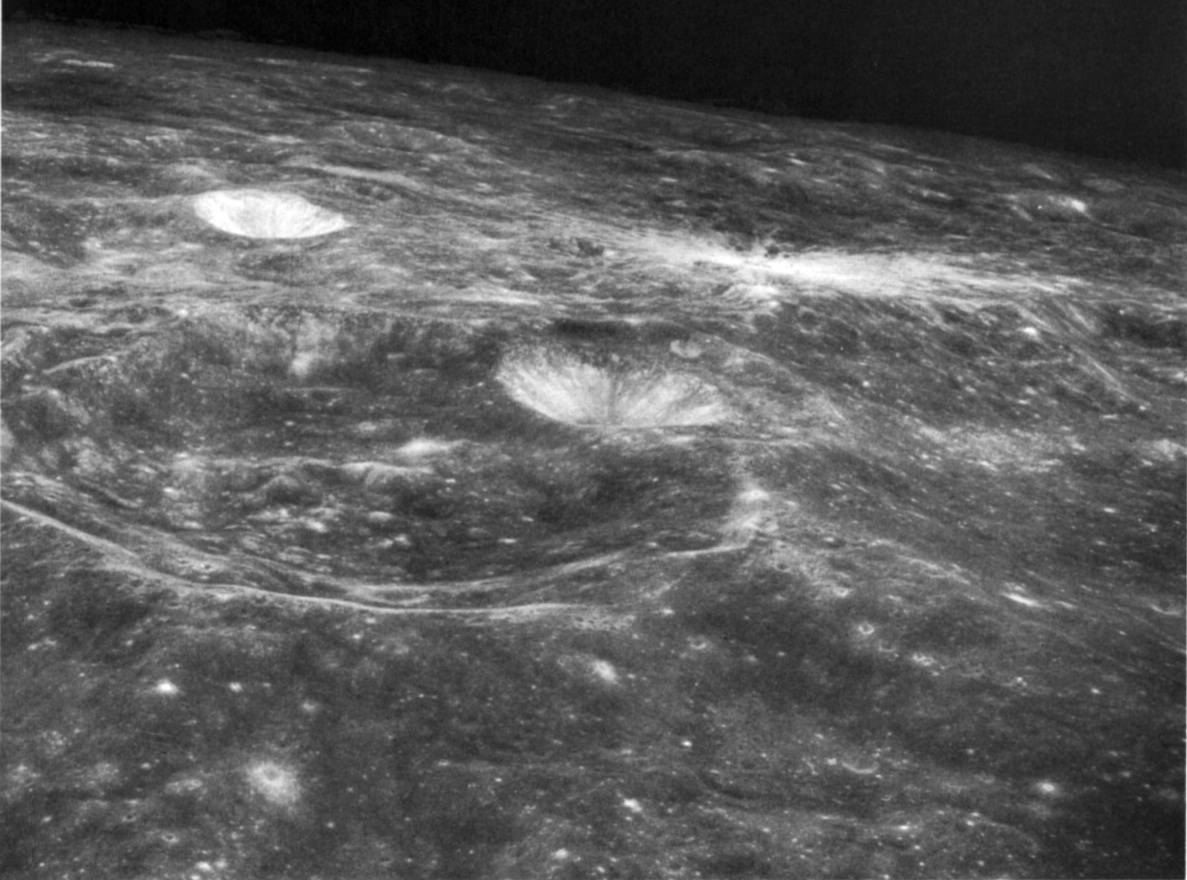
Oblique view of some of Saenger's satellite craters, including P (left of center), Q (center), and R (upper left), with part of Saenger at right. (Apollo 10)

Saenger is an ancient lunar impact crater that lies on the far side of the Moon, just beyond the eastern limb. It was named after Austrian rocketry scientist Eugen Sänger. To the west-northwest is the crater Erro, and due north lies Moiseev. To the northeast is Al-Khwarizmi.

The outer rim of Saenger has been eroded and reshaped by subsequent impacts, leaving the outer wall nearly destroyed to the north and south. The satellite crater Saenger D is adjacent to the interior of the northeastern rim. To the west, Saenger V lies across the northwestern rim, while the crater pair Saenger P and Q lie across and intrude into the southwestern rim. In contrast, the interior floor is relatively flat and featureless, with only tiny craterlets to mark the surface.

== Satellite craters ==
By convention these features are identified on lunar maps by placing the letter on the side of the crater midpoint that is closest to Saenger.

| Saenger | Latitude | Longitude | Diameter |
|---|---|---|---|
| B | 5.6° N | 103.1° E | 64 km |
| C | 6.1° N | 103.9° E | 20 km |
| D | 4.9° N | 103.0° E | 23 km |
| P | 2.7° N | 101.7° E | 41 km |
| Q | 3.4° N | 101.5° E | 14 km |
| R | 3.3° N | 100.3° E | 14 km |
| V | 5.2° N | 101.5° E | 21 km |
| X | 6.3° N | 101.8° E | 18 km |
