= Hertz (crater) =

Lunar impact crater

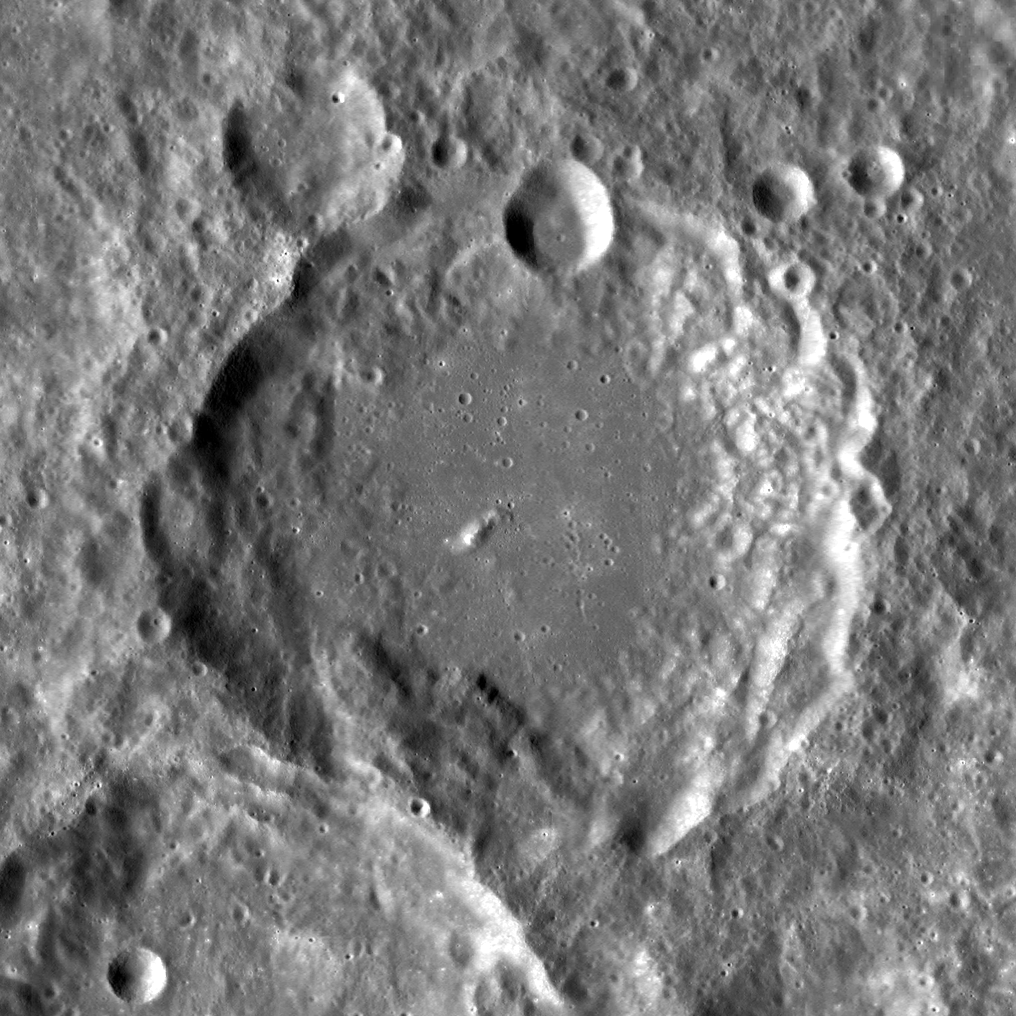
- Mosaic of photos by Lunar Reconnaissance Orbiter
- Coordinates: 13.4°N 104.5°E
- Diameter: 90 km
- Colongitude: 256° at sunrise
- Eponym: Heinrich R. Hertz

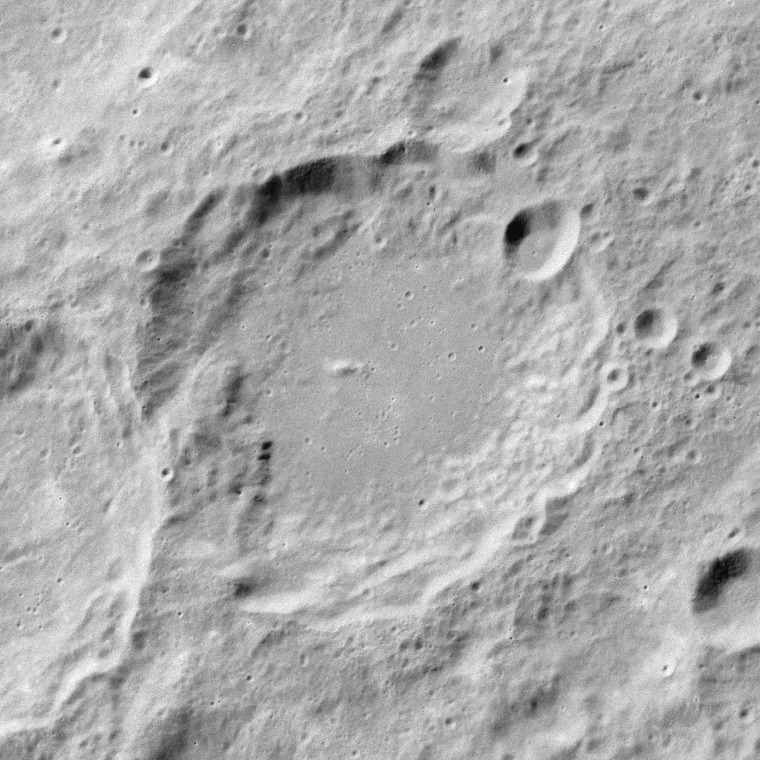
Oblique Apollo 16 mapping camera image, North on the photo is on the top right edge

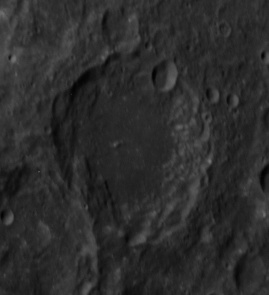
Oblique Apollo 14 Hasselblad camera image

Hertz is a lunar impact crater that lies on the far side of the Moon, just behind the eastern limb. It lies within the Lomonosov-Fleming region, an enormous Pre-Nectarian impact basin. Hertz is located to the west-southwest of the larger crater Fleming and north-northeast of the smaller Moiseev. Moiseev is joined to Hertz by the satellite crater Moiseev Z, and the three form a short crater chain.

This is a somewhat worn crater formation with a wide inner wall. There is a pear-shaped crater along the northern inner wall. The interior floor is relatively featureless, with only a small ridge offset to the southwest of the midpoint.

The crater was named after the German physicist Heinrich Rudolf Hertz in 1961. Prior to that, this crater was known as Crater 200.
