= McAdie (crater) =

Lunar crater

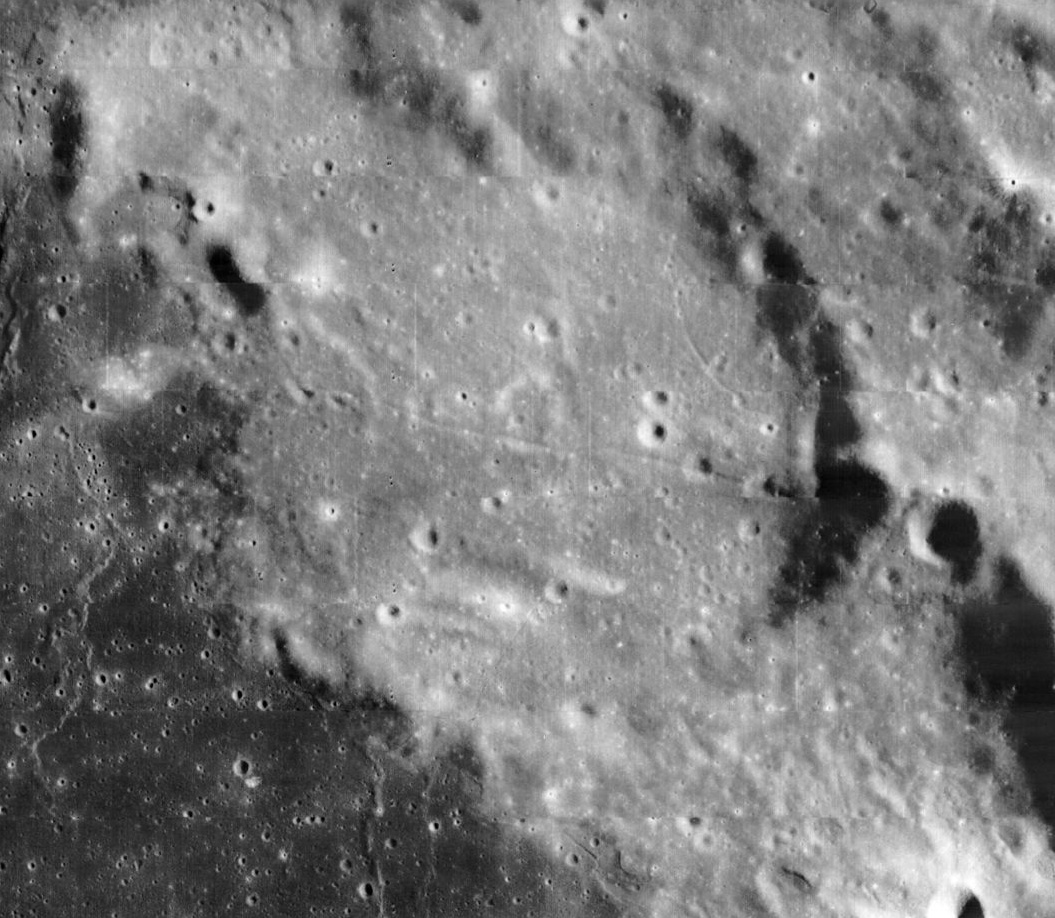
- Lunar Orbiter 1 image
- Coordinates: 2.1°N 92.1°E
- Diameter: 45 km
- Depth: Unknown
- Colongitude: 268° at sunrise
- Eponym: Alexander G. McAdie

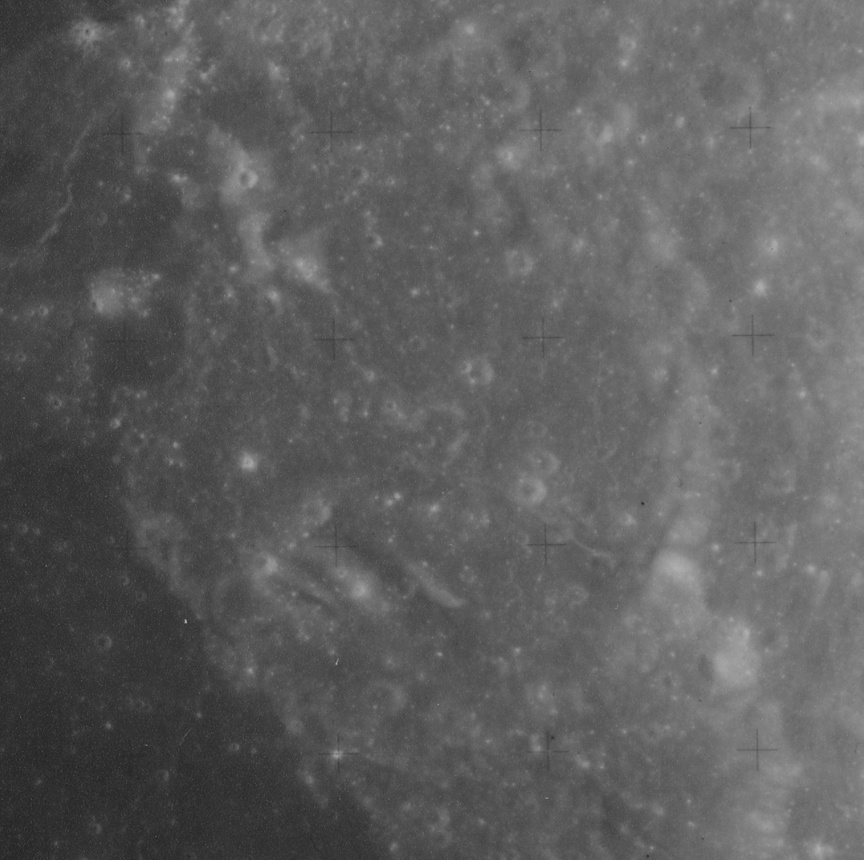
Apollo 16 Mapping Camera image, mostly showing albedo differences

McAdie is a flooded lunar impact crater that is located along the northeastern edge of Mare Smythii, on the far side of the Moon. It lies just to the southwest of the larger, flooded Babcock. During periods of favorable libration and illumination, this area can be viewed from the Earth, although it is seen from the edge and not much detail can be discerned.

The interior of this crater has been submerged by basaltic lava, leaving only a portion of the rim projecting partially out of the surface. The rim has a break along the northwest edge, and a small craterlet lies in this opening. The interior floor is level, but a minor (unnamed) rille crosses the center of the crater roughly from east to west. The contrast in albedo of the basalt in the crater versus the basalt within Mare Smythii to the west is obvious.
