= Alexander Zasyadko (general) =

Imperial Russian army general

- Александр Дмитриевич Засядко
- Born: 1779; Lyutenka, Gadyachsky Uyezd, Poltava Governorate, Russian Empire
- Died: 8 June [O.S. 27 May] 1837; Kharkiv, Russian Empire
- Burial place: Kuryazh Transfiguration Monastery
- Military career
- Allegiance: Russian Empire
- Branch: Artillery
- Service years: 1797–1834
- Rank: Lieutenant general
- Known for: Developments in rocket artillery

Alexander Dmitrievich Zasyadko (Russian: Александр Дмитриевич Засядко; Ukrainian: Олександр Дмитрович Засядько; 1779 – 8 June [O.S. 27 May] 1837) was a Russian general of Cossack origin. A military engineer, he played an important role in the development of rocket artillery in Russia.

== Biography ==
Zasyadko was born into a Cossack (his father had been the head of artillery of the Zaporozhian Cossacks) family in the village of Lyutenka, in the Poltava Governorate. In 1797, Zasyadko graduated from the Artillery and Engineering Szlachta Cadet Corps in Saint Petersburg (today the building of the Cadet Corps hosts the A.F. Mozhaysky Military-Space Academy).

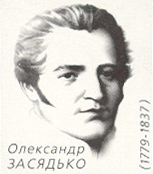
Zasyadko on a Ukrainian stamp

In 1815, Zasyadko began his work on military gunpowder rockets. He built rocket-launching platforms, which allowed to fire in salvos (6 rockets at a time), and gun-laying devices, and also developed a tactics for the military use of rocket weaponry. In 1820, Zasyadko was appointed head of the Petersburg Armory, the Okhtensky Powder Factory, a pyrotechnic laboratory, and the first Higher Artillery School in Russia. In 1826 he was appointed chief of staff of the Russian artillery. The following year he was in charge of the Artillery Headquarters of the Russian army and took part in the Russo-Turkish War of 1828-1829, in which his rockets played an important role during the sieges of Brăila and Varna.

Zasyadko organised the development and production of rockets in a specialised workshop, and created the first rocket sub-unit in the Russian Imperial Army. Promoted to lieutenant general in 1829, due to ill health he retired from active service in 1834, settling in the Kharkiv area, where his wife's estate was located. He died in 1837.

== Legacy and commemoration ==
- The crater Zasyadko on the far side of the Moon is named after him.
- In 2003 a stamp in honour of Zasyadko was issued in Ukraine.
