= Luiz Henrique (footballer, born 1992) =

Brazilian footballer

Personal information
- Full name: Luiz Henrique Sales de Souza
- Date of birth: 11 October 1992
- Place of birth: Fortaleza, Brazil
- Date of death: 30 June 2025 (aged 32)
- Place of death: Fortaleza, Brazil
- Height: 1.79 m (5 ft 10 in)
- Position: Midfielder

Youth career
- Ceará

Senior career*
Years	Team	Apps	(Gls)
2010	Ferroviário		
2011	Palmeiras B		
2011	Grêmio Barueri		
2011	Grêmio		
2012–2014	Ceará	37	(0)
2012	→ Flamengo-PI (loan)		
2013	→ Mirassol (loan)		
- * Club domestic league appearances and goals as of 30 June 2025

Luiz Henrique Sales de Souza (11 October 1992 – 30 June 2025) was a Brazilian professional footballer who played as a midfielder.

== Career ==
Revealed in the youth sector of Ceará SC, Luiz Henrique played professionally for Ferroviário, Palmeiras B, Grêmio Barueri and Grêmio. In 2012 he returned to Ceará, where he was part of the three-time state championship. He also had loan spells with Flamengo-PI and Mirassol. Luiz Henrique ended his career after the 2014 season.

== Honours ==
Ceará

- Campeonato Cearense: 2012, 2013, 2014

== Death ==
The player's death was announced on Ceará SC's social media on 30 June 2025, without revealing the cause of death. A tribute before the match against Sport Recife was scheduled for July 9.
