= Luis Enrique Erro =

Mexican astronomer and politician

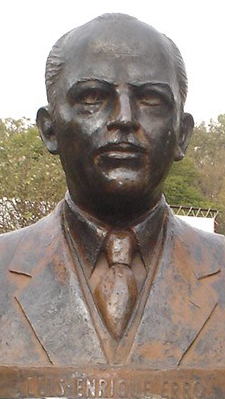
- Bust at the Instituto Politécnico Nacional

Deputy of the Congress of the Union for the 2nd district of the Federal District
- In office 1 September 1934 – 31 August 1937
- Preceded by: José Morales Hesse
- Succeeded by: Salvador Ochoa Rentería

Personal details
- Born: 7 January 1897 Mexico City, D.F., Mexico
- Died: 18 January 1955 (aged 58) Mexico City, D.F., Mexico

Luis Enrique Erro Soler (7 January 1897 – 18 January 1955) was a Mexican astronomer, politician, and educational reformer.

Born in Mexico City, Erro studied civil engineering and accounting, among other subjects. He occupied the post of head of the Department of Technical Education until 1934. He revamped Mexico’s system of technical education in 1932, when he established the Advanced School of Mechanical Engineers and Electricians (Escuela Superior de Ingenieros Mecánicos y Electricistas) and the Advanced School of Construction (Escuela Superior de Construcción). He also helped create the National Polytechnic Institute in 1936. Elected to Congress in 1934 for National Revolutionary Party (PRM) in the Federal District's 2nd district, he served as the President of the Chamber of Deputies in 1938. At the conclusion of his congressional term in 1937, he joined the diplomatic corps and was assigned to the U.S. city of Boston, Massachusetts, where he also pursued studies at Harvard University's astronomical observatory.

In 1940, he was invited to become a member of the administration of President Manuel Ávila Camacho, with whom he collaborated on a project to build the Tonantzintla Observatory in San Andrés Cholula, Puebla, where favorable atmospheric conditions for astronomical studies existed. He renounced his post as director of this observatory in 1947 and returned to Mexico City, where he dedicated himself to writing articles on astronomy for the newspaper Excélsior. As an amateur astronomer, he is also noted for his study of southern variable stars.

Due to a heart condition, he was interned for several weeks in 1951, during which time he wrote a novel, Los pies descalzos ("Bare feet"), which concerns Emiliano Zapata. Erro died of heart attack in Mexico City in 1955, and his ashes were interred at the Tonantzintla Observatory.

The Planetario Luis Enrique Erro, a planetarium in Mexico City, is named after him, as is lunar crater Erro.

== Sources ==
- (in Spanish) Luis Enrique Erro
