= Nikolay Moiseyev =

Soviet astronomer (1902–1955)

- Николай Моисеев
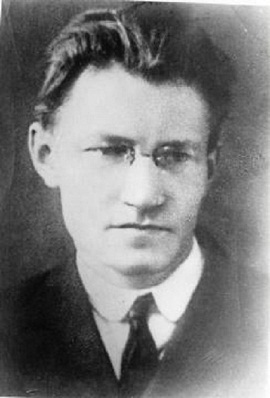
- Born: 3 December [O.S. 20 November] 1902; Perm, Russian Empire
- Died: December 6, 1955 (aged 52); Moscow, Soviet Union
- Resting place: Vagankovo Cemetery
- Education: Moscow State University
- Occupation: Astronomer
- Awards: Order of Lenin; Order of the Red Star; Order of the Great Patriotic War
- Scientific career
- Workplaces: Sternberg Astronomical Institute; Zhukovsky Air Force Engineering Academy
- Academic advisors: Sergei Orlov
- Notable students: Hajibey Sultanov

Nikolay Dmitriyevich Moiseyev (Russian: Никола́й Дми́триевич Моисе́ев; December 3(16), 1902 in Perm – December 6, 1955 in Moscow) was a Soviet astronomer and expert in celestial mechanics. In 1938, he became the chairman of the department of celestial mechanics at Moscow State University and worked on this position until his death. His main works were devoted to mathematical methods of celestial calculations and theory of comet formation.

He also taught higher mathematics in Zhukovsky Air Force Engineering Academy and was a colonel-engineer of Air forces. He was the director of State Astronomic Institute named by Sternberg (1939-1943) and organized the national system of radio-signals for the exact time.

His awards include Order of Lenin, Order of the Great Patriotic War and two Red Stars.

The crater Moiseev on the Moon is named after him. A minor planet 3080 Moisseiev discovered by Soviet astronomer Pelageya Shajn in 1935 is named after him.
