= Planetario Luis Enrique Erro =

Coordinates: 19°29′48.4″N 99°08′23.6″W

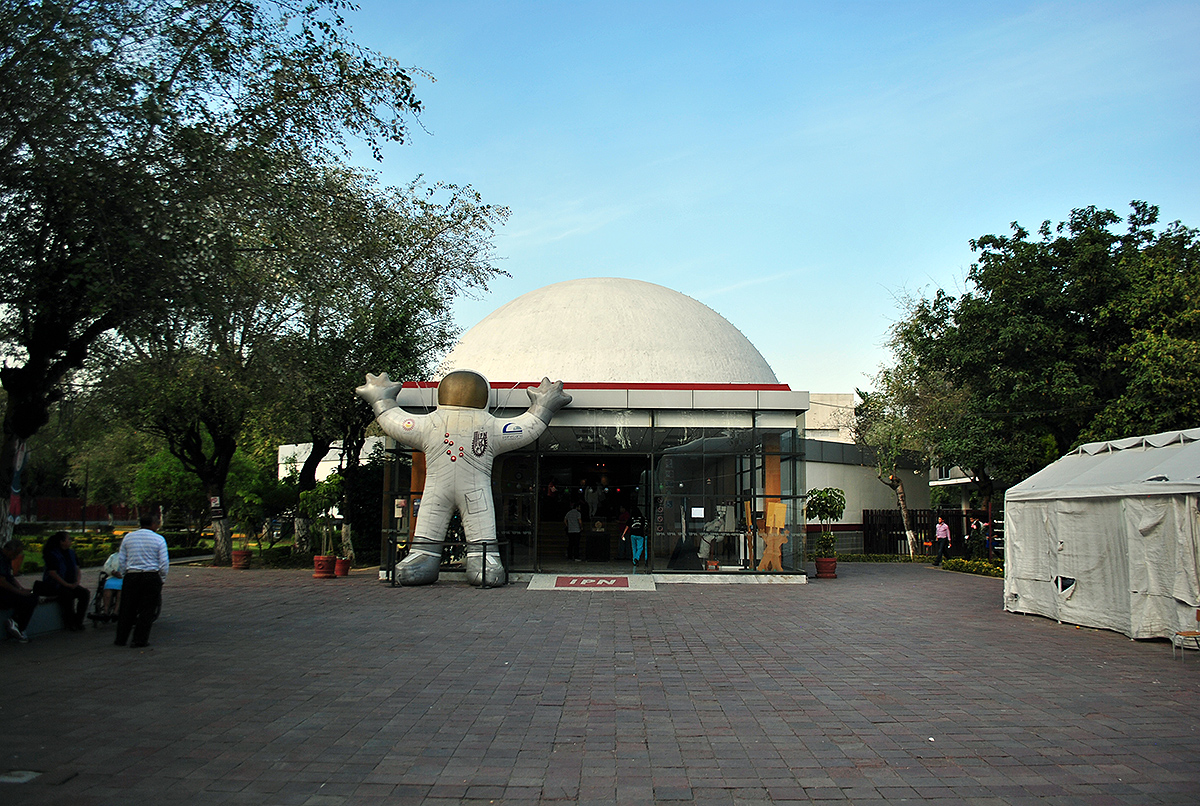
- Established: January 1967
- Location: Mexico City, Mexico
- Type: Science museum
- Visitors: 309,000 (2008)
- Public transit access: Metro Politécnico; Metro Lindavista
- Website: www.planetario.ipn.mx

Planetario Luis Enrique Erro is a planetarium located in Mexico City, owned and operated by the National Polytechnic Institute. It was the first planetarium in Mexico open to the public and is one of the oldest in Latin America. It was opened in 1967 and operated for over 39 years with a planetarium projector model Mark 4.

It was reopened to the public on 15 January 2007 after renovation, and modernization costing about 43 million pesos. Its innovations include a stellar dome and new E&S Digistar 3 digital projection systems.
