= Moiseev (crater) =

Lunar impact crater

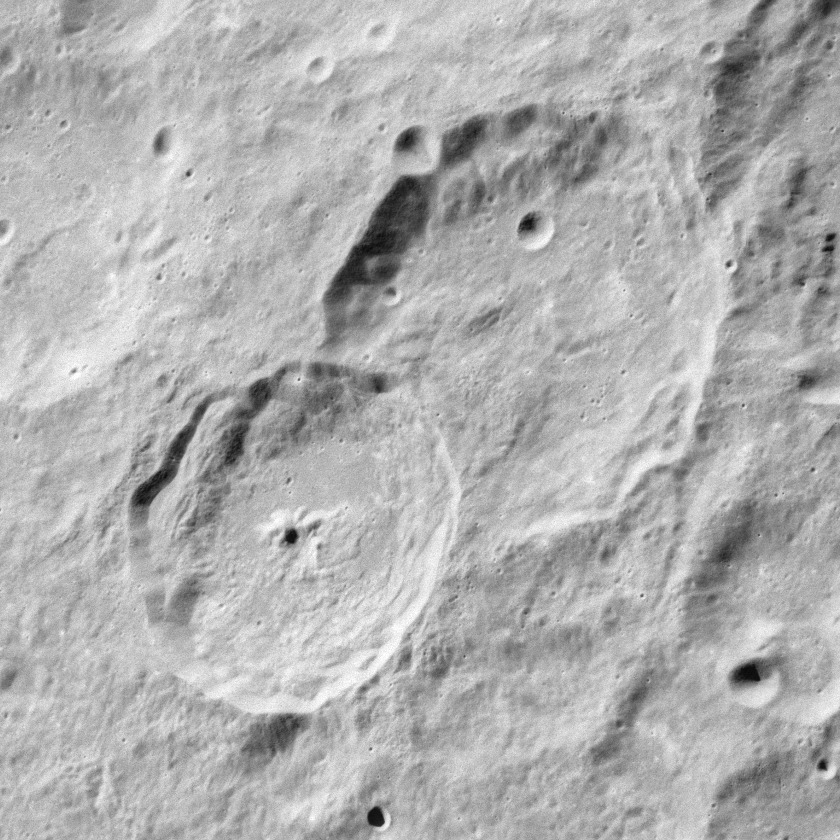
- Oblique Apollo 16 mapping camera image, with Moiseev in lower left and Moiseev Z in upper right
- Coordinates: 9.5°N 103.3°E
- Diameter: 59 km
- Colongitude: 254° at sunrise
- Eponym: Nikolay Moiseyev

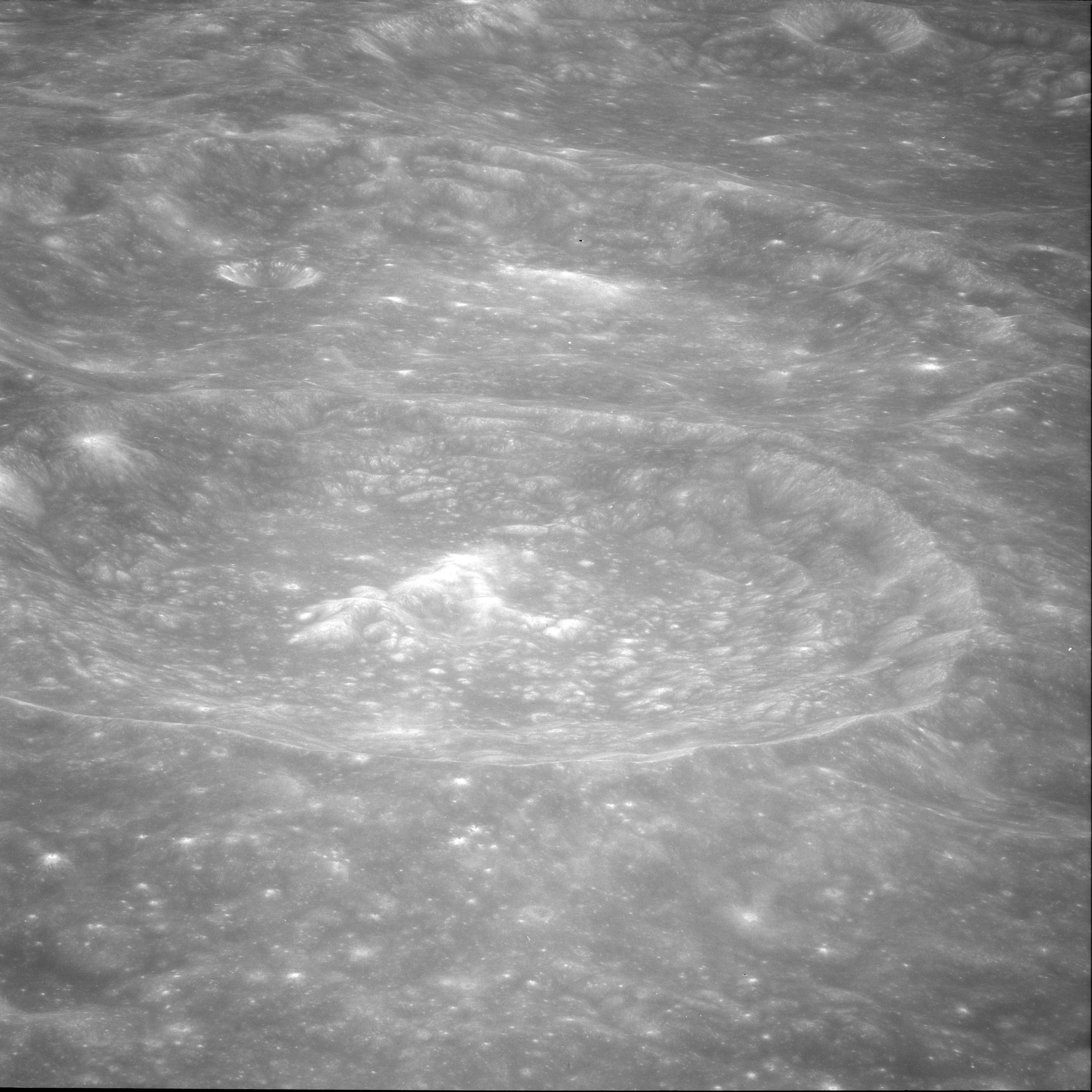
Moiseev crater (center) and Moiseev Z (behind it). From Apollo 11

Moiseev is a lunar impact crater that is located just on the far side of the Moon. It lies to the south-southwest of the slightly larger crater Hertz, and north of Saenger. To the southeast lies the irregular crater Al-Khwarizmi.

Moiseev overlies the southern rim of the larger satellite formation Moiseev Z. The crater is not significantly worn, and is marked only by a few tiny craterlets in the interior. The rim is generally circular, but has an outward bulge and a wider interior wall to the west-southwest. There are some terrace structures around the inner eastern wall, while the western inner wall has more of a slumped appearance. At the midpoint of the flattened interior is a formation of low hills forming the crater's central peak complex.

The crater is named after Soviet astronomer Nikolay Moiseyev. Prior to naming in 1970 by the IAU, Moiseev was known as Crater 198, and Moiseev Z was known as Crater 197.

== Satellite craters ==
By convention these features are identified on lunar maps by placing the letter on the side of the crater midpoint that is closest to Moiseev.

Moiseev	Latitude	Longitude	Diameter
S	8.7° N	100.7° E	29 km
Z	11.2° N	103.4° E	80 km
