= Retrato de Luis Muñoz Marín =

Painting by Francisco Rodón

- Artist: Francisco Rodón
- Year: 1974–1977
- Medium: Oil on canvas
- Location: Luis Muñoz Marín Foundation; San Juan, Puerto Rico

Retrato de Luis Muñoz Marín (Portrait of Luis Muñoz Marín) is a 1977 oil painting by the Puerto Rican artist Francisco Rodón of the first democratically elected governor of Puerto Rico.

== Work of Rodón ==
The work is one of the most recognized paintings of Rodón, capturing the psychological portrait of Luis Muñoz Marín after leaving office. The portrait is the culmination of the Rodon's series called "Personajes".

In September 1974, Rodón began the portrait in Muñoz Marín's residence in Trujillo Alto. The sessions lasted until the end of that year. The portrait helps appreciate the personal style of Rodón, that despite his travels and studies abroad resisted identification with any particular style. According to Muñoz Marin, "The picture captured the feeling of a phase of my life in which, recalling the past, I grieved not to have done or not being able to do much more than what I've done."

In 1992, the portrait was part of the art exhibit in the Pavilion of Puerto Rico at the Seville Expo '92. The painting is part of the Luis Muñoz Marín Foundation's permanent collection.
