= Luís Henrique =

Luís Henrique may refer to:

- Luís Henrique (footballer, born 1960), Luís Henrique Dias, Brazilian football goalkeeper
- Luís Henrique (footballer, born 1968), Luís Henrique Pereira dos Santos, Brazilian football midfielder
- Luis Henrique (fighter) (born 1993), Brazilian mixed martial artist
- Luís Henrique (footballer, born 1998), Luís Henrique Farinhas Taffner, Brazilian football forward
- Luis Henrique (footballer, born 2001), Luis Henrique Tomaz de Lima, Brazilian football forward

== See also ==
- Luis Enrique (disambiguation)
