= Babcock (crater) =

Crater on the Moon

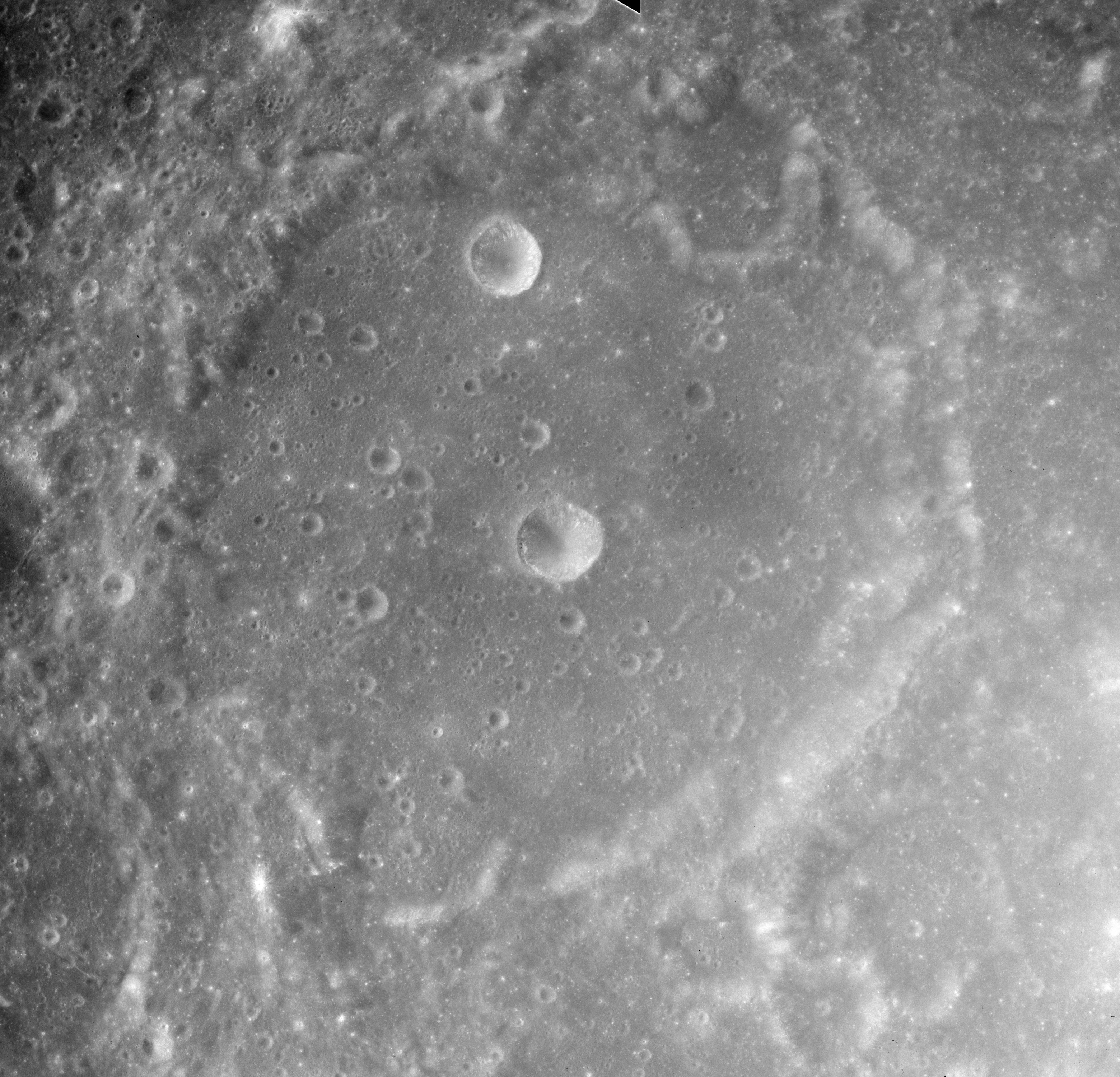
- Apollo 16 Mapping Camera image
- Coordinates: 4.13°N 94.14°E
- Diameter: 95.28 km (59.20 mi)
- Depth: 2.3 km (1.4 mi)
- Colongitude: 267° at sunrise
- Eponym: Harold D. Babcock

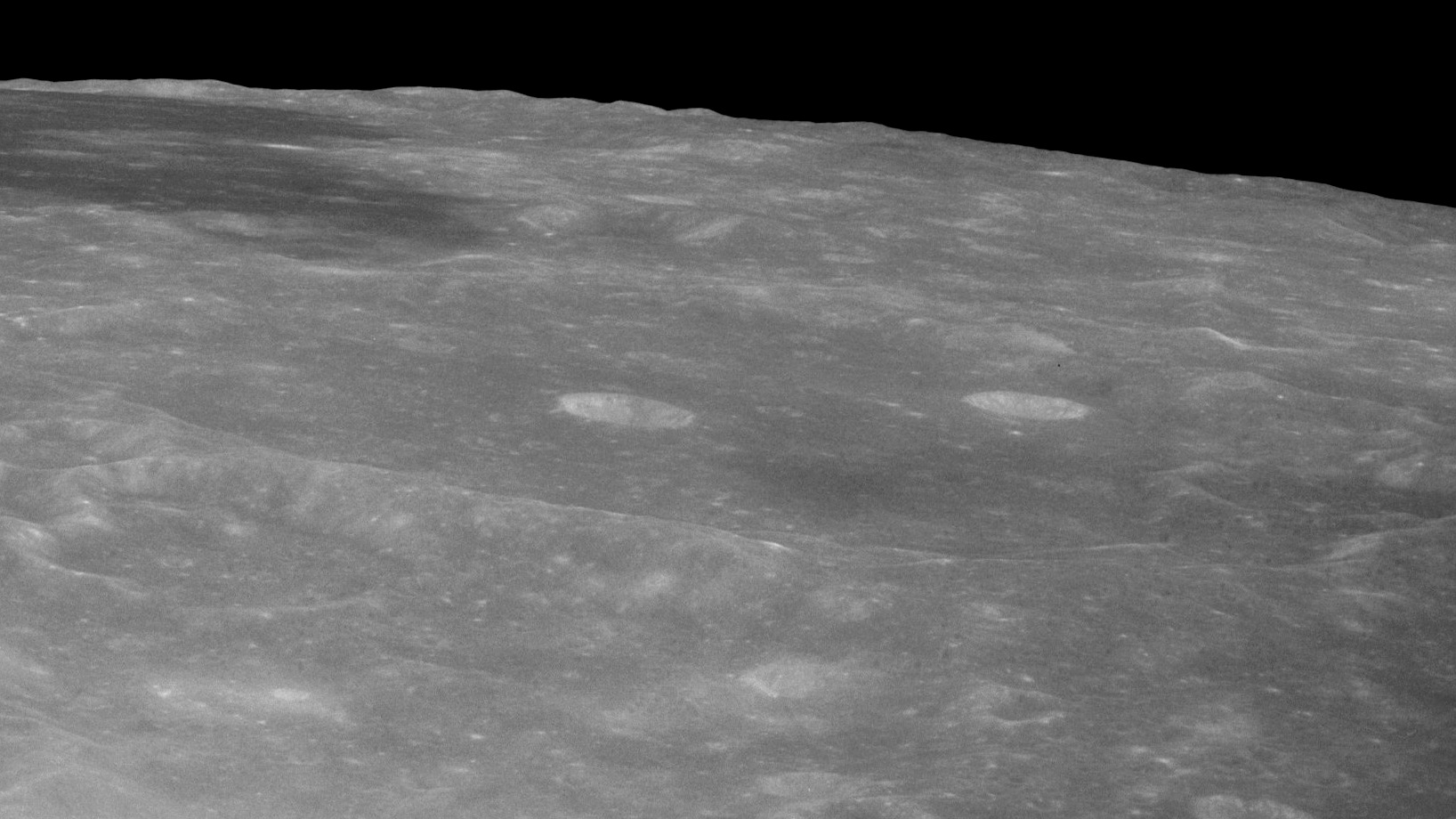
Oblique view of Babcock, facing west, with Mare Smythii in upper left, from Apollo 11

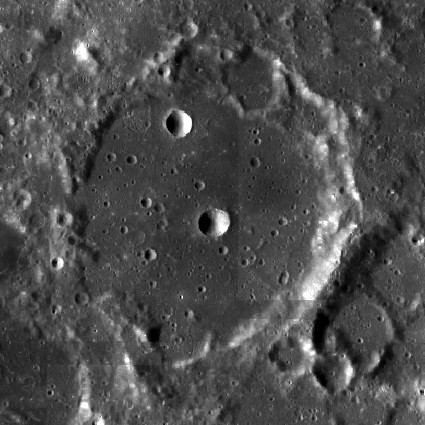
LRO image

Babcock is a lunar impact crater that is located on the far side of the Moon. It lies on the northeastern edge of Mare Smythii, to the southeast of Mare Marginis. To the south of Babcock is the crater Purkynĕ, and to the east-northeast lies Erro. Babcock is located in a region of the Moon's surface that is occasionally brought into view during favorable librations, although it is seen from the edge and so little detail can be discerned from an observer on the Earth.

The rim of Babcock has been eroded, notched and modified by subsequent impacts, leaving a somewhat irregular and uneven outer rim. The interior has been resurfaced by mare materials, and is relatively flat. In place of a central peak, a small crater designated Zasyadko lies very close to the crater midpoint. A smaller crater lies on the interior near the northern edge.

The plains material in and around Babcock has a moderate albedo that is typically darker than the surrounding material. It contains higher concentrations of titanium, iron, magnesium, and thorium than is typical for the region. The area about Babcock has been subject to past inundations by basaltic lava flows, leaving the surface relatively flat and the remnants of ghost craters visible as curved ridges in the ground.

This crater is named after American astronomer Harold D. Babcock (1882-1968). Its designation was formally adopted by the International Astronomical Union in 1970.

== Satellite craters ==
By convention these features are identified on lunar maps by placing the letter on the side of the crater midpoint that is closest to Babcock.

Babcock	Latitude	Longitude	Diameter
H	3.0° N	96.5° E	63 km
K	1.2° N	95.2° E	10 km
