= Harold D. Babcock =

American astronomer (1882–1968)

Harold Delos Babcock
- Babcock at the Fourth Conference International Union for Cooperation in Solar Research at Mount Wilson Observatory, 1910
- Born: 24 January 1882; Edgerton, Wisconsin, US
- Died: 8 April 1968 (aged 86); Pasadena, California, US
- Education: University of California, Berkeley
- Awards: Bruce Medal
- Scientific career
- Fields: Solar spectroscopy
- Workplaces: Mount Wilson Observatory

Harold Delos Babcock (January 24, 1882 – April 8, 1968) was an American astronomer. He was of English and German ancestry. He was born in Edgerton, Wisconsin, before completing high school in Los Angeles and was accepted to the University of California, Berkeley in 1901. He studied electrical engineering and graduated in 1907. After that he worked briefly for NIST, and as an instructor in Berkeley, until he was proposed a position at the Mount Wilson Observatory. He worked there from 1909 until 1948.

Babcock specialized in solar spectroscopy and precisely mapped the distribution of magnetic fields over the Sun's surface, working alongside his son, Horace W. Babcock. He developed the "ruling engine which has made many of the finest diffraction gratings" and, together with his son, the solar magnetograph.

In 1953 Babcock won the Bruce Medal. Babcock died of a heart attack in Pasadena, California at age 86.

The crater Babcock on the Moon is named after him, as is asteroid 3167 Babcock (jointly named after him and his son).
