= Ginzel (crater) =

Crater on the Moon

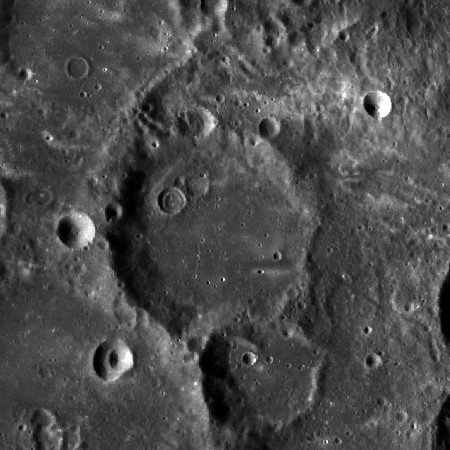
- Ginzel crater and its satellite crater Ginzel L to the south
- Coordinates: 14.3°N 97.4°E
- Diameter: 55 km
- Depth: Unknown
- Colongitude: 263° at sunrise
- Eponym: Friedrich K. Ginzel

Ginzel is a lunar impact crater that is located on the far side of the Moon, just beyond the eastern limb. It is named after the Austrian astronomer Friedrich Karl Ginzel. It lies at the eastern edge of the Mare Marginis, in a region of the surface that is sometimes brought into sight of the Earth due to libration. To the north-northeast of Ginzel is the crater Popov, and Dreyer lies due south.

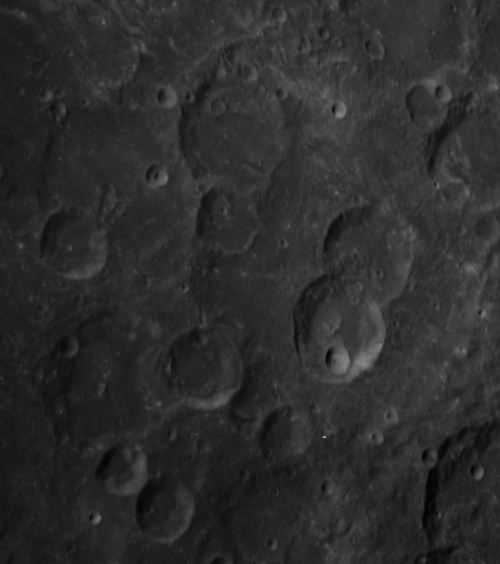
Oblique Apollo 14 Hasselblad camera image Dreyer and Ginzel and several of their satellite craters. From center, Ginzel is at approximately 12:00, and Dreyer is at approximately 8:00. Ginzel G and H are at 3:00 and 4:00. Ginzel L is due south of Ginzel.

Much of the rim and interior of Ginzel have been flooded by basalt, leaving only a faint trace of the rim in the otherwise relatively level surface. The western rim projects more prominently above the surrounding irregular plain. The flooded satellite crater Ginzel L is attached to the southern part of the rim, and a small crater lies across the rim to the north. Within the interior is a pair of joined small craters in the western half. The interior is otherwise nearly featureless.

== Satellite craters ==
By convention these features are identified on lunar maps by placing the letter on the side of the crater midpoint that is closest to Ginzel.

Ginzel	Latitude	Longitude	Diameter
G	13.7° N	100.2° E	42 km
H	12.7° N	100.1° E	50 km
L	13.1° N	97.8° E	28 km
