= Luis Enrique Muñoz =

Mexican footballer (born 1988)

Luis Enrique Muñóz
Personal information
- Full name: Luis Enrique Muñóz Medina
- Date of birth: 21 July 1988 (age 38)
- Place of birth: San Luis Potosí, Mexico
- Height: 1.80 m (5 ft 11 in)
- Position: Defender

Senior career*
Years	Team	Apps	(Gls)
2005–2009	Puebla	29	(0)
- * Club domestic league appearances and goals

Luis Enrique Muñóz Medina (Note: In this Spanish name, the first or paternal surname is Muñóz and the second or maternal family name is Medina.) (born 21 July 1988) is a Mexican former footballer.
