= Friedrich Karl Ginzel =

Austrian astronomer (1850–1926)

Friedrich Karl Ginzel (26 February 1850 – 29 June 1926) was an Austrian astronomer.

From 1877 Ginzel worked at the observatory in Vienna. In 1886, he became a member of the Königlichen Astronomischen Recheninstituts in Berlin, where he was offered a professorship in 1899.

In 1899 he published an important study on solar and lunar eclipses in classical antiquity. His three-volume Handbuch der mathematischen und technischen Chronologie (1906–14; reprinted in 1958 and 2007) is still a standard work on calendars and ancient chronology although some sections are now outdated.

He was awarded the Valz Prize by the French Academy of Sciences in 1884 for his work on solar eclipses. The lunar crater Ginzel was named after him.
