= Vladimir Moiseyev (footballer) =

Russian footballer

Personal information
- Full name: Vladimir Aleksandrovich Moiseyev
- Date of birth: 9 February 1988 (age 38)
- Height: 1.90 m (6 ft 3 in)
- Position: Defender

Senior career*
Years	Team	Apps	(Gls)
2005	FC Anzhi-Khazar Makhachkala (amateur)		
2005–2007	FC Anzhi Makhachkala	14	(0)
2008	FC Sheksna-2 Cherepovets		
2008–2009	FC Sheksna Cherepovets	14	(0)
2010	FC Dynamo Stavropol	6	(0)
- * Club domestic league appearances and goals

Vladimir Aleksandrovich Moiseyev (Russian: Владимир Александрович Моисеев; born 9 February 1988) is a former Russian professional football player.

== Club career ==
He made his Russian Football National League debut for FC Anzhi Makhachkala on 7 October 2005 in a game against FC Oryol. He played 3 seasons in the FNL for Anzhi.
