= Vladimir Moiseyev (windsurfer) =

Russian windsurfer

Personal information
- Nationality: Russian
- Born: 26 March 1972 (age 54) Taganrog, Russia

Sport
- Sport: Windsurfing

Vladimir Moiseyev (born 26 March 1972) is a Russian windsurfer. He competed at the 1996 Summer Olympics, the 2000 Summer Olympics, and the 2004 Summer Olympics.
