= Promontorium Deville =

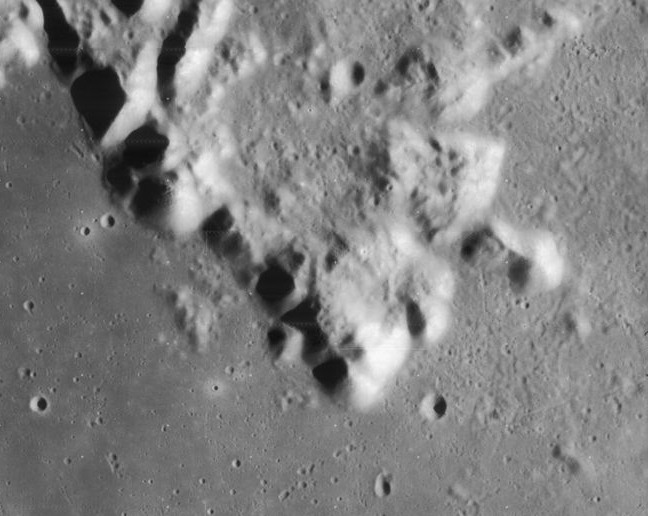
Promontorium Deville (left of center) and Promontorium Agassiz (below center), from Lunar Orbiter 4

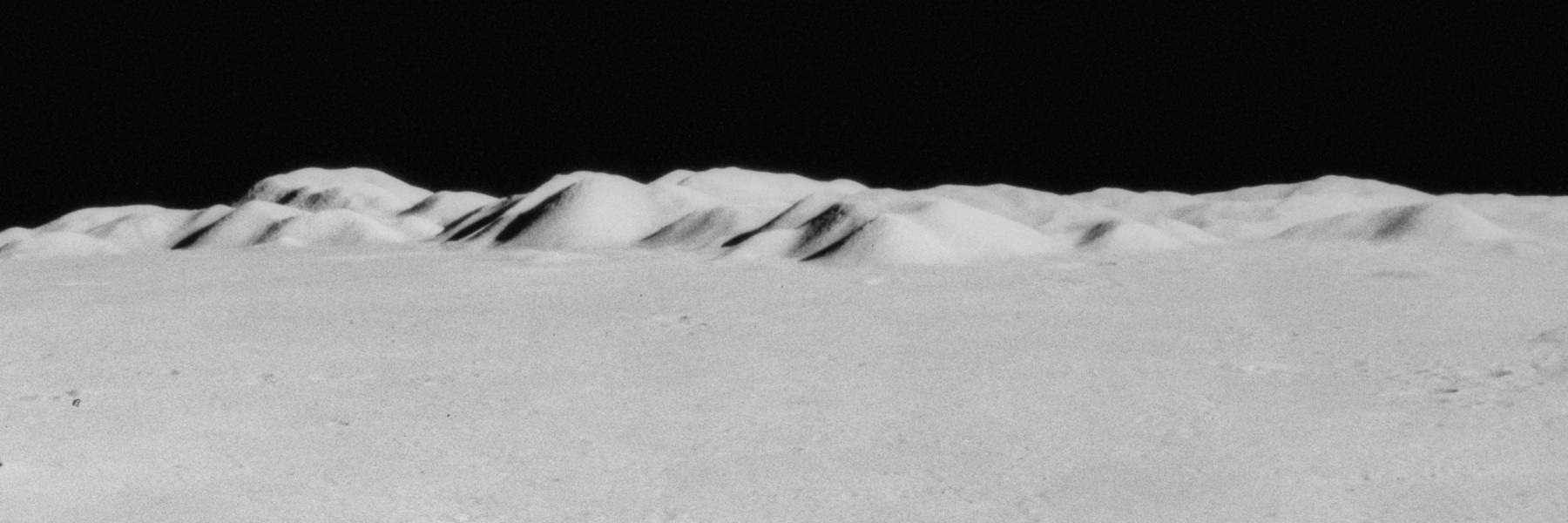
Oblique view showing Promontorium Agassiz (right), Promontorium Deville (left of center), and Mont Blanc (left, highest peak). From Apollo 15.

Promontorium Deville is a mountainous cape situated on the northeast margin of Mare Imbrium on the near side of the Moon. Its selenographic coordinates are 43.31° N, 1.14° E. It is located north of Promontorium Agassiz, south of Mont Blanc, northeast of Mons Piton, and northwest of Cassini crater.

Promontorium Deville is named after Charles Joseph Sainte-Claire Deville, a French meteorologist and geologist. The name of the feature was approved by the IAU in 1935.

== Promontorium Deville during full moon ==
The brightness of the slopes of Promontorium Deville, as seen during full moon, is also noticeable on the photographic version of chart LAC 25 (page 50) in The Clementine Atlas of the Moon.
