= Jessica Duncan Piazzi Smyth =

British geologist

- Born: 1812; Aberdeen
- Died: 24 March 1896 (aged 83–84); Ripon
- Spouse: Charles Piazzi Smyth (m. 1855)

Jessica Duncan Piazzi Smyth (1812 – 24 March 1896) made geological tours of the British Isles and Europe, and travelled to Egypt, Tenerife, and throughout the Mediterranean on scientific expeditions with her husband, Charles Piazzi Smyth, the Astronomer Royal for Scotland.

== Life ==
Jessica "Jessie" Duncan was born in Aberdeen the daughter of Thomas Duncan and Jannet Young. Her father was a lawyer; after his death, Jessie Duncan was raised at Clova, the home of her stepfather, Harry Keith Lumsden, in the village of Lumsden. When Lumsden died in 1844, Jessie and her mother moved to Edinburgh. She studied geology with Alexander Rose of the Edinburgh Geological Society. As a single woman in her thirties, Jessie Duncan joined geological field trips around the British Isles, and travelled as far from home as Switzerland and Italy in her scientific pursuits. She attended the British Association for the Advancement of Science meeting in Belfast in 1852.

She married Charles Piazzi Smyth in December 1855, and the two travelled the next year to Tenerife, to visit the peak of the highest mountain and assess its potential for an astronomical observatory. Together, the Piazzi Smyths travelled around the Mediterranean and Northern Africa, making astronomical observations, often in mountainous locations. Jessie kept the notes and sketches for their expeditions, learned to prepare and preserve local foods, and was otherwise a constant assistant to her husband's work. "Her love of scientific travel was equal to Piazzi's own," notes biographer Mary T. Brück. She was also skilled at early photographic processes, and she printed hundreds of photographs used in Piazzi Smyth's reports and publications. Almost entirely at their own expense, she and Charles sailed in November 1864 to Egypt and spent four months living in a tent beside the Great Pyramid of Giza. There they completed the most thorough survey of that monument to date, backed up by photographs of both exterior and interior.

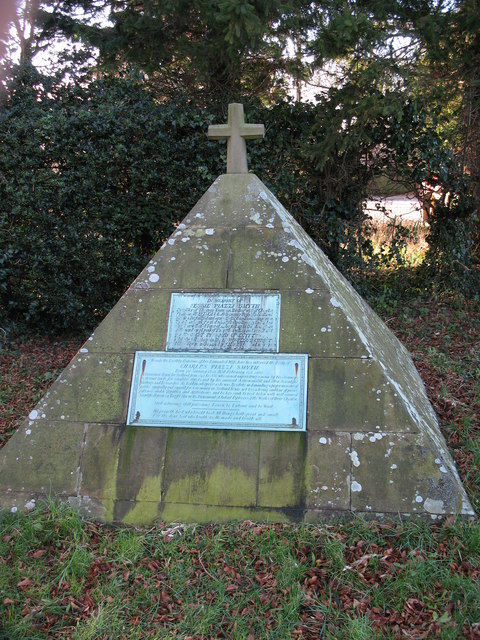
Pyramid Tombstone in Sharow Churchyard - geograph.org.uk - 327872.

The couple retired to Ripon in 1888, and Jessie Piazzi Smyth died there in 1896, aged 81. There is an unusual pyramid-shaped monument to both Piazzi Smyths, in the churchyard at St. John's, Sharow, North Yorkshire.
