= Montes Alpes =

Mountain range on the Moon

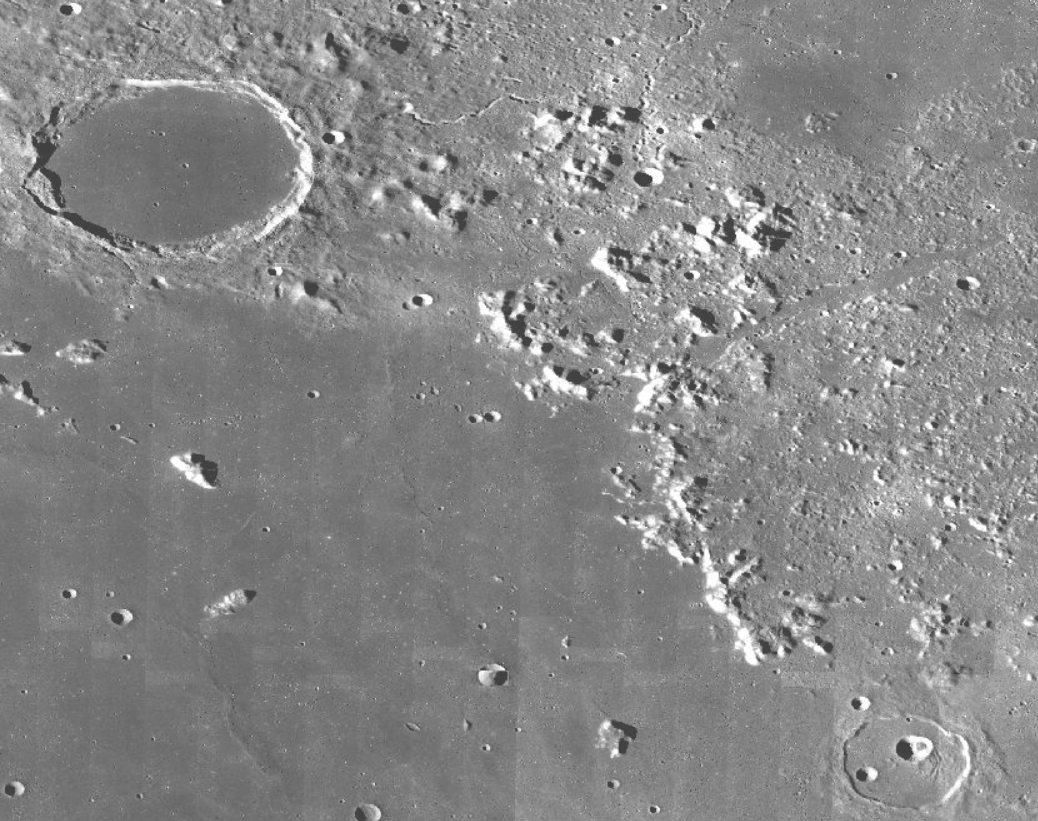
- Image of Montes Alpes taken from Lunar Reconnaissance Orbiter data. The range lies in the arc between Plato crater, upper left, and Cassini crater, lower right. Mons Piton is visible to the left of Cassini at center-right.

Highest point
- Listing: Lunar mountains
- Coordinates: 48.36°N 0.58°W

Geography
- Location: Moon

Montes Alpes is a mountain range in the northern part of the Moon's near side. It was named after the Alps in Europe; the name was confirmed by the International Astronomical Union in 1935. It lies between the selenographic coordinates latitudes 52.81°N and 42.04°N, and longitudes 5.6°W and 3.22°E. The range thus crosses the lunar prime meridian, and is partially illuminated and partially in shadow during first and last quarters. The center of the range is at 48.36°N, 0.58°W, and has a diameter of 334 km.

== Description ==
This range forms the northeastern border of the Mare Imbrium lunar mare. To the west of the range is the level and nearly featureless mare, while on the eastern face is a more rugged continental area with a higher albedo. The range begins about one crater diameter northwest of the crater Cassini, at the Promontorium Agassiz, then stretches about 280 kilometres to the northwest and continues in intermittent fashion and the mountains proper end shy of one crater length from the eastern rim of the dark-floored crater Plato. The system of rilles named Rimae Plato may be found in between the eastern edge of Plato and the western edge of the Alpes mountains. The peaks of the Alpes range in height from 1,800m to 2,400m.

The Alpes range was part of the middle ring of the multi-ringed Imbrium Basin. The other mountain ranges around the Imbrium Basin (Montes Caucasus, Montes Apenninus, and Montes Carpatus) were part of the outer ring. The Alpes, being part of the middle ring, thus have a shorter radius to the center of Imbrium than the other ranges of the basin.

The northwestern third of the range is separated from the remainder of the mountains by the Vallis Alpes, a wide rift valley that extends from a narrow cleft in the Montes Alpes to the northeast, reaching the edge of the Mare Frigoris. The total length of this formation is about 166 km, and it reaches a maximum width of 10 km. Running down the center of this valley is a narrow cleft which is not observable through smaller telescopes. Sunrise and sunset in this area occur before the respective lunar quarters.

About one-third the length of the range from the southeast is Mons Blanc, a peak rising to a height of 3.6 km. This compares to a typical height of peaks in this range of 1.8 to 2.4 km. Midway between Mons Blanc and Promontorium Agassiz is Promontorium Deville. To the southwest of Promontorium Agassiz is the isolated Mons Piton, a peak rising to a height of 2.3 km. Blanc, Piton, and the Montes Teneriffe make up part of the inner ring of the Imbrium Basin.

== Gallery ==
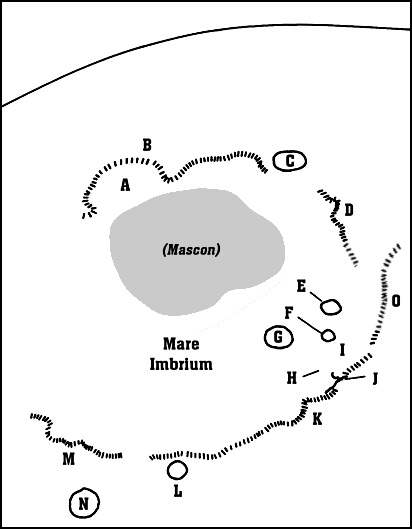
Detail map of Mare Imbrium's features. Montes Alpes is the feature marked "D"

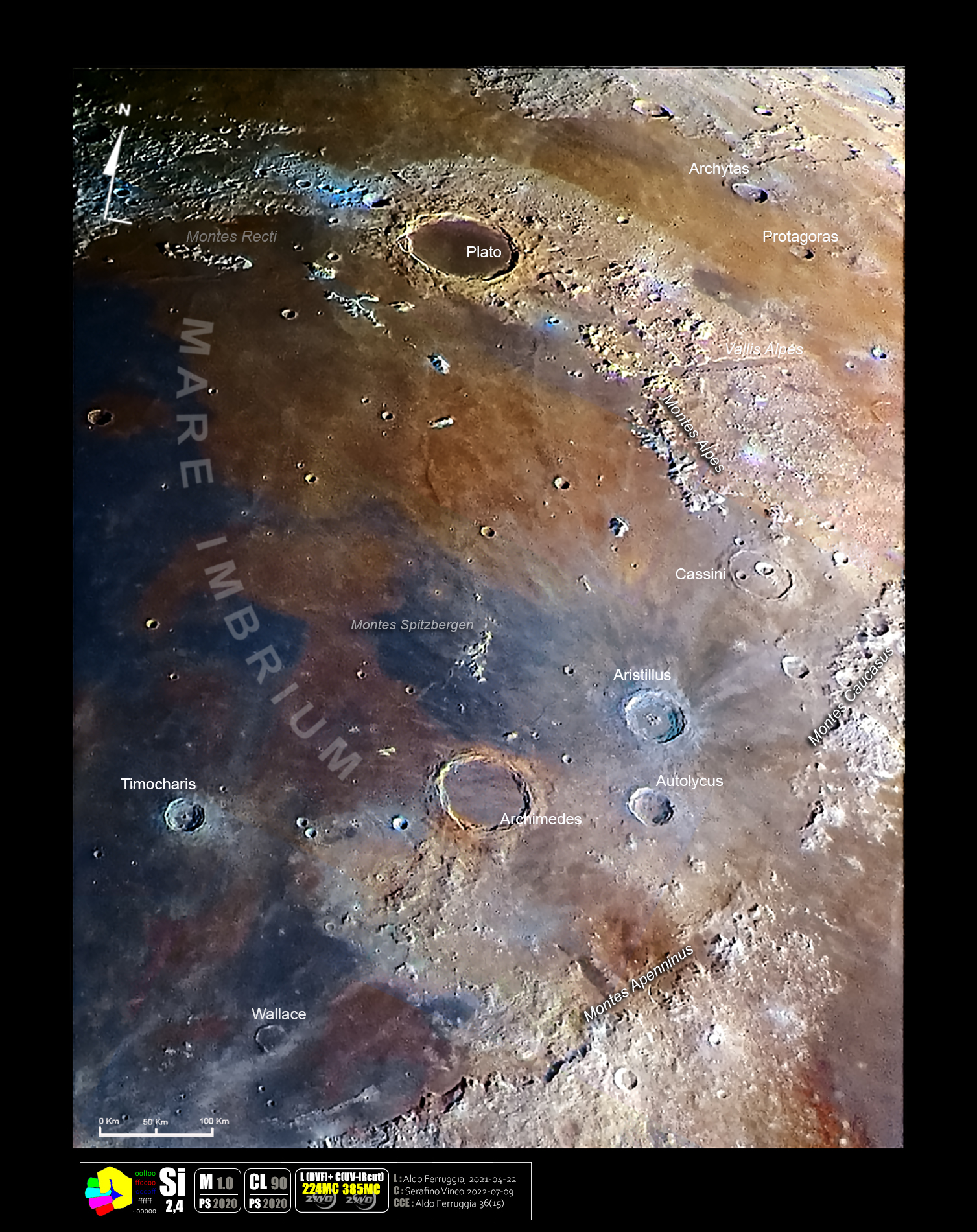
Montes Alpes Area in a Selenochromnatic Image (Si)

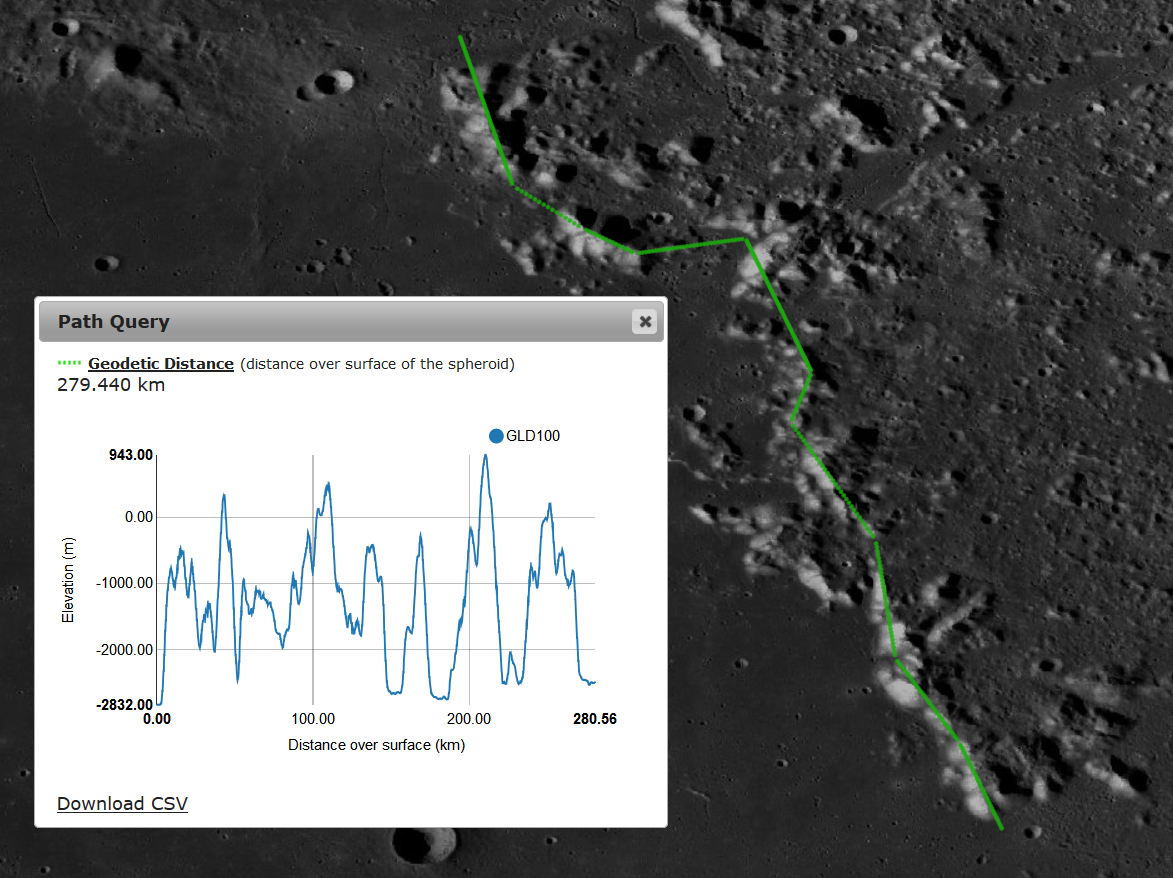
A line trace of Montes Alpes showing the elevations of the range (from right to left)

== See also ==
- List of mountains on the Moon
