= Promontorium Agassiz =

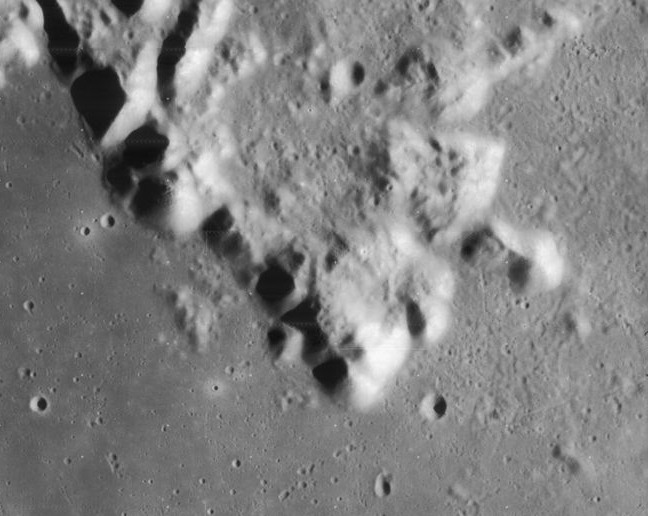
Promontorium Agassiz (below center) and Promontorium Deville (left of center), from Lunar Orbiter 4

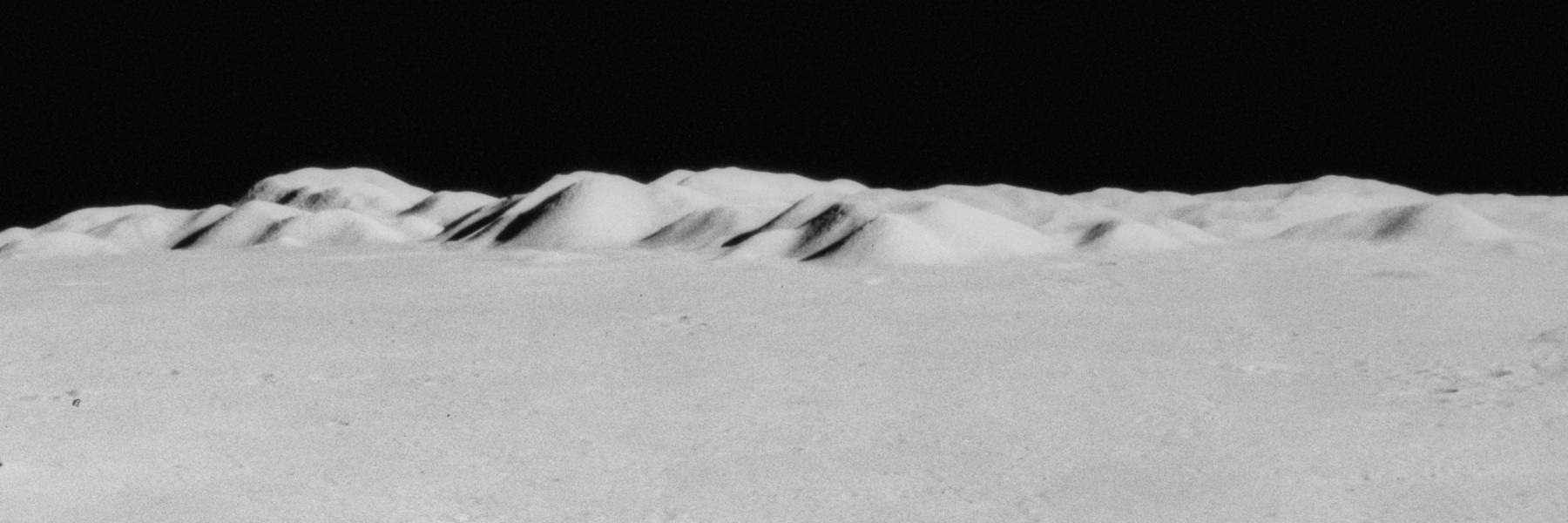
Oblique view showing Promontorium Agassiz (right), Promontorium Deville (left of center), and Mont Blanc (left, highest peak). From Apollo 15.

Promontorium Agassiz is a mountainous cape situated on the northeast margin of Mare Imbrium on the near side of the Moon. Its selenographic coordinates are 42.4° N, 1.77° E. It is located south of Promontorium Deville and Mons Blanc, northeast of Mons Piton, and northwest of Cassini crater.

Promontorium Agassiz is named after Jean Louis Rodolphe Agassiz, a Swiss zoologist and geologist. The name of the feature was approved by the IAU in 1935.

== Promontorium Agassiz during full moon ==
The brightness of the slopes of Promontorium Agassiz, as seen during full moon, is also noticeable on the photographic version of chart LAC 25 (page 50) in The Clementine Atlas of the Moon.
