= Charles Piazzi Smyth =

British astronomer (1819–1900)

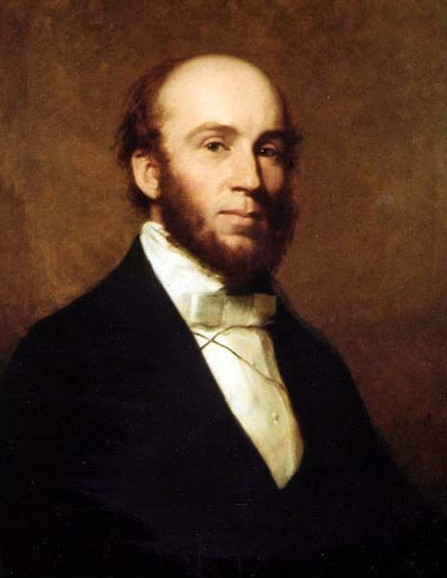
- Charles Piazzi Smyth
- Born: 3 January 1819; Naples, Kingdom of the Two Sicilies
- Died: 21 February 1900 (aged 81)
- Spouse: Jessica Duncan Piazzi Smyth (m. 1855; died 1896)
- Father: William Henry Smyth
- Scientific career
- Fields: Astronomy
- Workplaces: Astronomer Royal for Scotland

Charles Piazzi Smyth (3 January 1819 – 21 February 1900) was a British astronomer who was Astronomer Royal for Scotland from 1846 to 1888; he is known for many innovations in astronomy and, along with his wife Jessica Duncan Piazzi Smyth, his pyramidological and metrological studies of the Great Pyramid of Giza.

== Astronomical career ==
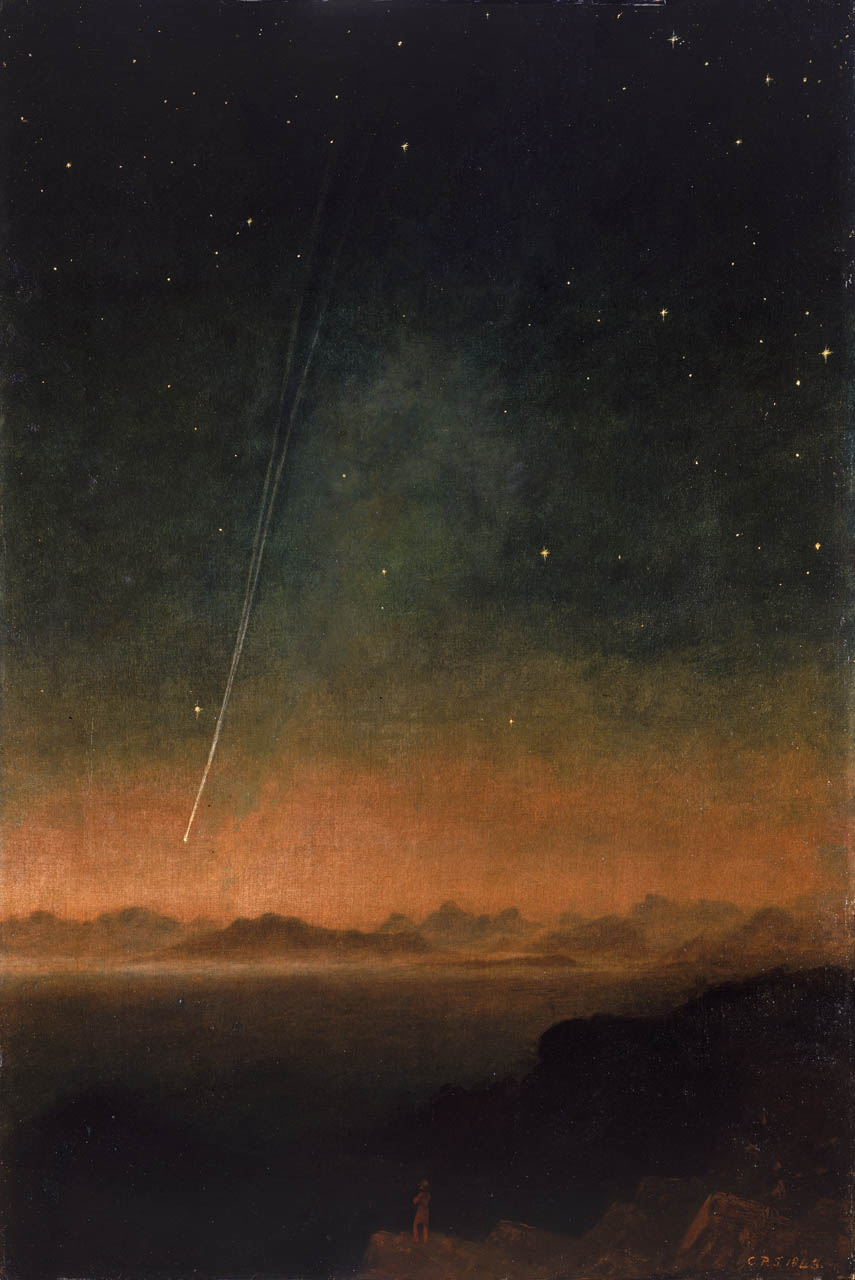
A night-time view showing an eyewitness account of the Great Comet of 1843, painted by astronomer Charles Piazzi Smyth

Charles Piazzi Smyth (pronounced /ˈsmaɪθ/) was born in Naples, Kingdom of the Two Sicilies, to Captain (later Admiral) William Henry Smyth and his wife the former Eliza Anne "Annarella" Warington. He was named Piazzi after his godfather, the Italian astronomer Giuseppe Piazzi, whose acquaintance his father had made at Palermo when serving in the Mediterranean. His father subsequently settled at Bedford and equipped there an observatory, that he used to compile possibly the first book on astronomy, "The Bedford Catalogue from Cycles of Celestial Objects" (still in print 165 years later). It was in this observatory that his son Piazzi received his first lessons in astronomy. He was educated at Bedford School until the age of sixteen when he became an assistant to Sir Thomas Maclear at the Cape of Good Hope, where he observed Halley's Comet and the Great Comet of 1843, and took an active part in the verification and extension of Nicolas Louis de Lacaille's arc of the meridian.

In 1846 he was appointed Astronomer Royal for Scotland, based at the Calton Hill Observatory in Edinburgh, and professor of astronomy in the University of Edinburgh. Shortly after his appointment, the observatory was placed under the control of Her Majesty's Treasury and suffered from a long series of under-funding. Because of this, most of his notable work in astronomy was done elsewhere. Here he completed the reduction, and continued the series, of the observations made by his predecessor, Thomas James Henderson. In 1853, Smyth was responsible for installing the time ball on top of Nelson's Monument in Edinburgh to give a time signal to the ships at Edinburgh's port of Leith. By 1861, this visual signal was augmented by the One O'Clock Gun at Edinburgh Castle.

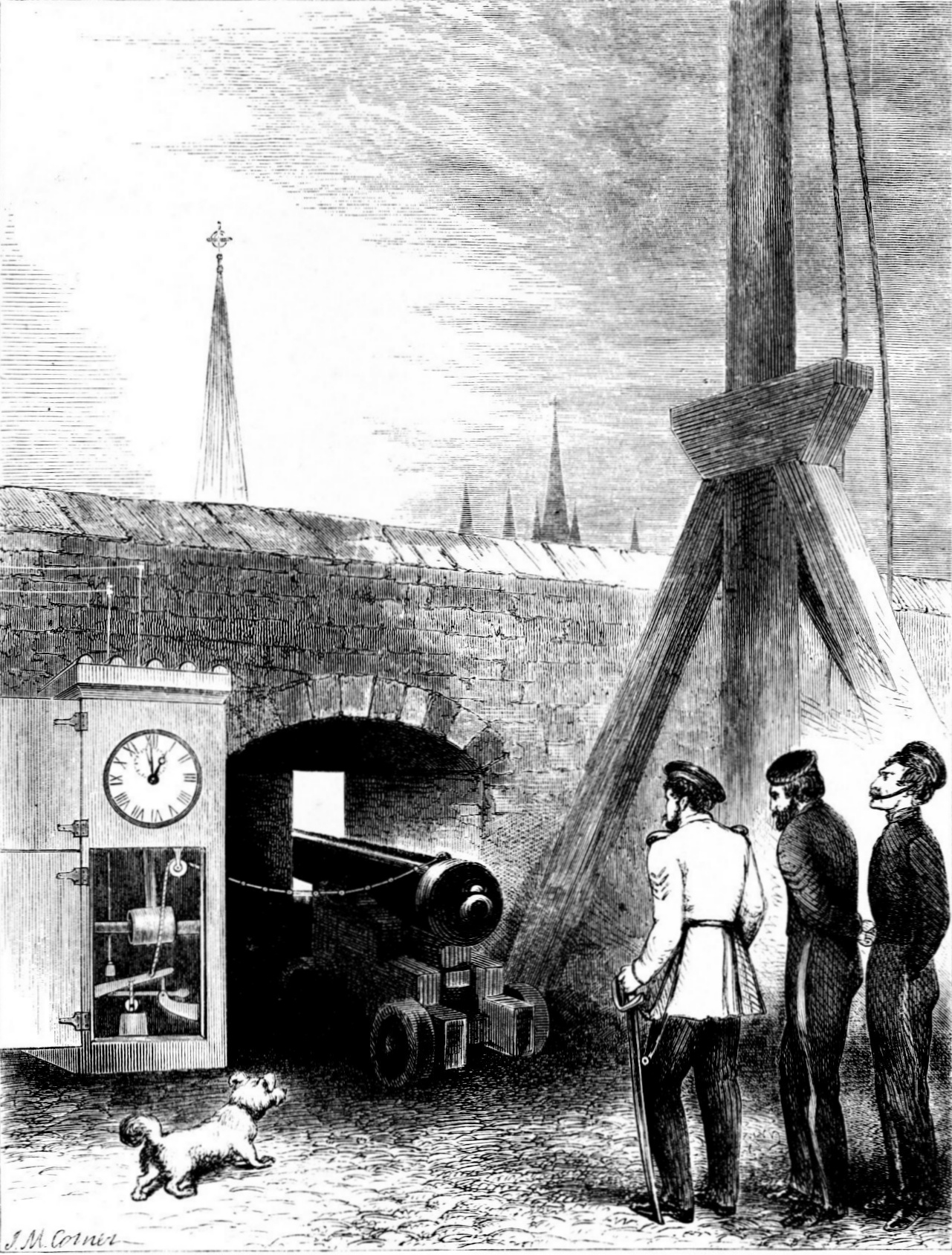
Firing the One o'clock gun in 1861

In 1704 Isaac Newton wrote in his book Opticks Book 1, Part 1: "... [telescopes] ... cannot be so formed as to take away that confusion of the Rays which arises from the Tremors of the Atmosphere. The only Remedy is a most serene and quiet Air, such as may perhaps be found on the tops of the highest Mountains above the grosser Clouds." This suggestion fell on deaf ears until in 1856, Smyth petitioned the Admiralty for a grant of £500 to take a telescope to the slopes of the Teide volcano in Tenerife (which he spelt Teneriffe) and test whether Newton had been right or not. In South Africa he had spent many nights observing from mountain tops but when he moved to Edinburgh had been appalled by the poor observing conditions there.

The Admiralty approved his grant and he was offered the loan of further equipment from many sources. Robert Stephenson loaned his 140-ton yacht Titania for the expedition. Mr. Hugh Pattinson loaned his refracting telescope of 7.5 inches (19 cm). This was a Thomas Cooke equatorial with setting circles and a driving clock. The Crimean War had recently concluded and the army offered to lend tents. This offer was declined as Piazzi Smyth had already designed a tent with a sewn-in groundsheet based on his experience in South Africa.

On this and all his subsequent trips he was accompanied by his wife whom he had married the year before. In 1856, on reaching Tenerife they first set up camp on Mount Guajara, a 8,900 ft (2,700 m) peak about 4 miles (6.4 km) south of Teide (all heights on Tenerife are those he derived barometrically). It was higher than all its neighbours and free from any volcanic activity. They took all their equipment up loaded on mules, except for the Pattinson telescope which was much too bulky. They stayed there a month making astronomical, meteorological and geological observations. He made observations of the steadiness and clarity of star images with the 3.6-inch (9 cm) Sheepshanks telescope and found both much better than at Edinburgh. He also made the first positive detection of heat coming from the Moon. However, they were annoyed by frequent dust incursions which frequently blotted out the horizon. Even when the dust was at its worst, the transparency at the zenith was better than at Edinburgh.

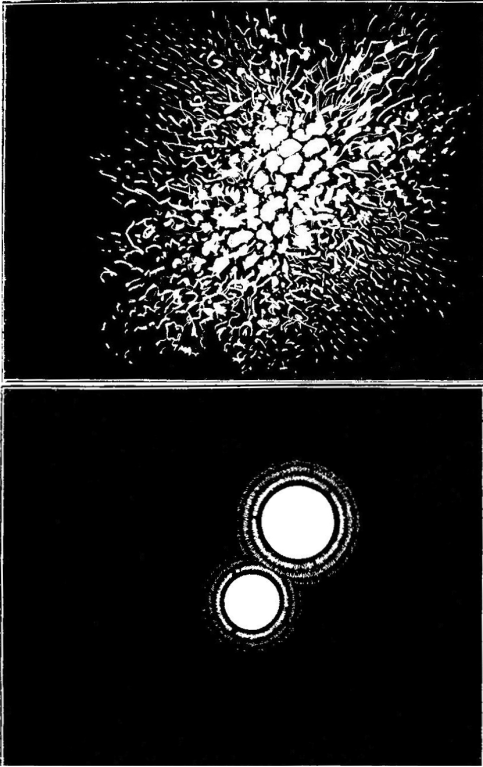
α Piscium as seen from Edinburgh (above) and from Alta Vista at 10,700 ft (3,300 m) (below). The separation is 3.5″ and the diameter of the Airy disc 1.5″

The dust was evidently confined to individual layers, so he decided to move to Alta Vista at 10,700 ft (3,300 m), on the eastern slope of Teide, the highest point that mules could reach. He was determined to use the larger Pattinson telescope and returned to La Orotava to fetch it. As the three boxes were too heavy, they were opened and the contents distributed among several smaller boxes which were loaded on to seven strong horses. The telescope was soon mounted and in action. The Airy Disc was clearly seen and he made many critical observations and fine drawings. They spent a month there during which they spent a day climbing to the summit of Teide at 12,200 ft (3,700 m).

The scientific results were described in reports addressed to the Lord Commissioners of the Admiralty, the Royal Society, and the "Astronomical Observations made at the Royal Observatory, Edinburgh Vol XII 1863", which were widely acclaimed. Piazzi Smyth was the pioneer of the modern practice of placing telescopes at high altitudes to enjoy the best observing conditions.

He wrote a popular account of the voyage in "Teneriffe, an astronomers Experiment". This was the first book ever illustrated by stereoscopic photographs ("photo-stereographs"). It included 20 stereoviews of Teneriffe taken by the author using the wet collodion process. A stereoscope could be purchased which allowed the pictures to be viewed in 3-D without removing them from the book.

In 1871 and 1872 Smyth investigated the spectra of the aurora, and zodiacal light. He recommended the use of the rain-band for weather forecasting and discovered, in conjunction with Alexander Stewart Herschel, the harmonic relation between the rays emitted by carbon monoxide. In 1877–1878 he constructed at Lisbon a map of the solar spectrum for which he received the Makdougall Brisbane Prize in 1880. Smyth carried out further spectroscopic researches at Madeira in 1880 and at Winchester in 1884.

In 1888 Smyth resigned as Astronomer Royal in protest at the chronic under-funding and age of his equipment. This brought events to a head and the Royal Observatory was almost closed when James Lindsay, Earl of Crawford made a donation of new astronomical instruments and the complete Bibliotheca Lindesiana in order that a new observatory could be founded. Thanks to this donation, the new Royal Observatory on Blackford Hill was opened in 1896. After his resignation, Smyth retired to the neighborhood of Ripon, where he remained until his death.

== Pyramidological research ==
Smyth corresponded with pyramid theorist John Taylor and was heavily influenced by him. Taylor theorized in his 1859 book The Great Pyramid: Why Was It Built? & Who Built It? that the Great Pyramid was planned and the building supervised by the biblical Noah. Refused a grant by the Royal Society, Smyth went on an expedition to Egypt in order to accurately measure every surface, dimension, and aspect of the Great Pyramid. He brought along equipment to measure the dimensions of the stones, the precise angle of sections such as the descending passage, and a specially designed camera to photograph both the interior and exterior of the pyramid. He also used other instruments to make astronomical calculations and determine the pyramid's accurate latitude and longitude.

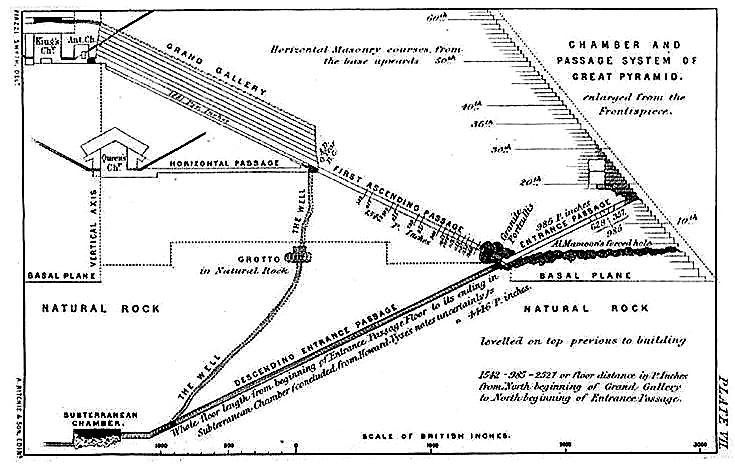
This diagram from Smyth's Our Inheritance in the Great Pyramid (1877) shows some of his measurements and chronological determinations made from them

Smyth subsequently published his book Our Inheritance in the Great Pyramid in 1864 (which he expanded over the years and is also titled The Great Pyramid: Its Secrets and Mysteries Revealed). Smyth claimed that the measurements he obtained from the Great Pyramid of Giza indicated a unit of length, the pyramid inch, equivalent to 1.001 British inches, that could have been the standard of measurement by the pyramid's architects. From this he extrapolated a number of other measurements, including the pyramid pint, the sacred cubit, and the pyramid scale of temperature.

Smyth claimed that the pyramid inch was a God-given measure handed down through the centuries from the time of Shem (Noah's Son), and that the architects of the pyramid could only have been directed by the hand of God. To support this Smyth said that, in measuring the pyramid, he found the number of inches in the perimeter of the base equaled one hundred times the number of days in a year, and found a numeric relationship between the height of the pyramid in inches to the distance from Earth to the Sun, measured in statute miles. He also advanced the theory that the Great Pyramid was a repository of prophecies which could be revealed by detailed measurements of the structure. Working upon theories by Taylor, he conjectured that the Hyksos were the Hebrew people, and that they built the Great Pyramid under the leadership of Melchizedek. Because the pyramid inch was a divine unit of measurement, Smyth, a committed proponent of British Israelism, used his conclusions as an argument against the introduction of the metric system in Britain. For much of his life he was a vocal opponent of the metric system, which he considered a product of the minds of atheistic French radicals, a position advocated in many of his works.

Smyth, despite his bad reputation in Egyptological circles today, performed much valuable work at Giza. He made the most accurate measurements of the Great Pyramid that any explorer had made up to that time, and he photographed the interior passages, using a magnesium light, for the first time. Smyth's work resulted in many drawings and calculations, which were soon incorporated into his books Our Inheritance in the Great Pyramid, the three-volume Life and Work at the Great Pyramid (1867), and On the Antiquity of Intellectual Man (1868). For his works he was awarded the Keith gold medal for 1865–1867 by the Royal Society of Edinburgh, but in 1874, the Royal Society of London rejected his paper on the design of Khufu's pyramid, as they had Taylor's. The rejection of his ideas helped contribute to his resignation from his post as Royal Astronomer in 1888.

Smyth claimed to have calculated that "there is more land-surface in the Great Pyramid's general parallel of 30°, than in any other" and that "on carefully summing up all the dry land habitable by man the wide world over, the centre of the whole falls within the Great Pyramid's special territory of Lower Egypt."

== Influence of Smyth's pyramid theories ==
Smyth's theories on pyramid prophecy were then integrated into the works and prophecies of Charles Taze Russell (such as his Studies in the Scriptures), who founded the Bible Student movement (who adopted the name Jehovah's Witnesses in 1931, though Russell's successor, Joseph F. Rutherford, denounced pyramidology as unscriptural). Smyth's proposed dates for the Second Coming, first 1882 then many dates between 1892 and 1911, were failed predictions.

The theories of Taylor and Smyth gained many eminent supporters and detractors in the field of Egyptology during the late 1800s, but by the end of the 19th century it had lost most of its mainstream scientific support. The greatest blow to the theory was dealt by the great Egyptogist William Matthew Flinders Petrie, who had initially been a supporter. When Petrie went to Egypt in 1880 to perform new measurements, he found that the pyramid was several feet smaller than previously believed. This so undermined the theory that Petrie rejected it, writing:

The theories of the widths and heights of the passages are all connected, as the passages are all of the same section, or multiples of that. The entrance passage height has had a curiously complex theory attached to it supposing that the vertical and perpendicular heights are added together, their sum is 100 so-called "Pyramid inches". This at the angle of 26º 31' would require a perpendicular height of 47.27, the actual height being 47.24 ± .02. But in considering any theory of the height of this passage, it can not be separated from the similar passages, or from the most accurately wrought of all such heights, the course height of the King's Chamber. The passages vary from 46.2 to 48.6, and the mean course height is 47.040 ± .013. So although this theory agrees with one of the passages, it is evidently not the origin of this frequently recurring height; and it is the more unlikely as there is no authentic example, that will bear examination, of the use or existence of any such measure as a "Pyramid inch," or of a cubit of 25.025 British inches.

== Marriage, family, and death ==
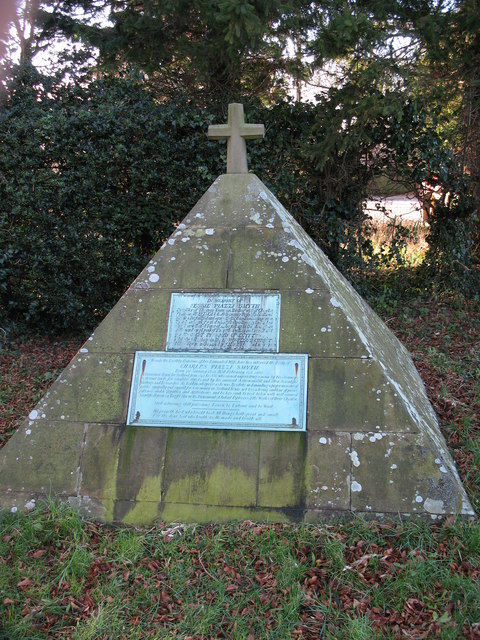
A pyramid surmounted by a cross, Smyth's tomb in Sharow churchyard

In 1855 Smyth married Jessica "Jessie" Duncan (1812–1896), daughter of Thomas Duncan. Jessie Duncan was a geologist who had studied with Alexander Rose in Edinburgh, and travelled on geological expeditions to Ireland, France, Switzerland and Italy.

Smyth's brothers were Warington Wilkinson Smyth and Henry Augustus Smyth. His sisters were Henrietta Grace Smyth, who married Reverend Baden Powell and was mother of Robert Baden-Powell, 1st Baron Baden-Powell (founder of the world Scouting Movement), Georgiana Rosetta Smyth, who married William Henry Flower; and Ellen Philadelphia Smyth, who married Captain Henry Toynbee of the HEIC.

Smyth died in 1900 and was buried at St. John's Church in the village of Sharow near Ripon. A small stone pyramid-shaped monument, topped by a Christian cross, marks his gravesite.

== Honours ==
He was elected a Fellow of the Royal Society of Edinburgh in 1846, and served on its council for a number of years. In June 1857 he was elected a Fellow of the Royal Society, but resigned in 1874. He was conferred with Honorary Membership of the Institution of Engineers and Shipbuilders in Scotland in 1859. The crater Piazzi Smyth on the Moon is named after him.

== Works ==
- Smyth, Charles Piazzi (1855). Description of New or Improved Instruments for Navigation and Astronomy. Edinburgh: Neill & Co., Printers.
- Smyth, Charles Piazzi (1858). Teneriffe, An Astronomer's Experiment: or, Specialities of a Residence Above the Clouds. London: L. Reeve. Full text available from Google Books
- Smyth, Charles Piazzi (1862). Three Cities in Russia. London: L. Reeve.
- Smyth, Charles Piazzi (1864). The Our Inheritance in the Great Pyramid. London: A. Strahan. Reprinted in many editions by many publishers, often entitled The Great Pyramid: Its Secrets and Mysteries Revealed. Full text available on the Internet Archive
- Smyth, Charles Piazzi (1867). Life and Work at the Great Pyramid During the Months of January, February, March, and April, A.D. 1865; With a Discussion of the Facts Ascertained. Edinburgh: Edmonston and Douglas. Full text available from Google Books
- Smyth, Charles Piazzi (1868). On the Antiquity of Intellectual Man: From a Practical and Astronomical Point of View. Edinburgh: Edmonston and Douglas. Full text available from Google Books
- Smyth, Charles Piazzi (1874). Our inheritance in the Great Pyramid: including all the most important discoveries up to the present time. London: Isbister. Subtitled "New and Expanded Edition".
- Smyth, Charles Piazzi (1882). Madeira Spectroscopic: Being a Revision of 21 Places in the Red Half of the Solar Visible Spectrum with a Rutherfurd Diffraction Grating, at Madeira ... During the Summer of 1881. Edinburgh: W. & A. K. Johnston.
- Smyth, Charles Piazzi (1884). New Measures of the Great Pyramid. London: R. Banks.
