= Aristillus (crater) =

Lunar impact crater

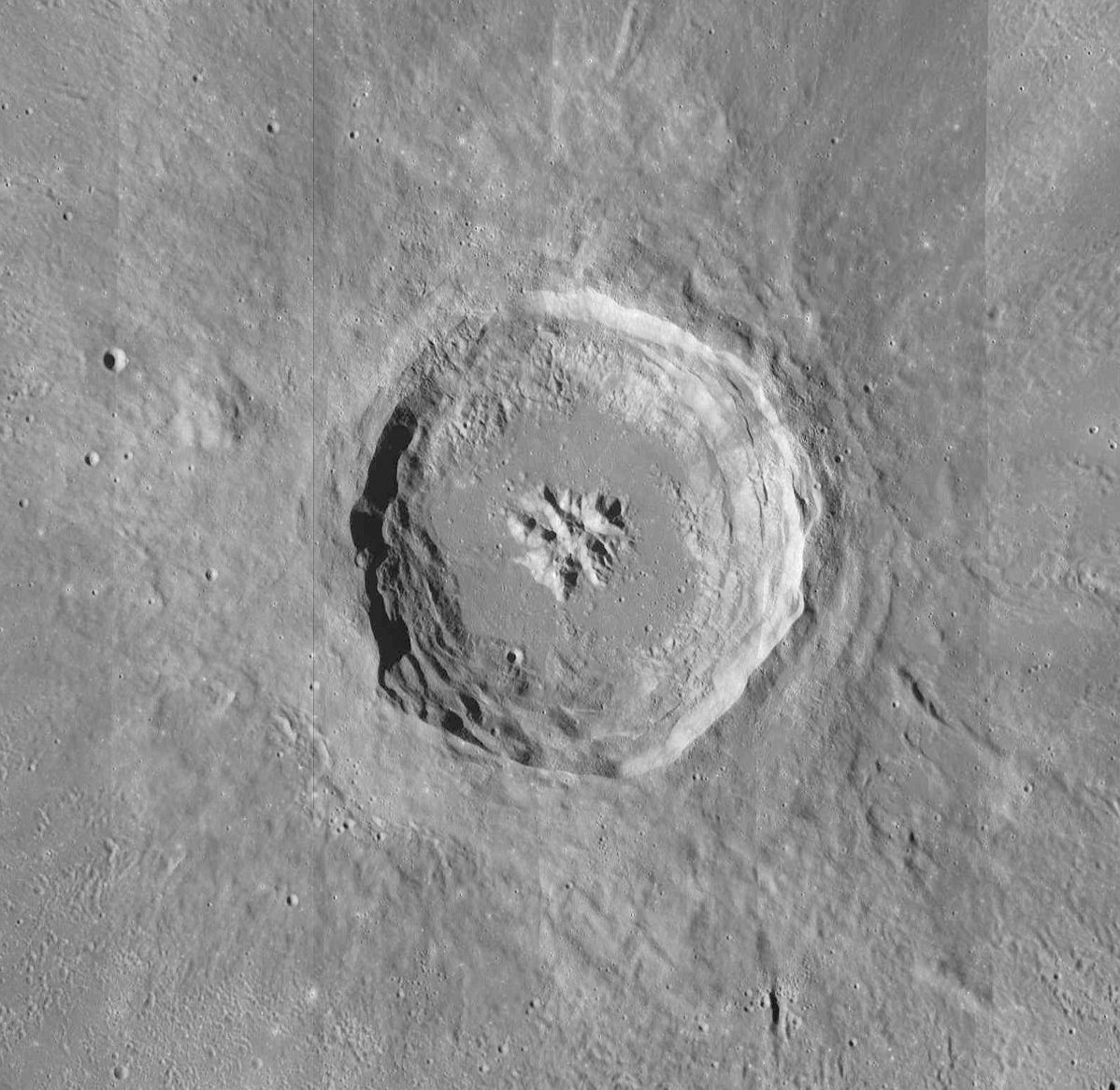
- LRO mosaic
- Coordinates: 33.9°N 1.2°E
- Diameter: 54.37 km (33.78 mi)
- Depth: 3.30 km (2.05 mi)
- Colongitude: 359° at sunrise
- Formation: Copernican ?
- Eponym: Aristyllus

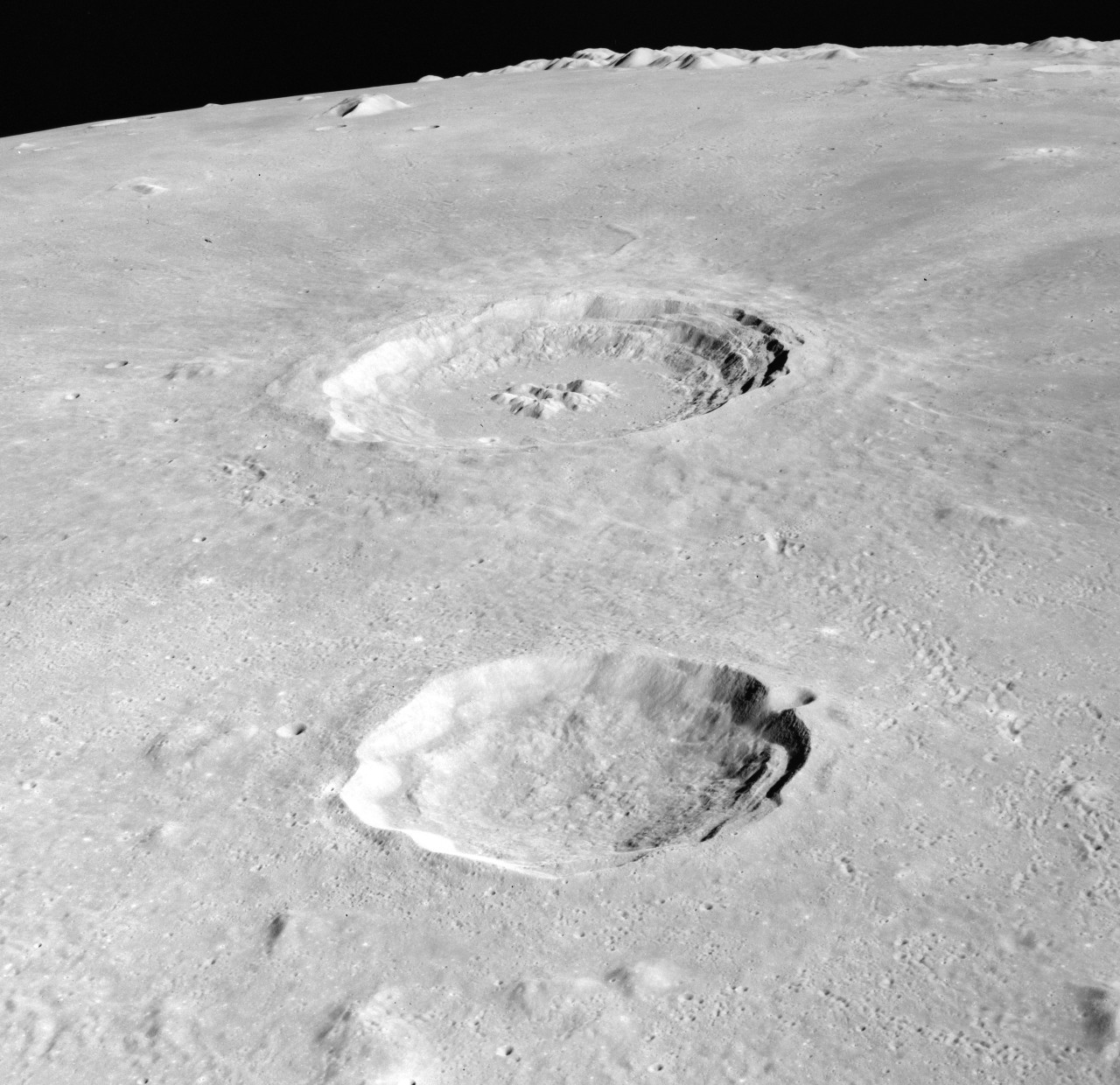
Autolycus (bottom) and Aristillus (top) from Apollo 15. NASA photo.

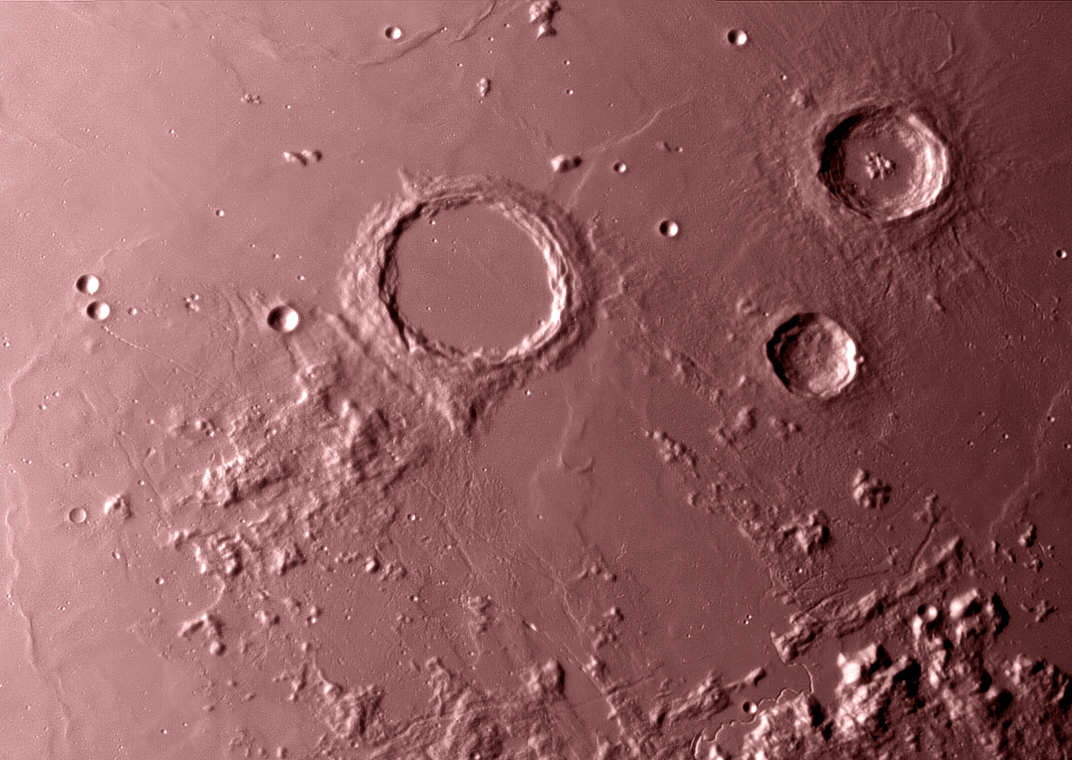
Aristillus is the crater in the upper right corner of this infrared image

Aristillus is a prominent lunar impact crater that lies in the eastern Mare Imbrium. T. W. Webb described it as "a very magnificent crater" and "the ring stands up nobly from the plain, and is flanked on all sides ... by radiating banks". Patrick Moore noted that the "interior details show optical variations over a lunation." Directly to the south is the smaller crater Autolycus, while to the southwest is the large Archimedes. To the northeast are the craters Theaetetus and Cassini.

This crater was named after the Greek astronomer Aristyllus (fl. c. 280 B.C.). Its designation was formally adopted by the International Astronomical Union in 1935. The name was introduced into lunar nomenclature by Italian astronomer Giovanni Ricciolli in 1651.

== Description ==
The Apollo 15 landing site is located around 250 km (160 mi) to the south of Aristillus. Ejecta samples collected from that site suggest a tentative age of 1.3 Gyr for this crater. Measurements with the Gamma-Ray Spectrometer on the Lunar Prospector spacecraft indicate an anomalously high abundance of thorium nearby.

The rim of Aristillus has a wide, irregular outer rampart of ejecta that is relatively easy to discern against the smooth surface of the surrounding mare. The crater impact created a ray system that extends for a distance of over 600 kilometers. These intersect with the less pronounced rays from Autolycus. Due to its rays, Aristillus is mapped as part of the Copernican System, although it may be older. The rim is generally circular in form, but possesses a slight hexagonal shape.

The inner walls of the rim have a terraced surface, and descend to a relatively rough interior that has not been flooded with lava. In the middle of the crater is a set of three clustered peaks, which rise to a height of about 0.9 km. American planetary scientist C. A. Wood observed that the "peaks look like they stick nearly straight up in a tight circle, with one fallen slab across the middle." The spectra of the central peak fits an olivine-bearing gabbroic norite mineralogy, which originated from a depth of 5.5 to 8.4 km.

In the northern outer ramparts of Aristillus is a ghost crater remnant. This is the protruding rim of an old crater that has been almost completely submerged by the lava flows of the surrounding Mare Imbrium. The southern end of the rim has been covered by the ejecta from Aristillus. Along the eastern inner wall and rim is an unusual narrow ribbon of dark material.

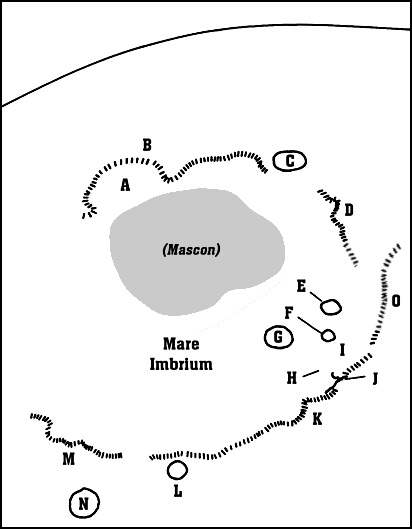
Detail map of Mare Imbrium's features. Aristillus is the feature marked "E".

In 1914, American astronomer W. H. Pickering observed what he called "canals" within the crater under certain lighting conditions. These cross the northwest rim.

== In culture ==
English progressive rock band Camel named the first song on their album Moonmadness after the crater. Science fiction author Travis J I Corcoran set much of his first novel, The Powers of the Earth, on and under Aristillus.

== Satellite craters ==
By convention these features are identified on lunar maps by placing the letter on the side of the crater midpoint that is closest to Aristillus.

Aristillus	Latitude	Longitude	Diameter
A	33.6° N	4.5° E	5 km
B	34.8° N	1.9° W	8 km
