= Piazzi Smyth (crater) =

Lunar crater

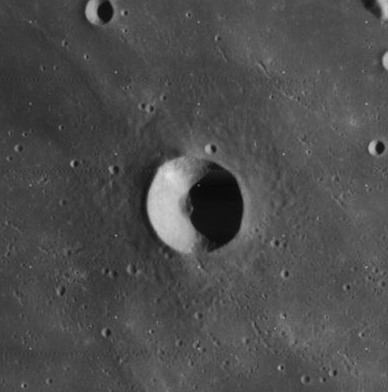
- Lunar Orbiter 4 image
- Coordinates: 41.9°N 3.2°W
- Diameter: 13 km
- Depth: 2.5 km
- Colongitude: 3° at sunrise
- Formation: Eratosthenian
- Eponym: Charles Piazzi Smyth

Piazzi Smyth is a small lunar impact crater in the eastern part of the Mare Imbrium. It was named after Scottish astronomer Charles Piazzi Smyth. This is an isolated feature located about 100 kilometers to the southwest of the Montes Alpes mountain range. To the southeast of this crater is Mons Piton, an isolated mountain that rises to a height of 2.3 km and occupies a diameter of about 25 km.

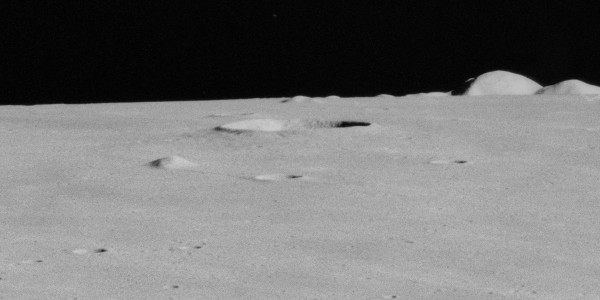
Oblique view from Apollo 15

This crater is a nicely circular feature with a rim and interior that have not been significantly modified by impacts. The inner walls slope smoothly downwards to the small floor about the midpoint, which occupies a diameter of only one-fifth the total diameter of the crater. This formation has no other notable features, and its albedo matches the surrounding lava plain.

== Satellite craters ==
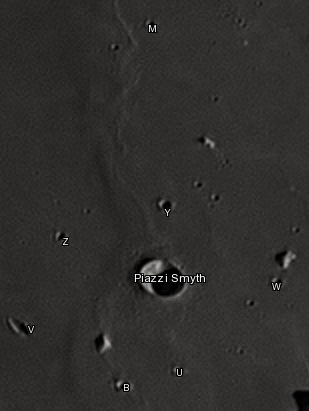
Piazzi Smyth crater taken from Earth in 2012 at the University of Hertfordshire's Bayfordbury Observatory with the telescopes Meade LX200 14" and Lumenera Skynyx 2-1

By convention these features are identified on lunar maps by placing the letter on the side of the crater midpoint that is closest to Piazzi Smyth.

Piazzi Smyth	Latitude	Longitude	Diameter
B	40.5° N	3.4° W	4 km
M	45.0° N	4.2° W	2 km
U	40.8° N	2.7° W	3 km
V	40.9° N	4.7° W	7 km
W	42.2° N	1.9° W	3 km
Y	42.8° N	3.4° W	4 km
Z	42.1° N	4.6° W	3 km

== See also ==
- Asteroid 9714 Piazzismyth
