= Chuck Wood =

Chuck Wood may refer to:

- Charles A. Wood, planetary geologist
  - 363115 Chuckwood, an asteroid named in honor of Charles A. Wood
- Chuck Woods, American boxer
- Chuck Wood, a puppet character operated by ventriloquist David Strassman
