= The Powers of the Earth =

2017 science fiction book by Travis J I Corcoran

- First edition
- Author: Travis J I Corcoran
- Language: English
- Genre: Fiction
- Publisher: Morlock Publishing
- Publication date: 2017
- Publication place: United States
- Pages: 610 pp.
- ISBN: 978-1973311140
- Followed by: Causes of Separation

The Powers of the Earth is a 2017 libertarian hard science fiction novel by Travis J I Corcoran. It is his debut novel, and the first release in the Aristillus Series. The novel was funded by a 2017 Kickstarter campaign that raised $18,000.

== Plot ==
An ungoverned lunar settlement whose economy developed while Earth's economy declined under a command-and-control economy engages in a struggle to stay free from Earth's meddling bureaucracy. The lunar colonists engage in military conflicts with the Earth forces on the surface of the Moon, in space ships flying between Earth and the Moon, and in the tunnels of the city of Aristillus. The novel deals with uplifted dogs, artificial intelligence, guns, space law, anti-gravity, libertarianism, and rebellion, as well as the Robert Heinlein trope of the competent man.

== Reviews and critical reception ==
The novel won the Prometheus Award for Best Novel in 2018.
