= Vallis Alpes =

Lunar valley

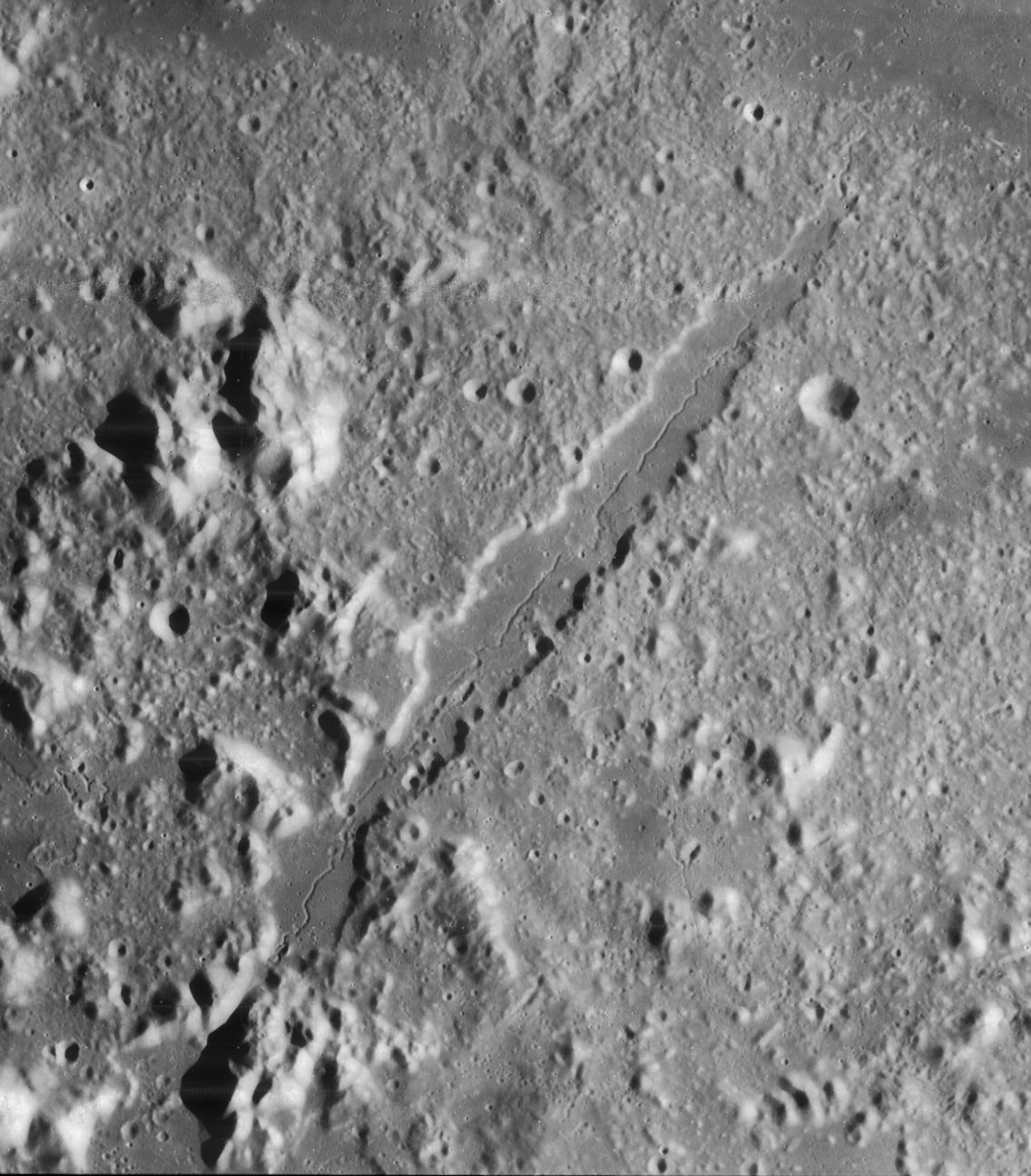
Lunar Orbiter 4 image of Vallis Alpes

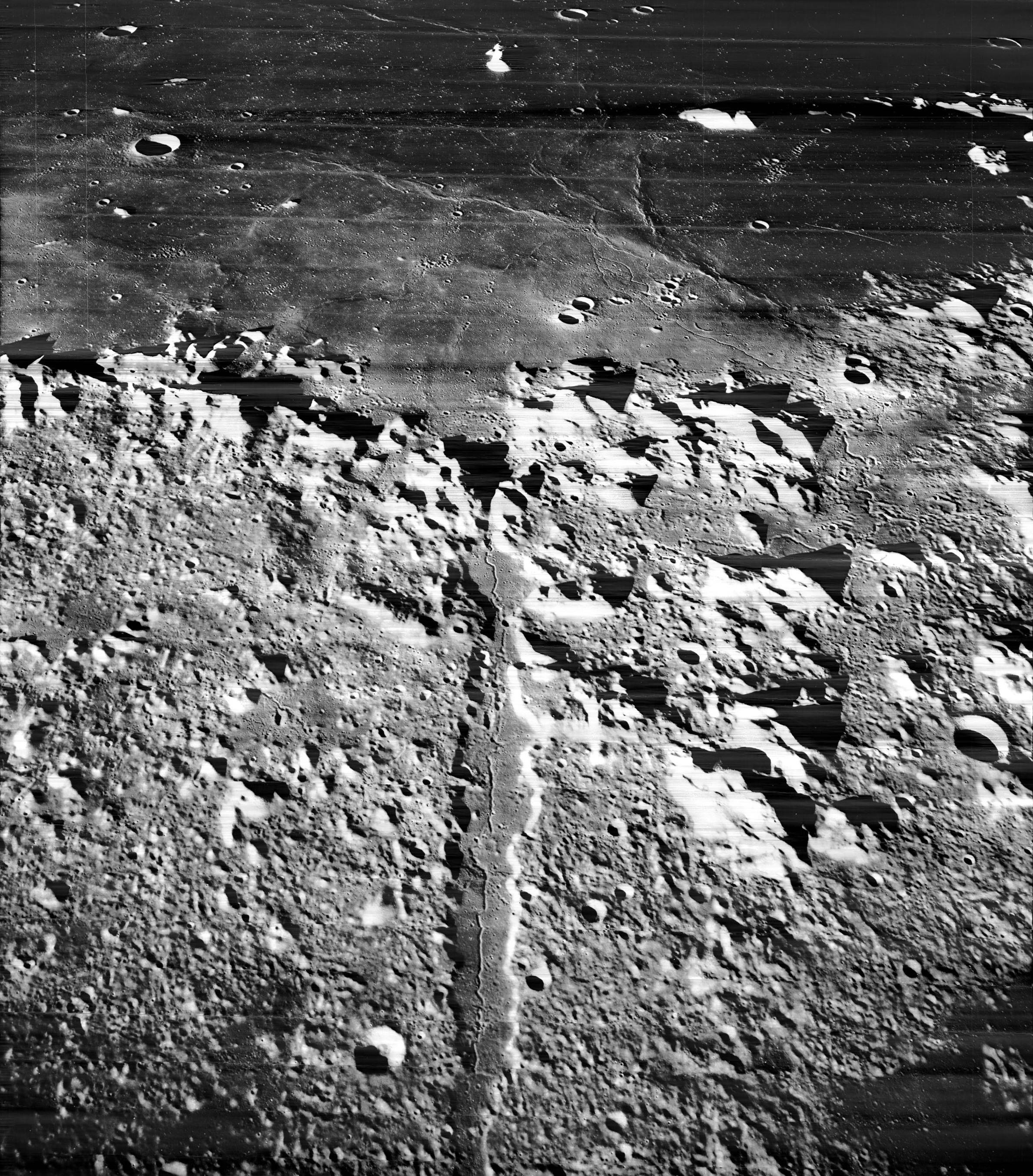
Oblique view of Vallis Alpes from Lunar Orbiter 5. Mare Imbrium is in the background.

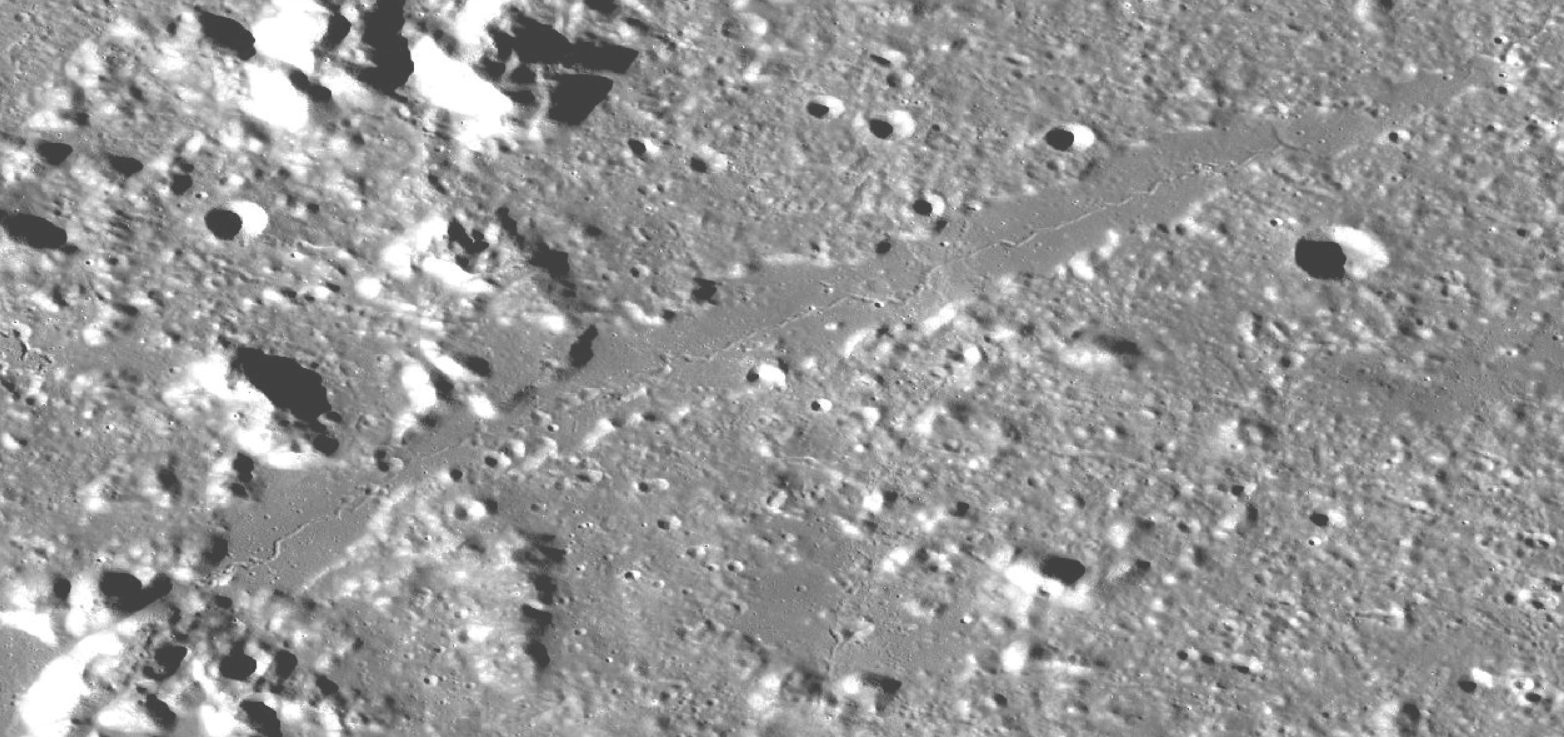
Closeup of Vallis Alpes from Lunar Reconnaissance Orbiter data. The center rille is clearly visible.

Vallis Alpes (Latin for "Alpine Valley") is a lunar valley feature that bisects the Montes Alpes range. It extends 166 km from the Mare Imbrium basin, trending east-northeast to the edge of the Mare Frigoris. The valley is narrow at both ends and widens to a maximum width of about 10 km along the middle stretch. The selenographic coordinates of the center of this feature are 49.21°N 3.63°E. This valley was discovered in 1727 by Francesco Bianchini. Its name was confirmed by the International Astronomical Union in 1961.

== Description ==
The valley floor is a flat, lava-flooded surface that is bisected by a slender, broken, cleft-like rille. The center rille is a challenging target for telescope observation from the Earth. The rille itself is longer than the valley proper, at 196.65 km ± 10.98 km, and has a width of 0.58 km ± 0.09 km and depth of 77.69 m ± 28.07 m.

The sides of the valley rise from the floor to the surrounding highland terrain, a blocky, irregular surface. The southern face of the valley is straighter than the northern side, which is slightly bowed and uneven. The more rugged edges of the valley lie at the narrow west-southwest end that cuts through the mountain range.

== Geology ==
Most likely this valley is a graben that was subsequently flooded with magma from Mare Imbrium and Mare Frigoris. However, the valley could have been formed by stress fractures due to expansion of the mantle or contraction after solidification of regolith. It is not dissimilar to other linear features radiating from Mare Imbrium, and the impact event which created the Imbrium basin may have also led to the stresses creating Vallis Alpes. Lava flooding and thermal or tensional stress fractures are two causes of graben formation.
