= Mons Piton =

Mountain on the Moon

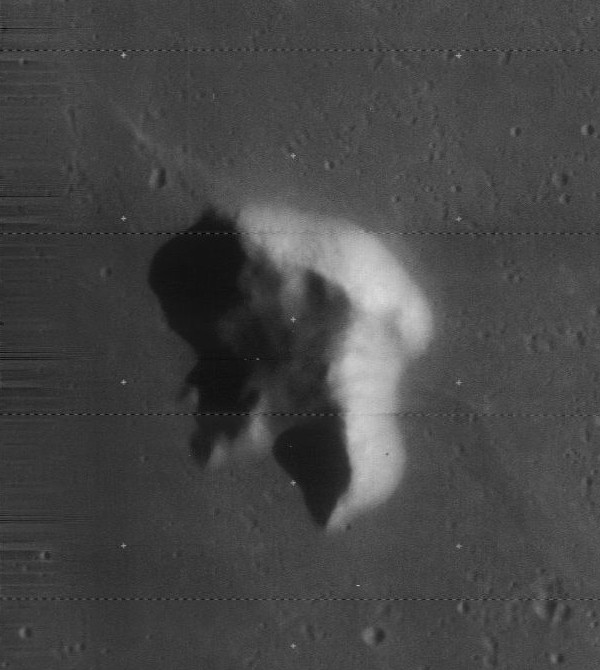
- Lunar Orbiter 4 image

Highest point
- Elevation: 2.3 km (1.4 mi)
- Listing: Lunar mountains
- Coordinates: 40.6°N 1.1°W

Dimensions
- Width: 25 km (16 mi)

Geography
- Location: the Moon

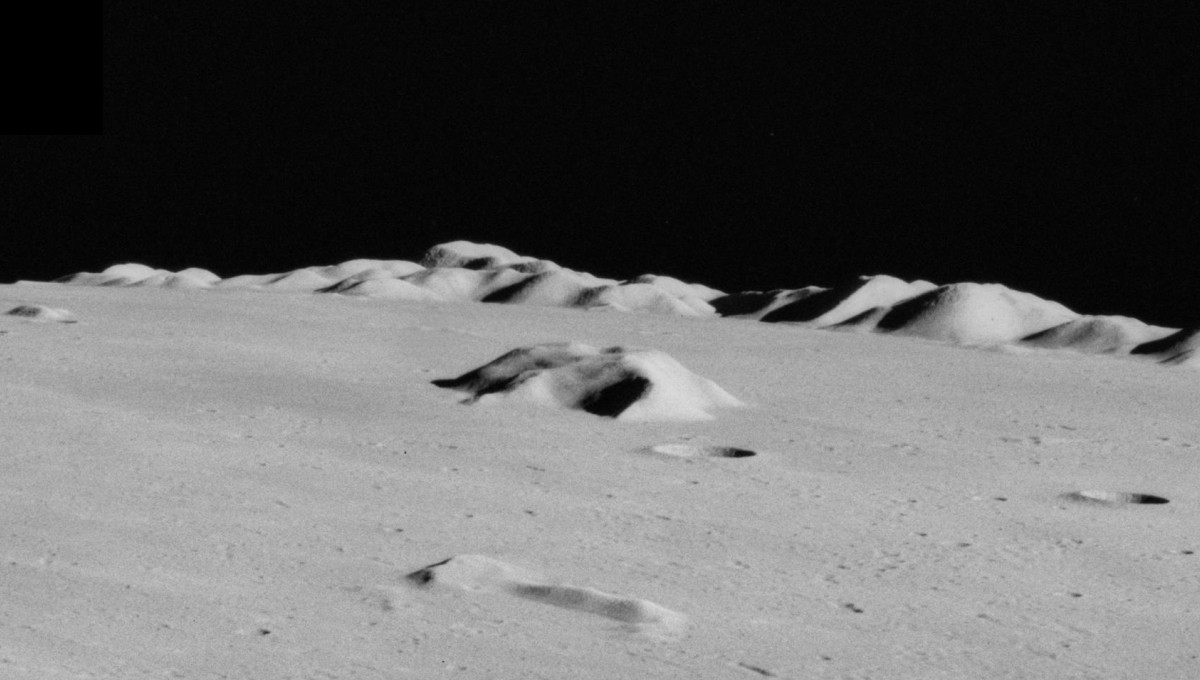
Oblique view from Apollo 15, facing north, and centered on Mons Piton. The craters Piton A and Piton B are visible near center and to the right, and Piton Gamma (γ) is in the foreground.

Mons Piton is an isolated lunar mountain that is located in the eastern part of the Mare Imbrium, to the north-northwest of the crater Aristillus. Due east of Mons Piton is the flooded crater Cassini, and to the west-northwest lies Piazzi Smyth. North and northeast of this massif is the Montes Alpes range, forming the northeast edge of the lunar mare.

The selenographic coordinates of this rise are 40.6° N, 1.1° W, and it has a diameter of 25 km. It is slightly elongated along toward the northwest, with ridge lines to the south, northwest, and west. The peak climbs to a height of 2250 m, typical of the peaks in the Montes Alpes, but much lower than Mons Blanc, which rises to 3.6 km. Because it is an isolated formation on the lunar mare, this peak can form prominent shadows when illuminated by oblique sunlight during the lunar dawn or dusk. It is also known as a location of Transient Lunar Anomalies.

The peak of Piton is cratered from a meteor strike, though the crater can be difficult to observe from earthbound telescopes.

There is a pair of satellite craters on the mare to the south that are named for this peak (see below). To the south-southwest is a low ridge feature in an isolated portion of the mare that is designated Piton Gamma (γ).

Mons Piton was named for a peak on Tenerife Island. The lunar Mons Piton is located in a range known as the Montes Teneriffe.

== Mons Piton during full moon ==
The albedo values for the different parts of Mons Piton are not all the same. The north-northeastern and east-southeastern slopes of this rise are much brighter than the rest of it, which make Mons Piton look like a distinct white 'L' or steel square against the dark background of Mare Imbrium, especially during full moon. The brightness of Mons Piton is also noticeable on the photographic version of chart LAC 25 (page 50) in The Clementine Atlas of the Moon (Bussey / Spudis).

British lunar observer Harold Hill made a sequence of drawings of the changing appearances of Mons Piton throughout the lunar day, from sunrise to sunset. These drawings are included in his book A Portfolio of Lunar Drawings, 1991, page 64.

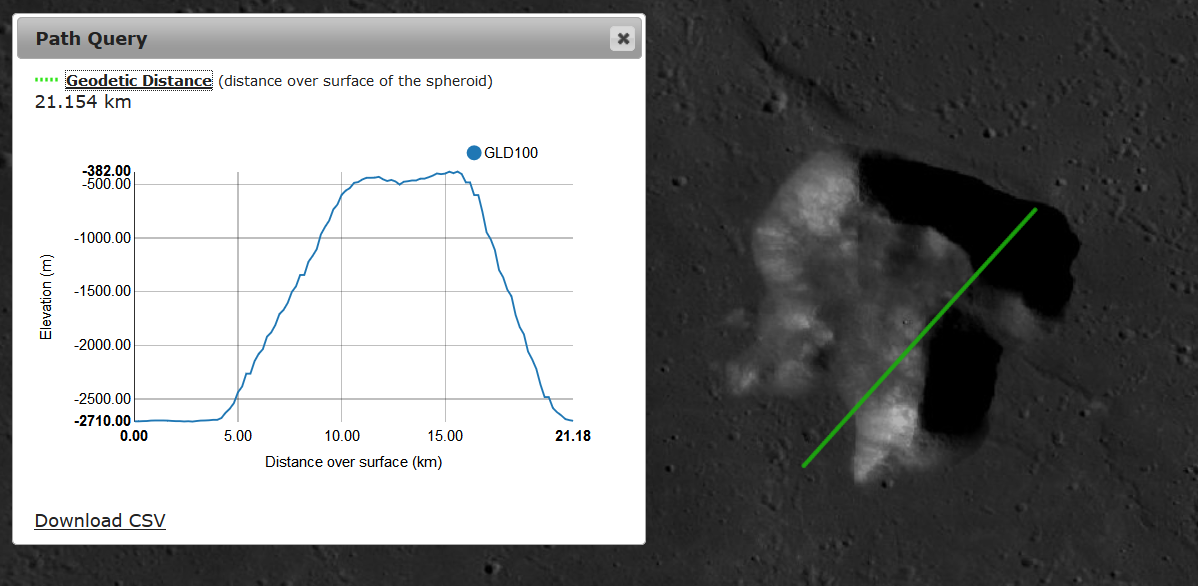
Mons Piton, from Lunar Reconnaissance Orbiter data, with elevation line across the peak (elevation from line left to right.)

== Satellite craters ==
By convention these features are identified on lunar maps by placing the letter on the side of the crater midpoint that is closest to Mons Piton. Both Piton A and B are to the south of Mons Piton.

Piton	Latitude	Longitude	Diameter
A	39.8° N	1.0° W	6 km
B	39.3° N	0.1° W	5 km

== See also ==
- List of mountains on the Moon
