= Travis Corcoran =

American author and politician

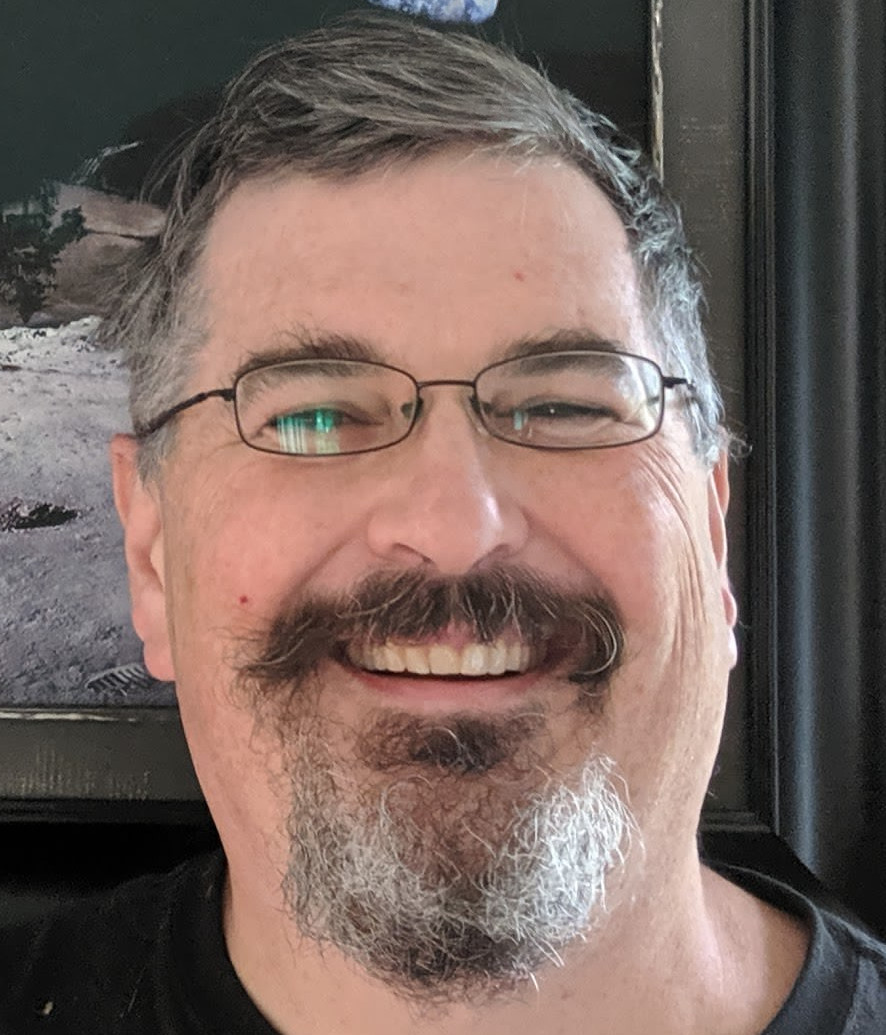

Member of the New Hampshire House of Representatives from the Hillsborough 28th district
- Incumbent
- Assumed office December 7, 2022

Personal details
- Born: 1970 or 1971 (age 54–55)
- Party: Republican

Travis Corcoran is an American politician and author. He is a Republican member for the Hillsborough 28th district of the New Hampshire House of Representatives, having been elected in November 2024. In 2022, he had been elected to Hillsborough's 44th district. His controversial statements on social media have attracted media attention and investigations by state authorities.

== Biography ==
Corcoran earned a degree in computer science and history from Cornell University in 1993 and has worked professionally as a software engineer.

In 2003, Corcoran founded the online video rental service SmartFlix, specializing in instructional videos. In 2007, he founded the online comic book retailer HeavyInk. Both businesses closed in March 2016.

Corcoran has blogged and self-published science fiction novels under the name Morlock Publishing. His 2017 hard science fiction novel The Powers of the Earth won the 2018 Prometheus Award for "Best Novel", and his 2018 novel Causes of Separation won the 2019 award. Corcoran is also the author of Escape the City, a homesteading manual targeted towards city-dwellers desiring to move to the country.

== Election history ==
Corcoran was elected to the New Hampshire House of Representatives's District Hillsborough 44 on November 8, 2022. On November 5, 2024, Corcoran was elected to the New Hampshire House of Representatives's District Hillsborough 28, replacing Leah Cushman. His co-representative for the district is Keith Erf.

== Political views ==
Corcoran describes his political orientation as anarcho-capitalist. After declining to answer questions from WBUR about his involvement as the keynote speaker for the New Hampshire Libertarian Party's 2026 state convention following death threats it made against Andru Volinsky, he described WBUR as "a regime propaganda organ for the ghey-race-communist-elite that have ruined America".

== Controversial Statements ==
Corcoran has drawn harsh criticism for several public statements made on social media.

=== 2011 ===
In January 2011, Arlington, Massachusetts police suspended Corcoran’s firearms license and confiscated firearms and ammunition after a blog post he wrote following the 2011 Tucson shooting that injured U.S. Representative Gabrielle Giffords. The post included the phrase “1 down and 534 to go,” referring to members of the United States Congress. Police said the statement could be interpreted as a credible threat and opened an investigation into Corcoran’s suitability to retain a firearms license. Corcoran was not arrested and was not charged with a crime.

=== 2013 ===
In 2013, police searched Corcoran’s home after a Twitter account associated with him posted comments appearing to call for the shooting of government employees installing surveillance cameras. During the search, police seized firearms that were registered to Corcoran’s girlfriend and warned that the weapons had been improperly stored. Corcoran later sold his home and business and moved to New Hampshire following the incident.

=== 2023 ===
In 2023, Corcoran posted on Twitter encouraging people to publicly use the racial slur known as "the n-word" as a form of protest against what he described as restrictions on speech. In posts, he urged followers to "say or type the word" in public as a demonstration that others could not control their thoughts or behavior. Corcoran later said he disliked the word and did not intend to harm people but believed using it was necessary to push back against political opponents.

=== 2025 ===
In 2025, Corcoran responded to an invitation from a gun-violence awareness organization encouraging legislators to wear orange by writing that "violence isn't associated with the presence of guns, but with the presence of African Americans," stating that "Blacks commit violent crimes a 5-10x the rate of whites." He added that he would wear a black T-shirt to "help make people aware of the fact that crime is predominantly caused by African Americans, and not by guns."

=== 2026 ===
In March 2026, Corcoran drew criticism after posting on social media that “we need a final solution for theater kids in politics” in response to an email invitation from Democratic state representative Jessica Grill, who is Jewish, to a bipartisan karaoke event for legislators. The phrase “final solution” is historically associated with Nazi Germany’s plan to exterminate Jews during the Holocaust, and the comment was widely condemned by lawmakers and community members. New Hampshire House Speaker Sherman Packard and Democratic leaders rebuked his comments.

Also in March 2026, Corcoran asked White House staffer Stephen Miller to deport state representative Luz Bay, who is a naturalized citizen from the Philippines.

These two controversies led to an administrative legislative hearing which recommended 10-2 to censure Corcoran. Subsequently, the full New Hampshire House voted to censure Corocoran 288-54.
