= Copernican system =

Copernican system may refer to:

- Copernican heliocentrism
- Rocks on the Earth's moon deposited during the Copernican period
