= Theaetetus (crater) =

Crater on the Moon

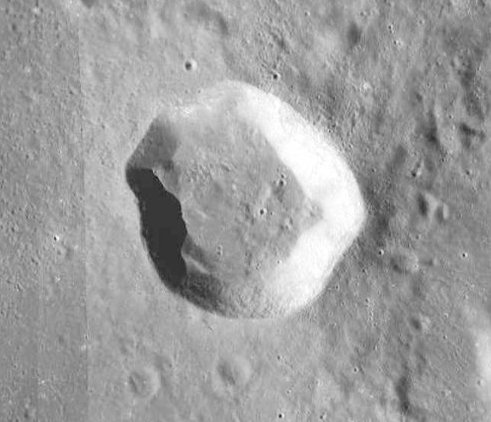
- LRO image
- Coordinates: 37.0°N 6.0°E
- Diameter: 25 km
- Depth: 2.8 km
- Colongitude: 354° at sunrise
- Eponym: Theaetetus

Theaetetus is a lunar impact crater that is located to the southeast of the crater Cassini near the eastern edge of Mare Imbrium. It was named after the ancient Greek mathematician Theaetetus. It lies just to the west of the Montes Caucasus range, which forms the eastern shore of the mare. To the southwest is the prominent crater Aristillus.

The rim of Theaetetus is distinctly polygonal in shape, with a slight rounding at the vertices. There is a low outer rampart and a slight central rise on the crater floor, which is offset to the northeast of the crater midpoint. The interior is otherwise relatively featureless, at a depth of 1.5 km below the surrounding plains.

This crater has been noted in the past as a site of possible transient lunar phenomena. In 1902, a white cloud was observed briefly in the vicinity of the crater. Other observers, including Patrick Moore and W. H. Pickering, have also noted unusual appearances in this area.

== Gallery ==
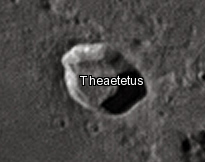
Theaetetus crater taken from Earth

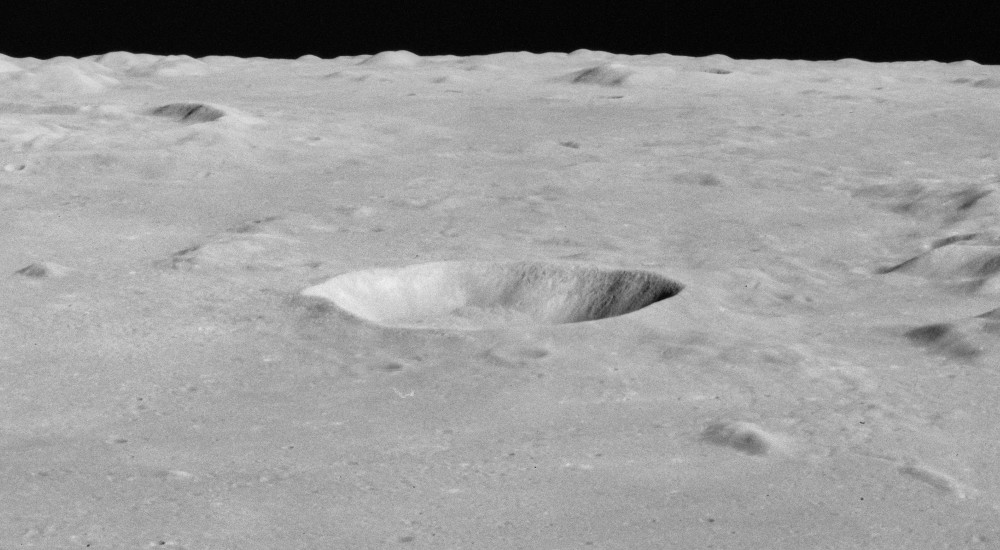
Oblique view from Apollo 15
