= Charles A. Wood =

American geologist

- Education: Brown University
- Known for: LPOD
- Scientific career
- Workplaces: Planetary Science Institute

Charles A. "Chuck" Wood is an American planetary geologist who currently is a Senior Scientist Emeritus of the Planetary Science Institute.

Wood earned his PhD in Planetary Geology from Brown University in 1979. Between 1980 and 1985, he worked as a Space Scientist at NASA's Johnson Space Center. From 1985 to 1990, he served as Chief of the Space Shuttle Earth Observations Office. Between 1990 and 2000, he chaired the Department of Space Studies at the University of North Dakota. From 2001 to 2003, he was Director of Education for the Biosphere 2 program while it was operated by Columbia University. In 2004, he joined the Planetary Science Institute as a Senior Scientist and simultaneously took on the role of Executive Director at the Center for Educational Technologies at Wheeling University.

Wood published a series of articles about the moon in Sky and Telescope magazine.

Wood ran the popular site Lunar Photo of the Day, or LPOD, from 2004 to 2014. The site posted a photo of the moon or about the moon daily, and included Wood's comments on it.

In 2018, the International Astronomical Union named asteroid 363115 Chuckwood in honor of Wood's work.

== Publications ==
- Our Phillips House: the life and home of an antebellum steam engine pioneer, May 3, 2022 by Charles A. Wood
- Wheeling 1850: the body in the cave, September 17, 2021 by Charles A. Wood
- Wood, C. A., & Radebaugh, J. (2020). Morphologic evidence for volcanic craters near Titan's north polar region. Journal of Geophysical Research: Planets, 125, e2019JE006036. https://doi.org/10.1029/2019JE006036
- 21st Century Atlas of the Moon, December 1, 2012 by Charles A. Wood, Maurice J. S. Collins
- The Modern Moon: A Personal View by Charles A. Wood, Published by Sky Pub Corp, Cambridge, MA, 2003
- The Kaguya Lunar Atlas: The Moon in High Resolution January 1, 2011 by Motomaro Shirao and Charles A. Wood
- Wood, Charles & Lopes, Rosaly & Stofan, Ellen & Paganelli, Flora & Elachi, Charles. (2005). Impact Craters on Titan? Cassini RADAR View. 36.
- Wood, Charles. (2000). Volcanoes of the World, Second Edition. EOS Transactions. 81. 536-536. 10.1029/EO081i045p00536-01.
- Wichman, R. & Wood, Charles. (1995). The Davy Crater Chain: Implications for tidal disruption in the Earth‐Moon System and elsewhere. Geophysical Research Letters - GEOPHYS RES LETT. 22. 10.1029/94GL02966.
- Wood, Charles & Fevig, R. & Willman, A. & Wormer, W.. (1995). Are Hermes and 1988 XB Parent Bodies of HED Meteorites? Comparisons of Dates of Meteorite Falls and NEA Orbit Close Approaches. 26. 1515.
- Wichman, R. & Wood, Charles. (1994). Comet Disruption and Crater Chain Formation in the Earth-Moon System. 25. 1491.
- Wood, Charles & Fevig, R. & Nordlie, John. (1994). An Asteroid Family Among the NEAs?. 25. 1507.
- Wood, Charles & Tam, Wesley. (1993). Morphologic classes of impact basins on Venus.
- Volcanoes of North America, Wood, Charles & Kienle, Jürgen. (1992).
- Duval, D. & Wood, Charles. (1992). Impact Crater Flows on Venus: Morphological Evidence for Complex Ejection Dynamics.
- Wood, Charles & Helfert, M.R. & Lulla, K.P. & Covey, R.O.. (1989). Earth Observations During Space Shuttle Flight: Sts‐26: Discovery's Mission to Earth. Geocarto International. 4. 55–63. 10.1080/10106048909354209.
- Wood, Charles. (1989). Geologic applications of Space Shuttle photography. Geocarto International. 4. 10.1080/10106048909354198.
- Helfert, Michael & Wood, Charles. (1989). The NASA Space Shuttle Earth Observations Office. Geocarto International. 4. 10.1080/10106048909354194.
- Hartmann, W. & Wood, Charles. (1971). Moon: Origin and Evolution of Multi-Ring Basins. The Moon. 3. p. 3-78. 10.1007/BF00620390.
