= Alexander Rose (geologist) =

- Born: 1781
- Died: 1860 (aged 78–79)
- Known for: Geology and mineralogy

Alexander Rose (1781 – 1860) of Edinburgh was a wood and ivory turner, following in the footsteps of his father, John, who came from Cromarty. He developed an interest in minerals and began a mineral collection, becoming a dealer in minerals. He later became a lecturer in geology and mineralogy at Queen's College, Edinburgh and was eventually nominated as a Fellow of the Royal Scottish Academy.

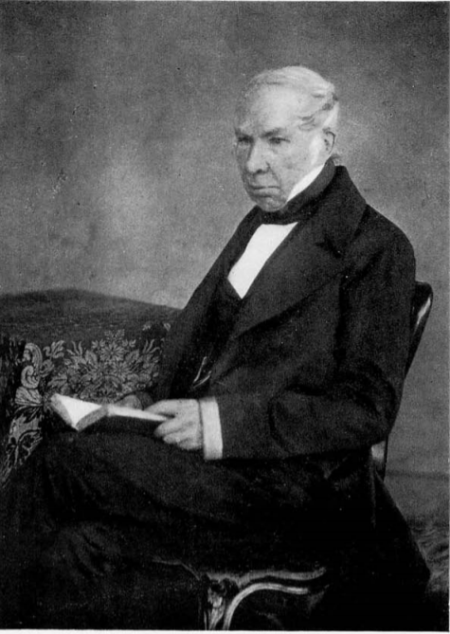
Alexander Rose, FRSA: a portrait published in Transactions of the Edinburgh Geological Society Vol. XIII, 1934 for EGS’s centenary celebrations

He was educated at the Royal High School and in 1816, he married Isabella Boyne. They had three sons and six daughters.

In 1834, eleven of his students set up the Edinburgh Geological Society, of which Rose became President for eleven years until 1846. He retired from active work in 1856 and died four years later.

The University of Edinburgh archives contain a number of letters from Scottish geologist Hugh Miller to Rose, commenting on some articles that Rose had written.

In 1956, Rose's grandson's widow Mary Tweedie Stodart Rose published a short biography of Rose.
