= Cassini (lunar crater) =

Crater on the Moon

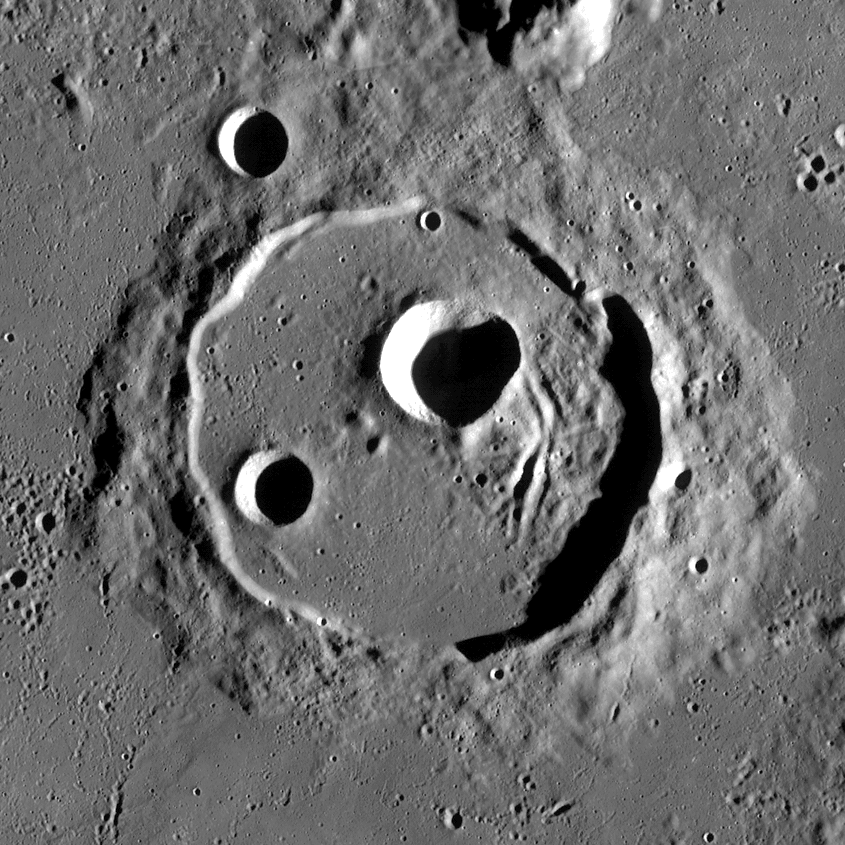
- LRO image
- Coordinates: 40.25°N 4.64°E
- Diameter: 56.88 km (35.34 mi)
- Depth: 1.2 km (0.75 mi)
- Colongitude: 356° at sunrise
- Formation: Lower Imbrian
- Eponym: Giovanni Cassini and Jacques Cassini

Cassini is a lunar impact crater that is located in the Palus Nebularum, at the eastern end of Mare Imbrium. Webb described it as, "a curious ring-plain; the narrow wall encloses a scarcely depressed space, and a deep ring-plain, which has considerable irregularity within". To the northeast is the Promontorium Agassiz, the southern tip of the Montes Alpes mountain range. South by south-east of Cassini is the crater Theaetetus. To the northwest is the lone peak Mons Piton.

The crater was named after Italian-French astronomer Giovanni Cassini (1625-1712) and his son, French astronomer Jacques Cassini (1677-1756). The name was originally introduced into lunar nomenclature by German astronomer J. H. Schröter in 1791. Its designation was officially adopted by the International Astronomical Union in 1935.

== Description ==
On the lunar geologic timescale, Cassini is a crater of Lower (Early) Lower Imbrian age. The floor is flooded, and is likely as old as the surrounding mare.The surface is peppered with a multitude of impacts, including a pair of significant craters contained entirely within the rim. Cassini A is the larger of these two, and it lies just north-east of the crater center. A hilly ridge area runs from this inner crater toward the south-east. Near the south-west rim of Cassini is the smaller crater Cassini B.

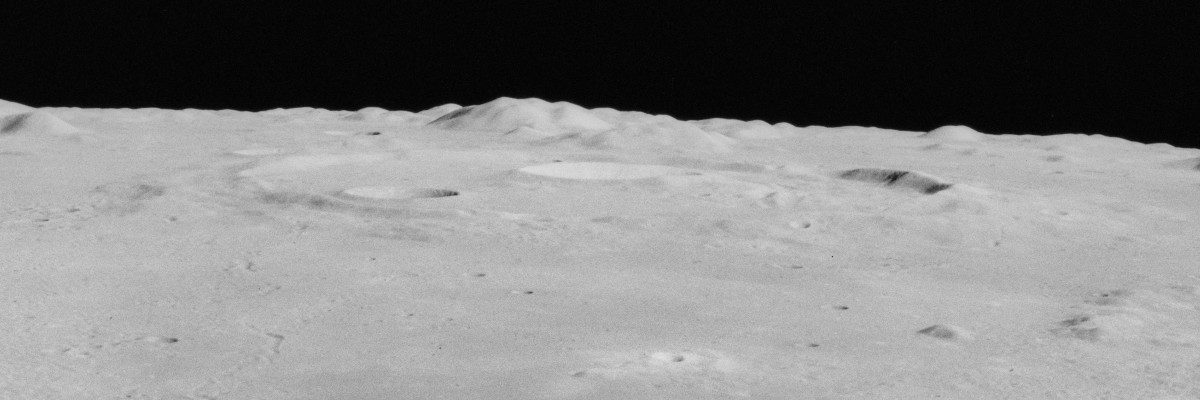
Oblique view from Apollo 15

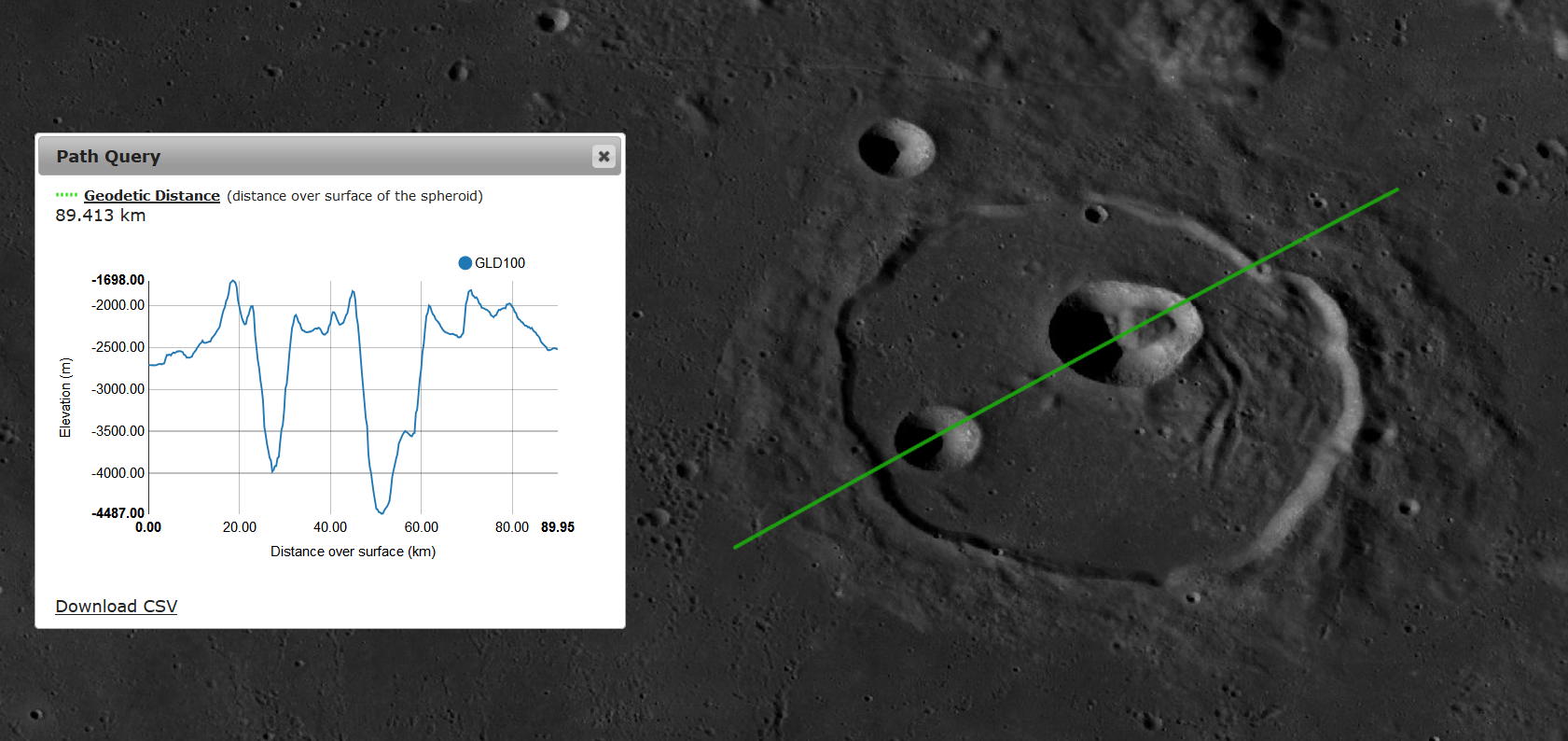
The crater Cassini, from Lunar Reconnaissance Orbiter data. Inset graph is elevations taken across the green line, from left to right, and includes dips at the locations of subcraters Cassini B (left) and Cassini A (right).

The walls of this crater are narrow and irregular in form but remain intact despite the lava flooding. Beyond the crater rim is a significant and irregular outer rampart.

For unknown reasons, this crater was omitted from early maps of the Moon. This crater is not of recent origin, however, so the omission was most likely an error on the part of the map-makers. Three instances of transient lunar phenomenon have been reported for this feature.

== Satellite craters ==
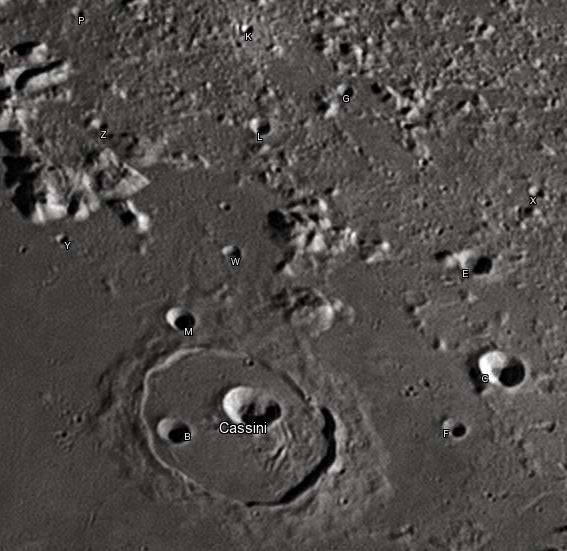
Cassini and its satellite craters taken from Earth in 2012 at the University of Hertfordshire's Bayfordbury Observatory with the telescopes Meade LX200 14" and Lumenera Skynyx 2-1

By convention these features are identified on lunar maps by placing the letter on the side of the crater midpoint that is closest to Cassini.

Cassini	Latitude	Longitude	Diameter
A	40.5° N	4.8° E	15 km
B	39.9° N	3.9° E	9 km
C	41.7° N	7.8° E	14 km
E	42.9° N	7.3° E	10 km
F	40.9° N	7.3° E	7 km
G	44.7° N	5.5° E	5 km
K	45.2° N	4.1° E	4 km
L	44.0° N	4.5° E	6 km
M	41.3° N	3.7° E	8 km
P	44.7° N	1.9° E	4 km
W	42.3° N	4.3° E	6 km
X	43.9° N	7.9° E	4 km
Y	41.9° N	2.2° E	3 km
Z	43.4° N	2.3° E	4 km

Cassini A has a large interior mound.

== Satellite crater Cassini C during full moon ==
Northeast of Cassini, between Montes Alpes and Montes Caucasus, bowl-shaped crater Cassini C looks like a bright white spot during full moon. The brightness of Cassini C is also noticeable on the photographic version of chart LAC 25 (page 50) in The Clementine Atlas of the Moon (Ben Bussey / Paul D. Spudis).

== See also ==
- Cassini (Martian crater)
