= Mont Blanc (Moon) =

Mountain on the Moon

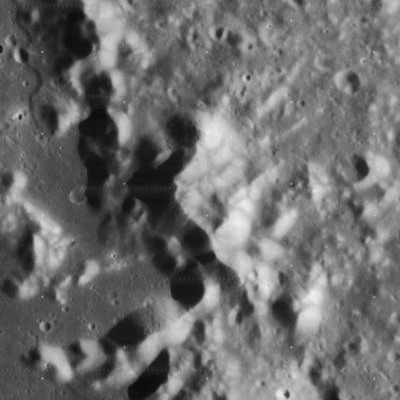
- Lunar Orbiter 4 image

Highest point
- Elevation: 3.7–3.8 km
- Listing: Lunar mountains
- Coordinates: 45.41°N 0.44°E

Geography
- Location: the Moon

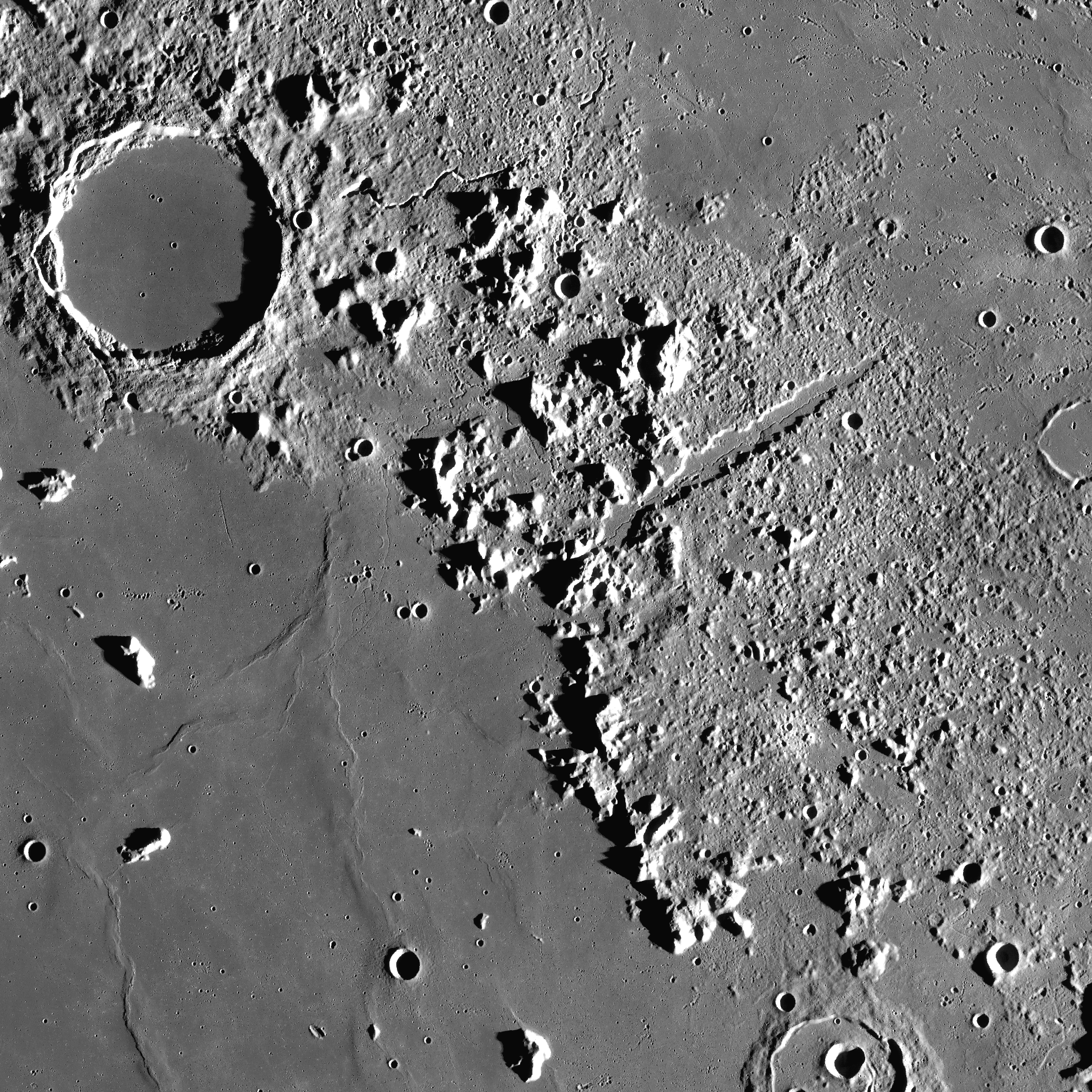
Location of Mont Blanc in lunar Alps

Mont Blanc is a mountain in the Montes Alpes range on the Moon. It is located on the western edge of the range, near the shore of Mare Imbrium, at 45.48°N 0.42°E. Its width is about 25 kilometers; the height is 3.7–3.8 km above adjacent plains of Mare Imbrium and 1.12 km above lunar level of zero elevation (a sphere with radius 1737.4 km).

The name of Mont Blanc, the highest mountain of terrestrial Alps, was proposed for this mountain by Johann Hieronymus Schröter. It was approved by International Astronomical Union in 1935. It is the only summit of Montes Alpes with proper name and the only extraterrestrial mountain, whose international name contains French word "Mont" instead of Latin "Mons".

Despite statements that lunar Mont Blanc, like terrestrial one, is a highest mountain of its Alps, measurements of Lunar Reconnaissance Orbiter show that it is only third, being 600 meters lower than the highest one and about 100 m lower than the second.

== Links ==
- Map of the region
- Mont Blanc in The-Moon Wiki

=== Related articles ===
- NASA Astronomy Picture of the Day: Plato and the Lunar Alps (4 December 2014) - including Mont Blanc
