= Archimedes (disambiguation) =

Archimedes was a celebrated mathematician and engineer of ancient Greece.

Archimedes may also refer to:

== People ==
=== Given name ===
- Archimedes of Tralles, ancient Greek writer
- Arquimedes Caminero (born 1987), Dominican baseball player
- Archimedes Patti (1913–1998), American intelligence officer
- Archimedes Robb (1814–1875), American politician from Pennsylvania
- Archimedes Russell (1840–1915), American architect
- Archimedes Trajano (1956–1977), Filipino torture victim
- Arquimedez Pozo (born 1973), Dominican baseball player

=== Other usages ===
- Alfred Thomas Archimedes Torbert (1833–1880), Union general officer during the American Civil War
- Pseudo-Archimedes, pseudo-anonymous writers of the Islamic Golden Age

== Places ==
- Archimedes (crater), an impact crater on the Moon
- Archimedes Ridge, a ridge in Alaska, United States
- Montes Archimedes, a mountain range on the Moon
- 3600 Archimedes, an asteroid

== Organizations ==
- Archimedes, Inc., an American healthcare modeling company
- Archimedes Foundation, an independent body established by the Estonian Ministry of Education and Research
- Archimedes Group, an Israeli intelligence agency

== Entertainment and media ==
- Archimedes, Merlin's owl in T. H. White's 1958 novel The Once and Future King and Disney's 1963 film The Sword in the Stone
- Archimedes, a character in the TV series The Little Mermaid
- Archimedes, the Medic's dove from Team Fortress 2

== Science and technology ==
- Archimedes (CAD), an open-source computer-aided design project
- Archimedes Geo3D, a software package for dynamic geometry in three dimensions
- Acorn Archimedes, a home computer
- Claw of Archimedes, an ancient weapon devised by Archimedes
- GNU Archimedes, the GNU package for Monte Carlo semiconductor devices simulations

== Transportation ==
- Archimedes (1797), a ship built in Britain
- SS Archimedes, a steamship built in Britain in 1839
- Archimedes (ship)
- Archimedes (rocket engine)

== Other uses ==
- Archimedes (bryozoan), an extinct genus of fenestrate bryozoan
- Archimedes pyrg, a species of mollusc in the family Hydrobiidae
- Crambus archimedes, a moth in the family Crambidae
- Garden of Archimedes, a museum of mathematics in Florence, Italy

== See also ==
- Archimede (disambiguation)
- Archimedean (disambiguation)
- List of things named after Archimedes
- Achaemenids

* Achaemenid Dynasty
* Achaemenid Empire
