= Archimede =

Archimede is the French and Italian form of Archimedes. It may also refer to:

== People ==
- Archimede Fusillo (born 1962), an Australian writer
- Archimede Morleo (born 1983), an Italian association football player
- Archimede Nardi (born 1916), an Italian association football player
- Archimede Vestri (1846–1904), an Italian architect
- Gerty Archimède (1909–1980), a French politician
- Luther Archimède (born 1999), a Guadeloupean association football player
- Félix Archimède Pouchet (1800–1872), a French naturalist

== Navy ==
- Archimède, a deep submergence vehicle (bathyscaphe) of the French Navy
- Archimede-class submarine, a 1930s submarine class of the Italian Navy, includes:
  - Italian submarine Archimede (1933), an Archimede-class submarine launched in 1933 and transferred to the Spanish Navy in 1937
- French submarine Archimède, one of two submarines by this name
- Italian submarine Archimede (1939), a Brin-class submarine launched in 1939 and sunk in 1943

== Other uses ==
- Archimede combined cycle power plant, a solar thermal field in Sicily, Italy
- Archimede construction systems are construction techniques achieving rhombic dodecahedral shapes, a space-filling geometry
- Archimède (band), a French rock band
- Archimede (watches), a German watch brand
- Archimede (company), an Italian film production company
- Archimède le clochard, a 1959 French drama film by Gilles Grangier
- Il piccolo Archimede, a 1979 Italian comedy-drama film by Gianni Amelio

== See also ==
- Archimedes (disambiguation)
