= List of things named after Archimedes =

Archimedes (c. 287 BC – c. 212 BC) is the eponym of all of the things (and topics) listed below.

== Mathematical concepts ==
- Archimedean absolute value
- Archimedean circle
- Archimedean copula
- Archimedean group
- Archimedean ordered field
- Archimedean point
- Archimedean property
- Archimedean solid
- Archimedean spiral
- Archimedean tiling
- Archimedes' axiom
- Archimedes' cattle problem
- Archimedes' hat-box theorem
- Archimedes constant
- Archimedes number
- Archimedes' quadruplets
- Archimedes Square
- Archimedes' twin circles
- Heron–Archimedes formula
- Non-Archimedean geometry
- Non-Archimedean ordered field
- Archimedes' ostomachion

== Physical concepts ==
- Archimedes paradox
- Archimedes' principle

== Technology ==
=== Things invented by Archimedes ===
- Archimedes' pulley
- Archimedes' screw
  - Archimedean turbine
- Archimedes' heat ray
- Claw of Archimedes
- Trammel of Archimedes

=== Other ===
- Archimedes bridge
- Archimede combined cycle power plant
- SS Archimedes
- Archimedes Group

==== Computer hardware and software ====
- Archimedes (CAD)
- Archimedes Geo3D
- Acorn Archimedes
- GNU Archimedes

== Oath ==
- The Archimedean Oath, taken by some engineers

== Astronomical names ==
- 3600 Archimedes
- Archimedes (crater)
- Montes Archimedes

== Written works of Archimedes ==
- Archimedes Palimpsest (Numerous written works of Archimedes survive. This is the only one whose conventional name includes his.)

== Other ==
- Archimedes, Merlin's owl in T. H. White's novel The Sword in the Stone and its adaptations
- Archimedes (bryozoan)
- Archimedes-lab.org
- Pseudo-Archimedes
