= Archimedes (ship) =

Several ships have been named Archimedes after Archimedes:

- Archimedes (1797) was a sailing ship launched at Sunderland. She traded between England and the Baltic until the British government chartered her as a transport c. 1809. She was lost in December 1811 while coming back from the Baltic.
- SS Archimedes was a steamship built in Britain in 1839, and the world's first steamship to be driven by a screw propeller.
- SS Ellan Vannin (1854) was a steamship built in Britain in 1854. Sold to the Kingdom of Sardinia in 1858, who renamed her Archimedes.
- SS Archimedes (1859), of 1,086 GRT, was built by Palmer Bros.& Co., Newcastle upon Tyne. In 1867 and 1868 she laid telegraph cables between Denmark and Norway and Denmark and England.
- Archimedes (1911 ship), of 6,869 GRT was built for the Den Line, who gave her the name Den of Airlie. The next year the Liverpool, Brazil & River Plate Steam Navigation purchased her and named her Archimedes. The Admiralty requisitioned her during WWI and she served as a supply ship from 1914 to 1919. In 1932 Ben Line Steamers purchased her and renamed her Benmacdhui. She hit a mine in 1941 and sank of Spurn Head.

== See also ==
- Italian submarine Archimede, either of two submarines by that name
