= Henry Wimshurst =

English shipbuilder

- Henry Wimshurst posing with a model of the stern of SS Archimedes.
- Born: 1804
- Died: 21 August 1884 (aged 79–80)
- Occupation: Shipbuilder
- Known for: Construction of Archimedes, world's first screw-propelled steamship

Henry Wimshurst (1804–1884) was a 19th-century British shipbuilder. Wimshurst was in business at Ratcliffe Cross Dock in east London. He is remembered primarily as the builder of Archimedes, the world's first propeller-driven steamship.

== Biography ==
While Wimshurst cannot take credit for Archimedes' revolutionary propulsion system—which was the invention of Francis Pettit Smith—he was an "ardent supporter" of Smith and his technological breakthrough. He would later claim to have proposed an improved, two-bladed version of Smith's original propeller which was subsequently installed on the vessel.

After completing Archimedes in 1839, Wimshurst built a second screw-propelled steamship in 1840, Novelty, described as the world's first screw-propelled cargo ship and the first screw-propelled ship to make a commercial voyage.

Wimshurst himself had an inventive turn of mind, and filed a number of patents during the course of his career. In 1854, he built an experimental rotary steam engine, which when installed in a 300-ton screw-propelled ship, reportedly achieved an rpm of 45 and a top speed of 14 mph in tests conducted by the firm of Boulton & Watt. By comparison, a pair of conventional direct-acting engines later installed in the same ship achieved an rpm of 28 and a top speed of only 8 mph. A few years prior in 1850, Wimshurst developed an instrument for measuring the power exerted by a propeller shaft—a forerunner of the torsion meter, an instrument for measuring the power transmitted by turbines.

Henry Wimshurst was the father of James Wimshurst, a late-19th century inventor who developed the Wimshurst machine and an early device for generating X-rays. He also had a daughter Emily Harriet who married Charles Umney, one of the most prominent chemists and druggists of his day. Emily died in Milan in 1912.
