= Wimshurst =

Wimshurst is an English surname. Notable people with the surname include:

- Henry Wimshurst (1804–1884), English shipbuilder
- James Wimshurst (1832–1903), English inventor, engineer and shipwright
  - Wimshurst machine, an electrostatic generator
- Ken Wimshurst (1938–2017), English footballer and manager
