= Steamship =

Type of steam-powered vessel

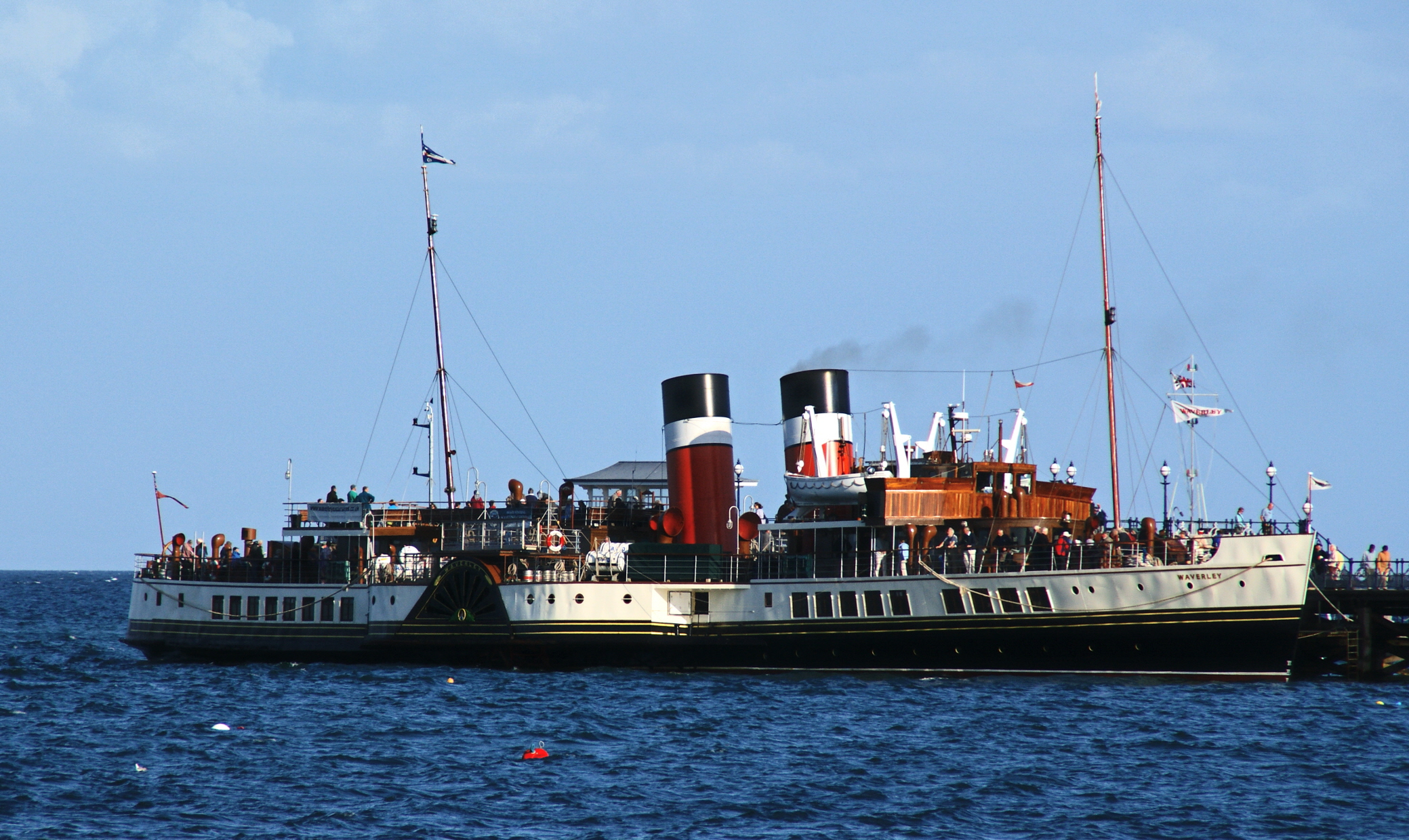
The paddle steamer PS Waverley at Swanage is the world's last seagoing paddle steamer

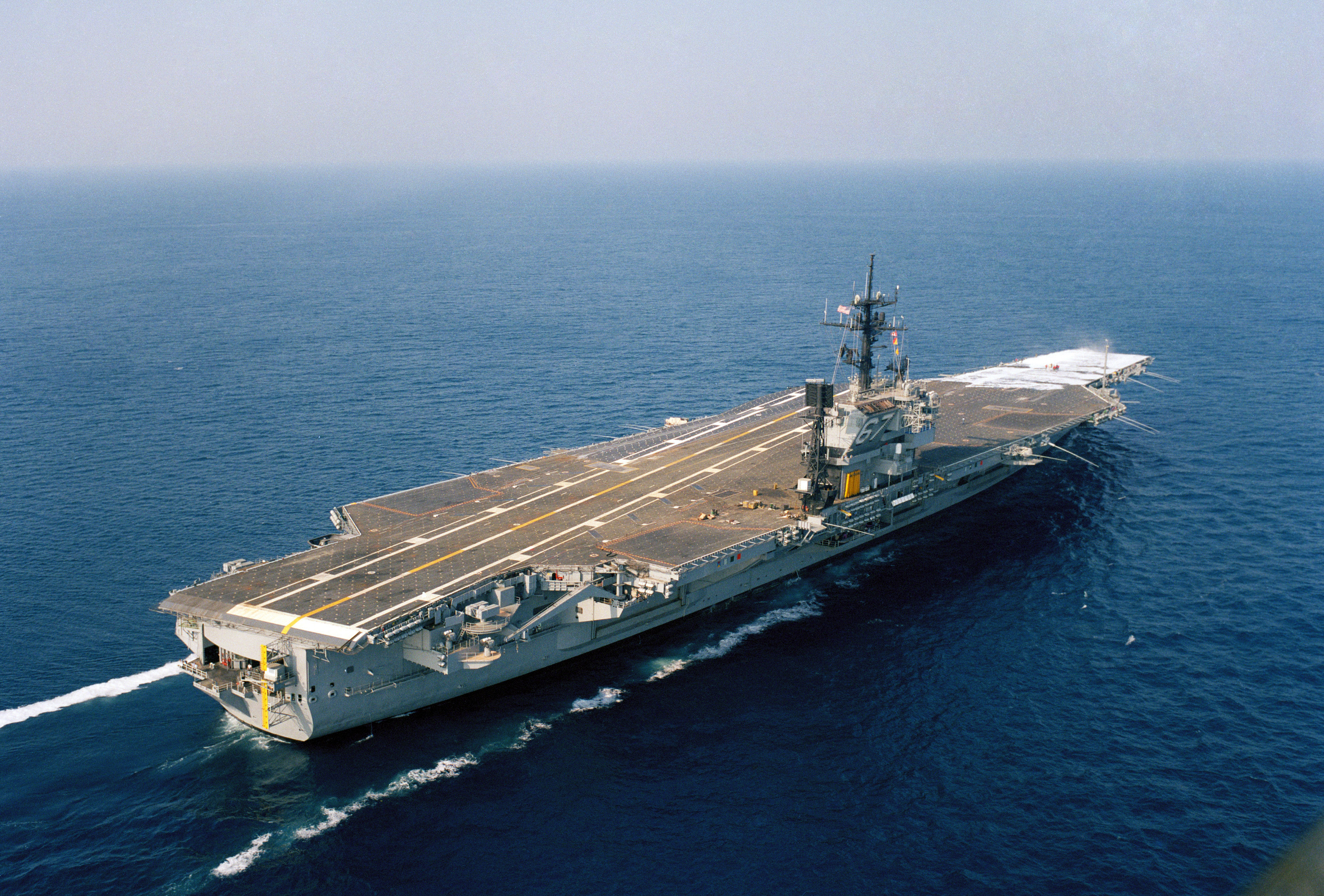
An aerial starboard quarter view of the aircraft carrier USS John F. Kennedy (CV-67), which was the last US Navy aircraft carrier to use conventional steam power

A steamship, often referred to as a steamer, is a type of steam-powered vessel, typically ocean-faring and seaworthy, that is propelled by one or more steam engines that typically move (turn) propellers or paddlewheels. The first steamships came into practical usage during the early 19th century; however, there were exceptions that came before.

Steamships usually use the prefix designations of "PS" for paddle steamer or "SS" for screw steamer (using a propeller or screw). As paddle steamers became less common, "SS" is incorrectly assumed by many to stand for "steamship". Ships powered by internal combustion engines use a prefix such as "MV" for motor vessel, so it is not correct to use "SS" for most modern vessels.

As steamships were less dependent on wind patterns, new trade routes opened up. The steamship has been described as a "major driver of the first wave of trade globalization (1870–1913)" and contributor to "an increase in international trade that was unprecedented in human history".

== History ==
Steamships were preceded by smaller vessels, called steamboats, conceived in the first half of the 18th century by Denis Papin, with the first working steamboat and paddle steamer, the Pyroscaphe, from 1783. Once the technology of steam was mastered at this level, steam engines were mounted on larger, and eventually, ocean-going vessels. Becoming reliable, and propelled by screw rather than paddlewheels, the technology changed the design of ships for faster, more economic propulsion.

Paddlewheels were effective means of propulsion under ideal conditions but otherwise had serious drawbacks. The paddlewheel performed best when it operated at a certain depth, however when the depth of the ship changed from added weight it further submerged the paddle wheel causing a substantial decrease in performance.

Within a few decades of the development of the river and canal steamboat, the first steamships began to cross the Atlantic Ocean. The first sea-going steamboat was Richard Wright's first steamboat Experiment, an ex-French lugger; she steamed from Leeds to Yarmouth in July 1813.

The first iron steamship to go to sea was the 116-ton Aaron Manby, built in 1821 by Aaron Manby at the Horseley Ironworks, and became the first iron-built vessel to put to sea when she crossed the English Channel in 1822, arriving in Paris on 22 June. She carried passengers and freight to Paris in 1822 at an average speed of 8 knots (9.2 mph; 15 km/h).

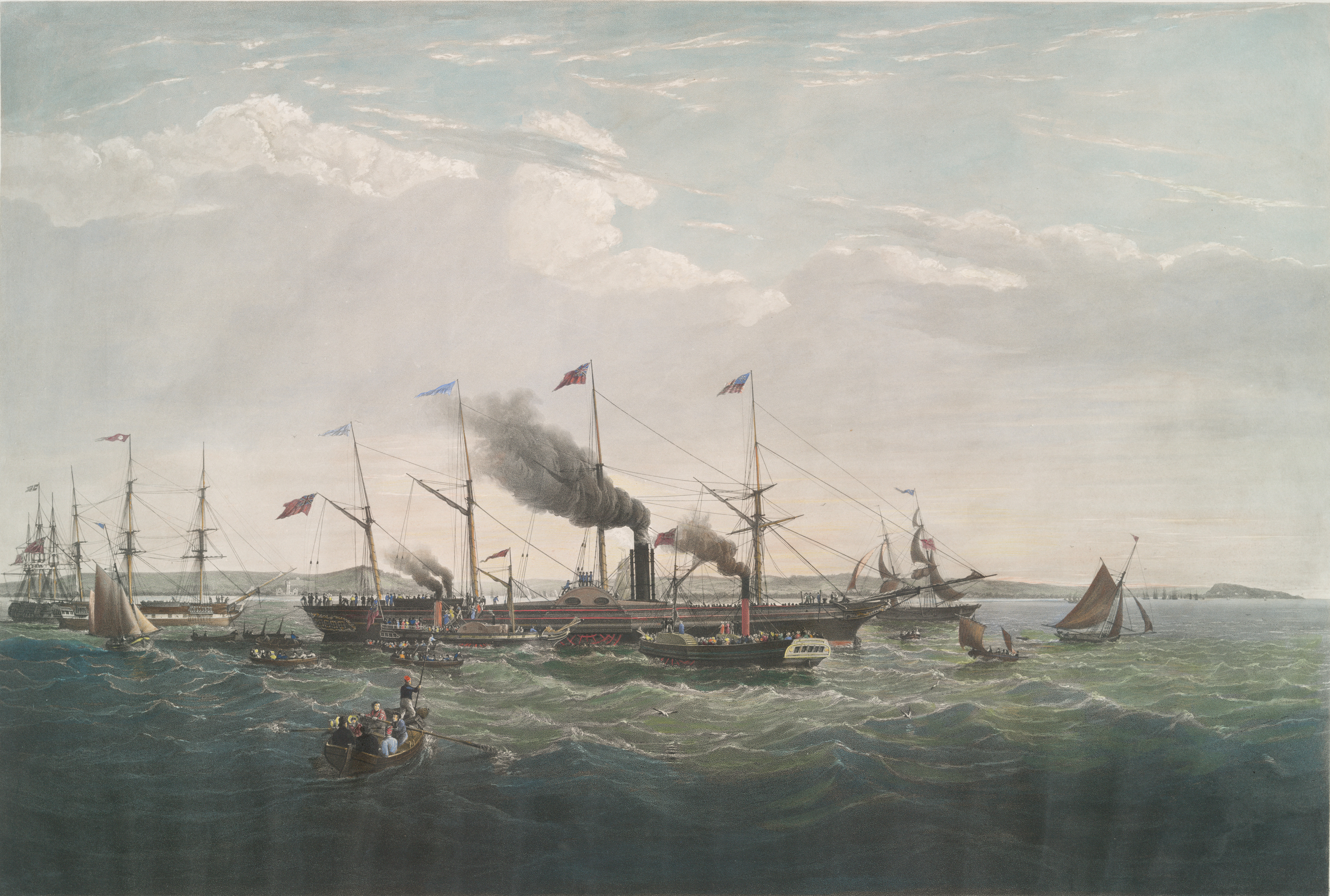
The side-wheel paddle steamer SS Great Western, the first purpose-built transatlantic steamship, on its maiden voyage in 1838

The American ship SS Savannah first crossed the Atlantic Ocean arriving in Liverpool, England, on June 20, 1819, although most of the voyage was actually made under sail. The first ship to make the transatlantic trip substantially under steam power may have been the British-built Dutch-owned Curaçao, a wooden 438-ton vessel built in Dover and powered by two 50 hp engines, which crossed from Hellevoetsluis, near Rotterdam on 26 April 1827 to Paramaribo, Surinam on 24 May, spending 11 days under steam on the way out and more on the return. Another claimant is the Canadian ship SS Royal William in 1833.

The first steamship purpose-built for regularly scheduled trans-Atlantic crossings was the British side-wheel paddle steamer SS Great Western built by Isambard Kingdom Brunel in 1838, which inaugurated the era of the trans-Atlantic ocean liner.

SS Archimedes, built in Britain in 1839 by Francis Pettit Smith, was the world's first screw propeller-driven steamship (Note: The emphasis here is on ship. There were a number of successful screw propeller driven vessels prior to Archimedes, including Smith's own Francis Smith and Ericsson's Francis B. Ogden and Robert F. Stockton. However, these vessels were boats—designed for service on inland waterways—as opposed to ships, built for seagoing service.) for open water seagoing. She had considerable influence on ship development, encouraging the adoption of screw propulsion by the Royal Navy, in addition to her influence on commercial vessels. The first screw-driven propeller steamship introduced in America was on a ship built by Thomas Clyde in 1844 and many more ships and routes followed.

== Screw-propeller steamers ==
Francis Pettit Smith 1836 patent for his propeller design originally fitted to the Archimedes

The key innovation that made ocean-going steamers viable was the change from the paddle-wheel to the screw-propeller as the mechanism of propulsion. These steamships quickly became more popular, because the propeller's efficiency was consistent regardless of the depth at which it operated. Being smaller in size and mass and being completely submerged, it was also far less prone to damage.

James Watt of Scotland is widely given credit for applying the first screw propeller to an engine at his Birmingham works, an early steam engine, beginning the use of a hydrodynamic screw for propulsion.

The development of screw propulsion relied on the following technological innovations.

Steam engines had to be designed with the power delivered at the bottom of the machinery, to give direct drive to the propeller shaft. A paddle steamer's engines drive a shaft that is positioned above the waterline, with the cylinders positioned below the shaft. SS Great Britain used chain drive to transmit power from a paddler's engine to the propeller shaft – the result of a late design change to propeller propulsion.

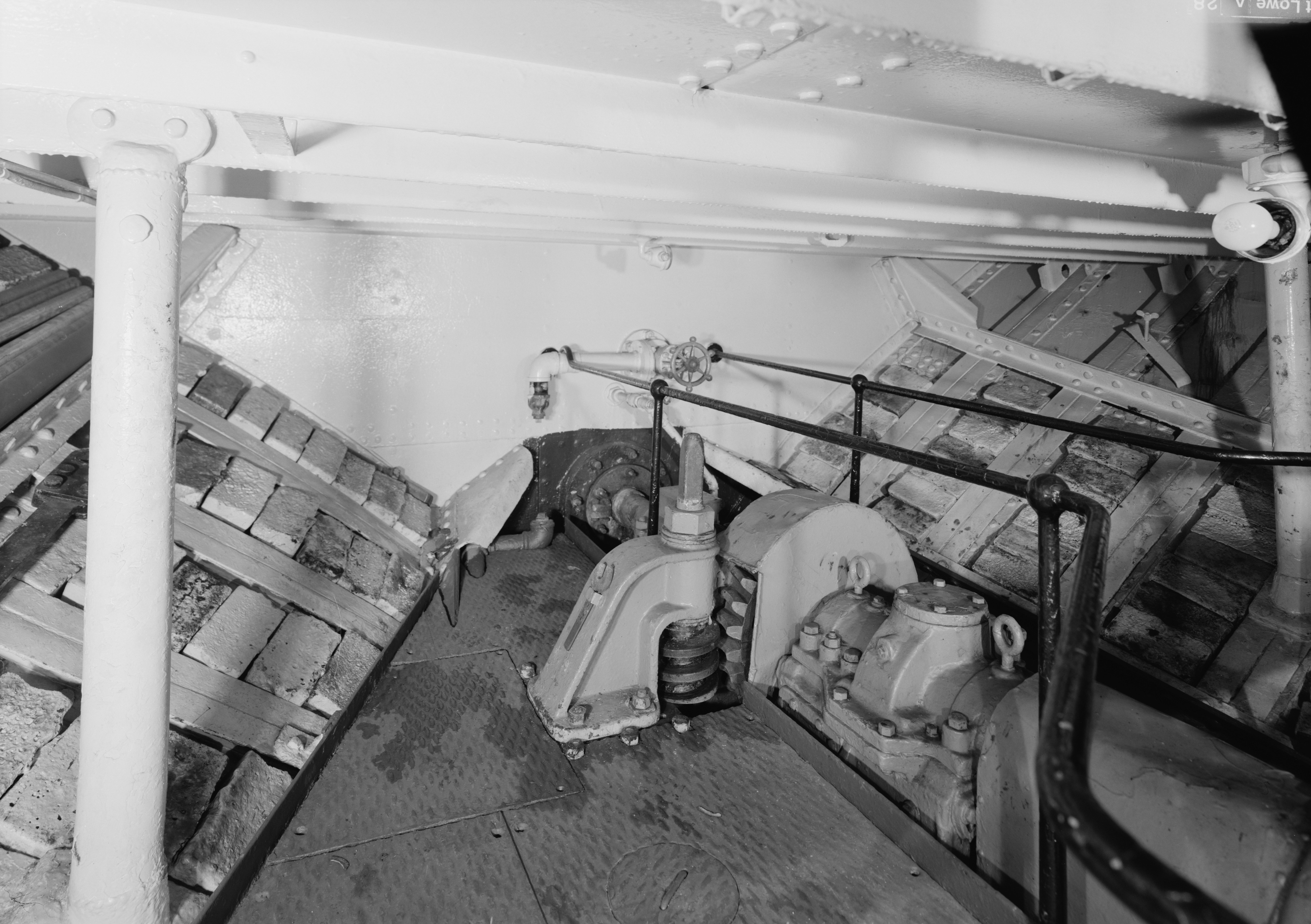
Image of stern tube and propeller shaft in a lighthouse ship

An effective stern tube and associated bearings were required. The stern tube contains the propeller shaft where it passes through the hull structure. It should provide an unrestricted delivery of power by the propeller shaft. The combination of hull and stern tube must avoid any flexing that will bend the shaft or cause uneven wear. The inboard end has a stuffing box that prevents water from entering the hull along the tube. Some early stern tubes were made of brass and operated as a water lubricated bearing along the entire length. In other instances a long bush of soft metal was fitted in the after end of the stern tube. SS Great Eastern had this arrangement fail on her first transatlantic voyage, with very large amounts of uneven wear. The problem was solved with a lignum vitae water-lubricated bearing, patented in 1858. This became standard practice and is in use today.

Since the motive power of screw propulsion is delivered along the shaft, a thrust bearing is needed to transfer that load to the hull without excessive friction. SS Great Britain had a 2 ft diameter gunmetal plate on the forward end of the shaft which bore against a steel plate attached to the engine beds. Water at 200 psi was injected between these two surfaces to lubricate and separate them. This arrangement was not sufficient for higher engine powers and oil lubricated "collar" thrust bearings became standard from the early 1850s. This was superseded at the beginning of the 20th century by floating pad bearing which automatically built up wedges of oil which could withstand bearing pressures of 500 psi or more.

== Name prefix ==
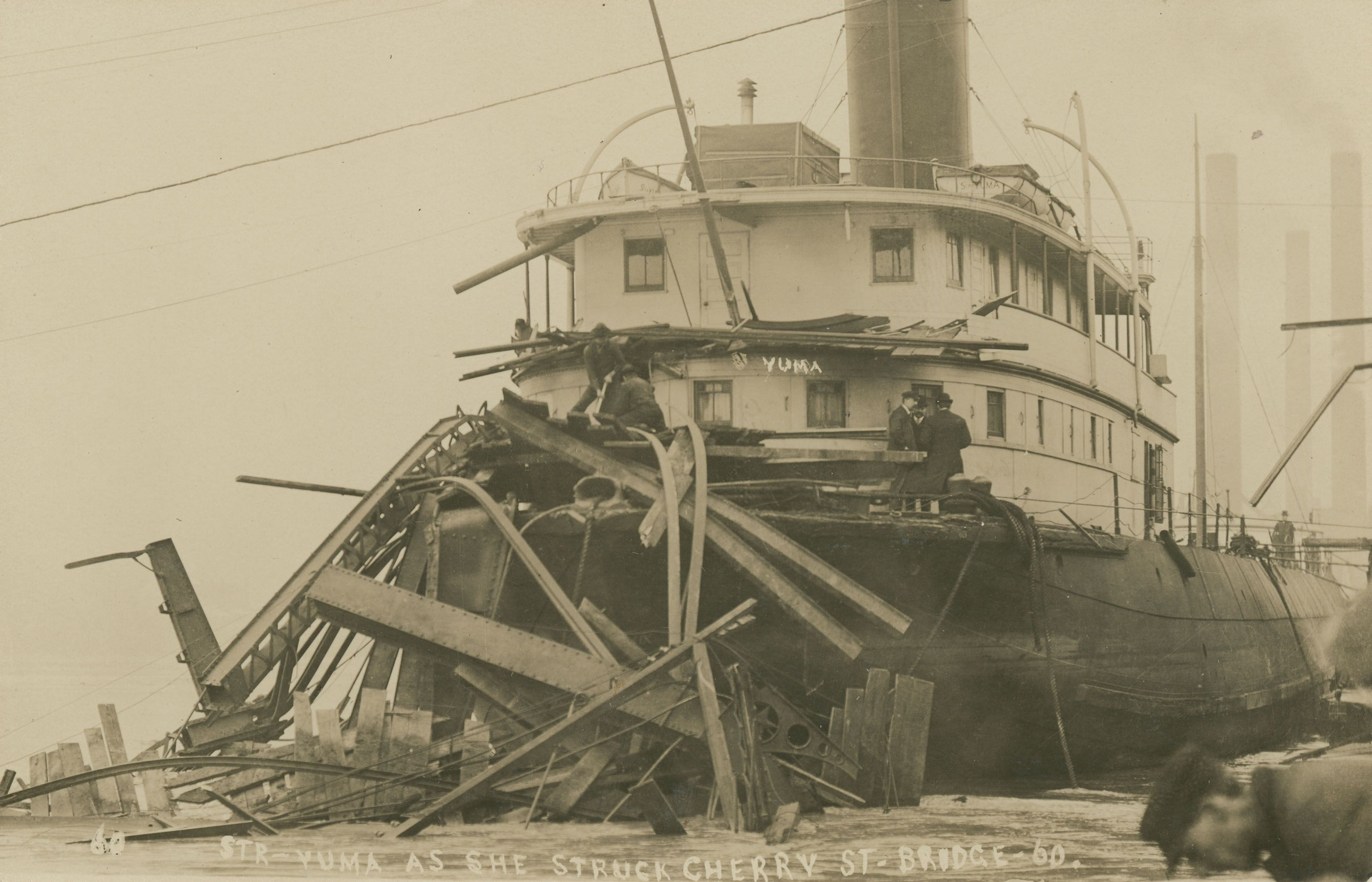
Steamer Yuma as she struck the Cherry Street Bridge in Toledo, Ohio

Steam-powered ships were named with a prefix designating their propeller configuration i.e. single, twin, triple-screw. Single-screw Steamship SS, Twin-Screw Steamship TSS, Triple-Screw Steamship TrSS. Steam turbine-driven ships had the prefix TS. In the UK the prefix RMS for Royal Mail Steamship overruled the screw configuration prefix.

== First ocean-going steamships ==
The first steamship credited with crossing the Atlantic Ocean between North America and Europe was the American ship SS Savannah, though she was actually a hybrid between a steamship and a sailing ship, with the first half of the journey making use of the steam engine. Savannah left the port of Savannah, Georgia, US, on 22 May 1819, arriving in Liverpool, England, on 20 June 1819; her steam engine having been in use for part of the time on 18 days (estimates vary from 8 to 80 hours). A claimant to the title of the first ship to make the transatlantic trip substantially under steam power is the British-built Dutch-owned Curaçao, a wooden 438-ton vessel built in Dover and powered by two 50 hp engines, which crossed from Hellevoetsluis, near Rotterdam on 26 April 1827 to Paramaribo, Surinam on 24 May, spending 11 days under steam on the way out and more on the return. Another claimant is the Canadian ship SS Royal William in 1833.

The British side-wheel paddle steamer SS Great Western was the first steamship purpose-built for regularly scheduled trans-Atlantic crossings, starting in 1838. In 1836 Isambard Kingdom Brunel and a group of Bristol investors formed the Great Western Steamship Company to build a line of steamships for the Bristol-New York route. The idea of regular scheduled transatlantic service was under discussion by several groups and the rival British and American Steam Navigation Company was established at the same time. Great Western's design sparked controversy from critics that contended that she was too big. The principle that Brunel understood was that the carrying capacity of a hull increases as the cube of its dimensions, while water resistance only increases as the square of its dimensions. This meant that large ships were more fuel efficient, something very important for long voyages across the Atlantic.

Great Western was an iron-strapped, wooden, side-wheel paddle steamer, with four masts to hoist the auxiliary sails. The sails were not just to provide auxiliary propulsion, but also were used in rough seas to keep the ship on an even keel and ensure that both paddle wheels remained in the water, driving the ship in a straight line. The hull was built of oak by traditional methods. She was the largest steamship for one year, until the British and American's British Queen went into service. Built at the shipyard of Patterson & Mercer in Bristol, Great Western was launched on 19 July 1837 and then sailed to London, where she was fitted with two side-lever steam engines from the firm of Maudslay, Sons & Field, producing 750 indicated horsepower between them. The ship proved satisfactory in service and initiated the transatlantic route, acting as a model for all following Atlantic paddle-steamers.

The Cunard Line's RMS Britannia began her first regular passenger and cargo service by a steamship in 1840, sailing from Liverpool to Boston.

In 1845 the revolutionary SS Great Britain, also built by Brunel, became the first iron-hulled screw-driven ship to cross the Atlantic. SS Great Britain was the first ship to combine these two innovations. After the initial success of its first liner, SS Great Western of 1838, the Great Western Steamship Company assembled the same engineering team that had collaborated so successfully before. This time however, Brunel, whose reputation was at its height, came to assert overall control over design of the ship—a state of affairs that would have far-reaching consequences for the company. Construction was carried out in a specially adapted dry dock in Bristol, England.

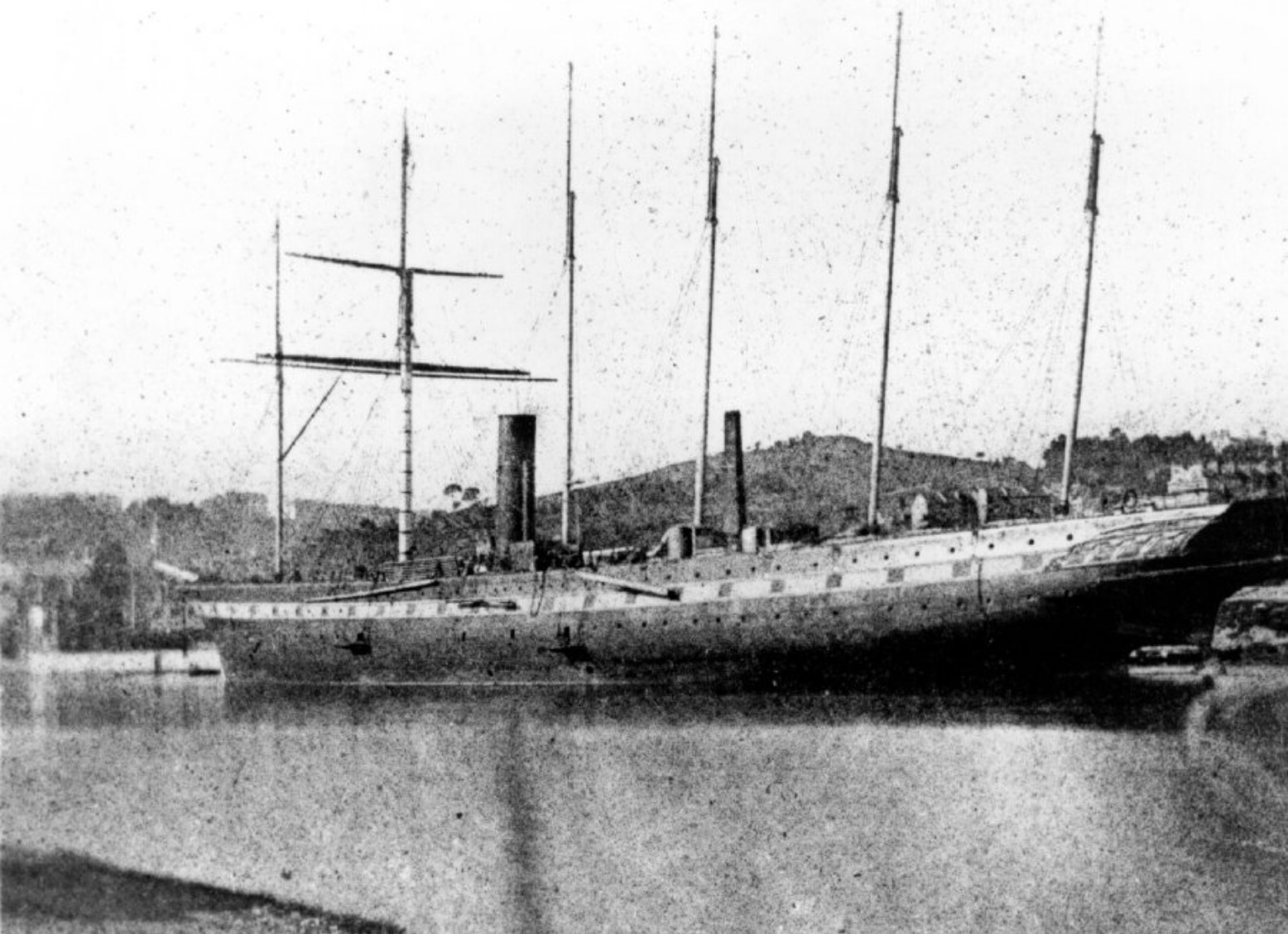
Great Britain in the Cumberland Basin, April 1844. This historic photograph by William Talbot is believed to be the first ever taken of a ship.

Brunel was given a chance to inspect John Laird's 213-foot (65 m) (English) channel packet ship Rainbow—the largest iron-hulled ship then in service—in 1838, and was soon converted to iron-hulled technology. He scrapped his plans to build a wooden ship and persuaded the company directors to build an iron-hulled ship. Iron's advantages included being much cheaper than wood, not being subject to dry rot or woodworm, and its much greater structural strength. The practical limit on the length of a wooden-hulled ship is about 300 feet, after which hogging—the flexing of the hull as waves pass beneath it—becomes too great. Iron hulls are far less subject to hogging, so that the potential size of an iron-hulled ship is much greater.

In the spring of 1840 Brunel also had the opportunity to inspect SS Archimedes, the first screw-propelled steamship, completed only a few months before by F. P. Smith's Propeller Steamship Company. Brunel had been looking into methods of improving the performance of Great Britain's paddlewheels, and took an immediate interest in the new technology, and Smith, sensing a prestigious new customer for his own company, agreed to lend Archimedes to Brunel for extended tests. Over several months, Smith and Brunel tested a number of different propellers on Archimedes in order to find the most efficient design, a four-bladed model submitted by Smith. When launched in 1843, Great Britain was by far the largest vessel afloat.

Brunel's last major project, SS Great Eastern, was built in 1854–1857 with the intent of linking Great Britain with India, via the Cape of Good Hope, without any coaling stops. This ship was arguably more revolutionary than her predecessors. She was one of the first ships to be built with a double hull with watertight compartments and was the first liner to have four funnels. She was the biggest liner throughout the rest of the 19th century with a gross tonnage of almost 20,000 tons and had a passenger-carrying capacity of thousands. The ship was ahead of her time and went through a turbulent history, never being put to her intended use. The first transatlantic steamer built of steel was SS Buenos Ayrean, built by Allan Line Royal Mail Steamers and entering service in 1879.

The first regular steamship service from the East Coast to the West Coast of the United States began on 28 February 1849, with the arrival of SS California in San Francisco Bay. The California left New York Harbor on 6 October 1848, rounded Cape Horn at the tip of South America, and arrived at San Francisco, California, after a four-month and 21-day journey. The first steamship to operate on the Pacific Ocean was the paddle steamer Beaver, launched in 1836 to service Hudson's Bay Company trading posts between Puget Sound Washington and Alaska.

== Long-distance commercial steamships ==
The most testing route for steam was from Britain or the East Coast of the U.S. to the Far East. The distance from either is roughly the same, between 14,000 to 15,000 nautical miles (26,000 to 28,000 km; 16,000 to 17,000 mi), traveling down the Atlantic, around the southern tip of Africa, and across the Indian Ocean. Before 1866, no steamship could carry enough coal to make this voyage and have enough space left to carry a commercial cargo.

A partial solution to this problem was adopted by the Peninsular and Oriental Steam Navigation Company (P&O), using an overland section between Alexandria and Suez, with connecting steamship routes along the Mediterranean and then through the Red Sea. While this worked for passengers and some high value cargo, sail was still the only solution for virtually all trade between China and Western Europe or East Coast America. Most notable of these cargoes was tea, typically carried in clippers.

Another partial solution was the Steam Auxiliary Ship – a vessel with a steam engine, but also rigged as a sailing vessel. The steam engine would only be used when conditions were unsuitable for sailing – in light or contrary winds. Some of this type (for instance Erl King) were built with propellers that could be lifted clear of the water to reduce drag when under sail power alone. These ships struggled to be successful on the route to China, as the standing rigging required when sailing was a handicap when steaming into a head wind, most notably against the southwest monsoon when returning with a cargo of new tea. Though the auxiliary steamers persisted in competing in far eastern trade for a few years (and it was Erl King that carried the first cargo of tea through the Suez Canal), they soon moved on to other routes.

What was needed was a big improvement in fuel efficiency. While the boilers for steam engines on land were allowed to run at high pressures, the Board of Trade (under the authority of the Merchant Shipping Act 1854) would not allow ships to exceed 20 or 25 pounds per square inch (140 or 170 kPa). Compound engines were a known source of improved efficiency – but generally not used at sea due to the low pressures available. Carnatic (1863), a P&O ship, had a compound engine – and achieved better efficiency than other ships of the time. Her boilers ran at 26 pounds per square inch (180 kPa) but relied on a substantial amount of superheat.

Alfred Holt, who had entered marine engineering and ship management after an apprenticeship in railway engineering, experimented with boiler pressures of 60 pounds per square inch (410 kPa) in Cleator. Holt was able to persuade the Board of Trade to allow these boiler pressures and, in partnership with his brother Phillip launched Agamemnon in 1865. Holt had designed a particularly compact compound engine and taken great care with the hull design, producing a light, strong, easily driven hull.

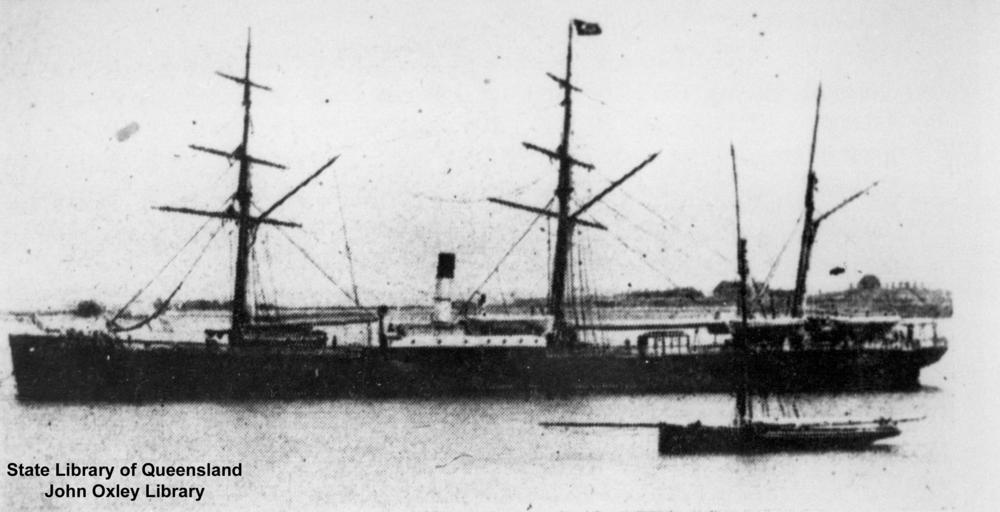
SS Agamemnon (1865)

The efficiency of Holt's package of boiler pressure, compound engine and hull design gave a ship that could steam at 10 knots on 20 long tons of coal a day. This fuel consumption was a saving from between 23 and 14 long tons a day, compared to other contemporary steamers. Not only did less coal need to be carried to travel a given distance, but fewer firemen were needed to fuel the boilers, so crew costs and their accommodation space were reduced. Agamemnon was able to sail from London to China with a coaling stop at Mauritius on the outward and return journey, with a time on passage substantially less than the competing sailing vessels. Holt had already ordered two sister ships to Agamemnon by the time she had returned from her first trip to China in 1866, operating these ships in the newly formed Blue Funnel Line. His competitors rapidly copied his ideas for their own new ships.

The opening of the Suez Canal in 1869 gave a distance saving of about 3,250 nautical miles (6,020 km; 3,740 mi) on the route from China to London. (Note: The distance by a modern shipping route calculator is 13,373 nautical miles (24,767 km; 15,389 mi) from London to Fuzhou via the Cape of Good Hope. Using the same calculator, a route through the Mediterranean and Suez Canal is 10,124 nautical miles (18,750 km; 11,650 mi). The difference is 3,249 nautical miles (6,017 km; 3,739 mi). A sailing vessel would take a longer route to obtain the best winds, so this comparison is only an approximation.) The canal was not a practical option for sailing vessels, as using a tug was difficult and expensive – so this distance saving was not available to them. Steamships immediately made use of this new waterway and found themselves in high demand in China for the start of the 1870 tea season. The steamships were able to obtain a much higher rate of freight than sailing ships and the insurance premium for the cargo was less. So successful were the steamers using the Suez Canal that, in 1871, 45 were built in Clyde shipyards alone for Far Eastern trade.

== Triple expansion engines ==
The 1947 paddle steamer PS Waverley is powered by a three-crank diagonal triple-expansion marine steam engine built by Rankin & Blackmore.

Throughout the 1870s, compound-engined steamships and sailing vessels coexisted in an economic equilibrium: the operating costs of steamships were still too high in certain trades, so sail was the only commercial option in many situations. The compound engine, where steam was expanded twice in two separate cylinders, still had inefficiencies. The solution was the triple expansion engine, in which steam was successively expanded in a high pressure, intermediate pressure and a low pressure cylinder.

The theory of this was established in the 1850s by John Elder, but it was clear that triple expansion engines needed steam at, by the standards of the day, very high pressures. The existing boiler technology could not deliver this. Wrought iron could not provide the strength for the higher pressures. Steel became available in larger quantities in the 1870s, but the quality was variable. The overall design of boilers was improved in the early 1860s, with the Scotch-type boilers – but at that date these still ran at the lower pressures that were then current.

The first ship fitted with triple expansion engines was Propontis (launched in 1874). She was fitted with boilers that operated at 150 pounds per square inch (1,000 kPa) – but these had technical problems and had to be replaced with ones that ran at 90 pounds per square inch (620 kPa). This substantially degraded performance.

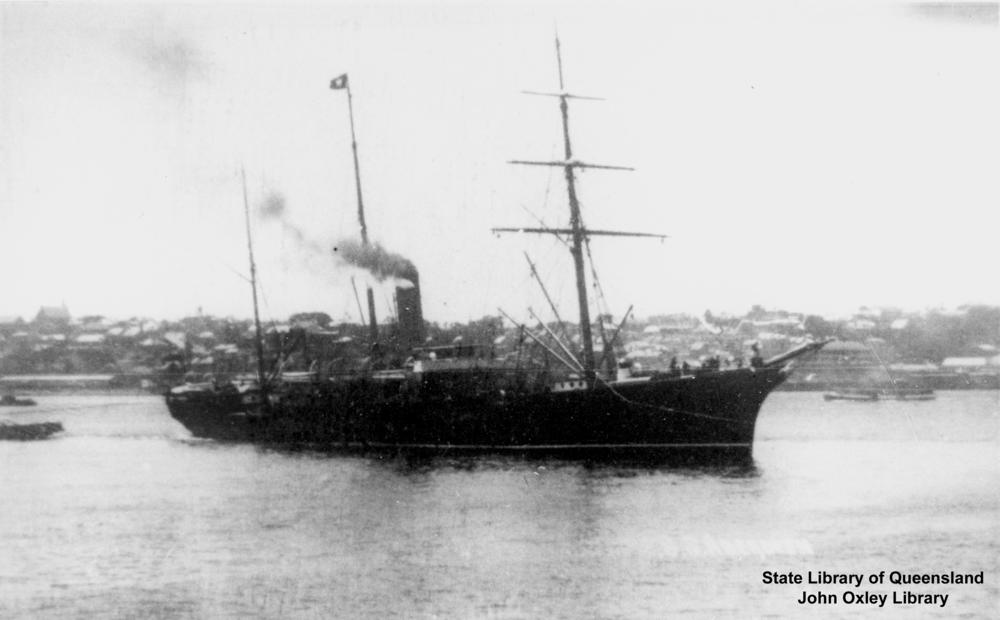
Aberdeen, the first successful commercial use of triple expansion engines

There were a few further experiments until SS Aberdeen (1881) went into service on the route from Britain to Australia. Her triple expansion engine was designed by Dr A C Kirk, the engineer who had developed the machinery for Propontis. The difference was the use of two double ended Scotch type steel boilers, running at 125 pounds per square inch (860 kPa). These boilers had patent corrugated furnaces that overcame the competing problems of heat transfer and sufficient strength to deal with the boiler pressure. Aberdeen was a marked success, achieving in trials, at 1,800 indicated horsepower, a fuel consumption of 1.28 pounds (0.58 kg) of coal per indicated horsepower. This was a reduction in fuel consumption of about 60%, compared to a typical steamer built ten years earlier. In service, this translated into less than 40 tons of coal a day when travelling at 13 knots (24 km/h; 15 mph). (Note: If this fuel consumption is compared to SS Agamemnon (1865) (previous section), the relative sizes and the cruising speeds of the two ships should be taken into account: Aberdeen 3,616GRT, 13 knots (24 km/h; 15 mph), Agamemnon 2,270GRT, 10 knots (19 km/h; 12 mph).) Her maiden outward voyage to Melbourne took 42 days, with one coaling stop, carrying 4,000 tons of cargo.

Other similar ships were rapidly brought into service over the next few years. By 1885 the usual boiler pressure was 150 pounds per square inch (1,000 kPa) and virtually all ocean-going steamships being built were ordered with triple expansion engines. Within a few years, new installations were running at 200 pounds per square inch (1,400 kPa). The tramp steamers that operated at the end of the 1880s could sail at 9 knots (17 km/h; 10 mph) with a fuel consumption of 0.5 ounces (14 g) of coal per ton mile travelled. This level of efficiency meant that steamships could now operate as the primary method of maritime transport in the vast majority of commercial situations. In 1890, steamers constituted 57% of world's tonnage, and by World War I their share raised to 93%.

== Era of the ocean liner ==
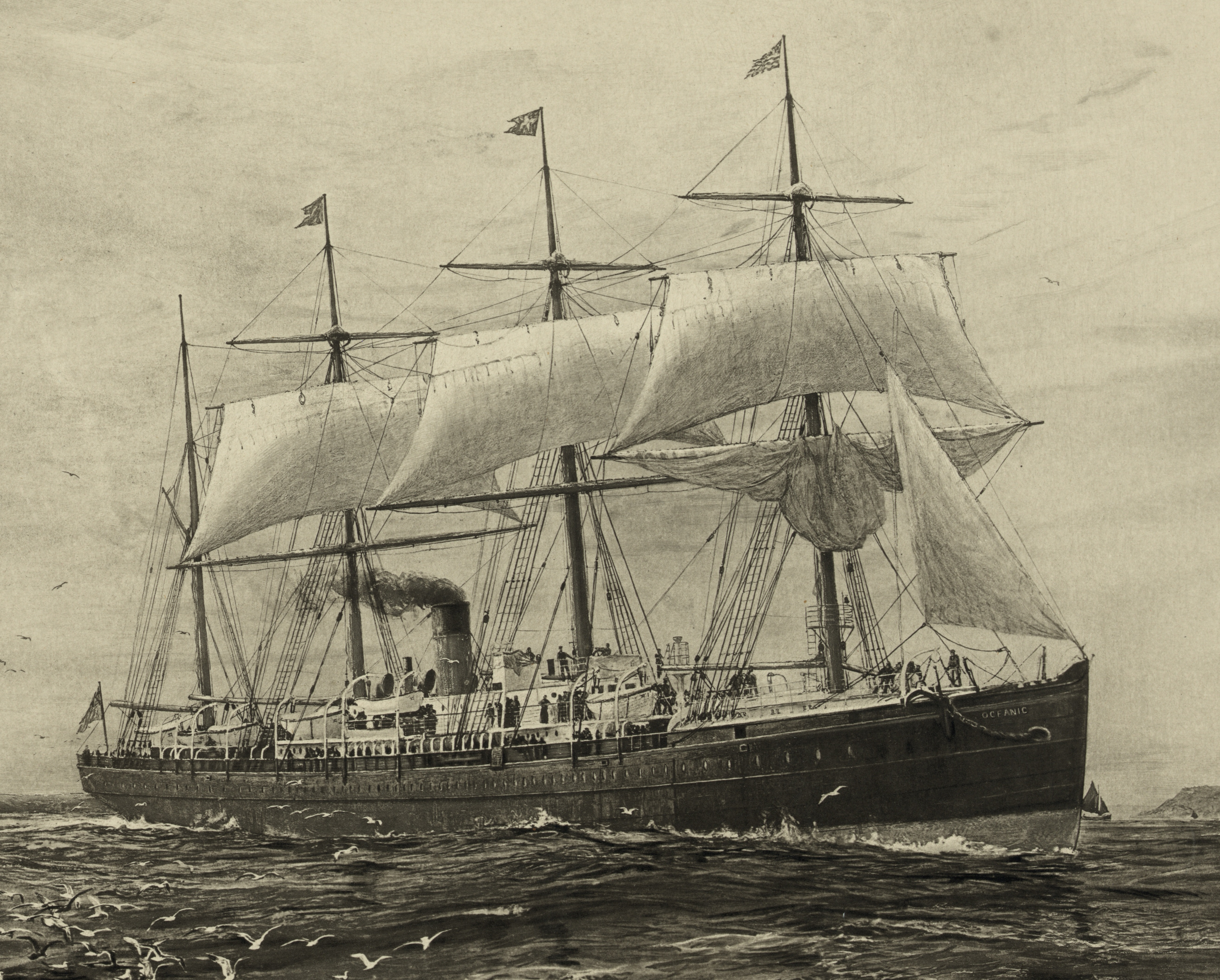
SS Oceanic, an important turning point in ocean liner design

By 1870 a number of inventions such as the screw propeller, the compound engine, and the triple-expansion engine made trans-oceanic shipping on a large scale economically viable. In 1870 the White Star Line’s RMS Oceanic set a new standard for ocean travel by having its first-class cabins amidships, with the added amenity of large portholes, electricity and running water. The size of ocean liners increased from 1880 to meet the needs of the human migration to the United States and Australia.

RMS Umbria and her sister ship RMS Etruria were the last two Cunard liners of the period to be fitted with auxiliary sails. Both ships were built by John Elder & Co. of Glasgow, Scotland, in 1884. They were record breakers by the standards of the time, and were the largest liners then in service, plying the Liverpool to New York route.

== 1900–present ==
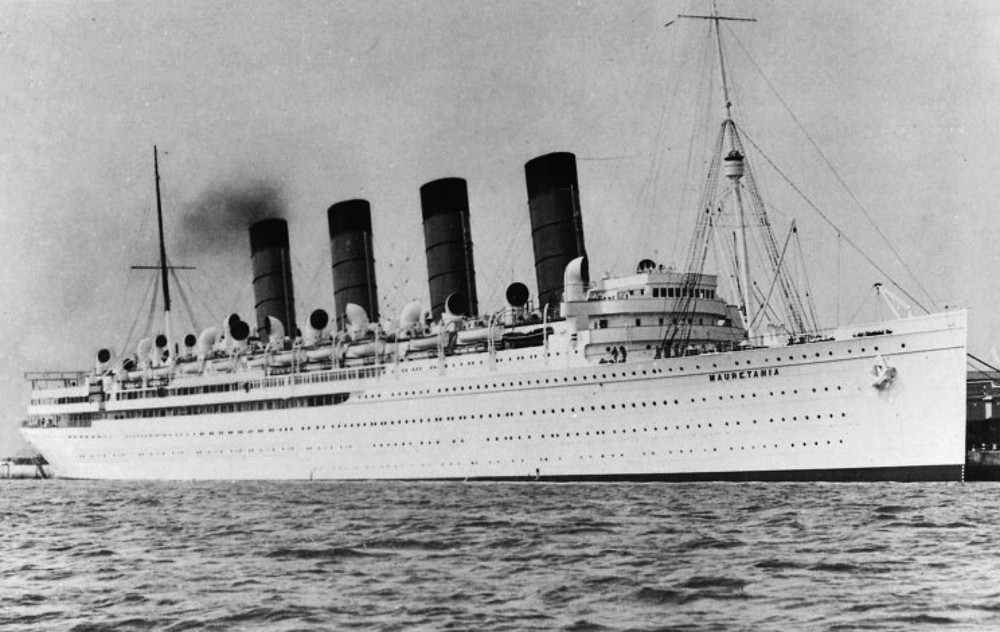
RMS Mauretania, built in 1906, and the sister to the RMS Lusitania, was one of the first ocean liners to adopt the steam turbine.

After the demonstration by British engineer Charles Parsons of his steam turbine-driven yacht, Turbinia, in 1897, the use of steam turbines for propulsion quickly spread. The Cunard RMS Mauretania, built in 1906 was one of the first ocean liners to use the steam turbine (with a late design change shortly before her keel was laid down) and was soon followed by all subsequent liners.

RMS Titanic was the largest steamship in the world when she sank in 1912; a subsequent major sinking of a steamer was that of the RMS Lusitania, as an act of World War I.

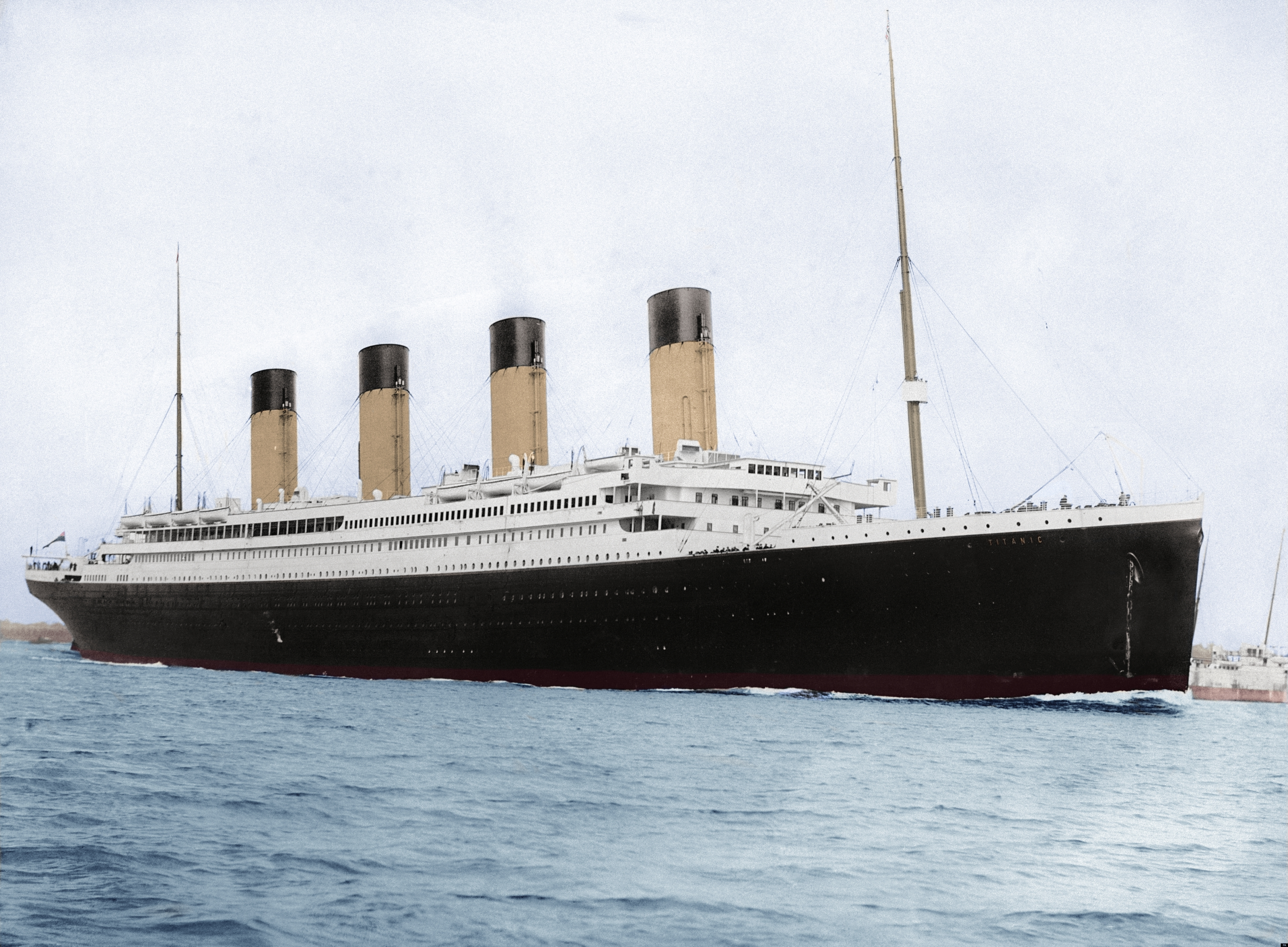
RMS Titanic was the largest steamship in the world in 1912 (sank on 15 April).

Launched in 1938, RMS Queen Elizabeth was the largest passenger steamship ever built. Launched in 1969, Queen Elizabeth 2 (QE2) was the last passenger steamship to cross the Atlantic Ocean on a scheduled liner voyage before she was converted to diesels in 1986. The last major passenger ship built with steam turbines was the Fairsky, launched in 1984, later Atlantic Star, reportedly sold to Turkish shipbreakers in 2013.

Most luxury yachts at the end of the 19th and early 20th centuries were steam driven (see luxury yacht; also Cox & King yachts). Thomas Assheton Smith was an English aristocrat who forwarded the design of the steam yacht in conjunction with the Scottish marine engineer Robert Napier.

== Decline of the steamship ==
By World War II, steamers still constituted 73% of world's tonnage, and similar percentage remained in early 1950s. The decline of the steamship began soon thereafter. Many had been lost in the war, and marine diesel engines had finally matured as an economical and viable alternative to steam power. The diesel engine had far better thermal efficiency than the reciprocating steam engine, and was far easier to control. Diesel engines also required far less supervision and maintenance than steam engines, and as an internal combustion engine it did not need boilers or a water supply, therefore was more space efficient and cheaper to build.

The Liberty ships were the last major steamship class equipped with reciprocating engines. The last Victory ships had already been equipped with marine diesels, and diesel engines superseded both steamers and windjammers soon after World War Two. Most steamers were used up to their maximum economical life span, and no commercial ocean-going steamers with reciprocating engines have been built since the 1960s.

Most larger warships of the world's navies were propelled by steam turbines burning bunker fuel in both World Wars, apart from obsolete ships with reciprocating machines from the turn of the century, and rare cases of usage of diesel engines in larger warships. Steam turbines burning fuel remained in warship construction until the end of the Cold War (e.g. Russian aircraft carrier Admiral Kuznetsov), because of needs of high power and speed, although from 1970s they were mostly replaced by gas turbines. Large naval vessels and submarines continue to be operated with steam turbines, using nuclear reactors to boil the water. NS Savannah, was the first nuclear-powered cargo-passenger ship, and was built in the late 1950s as a demonstration project for the potential use of nuclear energy.

Thousands of Liberty Ships (powered by steam piston engines) and Victory Ships (powered by steam turbine engines) were built in World War II. A few of these survive as floating museums and sail occasionally: SS Jeremiah O'Brien, SS John W. Brown, SS American Victory, SS Lane Victory, and SS Red Oak Victory.

A steam turbine ship can be either direct propulsion (the turbines, equipped with a reduction gear, rotate directly the propellers), or turboelectric (the turbines rotate electric generators, which in turn feed electric motors operating the propellers).

While steam turbine-driven merchant ships such as the Algol-class cargo ships (1972–1973), ALP Pacesetter-class container ships (1973–1974) and very large crude carriers were built until the 1970s, the use of steam for marine propulsion in the commercial market has declined dramatically due to the development of more efficient diesel engines. One notable exception are LNG carriers which use boil-off gas from the cargo tanks as fuel. However, even there the development of dual-fuel engines has pushed steam turbines into a niche market with about 10% market share in newbuildings in 2013. Lately, there has been some development in hybrid power plants where the steam turbine is used together with gas engines. As of August 2017 the newest class of Steam Turbine ships are the Seri Camellia-class LNG carriers built by Hyundai Heavy Industries (HHI) starting in 2016 and comprising five units.

Most steamships today are powered by steam turbines. Nuclear powered ships are substantially similar to steam turbine vessels, however, the boiler is heated, not by heat of combustion, but by the heat generated by nuclear reactor. Most atomic-powered ships today are either aircraft carriers or submarines.

== See also ==
- Steamboat
- Paddle steamer
- Marine steam engine
- History of the steam engine
- International relations of the Great Powers (1814–1919)#Travel
- List of steam frigates of the United States Navy
- Bibliography of early American naval history
- Lake steamers of North America

== Bibliography ==
- Armstrong, Robert (1859). High Speed Steam Navigation and Steamship Perfection. London: E. & F. N. Spon. p. 59.
- Bennett, Frank M. (1897). The Steam Navy of the United States. Philadelphia: Warren & Company. p. 502. ISBN 978-1-176-46792-1.
- Bradford, James C. (1986). Captains of the Old Steam Navy: Makers of the American Tradition, 1840–1880. Naval Institute Press. p. 356. ISBN 9780870210136.
- Canney, Donald L. (1998). Lincoln's Navy: The Ships, Men and Organization, 1861–65. Naval Institute Press. p. 232.
- Carlton, John (2012). Marine Propellers and Propulsion. Butterworth-Heinemann. p. 544. ISBN 9780080971230.
- Dawson, Charles (2006). "Thomas Assheton Smith's Steam Yachts". The Mariner's Mirror. 92 (3): 331ff.
- Dickinson, Henry Winram (1913). Robert Fulton, Engineer and Artist: His Life and Works. New York, London: John Lane. p. 333.
- Lambert, Andrew (1984). Battleships in Transition, the Creation of the Steam Battlefleet 1815–1860. Conway Maritime Press. ISBN 0-85177-315-X.
- Mahan, Alfred Thayer (1907). From Sail to Steam: Recollections of Naval Life. New York, London: Harper & Brothers. p. 325.
- Pacific Mail Steamship Company (1867). A Sketch of the New Route to China and Japan. San Francisco: Turnbull and Smith. p. 104.
- Sewall, John Smith (1905). The Logbook of the Captain's Clerk: Adventures in the China Seas. J. S. Sewall. p. 278.
- Thurston, Robert Henry (1891). Robert Fulton: His Life and Its Results. New York: Dodd, Mead and Company. p. 194.
- Walske, Steve (2011). Civil War Blockade Mail: 1861 - 1865 (PDF). Steve Walske Exhibition at WESTPEX 2011. p. 32.
