= Archimedean =

Archimedean means of or pertaining to or named in honor of the Greek mathematician Archimedes and may refer to:

== Mathematics ==
- Archimedean absolute value
- Archimedean circle
- Archimedean constant
- Archimedean copula
- Archimedean field
- Archimedean group
- Archimedean point
- Archimedean property
- Archimedean solid
- Archimedean spiral
- Archimedean tiling

== Other uses ==
- Archimedean screw
- Claw of Archimedes
- The Archimedeans, the mathematical society of the University of Cambridge
- Archimedean Dynasty
- Archimedean Upper Conservatory

== See also ==
- Archimedes (disambiguation)
