= Archimedes Foundation =

Estonian governmental organization

The Archimedes Foundation is an independent body established by the Estonian government in 1997 with the objective to coordinate and implement different international and national programmes and projects in the field of training, education, research, technological development and innovation.

== Main tasks ==
The website of the Foundation lists the following as its main tasks.

In the field of R&D

- Estonian National Contact Point Organisation for EU Seventh Research Framework Programme. Main objective is to consult and train Estonian researchers and enterprises for successful participation in programme.
- Coordinator of COST (European Cooperation in the field of Scientific and Technical Research) in Estonia.
- Administrative body for Estonian Research Council.
- Conducting research evaluation in Estonia.
- Helpdesk for the Estonian Research Information System – an information channel for submitting and processing grant applications and for submitting and confirming project report.
- Bridgehead organisation of EURAXESS services that provides solutions for mobile researchers.
- Coordinating science communication and popularisation initiatives
- Implementing Agency of Structural Support for the period 2007–2013

In the field of Education

- Implementing body of EU Lifelong Learning Programme.
- Acting as the Estonian Higher Education Quality Agency that carries out institutional accreditation and quality assessment of study groups.
- Acting as the Academic Recognition Information Centre (Estonian ENIC/NARIC) that evaluates foreign qualifications and provides information about foreign higher education systems.
- Coordining national initiatives aimed to improve the competitiveness of Estonian higher education, such as scholarship schemes for improving mobility, quality enhancement of the HE programmes, supporting development of educational sciences and marketing Estonian higher education and research abroad.

In the field of Youth

- Implementing body for EU Youth in Action programme
- Organising research contests for students and coordinating the activities of Young Scientists' Association

== See also ==
- ERASMUS programme
- PHARE
