= Archimede Nardi =

Italian footballer (born 1916)

Personal information
- Date of birth: 19 April 1916
- Place of birth: Rome, Italy
- Position: Goalkeeper

Senior career*
Years	Team	Apps	(Gls)
1935–1936	Spes		
1936–1938	Roma	3	(0)
1939–1940	Salernitana		
1940–1942	Stabia		
1942–1943	Littorio Roma		
1943–1944	Avia Roma	11	(0)
- * Club domestic league appearances and goals

Archimede Nardi (born 19 April 1916) was an Italian professional football player. He played three games in the Serie A in the 1936/37 season for A.S. Roma.
