= Archimedes of Tralles =

Ancient Greek writer

Archimedes of Tralles (/ˌɑːrkɪˈmiːdiːz/ AR-kim-EE-deez; Ancient Greek: Ἀρχιμήδης ὁ Τραλλιανός, romanized: Arkhimḗdēs ho Trallianós) was an Ancient Greek writer and grammarian who wrote commentaries on the works of Homer and Plato, and also a work upon mechanics. None of his works have survived to the present day.
