= French submarine Archimède =

Two submarines of the French Navy have borne the name Archimède:

- French submarine Archimède (1909), launched in 1909 and sold for scrap in 1921
- French submarine Archimède (Q142), a Redoutable-class submarine launched in 1930 and decommissioned in 1952
