= Italian submarine Archimede =

Archimede has been borne by at least two ships of the Italian Navy:

- Italian submarine Archimede (1933), an Archimede-class submarine launched in 1933 and transferred to the Spanish Navy in 1937.
- Italian submarine Archimede (1939), a Brin-class submarine launched in 1939 and sunk in 1943.
