= Archimede Fusillo =

Australian author

- Born: 1962 (age 63–64); Australia
- Education: University of Melbourne
- Occupation: Writer
- Writing career
- Years active: 1990s–present
- Genres: Children's literature Young adult fiction
- Subjects: Italian-Australian experience, family, identity, masculinity
- Notable works: Sparring with Shadows; The Dons; Bruises; Uncorked
- Notable awards: Alan Marshall Award; Mary Grant Bruce Award for Children's Literature

Archimede Fusillo (born 1962) is an Australian author of books for children and young adults.

== Biography ==
His Italian background has inspired many of his novels and short stories, starting with Memories of Sunday Cricket in the Street and Talking to the Moon. Fusillo has written three novels, Sparring with Shadows (1997)-this first novel being nominated for the Italy in the World awards in 2000-and The Dons (2002) and Bruises (2004) published by Penguin Books Australia. He writes for the Aussie Bites children's series and his book was Uncorked. He is a regular contributor to the ethnic magazine Italy Down Under, and his fiction has been published in Imago, Spring 1998. His short stories have been published in anthologies like Hunger and Other Stories published by the Australian Association for the Teachers of English and Wakefield Press in 2003.

== Personal life ==
Many of Fusillo's books have been written from personal experiences. He attended a boys' school, where his year 10 teacher helped and encouraged him to write. A childhood friend Fusillo's was in an accident while the two boys were playing on top of a wheat silo, and his friend slipped and died instantly. Other stories, such as The Dons, which relates to his Nonna, who contracted dementia.

Fusillo lives in Melbourne with his wife, son and daughter. He worked as a features writer for two international magazines. He completed a BA degree in Psychology at Melbourne University. His stories are often set in the '60s and '70s, when he was growing up as a first-generation Italian-Australian, and often explore themes of manhood. He has won the Alan Marshall Award and the Mary Grant Bruce Award for Children's Literature for his short stories, and The Dons received a Family Therapy Award for Literature. He is a popular speaker at the Melbourne Writers Festival especially on the Schools panels. He was also at the Mildura Writers' Festival and the Northern Writers Festival, and regularly speaks at schools in Melbourne and interstate.

In 2005 Fusillo was the judge for the Eastern Regional Libraries National Storywriting Competition.
