= Archimedes Ridge =

Coordinates: 69°10′30″N 161°16′30″W

Archimedes Ridge [el. 1,585 ft (483 m)] is a ridge in North Slope Borough, Alaska, in the United States.

Archimedes Ridge was so named because it resembles an Archimedes' screw in aerial photographs.
