= Pseudo-Archimedes =

Pseudo-Archimedes is a name given to pseudo-anonymous authors writing under the name of 'Archimedes' as quoted by various sources of the Islamic Golden Age such as Al-Jazari for the construction of water clocks. Archimedes himself is not known to have written any such manuscript as almost all the manuscripts have been lost.

The only surviving manuscript from a Pseudo-Archimedes, the Book of Lemmas, is an Arabic treatise not listed among Archimedes' works. Donald Routledge Hill is of the opinion that the original manuscript may have been Greek but that most of the manuscript was written by later Arabic authors. The scholar A. G. Drachmann believes that the manuscript was assembled from Arabic translations of various Greek sources, including works by Hero of Alexandria, Ctesibius, and Philon. The manuscript is referred to by the Arabic engineers Ridwan and Al-Jazari.
