= Francis Pettit Smith =

English inventor, one of the inventors of the screw propeller

Sir Francis Pettit Smith
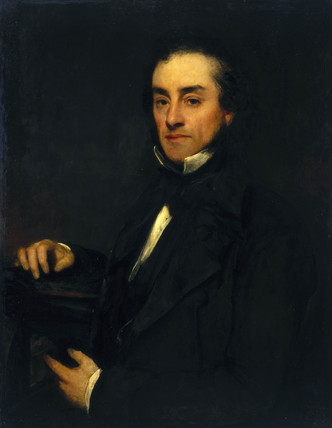
- 1856 portrait by Sir William Boxall
- Born: 9 February 1808; Hythe, Kent, England
- Died: 12 February 1874 (aged 66); Kensington, London, England
- Occupations: Farmer, engineer
- Known for: Invention of the screw propeller

Sir Francis Pettit Smith (9 February 1808 – 12 February 1874) was an English inventor and, along with John Ericsson, one of the inventors of the screw propeller. He was also the driving force behind the construction of the world's first screw-propelled steamship, SS Archimedes.

== Early life ==
He was born at Hythe, Kent, where his father was the postmaster. He was educated at a private school in Ashford run by the Rev. Alexander Power, before working as a grazing Farmer on Romney Marsh, later moving to Hendon in Middlesex where he continued to farm for 37 years.

== Career ==
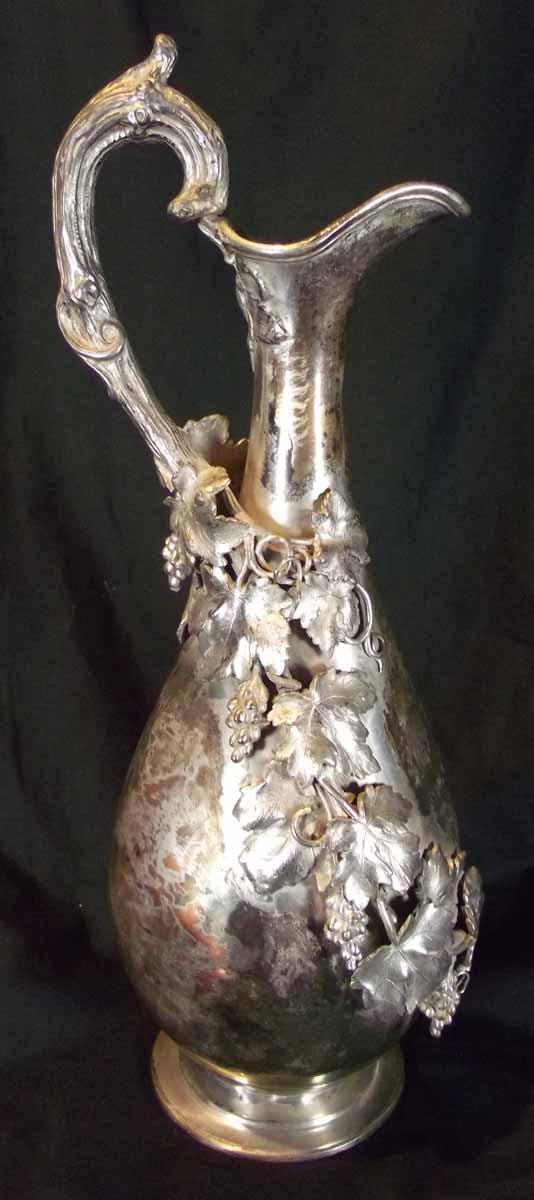
Claret jug presented to Smith in 1858, at The Mariners Museum

As a boy he had acquired great skill in the construction of model boats and took special interest in their means of propulsion. This fascination with boats remained with him and in 1834 on a reservoir near his farm, he perfected the propulsion of a model boat by means of a wooden screw driven by a spring. He became utterly convinced that this form of propulsion was greatly superior to the paddle wheel which was in use at the time. The following year he built a superior model with which he performed a number of experiments at Hendon and in 1836 took out a patent for propelling vessels by means of a screw revolving beneath the water at the stern.

After securing the financial backing of several parties, he helped organise the Propeller Steamship Company which in 1839 built the world's first successful screw-propelled steamship, SS Archimedes. A short time later, he was instrumental in persuading Isambard Kingdom Brunel to change the design of the SS Great Britain from paddle to screw propulsion, by lending Brunel the Archimedes for several months. He also helped persuade the British Admiralty to adopt screw propulsion.

Smith travelled on the SS Great Britain in May 1852, between Liverpool and New York.

== Later life ==
Between 1864 and 1870 he resided at 17 Sydenham Hill SE26, near Crystal Palace Park, a fact noted on a Blue Plaque.

In 1860 the government appointed him to the post of curator of the Patent Museum at South Kensington. In 1871 a knighthood was conferred upon him.

Smith died at 15 Thurloe Place, South Kensington in February 1874, and is buried in St Leonards Cemetery, Hythe, Kent.

== Personal life ==
Smith married twice and had children by each marriage.

== Legacy ==
Smith negotiated with the Governors of Dulwich College for the lease of a plot of land on Sydenham Hill where he built his house named Centra House in 1864. The house was designed by Charles Barry, Jr. (the eldest son of Sir Charles Barry). The house still stands today. In the grounds Smith had planted a considerable shrubbery and had use of woodlands down to College Road. A later resident added a Pulhamite fountain and small grotto to the rear of the residence and renamed the house Dilkoosh. It was later renamed to its present title – Fountain House.
