= GNU Archimedes =

Free software to simulate semiconductors

- Original author: Jean Michel Sellier
- Developer: GNU project
- Stable release: 2.0.1 / 30 April 2013
- Operating system: Linux, UNIX
- Type: TCAD
- License: 2007: GPL-3.0-or-later (Note: GPL-3.0-or-later since 2007-08-25 (0.0.8).); 2004: GPL-2.0-or-later (Note: GPL-2.0-or-later from 2004-10-12 (0.0.1) until 2007-01-10 (0.0.7).)
- Website: gnu.org/software/archimedes/

Archimedes is a TCAD package for use by engineers to design and simulate submicron and mesoscopic semiconductor devices. Archimedes is free software and thus it can be copied, modified and redistributed under GPL. Archimedes uses the Ensemble Monte Carlo method and is able to simulate physics effects and transport for electrons and heavy holes in Silicon, Germanium, GaAs, InSb, AlSb, AlAs, AlxInxSb, AlxIn(1-x)Sb, AlP, AlSb, GaP, GaSb, InP and their compounds (III-V semiconductor materials), along with Silicon Oxide. Applied and/or self-consistent electrostatic and magnetic fields are handled with the Poisson and Faraday equations.

The GNU project has announced in May, 2012 that the software package Aeneas will be substituted by Archimedes, making this one the GNU package for Monte Carlo semiconductor devices simulations.

== Introduction ==
Archimedes is the GNU package for semiconductor device simulations that has been released for the first time on 2005 under GPL. It has been created by Jean Michel Sellier who is, since then, the leader of the project and the main developer. It is a free software and thus it can be copied, modified and redistributed under GPL.

Archimedes belongs to the family of TCAD software, i.e. tools utilized to assist the development of technologically relevant products. In particular, this package assists engineers in designing and simulating submicron and mesoscopic semiconductor devices. In a next-future version Archimedes will also be able to simulate nanodevices, using the Wigner Monte Carlo formalism (an experimental release can be found at). Today Archimedes is used in several big companies for simulation and production purposes.

Archimedes is also useful for teaching purposes since everybody can access the sources, modify and test them. Today, it is used for teaching courses in several hundreds universities all around the world. Furthermore, a simplified version, developed for students, is available on nanoHUB.org.

The Ensemble Monte Carlo method is the method that Archimedes uses to simulate and predict the behavior of a devices. Being the Monte Carlo very stable and reliable, Archimedes can be used to know the characteristics of a device even before this last is built.

The physics and geometry of a device is described simply by a script, which makes, in this sense, Archimedes a powerful tool for the simulation of quite general semiconductor devices.

Archimedes is able to simulate physics effects and transport for electrons and heavy holes in Silicon, Germanium, GaAs, InSb, AlSb, AlAs, AlxInxSb, AlxIn(1-x)Sb, AlP, AlSb, GaP, GaSb, InP and their compounds (III-V semiconductor materials), along with Silicon Oxide, the applied and/or self-consistent electrostatic and magnetic fields by means of Poisson and Faraday equations. It is also able to deal with heterostructures.

== Boltzmann transport equation ==
The Boltzmann transport equation model has been the main tool used in the analysis of transport in semiconductors. The BTE equation is given by:

$$\frac{\partial f}{\partial t}
+ \frac{1}{\hbar} \nabla_k E(k) \nabla_r f
+ \frac{qF(r)}{\hbar} \nabla_k f
= \left[\frac{\partial f}{\partial t}\right]_\mathrm{collision}$$

$$v = \frac{1}{\hbar} \nabla_k E(k)$$

The distribution function, f, is a dimensionless function which is used to extract all observables of interest and gives a full depiction of electron distribution in both real and k-space. Further, it physically represents the probability of particle occupation of energy k at position r and time t. In addition, due to being a seven-dimensional integro-differential equation (six dimensions in the phase space and one in time) the solution to the BTE is cumbersome and can be solved in closed analytical form under very special restrictions. Numerically, solution to the BTE is employed using either a deterministic method or a stochastic method. The deterministic method solution is based on a grid-based numerical method such as the spherical harmonics approach, whereas the Monte Carlo is the stochastic approach used to solve the BTE.

== Monte Carlo method ==
The semiclassical Monte Carlo method is a statistical method used to yield exact solution to the Boltzmann transport equation which includes complex band structure and scattering processes. This approach is semiclassical for the reason that scattering mechanisms are treated quantum mechanically using the Fermi's Golden Rule, whereas the transport between scattering events is treated using the classical particle notion. The Monte Carlo model in essence tracks the particle trajectory at each free flight and chooses a corresponding scattering mechanism stochastically. Two of the great advantages of semiclassical Monte Carlo are its capability to provide accurate quantum mechanical treatment of various distinct scattering mechanisms within the scattering terms, and the absence of assumption about the form of carrier distribution in energy or k-space. The semiclassical equation describing the motion of an electron is

$$\frac{dr}{dt} = \frac{1}{\hbar} \nabla_k E(k)$$

$$\frac{dk}{dt} = \frac{qF(r)}{\hbar}$$

where F is the electric field, E(k) is the energy dispersion relation, and k is the momentum wave vector. To solve the above equation, one needs strong knowledge of the band structure (E(k)). The E(k) relation describes how the particle moves inside the device, in addition to depicting useful information necessary for transport such as the density of states (DOS) and the particle velocity. A Full-band E(K) relation can be obtained using the semi-empirical pseudopotential method.

== Screenshots ==
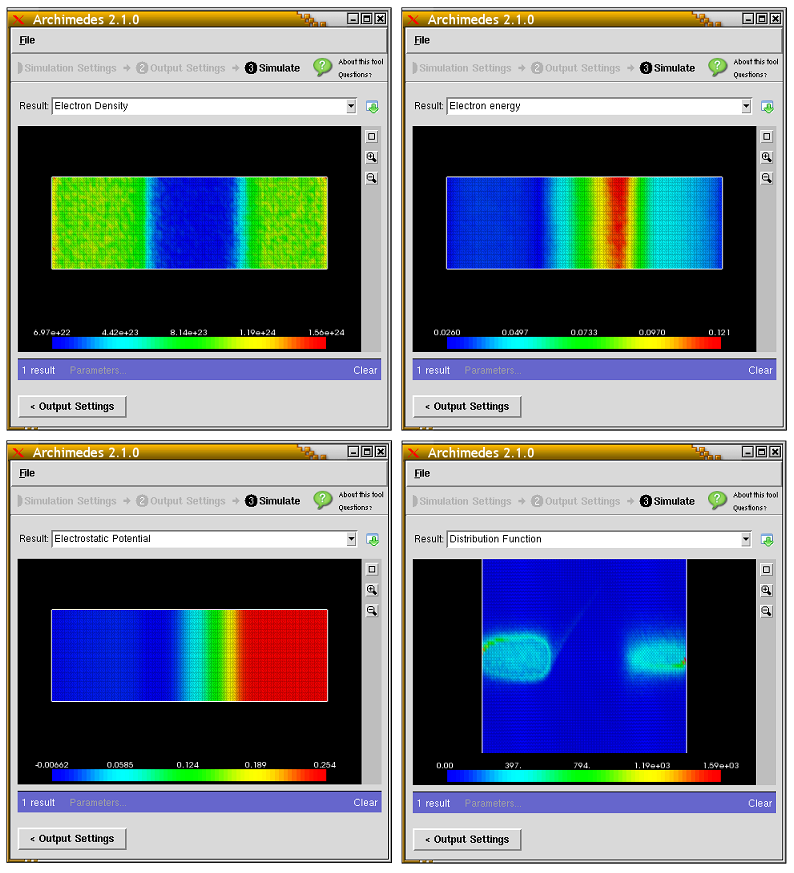
A simple 2D diode simulation using Archimedes. The diode is a simple n+-n-n+ structure, the channel length being equal to 0.4 micron. The diode has two n+ regions of 0.3 micron (i.e. the total length is 1.0 micron ). The density in the doping regions are n+=1.e23/m^3 and n=1.e21/m^3 respectively. The applied voltage is equal to 2.0 Volts.

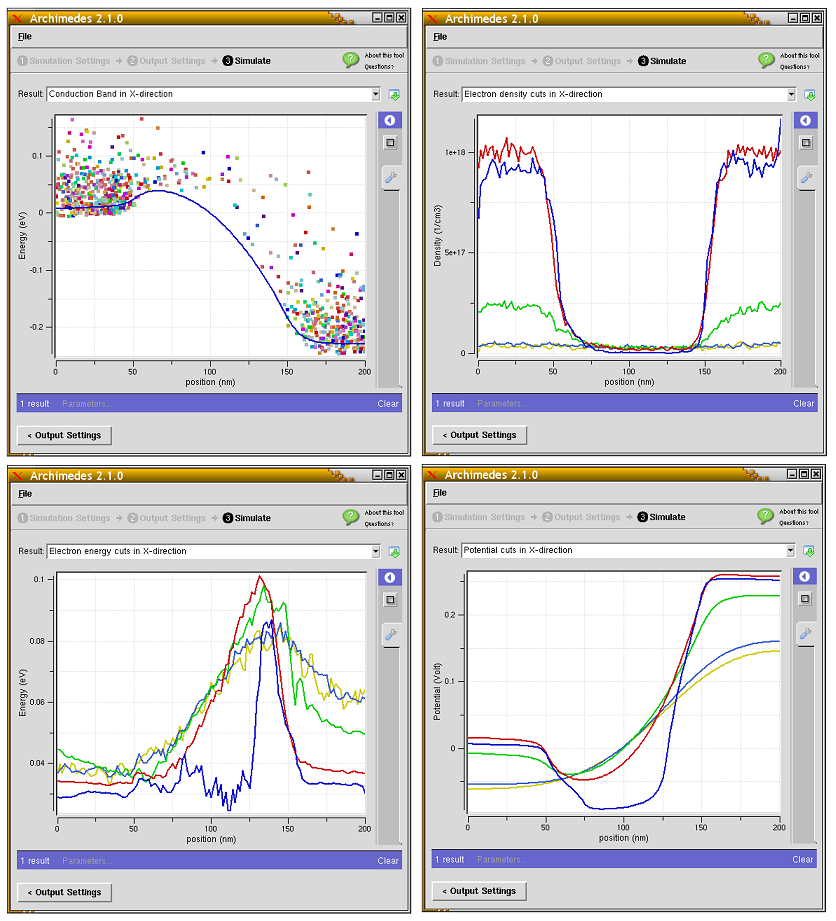
A 2D Silicon MESFET simulation using Archimedes. Archimedes takes into account all the relevant scattering mechanisms.
