= Archimedes (CAD) =

Computer-aided design program

Archimedes - The Open CAD

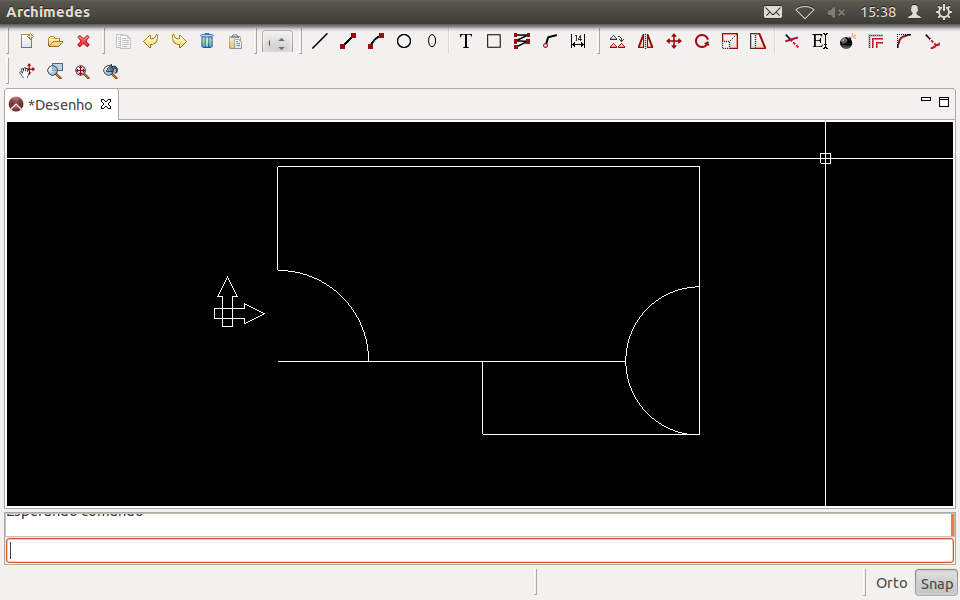
- Archimedes User Interface
- Developers: Archimedes Project, University of São Paulo
- Stable release: 0.67.0 / July 4, 2012; 13 years ago
- Repository: github.com/ArchimedesCAD/Archimedes
- Operating system: Linux, Windows, Mac OS and any platforms supporting Java and OpenGL.
- Platform: Java
- Type: Architectural computer-aided design
- License: Eclipse Public License
- Website: archimedescad.github.io/Archimedes/

Archimedes – "The Open CAD" – (also called Arquimedes) is a computer-aided design (CAD) program developed with direct input from architects and architecture firms. The program was made to create software more compatible with architectural design than the currently widely used AutoCAD, and other available CAD software. The program is free software released under the Eclipse Public License.

== Features ==
- Basic drawing
  - Lines, Polylines, Arcs and Circles.
  - Editable Text
  - Explore
  - Offset
- Advanced CAD functions
  - Trimming
  - Filleting
  - Area measurement
- Miscellaneous
  - Autosave
  - SVG export
  - PDF export
  - English, Portuguese, and Italian language support

=== Integration with other CAD systems ===
Archimedes uses its own XML-based open format, which resembles SVG. It does not yet include support for other CAD formats, but DXF support is planned.

== Development ==
Archimedes is written in Java, and the latest version runs on Windows, Mac OS X, Linux/Unix based systems, and might run on platforms that are supported by LWJGL and a Java Virtual machine on version 1.5.0 or later.

=== History ===
The Archimedes Project started as a collaboration between a group of programmers and architecture students at the University of São Paulo, Brazil, in 2005. The project is currently being developed as free and open-source software. There is a team of students from the university working on it as collaborators, and everyone is free to contribute with plugins and/or patches.

==== Timeline ====
- Archimedes was registered as a SourceForge.net project on July 12, 2005.
- The last stable pre-RCP version was 0.16.0, released on October 25, 2000.
- The first stable version after the RCP migration was 0.50.0, released on April 25, 2007.

=== Migration to Eclipse RCP in version 0.5x ===
A migration to the Eclipse Rich Client Platform in versions 0.5x vastly improved the user interface model and stability, but some functionalities from the last pre-RCP version are still under transfer. Version 0.58.0 aims to move this process a step closer by adding trimming, leader, svg and pdf exporting.
