= SS Archimedes =

First steamship driven by screw propeller

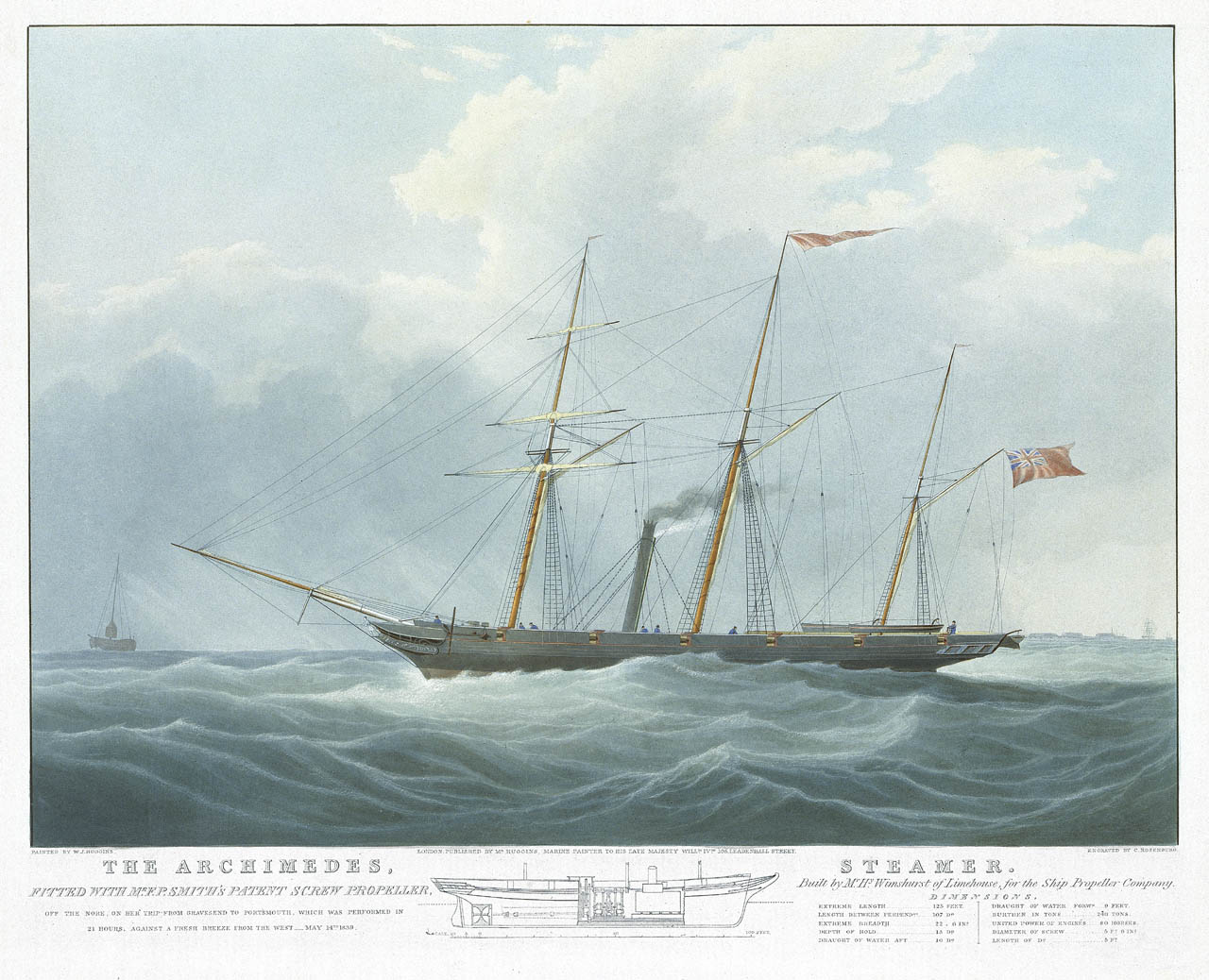
- SS Archimedes

History
- Name: Archimedes
- Namesake: Archimedes of Syracuse
- Owner: Ship Propeller Company
- Builder: Henry Wimshurst (London)
- Cost: £10,500
- Launched: 18 October 1838
- Completed: 1839
- Maiden voyage: 2 May 1839
- In service: 2 May 1839
- Refit: As a sailing ship, date unknown
- Fate: Reportedly ended career in Chile–Australia service, 1850s

General characteristics
- Type: Steam powered schooner
- Tons burthen: 237
- Length: 125 ft (38 m)
- Beam: 22 ft (6.7 m)
- Draught: 8–9 ft (2.4–2.7 m)
- Depth of hold: 13 ft (4.0 m)
- Installed power: 2× 30 hp (22 kW), 25–30 rpm twin-cylinder Rennie vertical steam engines, with 37-inch cylinders and 3-foot stroke
- Propulsion: 1× full helix, single turn, single threaded iron propeller operating at 130–150 rpm, auxiliary sails
- Sail plan: Three-masted, schooner-rigged
- Speed: About 10 mph (16 km/h) (under steam)
- Notes: World's first screw-propelled steamship

SS Archimedes was a steamship built in Britain in 1839. She was the world's first steamship to be driven successfully by a screw propeller. (Note: The emphasis here is on ship. There were a number of successful propeller-driven vessels prior to Archimedes, including Smith's own Francis Smith and Ericsson's Francis B. Ogden and Robert F. Stockton. However, these vessels were boats—designed for service on inland waterways—as opposed to ships, built for seagoing service.) (Note: "The type of screw propeller that now propels the vast majority of boats and ships was patented in 1836, first by the British engineer Francis Pettit Smith, then by the Swedish engineer John Ericsson. Smith used the design in the first successful screw-driven steamship, the Archimedes, which was launched in 1839.") (Note: "The propeller was invented in 1836 by Francis Pettit Smith in Britain and John Ericsson in the United States. It first powered a seagoing ship, appropriately called the Archimedes, in 1839.") (Note: "In 1839, the Messrs. Rennie constructed the engines, machinery and propeller, for the celebrated Archimedes, from which may be said to date the introduction of the screw system of propulsion ...") (Note: It was not until 1839 that the principle of propelling steamships by a screw blade was fairly brought before the world, and for this we are indebted, as almost every adult will remember, to Mr. F. P. Smith of London. He was the man who first made the screw propeller practically useful. Aided by spirited capitalists, he built a large steamer named the "Archimedes", and the results obtained from her at once arrested public attention.")

Archimedes had considerable influence on ship development, encouraging the adoption of screw propulsion by the Royal Navy, in addition to her influence on commercial vessels. She also had a direct influence on the design of another innovative vessel, Isambard Kingdom Brunel's SS Great Britain, then the world's largest ship and the first screw-propelled steamship to cross the Atlantic Ocean.

== Background ==
The principle of moving water with a screw has been known since the invention of the Archimedes' screw, named after Archimedes of Syracuse who lived in the 3rd century BC. It was not until the 18th century however, and the invention of the steam engine, that a practical means of delivering effective power to a marine screw propulsion system became available, but initial attempts to build such a vessel met with failure.

In 1807, the world's first commercially successful steam-powered vessel, Robert Fulton's North River Steamboat, made its debut. As this vessel was powered by paddlewheels rather than a propeller, the paddlewheel thereby became the de facto early standard for steamship propulsion. Experimentation with screw propulsion continued in some quarters, however, and between 1750 and the 1830s numerous patents for marine propellers were taken out by various inventors, though few of these inventions were pursued to the testing stage, and those that were proved unsatisfactory for one reason or another.

=== Ericsson and Smith ===
In 1835, two inventors in Britain, John Ericsson and Francis Pettit Smith, began working separately on the problem. Smith, a farmer by trade who had entertained a lifelong fascination with screw propulsion, was first to take out a screw propeller patent on 31 May, while Ericsson, a gifted Swedish engineer then working in Britain, filed his patent six weeks later.

Smith's original 1836 patent for a screw propeller of two full turns. He would later revise the patent, reducing the length to one turn.

Smith quickly built a small model boat to test his invention, which was demonstrated first on a pond at his Hendon farm, and later at the Royal Adelaide Gallery of Practical Science in London, where it was seen by the Second Secretary of the Admiralty, Sir John Barrow. Having secured the patronage of a London banker named Wright, Smith then built a 30-foot (9.1 m), 6-horsepower (4.5 kW) canal boat of six tons burthen called Francis Smith, which was fitted with a wooden propeller of his own design and demonstrated on the Paddington Canal from November 1836 to September 1837. By a fortuitous accident, the wooden propeller of two turns was damaged during a voyage in February 1837, and to Smith's surprise the broken propeller, which now consisted of only a single turn, doubled the boat's previous speed, from about four miles per hour (6.4 km/h) to eight miles per hour (13 km/h). Smith would subsequently file a revised patent in keeping with this accidental discovery.

In the meantime, Ericsson was conducting his own experiments. In 1837, he built a 45-foot (14 m) screw propelled steamboat, Francis B. Ogden, named after his patron, the American consul to Liverpool. In the summer of 1837, Ericsson demonstrated his boat on the River Thames to senior members of the British Admiralty, including Surveyor of the Navy Sir William Symonds. In spite of the boat achieving a speed of ten miles per hour (16 km/h), comparable with that of existing paddle steamers, Symonds and his entourage were unimpressed. The Admiralty maintained the view that screw propulsion would be ineffective in ocean-going service, while Symonds himself believed that screw propelled ships could not be steered efficiently. (Note: In the case of Francis B. Ogden, Symonds was correct. Ericsson had made the mistake of placing the rudder forward of the propellers, which made the rudder ineffective. Symonds believed that Ericsson tried to disguise the problem by towing a barge during the test.) Following this rejection, Ericsson built a second, larger screw-propelled boat, Robert F. Stockton, and had her sailed in 1839 to the United States, where he was soon to gain fame as the designer of the U.S. Navy's first screw-propelled warship, USS Princeton.

Apparently aware of the Navy's view that screw propellers would prove unsuitable for seagoing service, Smith determined to prove this assumption wrong. In September 1837, he took his small vessel (now fitted with an iron propeller of a single turn) to sea, steaming from Blackwall, London to Hythe, Kent, with stops at Ramsgate, Dover and Folkestone. On the way back to London on the 25th, Smith's craft was observed making headway in stormy seas by officers of the Royal Navy. The Admiralty's interest in the technology was revived, and Smith was encouraged to build a full size ship to more conclusively demonstrate the technology's effectiveness. He was able to attract a number of investors to provide the necessary capital, including the banker Wright and the engineering firm of J. and G. Rennie, who together formed a new company called the Ship Propeller Company. The company's proposed vessel was initially tentatively named Propeller, but the name eventually adopted for the ship was Archimedes, after the 3rd century Greek inventor.

== Design and construction ==
Archimedes was built in London in 1838 by Henry Wimshurst. According to F. P. Smith himself, the ship was constructed of English oak, but a later entry in Lloyd's Register indicates that parts of the keel at least were of Baltic fir. The ship was 125 feet (38 m) long, (Note: Some sources state that the ship was 106 feet (32 m) long; they appear to have mistaken the overall length with the length between perpendiculars.) 22 1/2 feet (6.9 m) wide, and 237 tons cargo carrying capacity. Built to a schooner pattern, with classic hull lines and a slender, raking funnel and masts, she was considered by contemporaries to be a beautiful vessel.

=== Machinery ===
Smith's revised 1836 patent. This is the propeller design originally fitted to Archimedes.

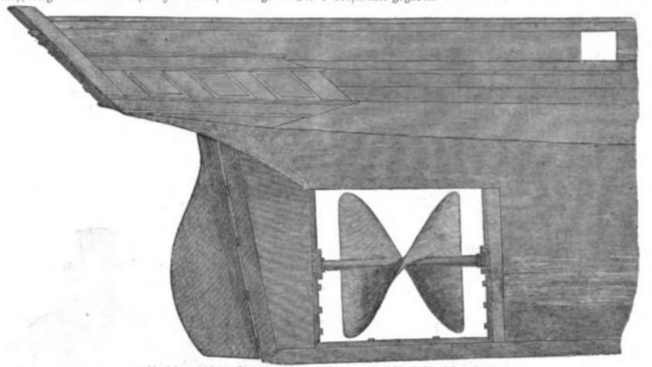
Screw propeller of Archimedes as fitted in the stern of the ship

Smith initially had some difficulty sourcing suitable engines for the ship, as screw propulsion presented some unfamiliar technical challenges. Eventually the leading engineering firm of J. and G. Rennie agreed to design and supply the engines, and the Rennies themselves were persuaded to take a financial interest in the ship and its technology.

The twin engines supplied by the Rennies each had two 37-inch (94 cm) cylinders with a three-foot (0.91 m) stroke, delivering a combined nominal horsepower of about 80, and an actual horsepower of about 60. The engines ran at 26 rpm, which through gearing drove the propeller shaft at about 140 rpm. The boilers operated at a pressure of 6 psi. The engines were installed in early 1839, following the ship's launch in October 1838.

The gearing provided some additional technical problems. Smith geared the engines to the propeller via spur-wheels and pinions, the largest of which was toothed with hornbeam (a white timber traditionally used for gearing in windmills). The gearing arrangement proved to be very noisy, and the ship's stern was subject to considerable vibration in operation. Smith planned to reduce the noise by the use of spiral gears, but it is unclear whether this modification was ever carried out.

The propeller itself was of sheet iron, 5 feet 9 inches (1.75 m) in diameter and about 5 feet (1.5 m) long, and consisted of a full 360° screw, single threaded and of a single turn in keeping with Smith's revised 1836 patent. Following the ship's entry into service, the propeller would subsequently undergo a number of modifications, the most important of which were an alteration to a double threaded/half turn format, and a division of the original 360° screw into two separate blades. The propeller had the unusual feature of being fully retractable in order to reduce drag when the ship was under sail—a task that took about 15 minutes.

== Service history ==
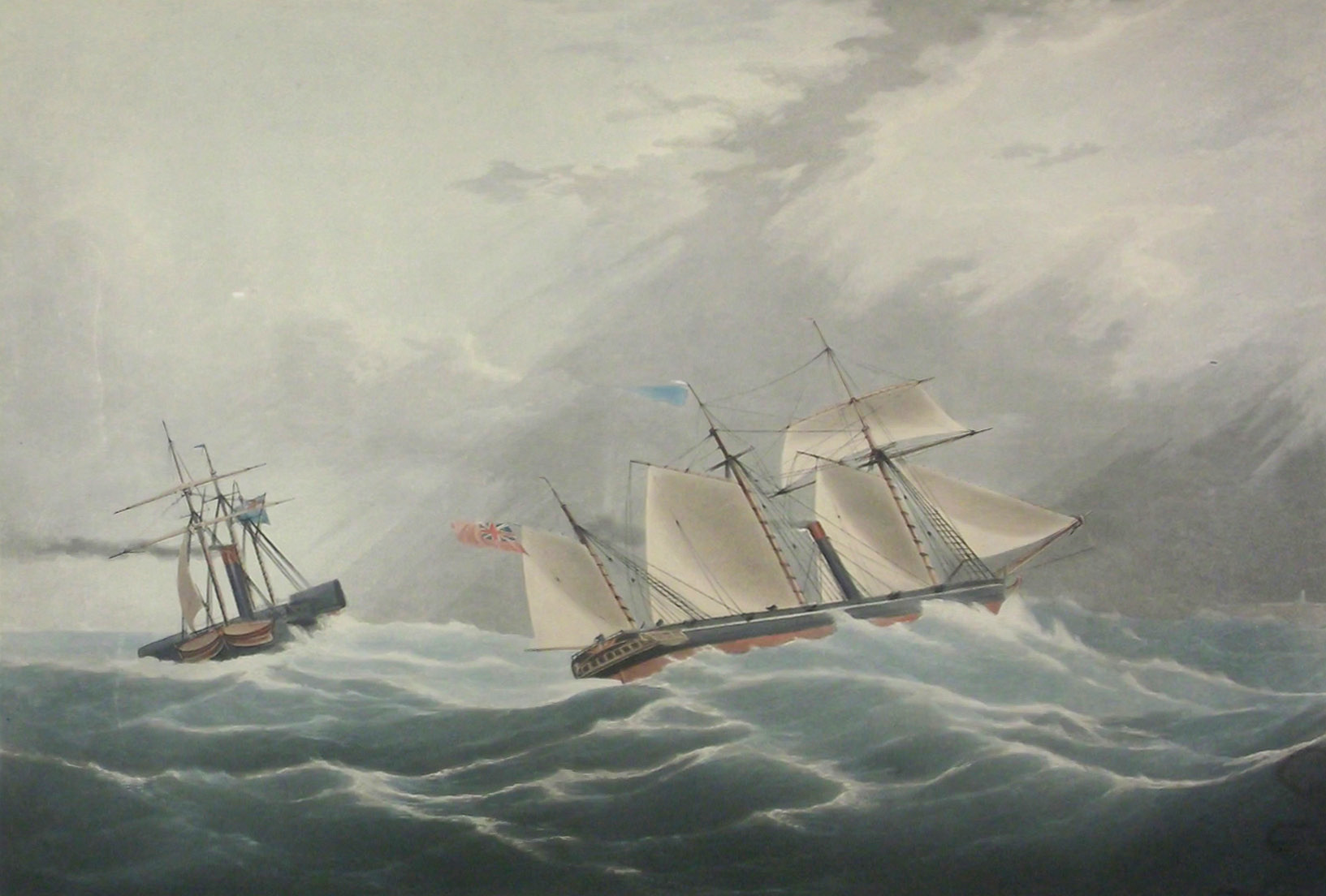
Archimedes under steam and sail at sea. On the left, Vulcan in pursuit of her.

Archimedes made her maiden voyage, from London to Sheerness Approach near the mouth of the Thames, commencing 2 May 1839. On the 15th, she commenced her first sea voyage, from Gravesend to Portsmouth, which was completed at the unexpectedly high speed of 10 knots (19 km/h; 12 mph). At Portsmouth, Archimedes was successfully trialed against one of the swiftest vessels then in Admiralty service, HMRC Vulcan, in the presence of some senior Navy officials, who were impressed by Archimedes' performance.

=== Breakdowns and propeller redesign ===
After this initial trial, Archimedes embarked on a return voyage to London, but while in transit the ship's boiler, which lacked both a gauge and a safety valve, exploded, killing the second engineer and scalding several others. The vessel was then laid up for five months for repairs at Wimshurst's shipyard.

On resuming service, Smith received an invitation from the Dutch government to bring the vessel to the Netherlands for a demonstration, which he accepted. On the voyage to the Texel however, Archimedes broke her crankshaft and was forced to return to England for further repairs, which on this occasion were effected by the firm of Miller, Ravenhill & Co. It was during this refit that the original full helix, single turn, single threaded propeller was replaced by a double-threaded, half turn propeller with two distinct blades. The new propeller had the advantage of considerably reducing the ship's vibration at the stern.

=== Dover trials ===
Following these repairs, the British Admiralty arranged with Smith to undertake a new series of trials for Archimedes at Dover. Captain Edward Chappell, RN, was appointed by the Admiralty to oversee the trials and write a report. From April to May 1840, Archimedes was tested against the Navy's fastest Dover-Calais mail packets, the paddlewheelers Ariel, Beaver, Swallow and Widgeon.

The most telling of these trials were against Widgeon, which was not only the fastest of the mail packets, but also the closest ship in size and horsepower to Archimedes. Widgeon proved to be slightly faster than Archimedes in smooth seas, but Chappell concluded that as the latter had a lower horsepower-to-weight ratio, the screw propeller as a means of propulsion had proven "equal, if not superior, to that of the ordinary paddle-wheel." This finding was more decisive than it may appear, because from a naval perspective, screw propulsion had only to prove itself approximately equal in efficiency to paddlewheel propulsion, as paddlewheels had well recognized shortcomings in military use. These included the exposure of the paddlewheel and its engines to enemy fire, as well as the reduction of space available for the placement of cannon which impinged upon a warship's broadside firepower. Chappell's report would later lead to the adoption of screw propulsion by the Navy (see Legacy section below).

=== Circumnavigation of Britain and other voyages ===
Following the conclusion of the Dover trials, Archimedes was assigned to Captain Chappell for a voyage around Britain, commencing in July 1840. This journey provided an occasion not only to conduct additional tests but also to showcase the technology to shipowners, engineers, and scientists at various ports across the nation. Archimedes completed the 2,006-mile (3,228 km) voyage at an average speed in excess of 7 miles per hour (11 km/h), and a maximum speed under ideal conditions of 10.9 miles per hour (17.5 km/h).

With the completion of this voyage, Archimedes made a passage from Plymouth to Oporto, Portugal in the record time of 68½ hours. The ship subsequently made further voyages to Antwerp, to Amsterdam via the North Holland Canal, and to various other ports on the continent, exciting interest in the new propulsion method everywhere.

=== Loan to Brunel ===
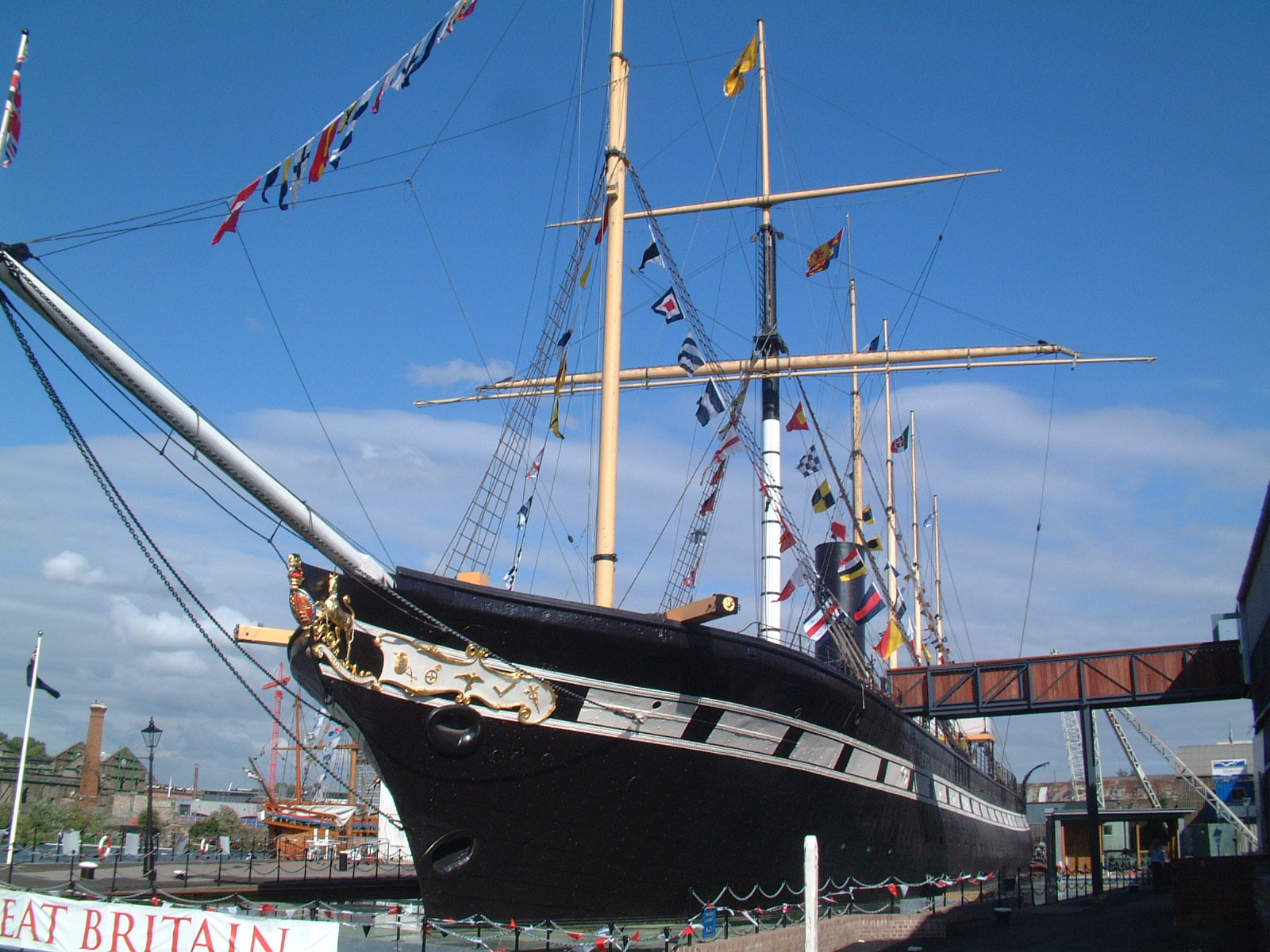
SS Great Britain in dock at Bristol. The ship was fitted with a screw propeller based on trials with Archimedes.

Upon the return of Archimedes to England, Smith agreed to loan Archimedes for several months to the Great Western Steamship Company, which was in the process of constructing the world's largest steamship, SS Great Britain. Great Western's principal engineer, Isambard Kingdom Brunel, took advantage of the loan to test Archimedes with a variety of different propellers in an attempt to find the most efficient design, which was eventually determined to be a new four-bladed model submitted by Smith.

Brunel's experiments led him to recommend to his employers the adoption of screw propulsion for Great Britain. The advantages of screw propulsion listed by Brunel can be summarized as follows:

- Screw propulsion machinery was lighter in weight, thus improving fuel economy;
- Screw propulsion machinery could be kept lower in the hull, reducing the ship's centre of gravity and making it more stable in heavy seas;
- By taking up less room, propeller engines would allow more cargo to be carried;
- Elimination of bulky paddle-boxes would lessen resistance through the water, and also allow the ship to manoeuvre more easily in confined waterways;
- The depth of a paddlewheel is constantly changing, depending on the ship's cargo and the movement of waves, while a propeller stays fully submerged and at full efficiency at all times;
- Screw propulsion machinery was cheaper.

By these arguments, Brunel in December 1840 was able to persuade the Great Western Steamship Company to adopt screw propulsion for Great Britain, thus making her the world's first screw-propelled transatlantic steamer. Instead of using Smith's proven design, however, Brunel later decided to install a six-bladed "windmill" propeller designed by himself. Brunel's design proved to be defective and was quickly replaced with the original design.

=== Later career ===
Smith and his fellow investors had originally hoped to sell Archimedes to the Royal Navy, but when this did not eventuate, the Ship Propeller Company sold the vessel into commercial service. The company, which is estimated to have lost a total of about £50,000 on the Archimedes venture, was subsequently wound up.

The later career of Archimedes is sketchy. The ship ran aground at Beachy Head in 1840. In 1845, she disappeared from Lloyd's Register, but appeared again in 1847 following an overhaul. Her engines and machinery were removed on an unspecified date at Sunderland, after which she continued in service as a sailing ship. In 1850, she was certified as belonging to the Elbe & Humber Steam Navigation Company, trading between Hamburg and Hull. In 1852, her sails and rigging were renewed, but she disappeared from the Register again a year or two later. In early November 1852, there was a fire in her aft hold whilst on a voyage from Hull to Hamburg. She arrived at Hamburg on 9 November with the aft hold flooded. She reportedly ended her career in the 1850s, in service between Chile and Australia. A schooner of that name was wrecked on 27 January 1857 in the Tuamotus, while sailing between Valparaíso and Melbourne.

== Legacy ==
Although the adoption of the screw propeller was an historical inevitability given the work of John Ericsson and others, Archimedes considerably hastened acceptance of the technology. The Dover trials, carried out in April–May 1840, persuaded the Royal Navy to build a 900-ton steam sloop-of-war, HMS Rattler, which was trialled from 1843 to 1845 against HMS Alecto, a sister ship fitted with paddle propulsion. As a result of these trials, the Navy adopted the screw propeller as its preferred propulsion method. By 1855, 174 ships of the Royal Navy had been fitted with screw propulsion, including 52 ships-of-the-line, 23 frigates, 17 corvettes, 55 sloops, and various other vessels.

Some merchants were also quick to adopt screw propulsion. In 1840, Wimshurst built a second propeller-driven vessel, the 300-ton Novelty, the first screw-propelled cargo ship and the first to make a commercial voyage. In 1841, a small passenger steamer fitted with Smith's patented propeller, Princess Royal, was built in the north of England, and in 1842, several more screw-propelled vessels were built or launched in Britain, including Bedlington, built at South Shields, Bee, launched at Chatham, and the largest ship built to that date in Ireland, Great Northern, launched at Derry. From this point, screw-propelled merchant ships grew rapidly in number. By the time the Cunard Line built the paddle steamer Persia for transatlantic service in 1856, the paddlewheel was already becoming an anachronism.

Though Smith's Archimedes had played an important role in the introduction of screw propulsion, Smith himself only lost money on the venture, and was forced to return to farming. He would later be recognized for his contribution however. In 1855, he was amongst five inventors awarded £4,000 each by the House of Commons for invention of the marine propeller. In 1858, a group of patrons arranged a testimonial dinner at which he was presented with a silver salver, claret-jug and subscription, with an aggregate value of £2,678. In 1860, Smith was appointed Curator of the Patent Office Museum in South Kensington, and in 1871 he received a knighthood.
