= Montes Haemus =

Mountain range on the Moon

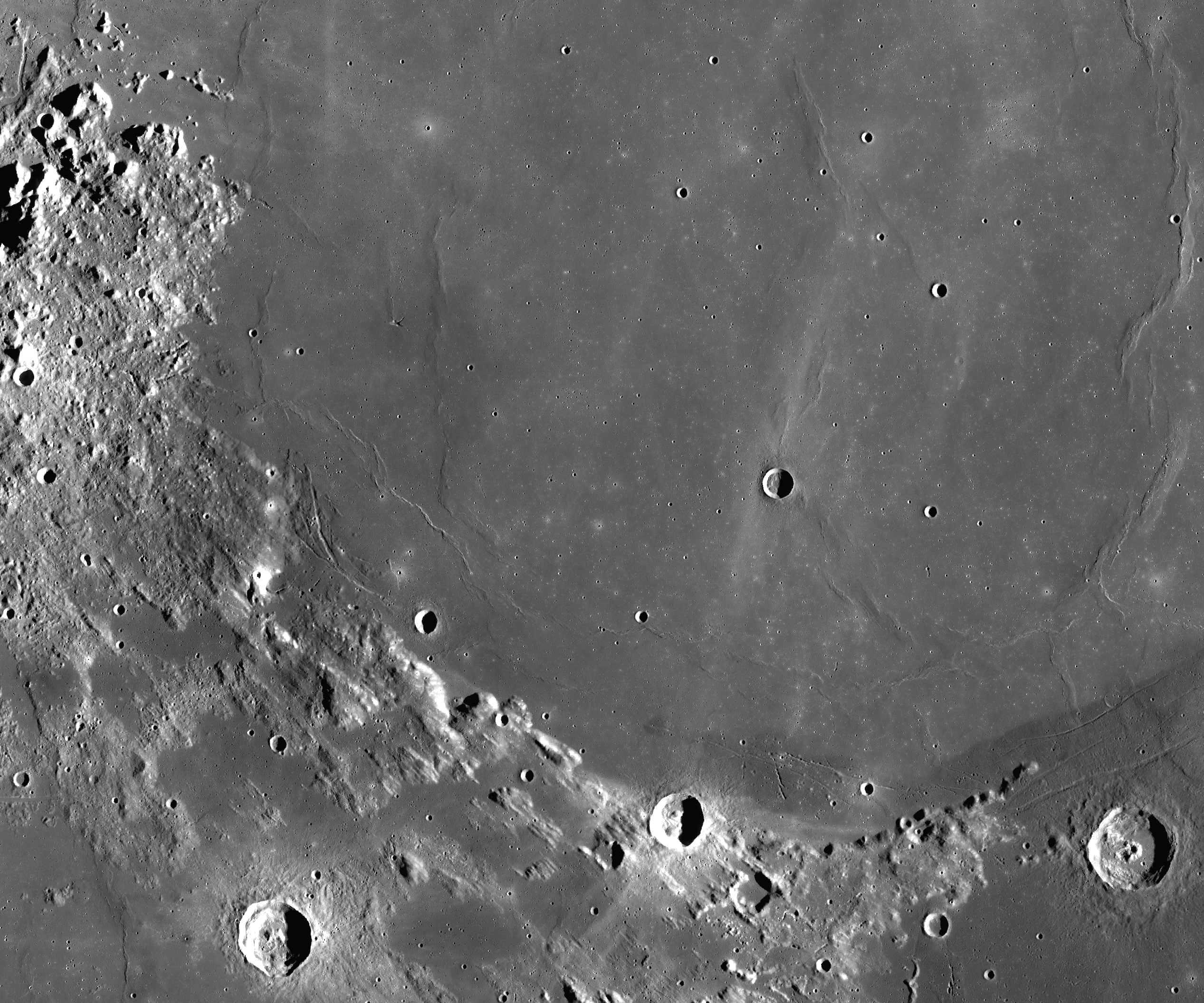
- Montes Haemus. End of Montes Apenninus is seen in upper left and Promontorium Archerusia in lower right. Three biggest craters in the bottom are Manilius, Menelaus and Plinius. Mosaic of photos by LRO, width is 600 km.

Highest point
- Elevation: 2.4 km (1.5 mi)
- Listing: Lunar mountains
- Coordinates: 19.9°N 9.2°E

Geography
- Location: the Moon

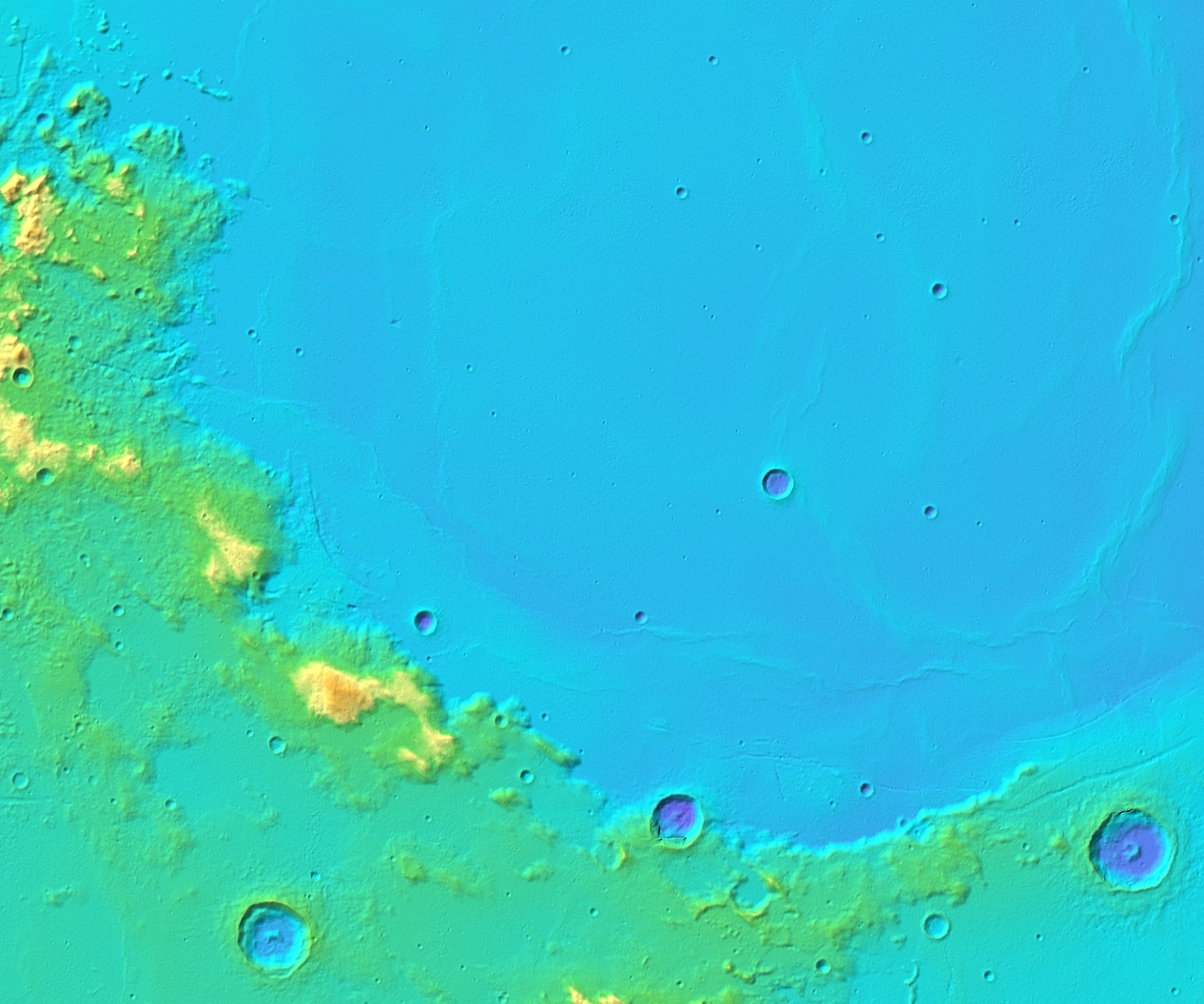
Topographic map of the area (yellow means highlands, and blue means lowlands)

Montes Haemus is a mountain range that forms the southwestern edge of the Mare Serenitatis basin on the Moon. It forms a less prominent mirror image of the Montes Apenninus range to the west, and curves up to nearly join at the northern end. The eastern edge terminates with the Promontorium Archerusia, to the northwest of the crater Plinius. This end reaches a gap where the Mare Serenitatis to the north joins the Mare Tranquillitatis to the south.

The selenographic coordinates of this range are 19.9°N 9.2°E, and the length is 560 km. The tallest peaks in this range climb as high as 2.4 km. The mount spectra shows basaltic material having different content of titanium dioxide, with olivine-rich lithologies.

This range is named after Haemus Mons, an old Thracian name of the Balkan Mountains. It appeared on the map of Moon due to Johannes Hevelius. But he assigned this name (in the form Mons Æmus) to another feature – remains of the rim of crater Alexander, located on the other side of Mare Serenitatis. Later the name moved to the subject of this article. Its modern designation was officially adopted by the International Astronomical Union in 1961. The same name, but with reversed order of words – Haemus Montes – belongs to one of mountain systems on Io.

Several rille systems lie along the eastern side of this range. The eastern end of the range forms the western terminus of a rille system designated Rimae Plinius. 100 km farther to the west the craters Menelaus and Auwers are embedded within the range, and to their northeast are the Rimae Menelaus. Where the mountain range curves up to the northwest, the cup-shaped crater Sulpicius Gallus lies nearby on the lunar mare. Just to the northwest of this crater, and paralleling the mountains, are the Rimae Sulpicius Gallus.

Several small lakes, formed from basaltic lava, lie along the southwest face of the range. From the northwest to the southeast these are Lacus Odii, Lacus Doloris, Lacus Gaudii, and Lacus Hiemalis. The Lacus Lenitatis lies farther to the south.
