= Aratus (crater) =

Crater on the Moon

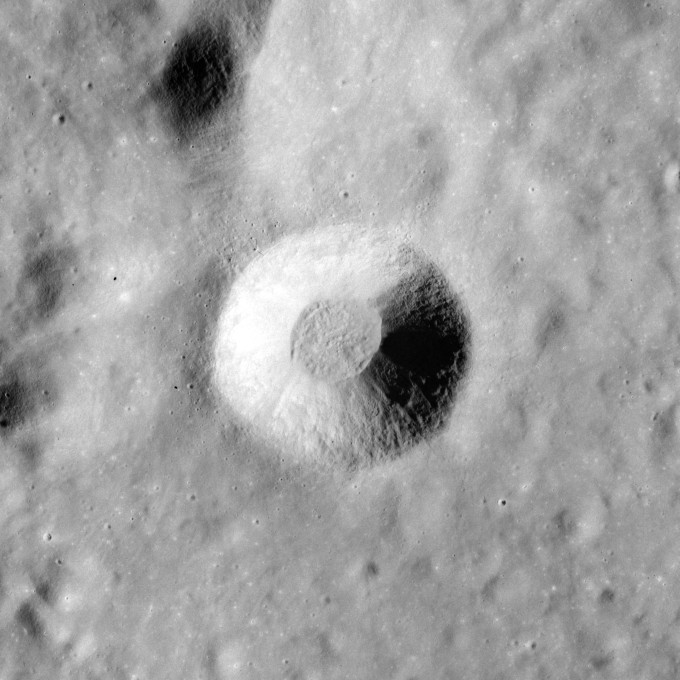
- Apollo 15 mapping camera image
- Coordinates: 23.6°N 4.5°E
- Diameter: 10.6 km (6.6 mi)
- Depth: 1.88 km (1.17 mi)
- Colongitude: 356° at sunrise
- Eponym: Aratus of Soli

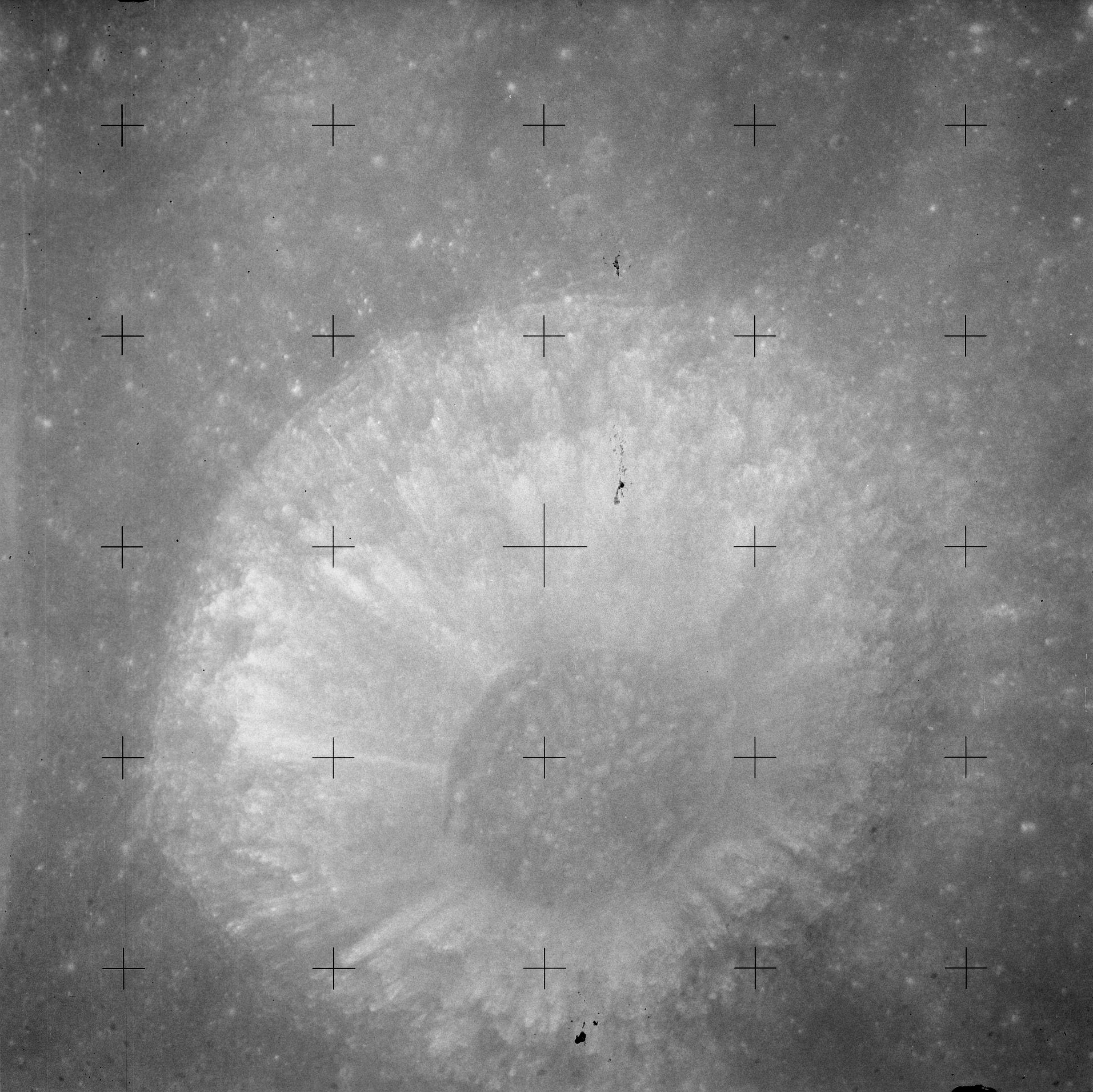
Oblique close-up from Apollo 15. NASA photo.

Aratus is a small lunar impact crater located on the highland to the south and east of the rugged Montes Apenninus range. It is a circular, cup-shaped crater with a relatively high albedo. To the east is the Mare Serenitatis, and to the southwest is the somewhat larger crater Conon. North-northeast of Aratus is the landing site of the Apollo 15 mission, just beyond Mons Hadley Delta.

This crater was named after Greek astronomer Aratus of Soli (c. 310-240/239 B.C.). It was formally adopted by the International Astronomical Union in 1935. The name was added to lunar nomenclature by Giovanni Riccioli in 1651.

During full moon, the high albedo inner slopes of bowl-shaped crater Aratus are an easy target for telescopic observers of the region between the Apennine mountains and the Haemus mountains. The remarkable brightness of Aratus is also noticeable on the photographic version of chart LAC 41 (page 82) in The Clementine Atlas of the Moon (Ben Bussey / Paul D. Spudis).

== Satellite craters ==
By convention these features are identified on lunar maps by placing the letter on the side of the crater midpoint that is closest to Aratus.

Aratus	Latitude	Longitude	Diameter
B	24.2° N	5.4° E	7 km (4.3 mi)
C	24.1° N	9.5° E	4 km (2.5 mi)
Ca	24.5° N	11.2° E	7 km (4.3 mi)
D	24.3° N	8.6° E	4 km (2.5 mi)

The following crater has been renamed by the IAU.

- Aratus A—See Galen (crater).
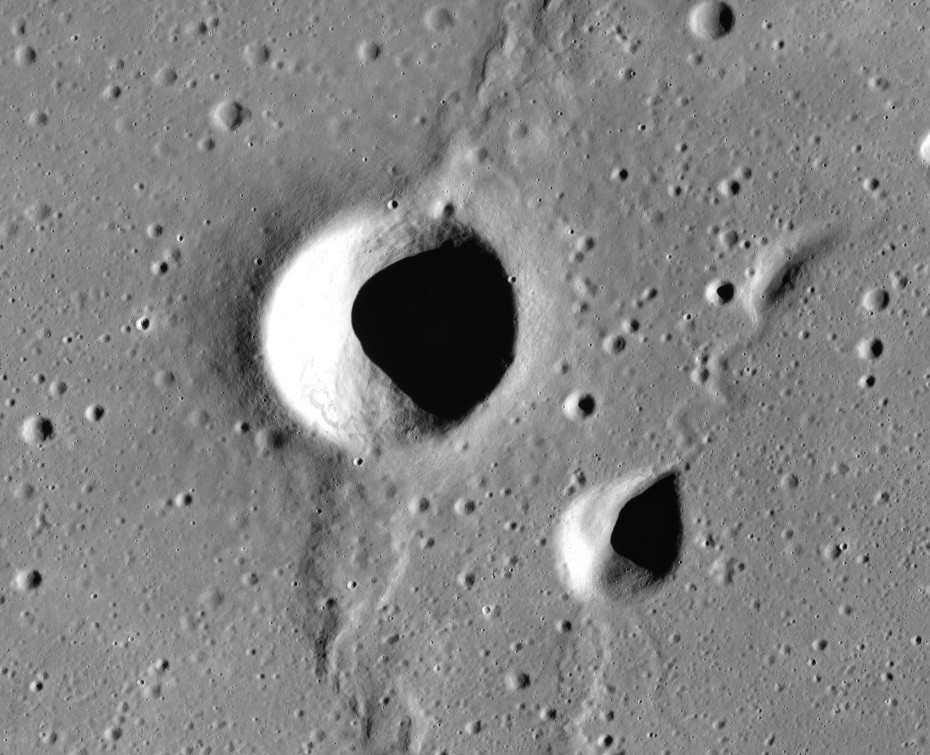
Aratus D (center) and probable collapse features to the east, associated with a small rille (arrows)

== Aratus CA ==
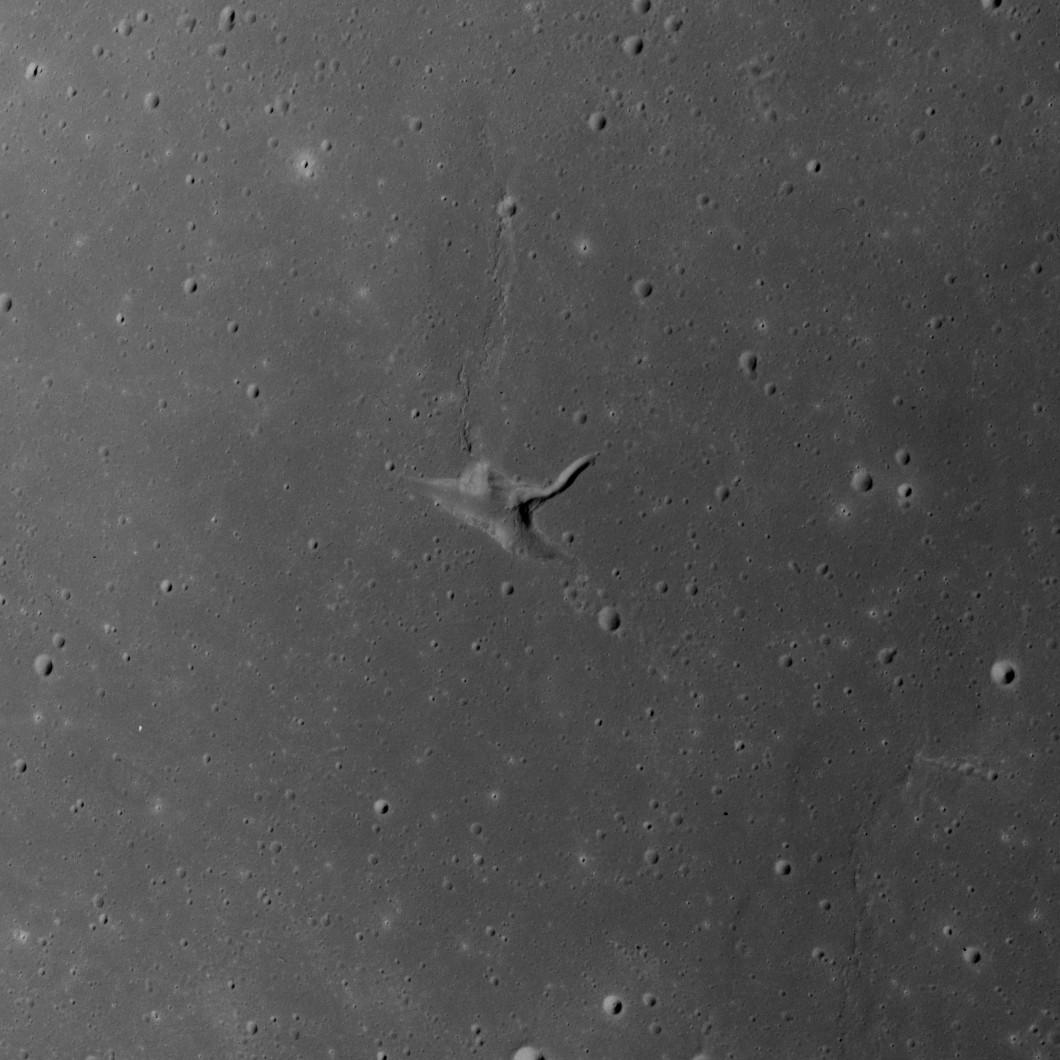
View of Aratus CA and surroundings from Apollo 15. The rift near the midpoint is at selenographic coordinates 24.5° N, 11.2° E, and occupies a diameter of about 9 km (5.6 mi)

This three-pronged feature is located in western Mare Serenitatis. It is formed from a merged group of depressions in the lunar surface, and may be a volcanic vent. The dimensions are 9.5 km × 3 km (5.9 mi × 1.9 mi) with an estimated 0.4 km (0.25 mi) depth.

The three elongated depressions have been given individual names:

Feature	Coordinates	Length	Name source
Rima Sung-Mei	24.6°N 11.3°E	4 km (2.5 mi)	Chinese masculine name
Vallis Christel	24.5°N 11.0°E	2 km (1.2 mi)	German feminine name
Vallis Krishna	24.5°N 11.3°E	3 km (1.9 mi)	Indian masculine name

Two small craters in the vicinity of Aratus CA have also been assigned names:

Crater	Coordinates	Diameter	Name source
Manuel	24.5°N 11.3°E	0.5 km (0.31 mi)	Spanish masculine name
Yoshi	24.6°N 11.0°E	1 km (0.62 mi)	Japanese masculine name

Manuel is just beyond the eastern tip of Vallis Krishna, while Yoshi is just beyond the western tip of Vallis Christel. Manuel is very difficult to see, even on high-resolution photos.

The five names listed above first appeared on the Defense Mapping Agency's Topophotomaps 42A4/S1 and 42A4/S2 and were approved by the IAU in 1976. Because of a ban on the use of lettered crater names that was in effect at the time those maps were prepared, Aratus CA was given the provisional new name Lorca. The name Lorca was never approved by the IAU, despite notations to the contrary on Defense Mapping Agency maps LM-41 and LM-42, and the former name Aratus CA (which had first appeared on LAC-42, published in 1965 ) was officially re-adopted by the IAU in 2006.

Trending to the north from Aratus CA is a wrinkle ridge in the surface that has been designated Dorsum Owen. To the east is a longer, parallel wrinkle-ridge named Dorsum von Cotta. Further to the north-northeast is Linné, surrounded by a bright skirt of high-albedo material. About the same distance to the southwest is the Montes Haemus mountain range at the edge of the lunar mare.

The selenographic colongitude of this grouping at dawn is 349°.
