= Auwers =

Auwers may refer to:

- Auwers synthesis chemical synthesis discovered by Karl von Auwers
- Auwers (crater), a lunar crater

== People ==
- Karl von Auwers (1863–1939), German chemist
- Arthur Auwers (1838–1915), German astronomer
