= Galen (crater) =

Crater on the Moon

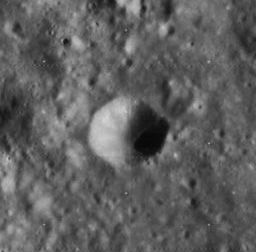
- Lunar Orbiter 4 image
- Coordinates: 21.9°N 5.0°E
- Diameter: 9.18 km (5.70 mi)
- Depth: 1.6 km (0.99 mi)
- Colongitude: 355° at sunrise
- Eponym: Claudius Galen

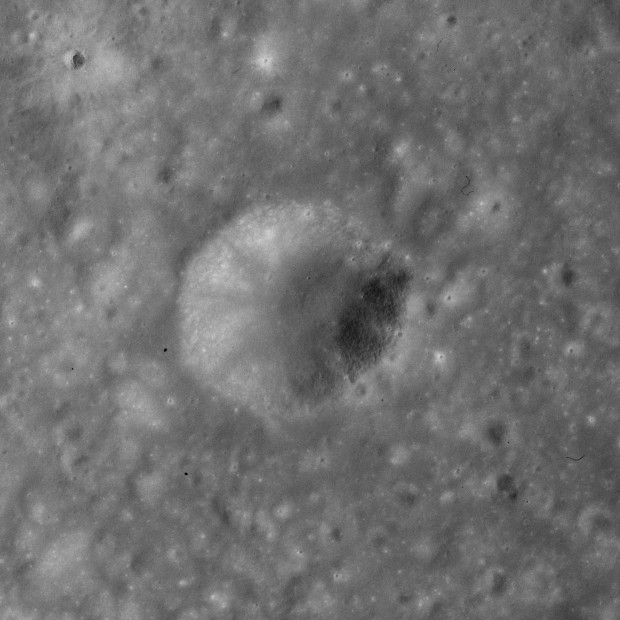
Apollo 15 mapping camera image

Galen is a small lunar impact crater that lies in the rugged region between the Montes Apenninus range to the west and the Montes Haemus in the east. It is located to the south-southeast of the crater Aratus, a slightly larger formation. Further to the west is the crater Conon, near the flanks of the Montes Apeninnus.

Galen is a circular crater with a bowl-shaped interior and a sharp rim that has not undergone significant erosion. The small interior floor has a lower albedo than the surrounding walls.

The crater is named after ancient Greek doctor Claudius Galen (c. 129-200). It was previously identified as Aratus A, before its designation was approved by the IAU in 1973.
