= Daubrée (crater) =

Crater on the Moon

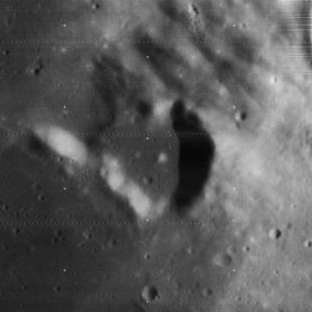
- Lunar Orbiter 4 image
- Coordinates: 15.73°N 14.75°E
- Diameter: 14.67 km (9.12 mi)
- Depth: 1.6 km (0.99 mi)
- Colongitude: 348° at sunrise
- Eponym: Gabriel A. Daubrée

Daubrée is a ruined lunar impact crater that is located to the southwest of the Mare Serenitatis, just to the west-southwest of the crater Menelaus in the Montes Haemus range. The small lunar mare Lacus Hiemalis lies alongside the southwest rim of Daubrée.

This is a horseshoe-shaped formation with the rim open to the northwest. The interior has been flooded by basaltic lava, leaving a level, featureless floor. The rim has a low cut through the southern end, and the eastern rim is attached to low ridges belonging to the Montes Haemus.

This formation was named after French geologist Gabriel A. Daubrée. Its designation was formally adopted by the International Astronomical Union in 1973. Previously, it was designated Menelaus S, a satellite feature of Menelaus crater.

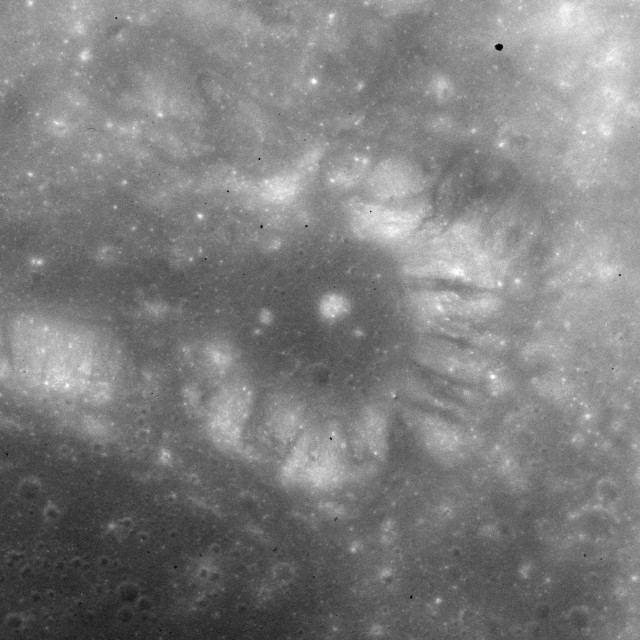
Apollo 15 image

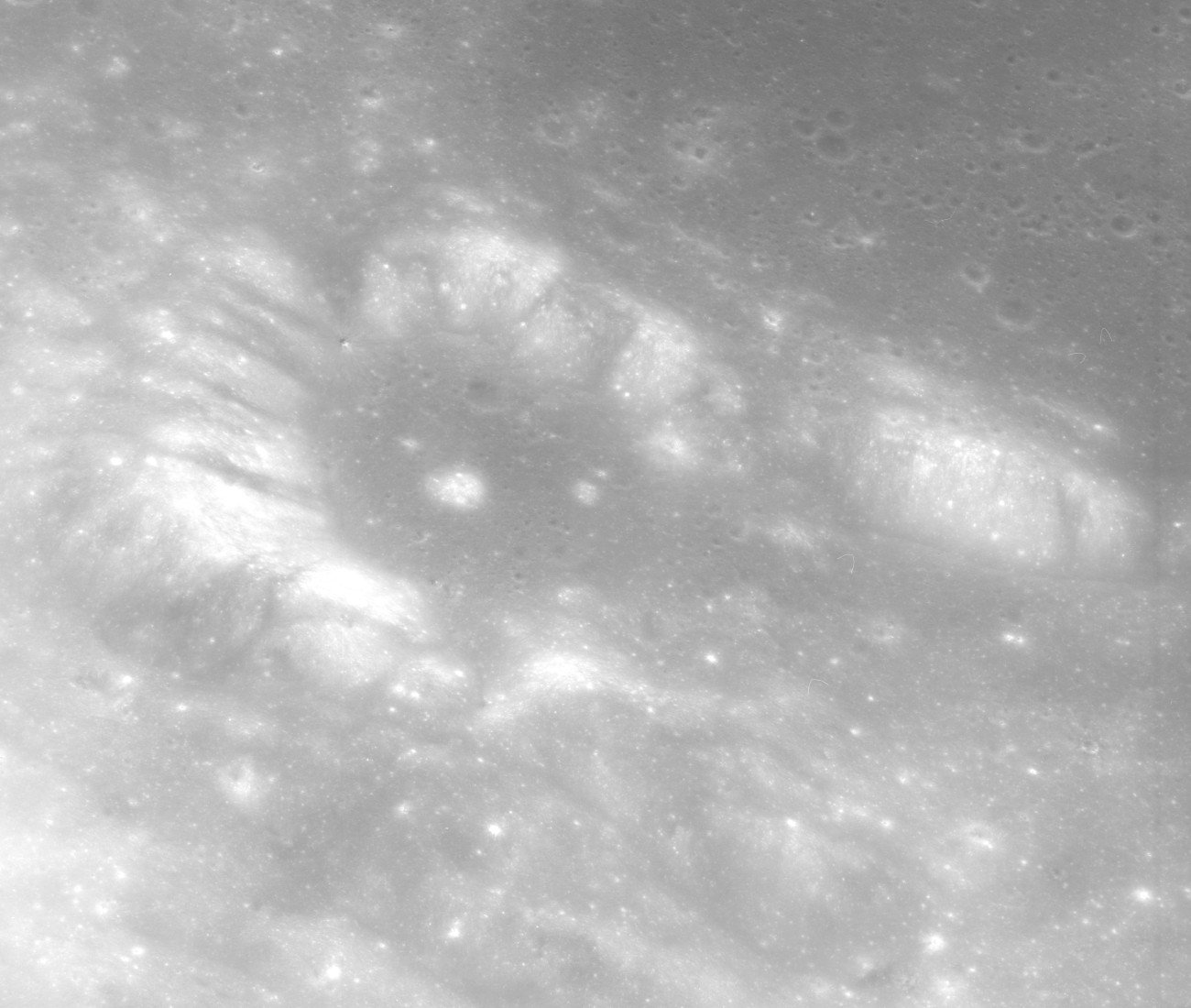
Oblique Apollo 15 image
