= Haemus Mountains =

Haemus Mountains can refer to the following:

- Haemus Mons was an ancient Greek name for the Balkan mountains
- Montes Haemus is a mountain range on the Moon
- Haemus Montes is the name of a ridge on Io, a moon of Jupiter

== See also ==
- List of mountains on the Moon
