= Catalogues of Fundamental Stars =

Astronomical catalogues of stars

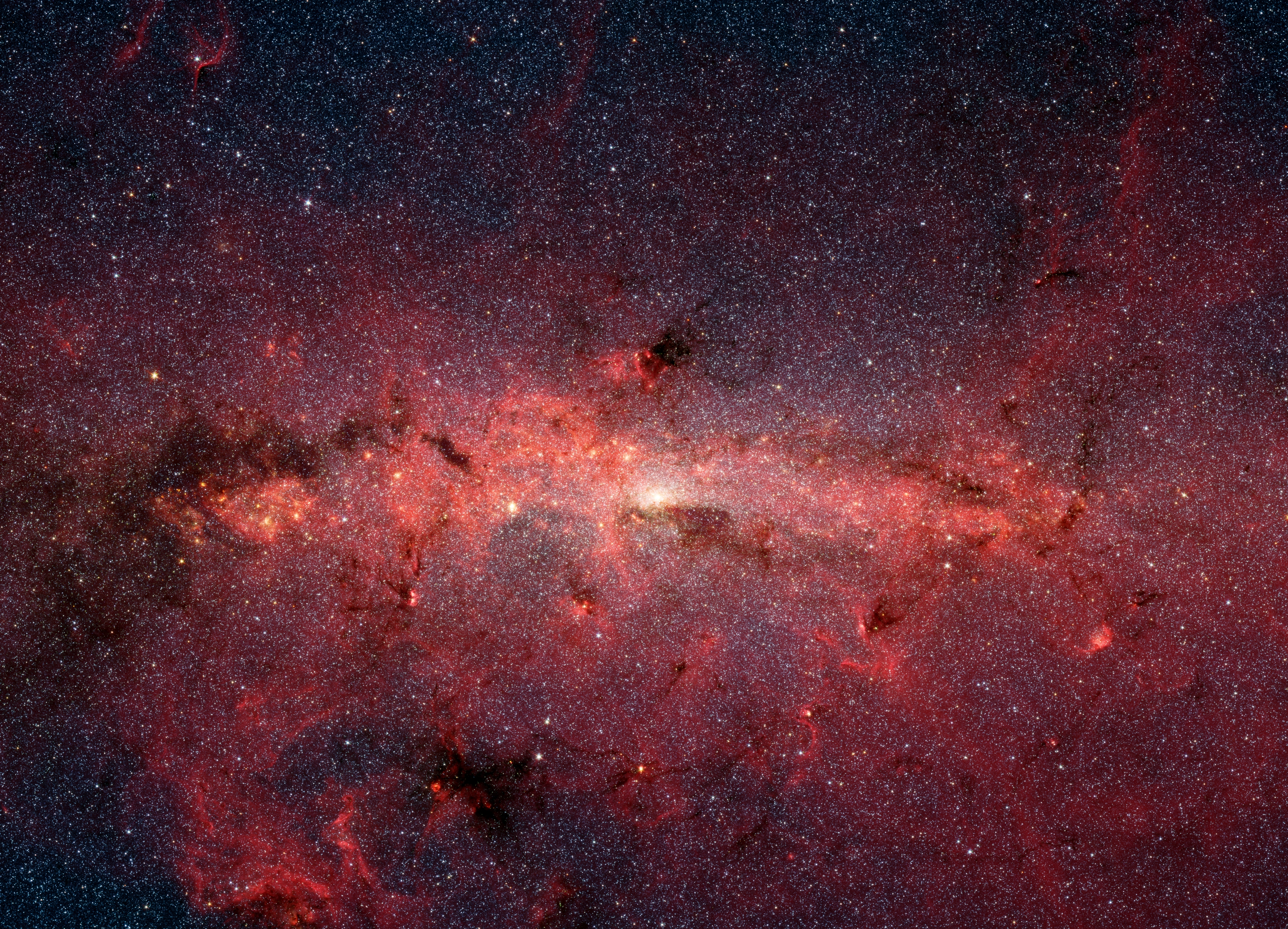
The Spitzer Space Telescope’s infrared cameras revealing stars in the densely populated galactic center region.

The Catalogue of Fundamental Stars is a series of six astrometric catalogues of high precision positional data for a small selection of stars to define a celestial reference frame, which is a standard coordinate system for measuring positions of stars.

== Publication history ==
The six volumes in the fundamental catalogue series are as follows:

The Fundamental-Catalog (FC) was compiled by Auwers and published in two volumes. The first volume, published in 1879, contains 539 stars. The second volume, published in 1883, contains 83 stars from the southern sky.

The Neuer Fundamentalkatalog (NFK) was compiled by J. Peters and contained 925 stars.

The Third Fundamental Catalogue (FK3) was compiled by Kopff and published in 1937, with a supplement in 1938.

The Fourth Fundamental Catalogue (FK4) was published in 1963, and contained 1,535 stars in various equinoxes from 1950.0.

The Fourth Fundamental Catalogue's Supplement (FK4S) was an amendment to FK4 that contains a further 1,987 stars.

The Fifth Fundamental Catalogue (FK5) was a 1988 update of FK4 with new positions for the 1,535 stars. It was superseded by the quasar-based International Celestial Reference Frame (ICRF).

The Fifth Fundamental Catalogue Extension (FK5), published in 1991, added 3,117 new stars.

The Sixth Fundamental Catalogue (FK6) is a 2000 update of FK5 correlated with the ICRF through the Hipparcos satellite. It comes in two parts: FK6(I) and FK6(III). FK6(I) contains 878 stars, and FK6(III) contains 3,272 stars. Both are updated and amended versions of FK5 using Hipparcos Catalogue data.

== Examples ==
- Iota Arietis is located in FK5 as item 2132
- Alpha Arietis is FK5 item 74
- Kappa Aurigae is FK5 item 1168

== See also ==
- Gaia, a star catalogue mission launched in 2013 covering approximately 1 billion astronomical objects
- International Celestial Reference System and Its Realizations, the current IAU approved reference frames in radio and optical wavelengths
