= Terra Nivium =

Highland region on the Moon

Terra Nivium (Latin for "Land of Snows") is a roughly triangular highland region on the Moon. In his Almagestum novum, the notable selenographer Giovanni Riccioli named the various highland regions terrae. However, unlike his naming scheme for craters and lunar maria, his nomenclature for the continental areas of the Moon never came into common use.

It lies to the north of the Mare Vaporum and is bounded along the northwest by the rugged Montes Apenninus range, and to the northeast by the less impressive Montes Haemus mountains. Portions of this area have been penetrated by flows of magma that connect to the Mare Vaporum.

This irregular area contains a number of smaller depressions that have become covered in flows of basaltic lavas. These form what are essentially miniature lunar maria. They are clustered near the southern borders of the area, and fill much of the terrain between Mare Vaporum and the Montes Haemus. These mare-like features are generally irregular in shape, and many are joined through gaps between the more rugged islands of continental terrain.

These areas are listed in the table below, ordered from west to east. The listed diameter corresponds to the smallest circle that fully contains the feature.

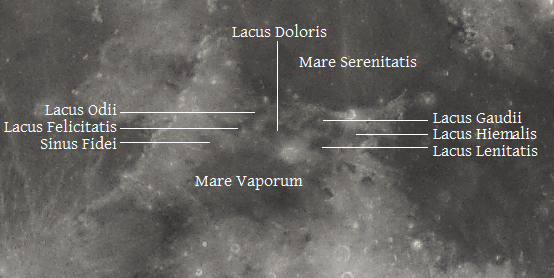
Features of Terra Nivium. The crater close to the centre of the image is Manilius.

Latin Name	Translation	Latitude	Longitude	Diameter
Sinus Fidei	Bay of Faith	18.0° N	2.0° E	70 km
Lacus Felicitatis	Lake of Happiness	19.0° N	5.0° E	90 km
Lacus Odii	Lake of Hate	19.0° N	7.0° E	70 km
Lacus Doloris	Lake of Sorrow	17.1° N	9.0° E	110 km
Lacus Lenitatis	Lake of Tenderness	14.0° N	12.0° E	80 km
Lacus Gaudii	Lake of Delight	16.2° N	12.6° E	113 km
Lacus Hiemalis	Lake of Winter	15.0° N	14.0° E	50 km
