= Mons Bradley =

Mountain on the Moon

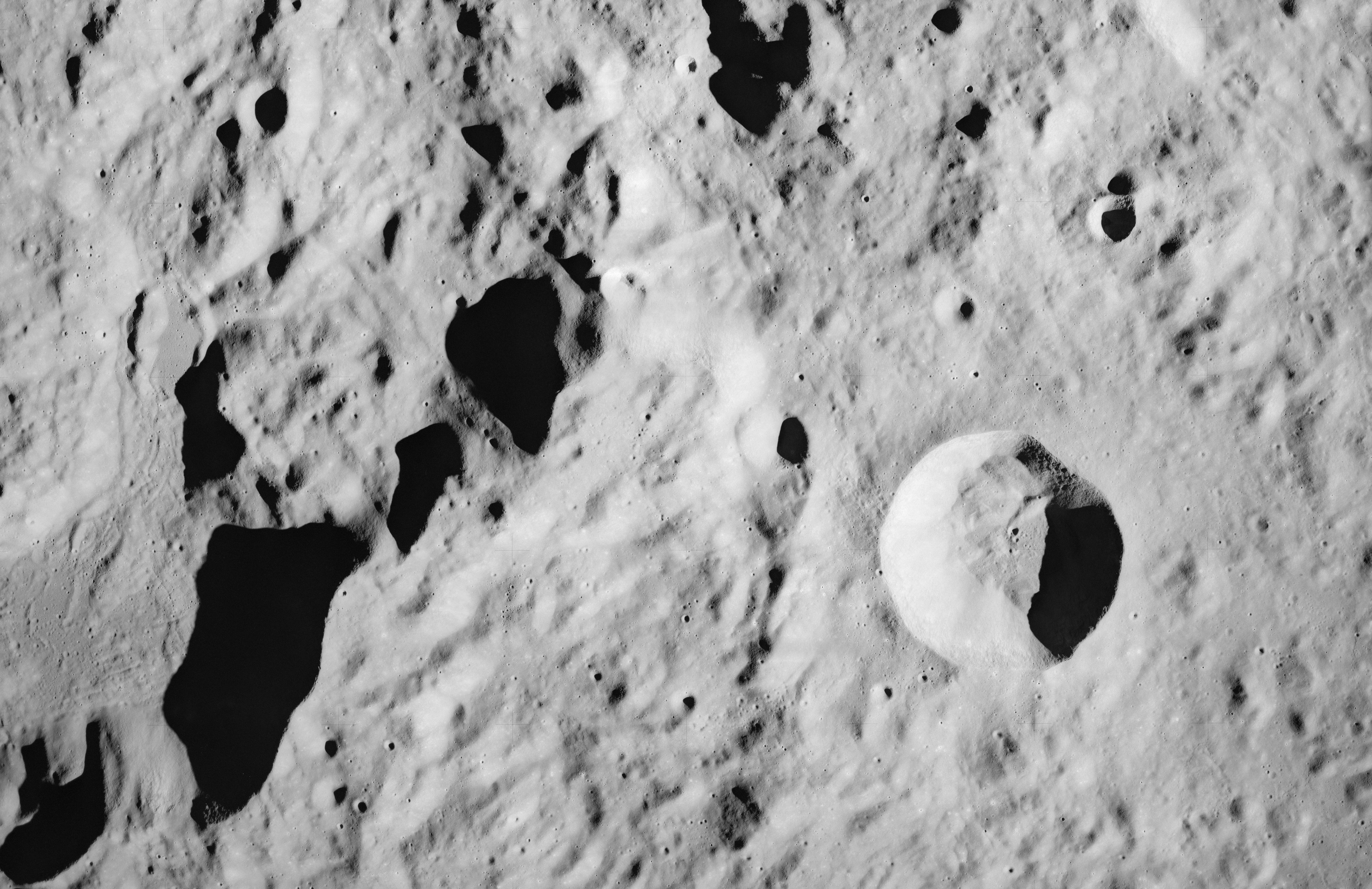
- Mons Bradley is the long ridge in the left half of this photo. To the right is the crater Conon. NASA photo.

Highest point
- Elevation: 4.2 km
- Listing: Lunar mountains
- Coordinates: 21.73°N 0.38°E

Geography
- Location: the Moon

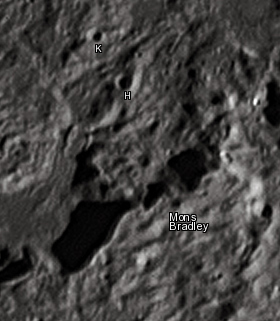
Mons Bradley and its nearby satellite craters taken from Earth in 2012 at the University of Hertfordshire's Bayfordbury Observatory with the telescopes Meade LX200 14" and Lumenera Skynyx 2-1

Mons Bradley is a lunar mountain massif in the Montes Apenninus range, along the eastern edge of the Mare Imbrium. It is located to the west of the crater Conon. To the west of this peak is the Rima Bradley rille. (See below.)

The selenographic coordinates of this peak are 21.73°N 0.38°E. It has a maximum diameter of 30 km across the base, and rises to a height of about 4.2 km. It is named after the English astronomer James Bradley (1692–1762).

== Rima Bradley ==
This is a graben-type rille located in the southeastern part of the Mare Imbrium, near the Montes Apenninus range. To the northwest is the prominent crater Archimedes. This rille follows a course to the southwest, starting at the Palus Putredinis, and cutting through a hummocky region. To the east of the northern end of this rille is Rima Hadley and the landing site of the Apollo 15 mission.

This feature is centered at selenographic coordinates 23.8°N 1.2°W, and it has a maximum diameter of 161 km. The rille was named for the nearby Mons Bradley. Several tiny craters near this rille have been assigned names by the IAU. These are listed in the table below.

Crater	Coordinates	Diameter, km	Name source
Ann	25.11°N 0.05°W	3	Hebrew feminine name
Ian	25.72°N 0.39°W	1	Gaelic masculine name
Kathleen	25.34°N 0.83°W	5	Irish feminine name
Michael	25.05°N 0.21°W	4	English masculine name
Patricia	24.91°N 0.50°W	5	English feminine name

== See also ==
- List of mountains on the Moon
