= Daubréeite =

Rare bismuth oxohalide mineral

General
- Category: Oxide mineral
- Formula: BiO(OH,Cl)
- IMA symbol: Dau
- Strunz classification: 3.DC.25
- Crystal system: Tetragonal
- Crystal class: Ditetragonal dipyramidal (4/mmm); H-M symbol: (4/m 2/m 2/m)
- Space group: P4/nmm
- Unit cell: a = 3.85, c = 7.4 [Å]; Z = 2

Identification
- Color: Creamy-white, grayish, yellowish-brown
- Crystal habit: Compact massive, columnar
- Cleavage: [{001}, perfect
- Tenacity: Very plastic, sectile
- Mohs scale hardness: 2-2.5
- Luster: Greasy, silky
- Diaphaneity: Transparent to translucent
- Specific gravity: 6-6.5
- Optical properties: Uniaxial (-)
- Refractive index: n_{ω} = 2.150 n_{ε} = 1.910
- Birefringence: δ = 0.240

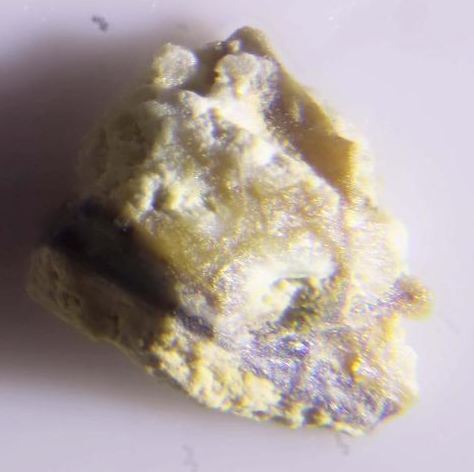

Daubréeite is a rare bismuth oxohalide mineral with formula BiO(OH,Cl). It is a creamy-white to yellow-brown, soft, earthy clay–like mineral which crystallizes in the tetragonal crystal system. It is a member of the matlockite group.

It was first described for an occurrence in the Constanicia mine, Tazna, Bolivia, in 1876. It was named for French mineralogist Gabriel Auguste Daubrée (1814–1896). At the Tanza location it occurs as a secondary mineral formed by the oxidation of native bismuth or bismuthinite. It occurs with clay minerals. In addition to its discovery location it has also been reported from the Tintic District in the East Tintic Mountains of Juab County, Utah; in the Josephine Creek District of Josephine County, Oregon; in the Manhattan District of Nye County, Nevada; and the Rio Marina Mine on Elba, Italy.
