= Conon (crater) =

Lunar impact crater

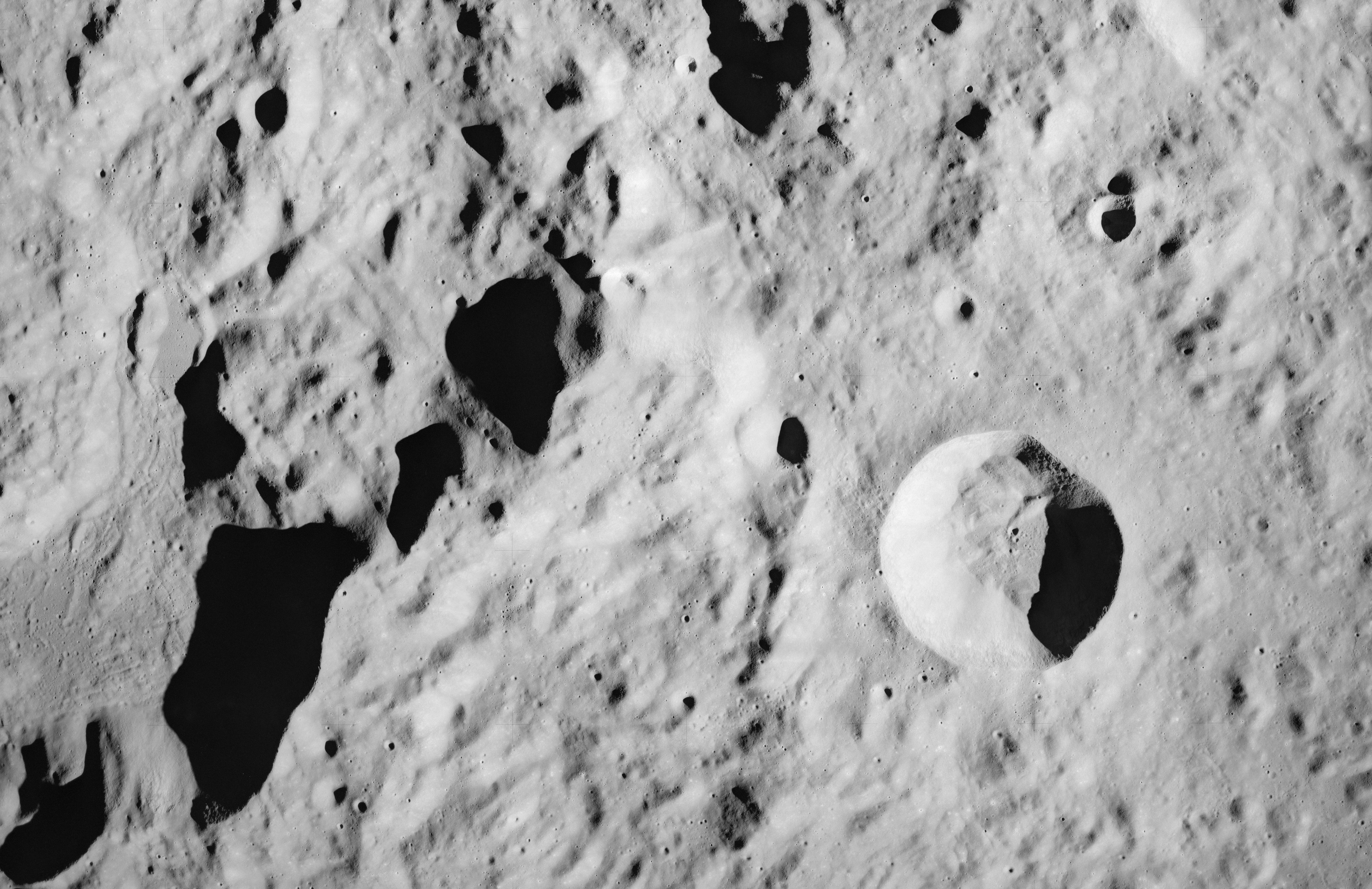
- Conon (right) and Mons Bradley (left) from Apollo 17. NASA photo.
- Coordinates: 21.6°N 2.0°W
- Diameter: 20.96 km (13.02 mi)
- Depth: 2.93 km (1.82 mi)
- Colongitude: 358° at sunrise
- Formation: Copernican
- Eponym: Conon of Samos

Conon is a small but prominent lunar impact crater that lies in the eastern foothills of the Montes Apenninus mountain range. Just to the west of Conon is the long mountainous ridge Mons Bradley. The nearest craters possessing an eponym are Galen, about 70 kilometres (43 mi) to the east, and Aratus, about the same distance to the northeast.

On the lunar geologic timescale, this impact is dated to the Copernican period, so it is relatively young. The edge of Conon's rim is sharply defined and has not received significant erosion from later impacts. The inner wall is somewhat variable in width, and the interior floor forms an irregular oval shape. This irregularity may be due to the rough and uneven surface on which the crater was formed. The floor is rough, but lacks a central prominence of note. One instance of transient lunar phenomenon has been reported for this formation. It shows details that can appear to change position over time, which has suggested it contains clouds.

To the south, in the Sinus Fidei, is a sinuous rille that follows a course to the south-southeast. This rille is designated Rima Conon, and is named after this crater.

This crater is named after the Greek astronomer Conon of Samos (fl. 250 BCE). His name was included in the lunar nomenclature of Italian astronomer Giovanni B. Riccioli in 1651, although he applied it to a bay feature southwest of Mons Bradley. Its designation was formally adopted by the International Astronomical Union in 1935.

== Satellite craters ==
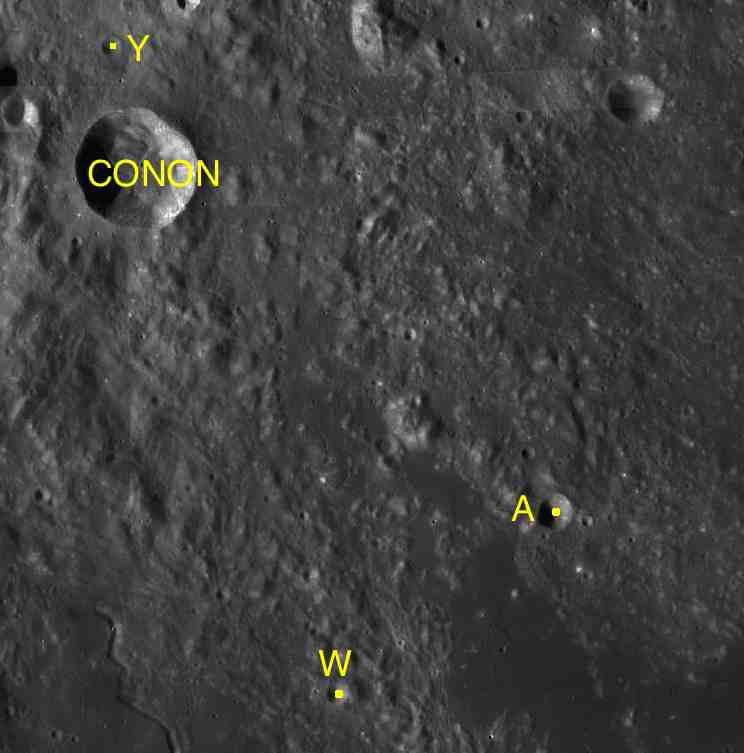
Satellite craters of Conon

By convention these features are identified on lunar maps by placing the letter on the side of the crater midpoint that is closest to Conon.

Conon	Latitude	Longitude	Diameter
A	19.7° N	4.5° E	7 km
W	18.7° N	3.0° E	4 km
Y	22.3° N	1.9° E	4 km

== Gallery ==
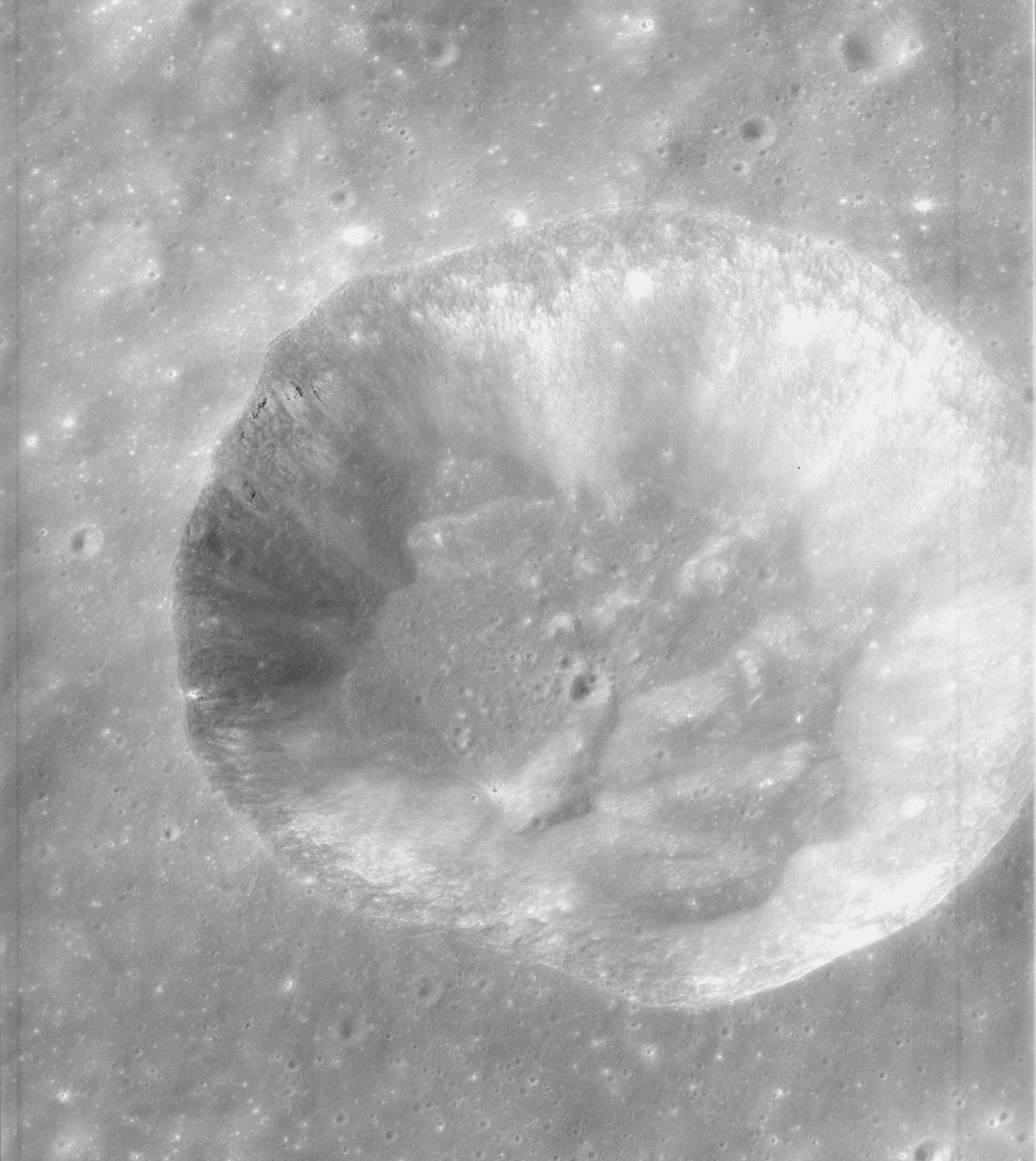
Oblique view of Conon facing south from Apollo 15

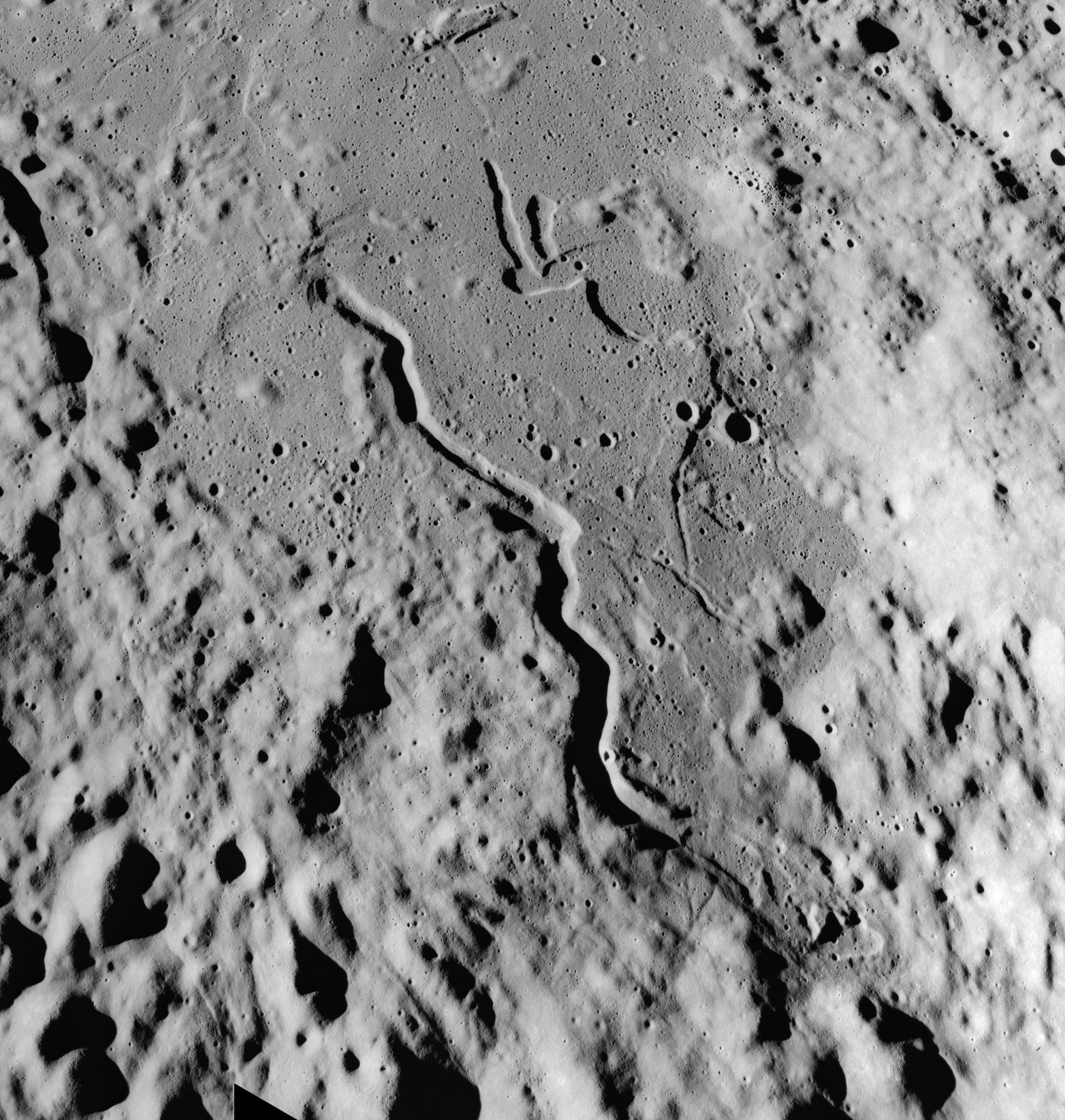
Oblique view of Rima Conon from Apollo 17
