= Iota Arietis =

Binary star system in the constellation Aries

ι Arietis
- Location of ι Arietis (circled)

Observation data Epoch J2000.0 Equinox J2000.0
- Constellation: Aries
- Right ascension: 01^{h} 57^{m} 21.058^{s}
- Declination: +17° 49′ 03.20″
- Apparent magnitude (V): 5.117

Characteristics
- Evolutionary stage: horizontal branch
- Spectral type: K1p or G8III
- U−B color index: +0.700
- B−V color index: +0.921

Astrometry
Radial velocity (R_{v})	2.21±0.07 km/s
Proper motion (μ)	RA: +37.138 mas/yr Dec.: −19.983 mas/yr
Parallax (π)	7.4277±0.2980 mas
Distance	440 ± 20 ly (135 ± 5 pc)
Absolute magnitude (M_{V})	−0.4

Orbit
Period (P)	1,567.66±0.62 d
Semi-major axis (a)	≥ 217 Gm (1.45 AU)
Eccentricity (e)	0.356±0.022
Periastron epoch (T)	2420961.1±27.2 JD
Argument of periastron (ω) (secondary)	94.04±4.72°
Semi-amplitude (K_{1}) (primary)	10.78±0.31 km/s

Details
Mass	3.17^{+0.08}_{−0.09} M_{☉}
Radius	20.4^{+0.7}_{−0.8} R_{☉}
Luminosity	240^{+16}_{−20} L_{☉}
Surface gravity (log g)	2.60 cgs
Temperature	5,031^{+6}_{−2} K
Metallicity [Fe/H]	−0.10 dex
Rotational velocity (v sin i)	3.33 km/s

Other designations
- ι Ari, 8 Arietis, BD+17 289, FK5 2132, GC 2347, HD 11909, HIP 9110, HR 563, SAO 92721, PPM 117816

Database references
SIMBAD	data

Iota Arietis is a binary star system in the northern constellation of Aries. Its name is a Bayer designation that is Latinized from ι Arietis, and abbreviated Iota Ari or ι Ari. This star has an apparent visual magnitude of 5.117; bright enough to be dimly seen with the naked eye. Parallax measurements yield an estimated distance of approximately 440 light-years (130 parsecs) from Earth. The position of this system near the ecliptic means it is subject to lunar occultation.

The variable radial velocity of this system was announced by W. W. Campbell in 1922. K. C. Gordon published orbital elements for this single-lined spectroscopic binary system in 1946, giving an orbital period of 4.29 years and an eccentricity (ovalness) of 0.36.

For the visible component, in 1952 N. G. Roman found a stellar classification of K1p, where the 'p' indicates some type of peculiarity with the spectrum. Her comments indicated that the "Hydrogen lines and λ 4290 are strong enough to indicate a class II star, but the CN is barely strong enough for class III, and the Sr II is not much stronger than this would require.". E. A. Harlan published a class of K peculiar in 1969, commenting, "Hδ strong, Fe I λ4045 is weak for type". In 1990, K. Sato and S. Kuji gave a class of G8III, suggesting this is an aging G-type giant star and questioning its peculiar status. Bayesian inference of the stellar properties indicates this star is on the horizontal branch. The companion is a suspected white dwarf.
