= Plinius (crater) =

Lunar impact crater

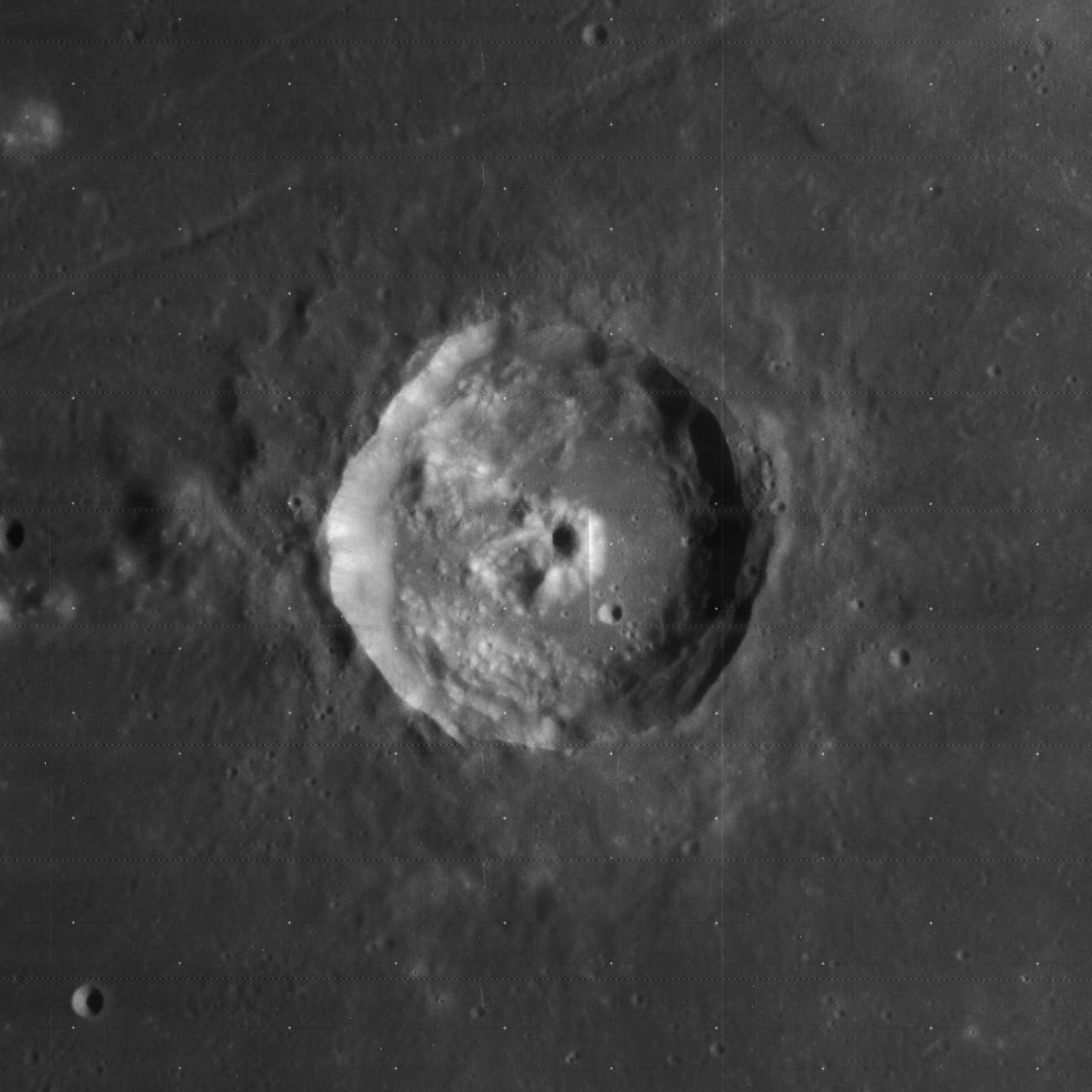
- Lunar Orbiter 4 image
- Coordinates: 15.36°N 23.61°E
- Diameter: 41.31 km (25.67 mi)
- Depth: 3.07 km (1.91 mi)
- Colongitude: 336° at sunrise
- Formation: Eratosthenian
- Eponym: Pliny the Elder

Plinius is a prominent lunar impact crater on the border between Mare Serenitatis to the north and Mare Tranquilitatis to the south. T. W. Webb described it as "a terraced ring" that is "filled with hillocks". Its diameter is 41 km. The crater is named after the Roman natural scientist and author Pliny the Elder. To the south-southeast of Plinius is the crater Ross, and to the northeast is Dawes. Just to the north is a system of rilles named the Rimae Plinius and touching it is the Brackett crater which is more than a crater diameter north. At the northwest edge of the rille is the Promontorium Archerusia, a cape off the western rim that encloses the Mare Serenitatis.

On the lunar geologic timescale, Plinius dates to the Eratosthenian age. The sharp rim of Plinius is slightly oval in form, with a terraced inner wall and an irregular outer rampart. It lacks a visible ray system. The crater floor is hilly, and in the middle is an irregular central peak that has the appearance of a double crater formation under certain angles of illumination. A cleft feature is attached to the northern side of the peak. The eastern half of the floor is much more smooth and level than the hummocky west, and this section forms a crescent shape about the central peak.

== Satellite craters ==
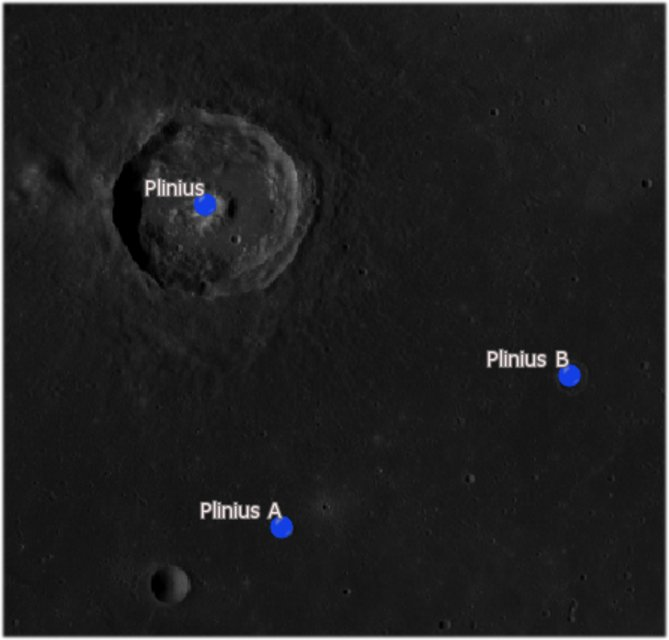
Satellite craters of Plinius

By convention, these features are identified on lunar maps by placing the letter on the side of the crater midpoint that is closest to Plinius.

Plinius	Latitude	Longitude	Diameter
A	13.0° N	24.2° E	4 km
B	14.1° N	26.2° E	5 km

== Gallery ==
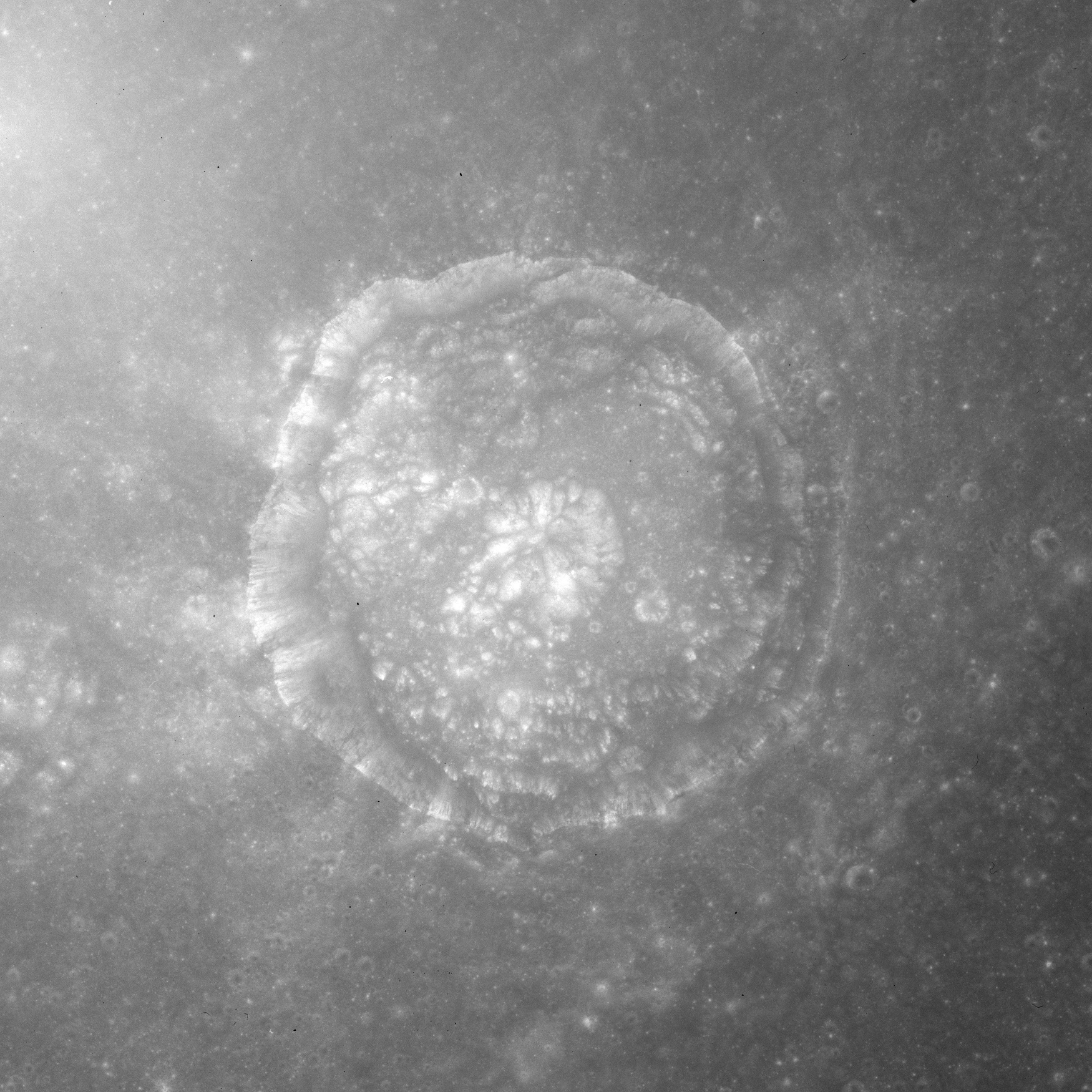
Apollo 15 image at high sun elevation of 71°

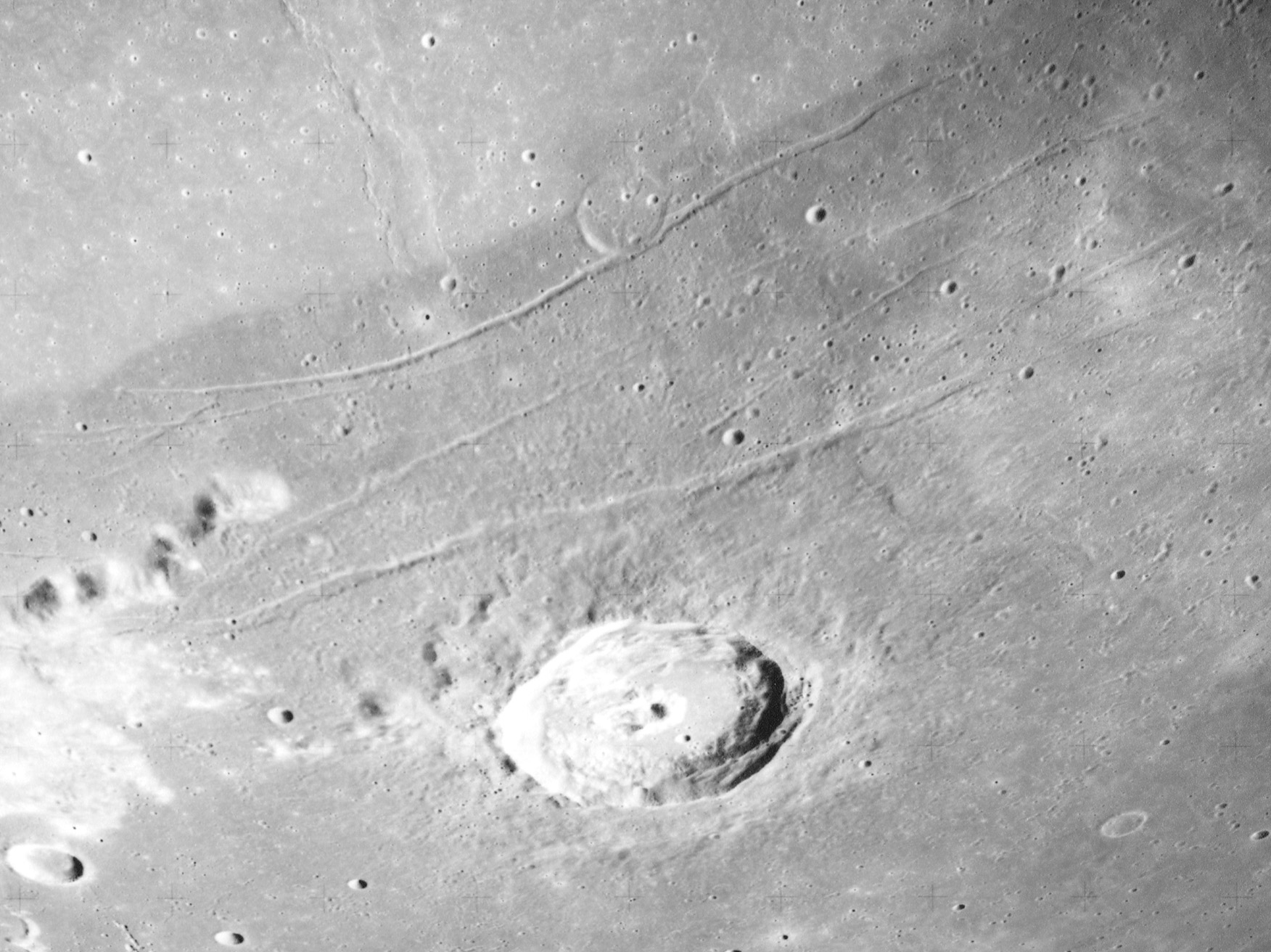
Oblique view from Apollo 17 facing south, and showing both Plinius crater and Plinius Rilles

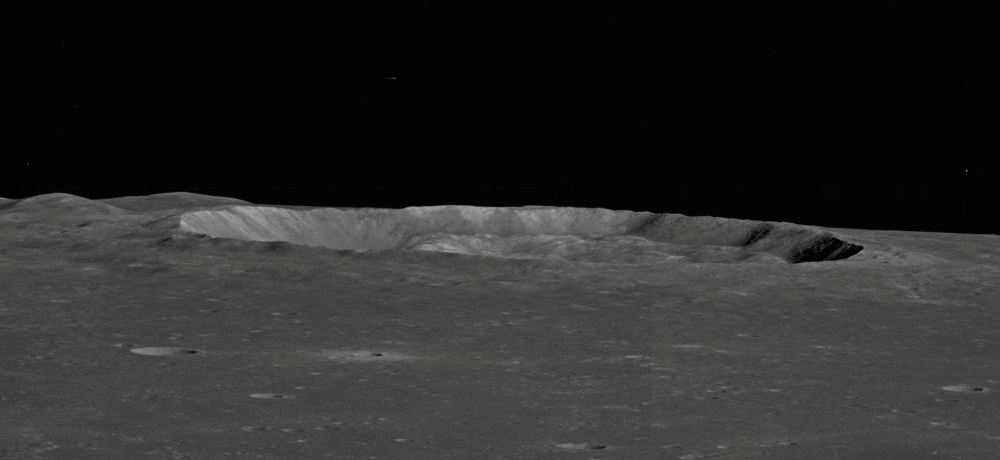
Highly oblique view from Apollo 10, facing northwest

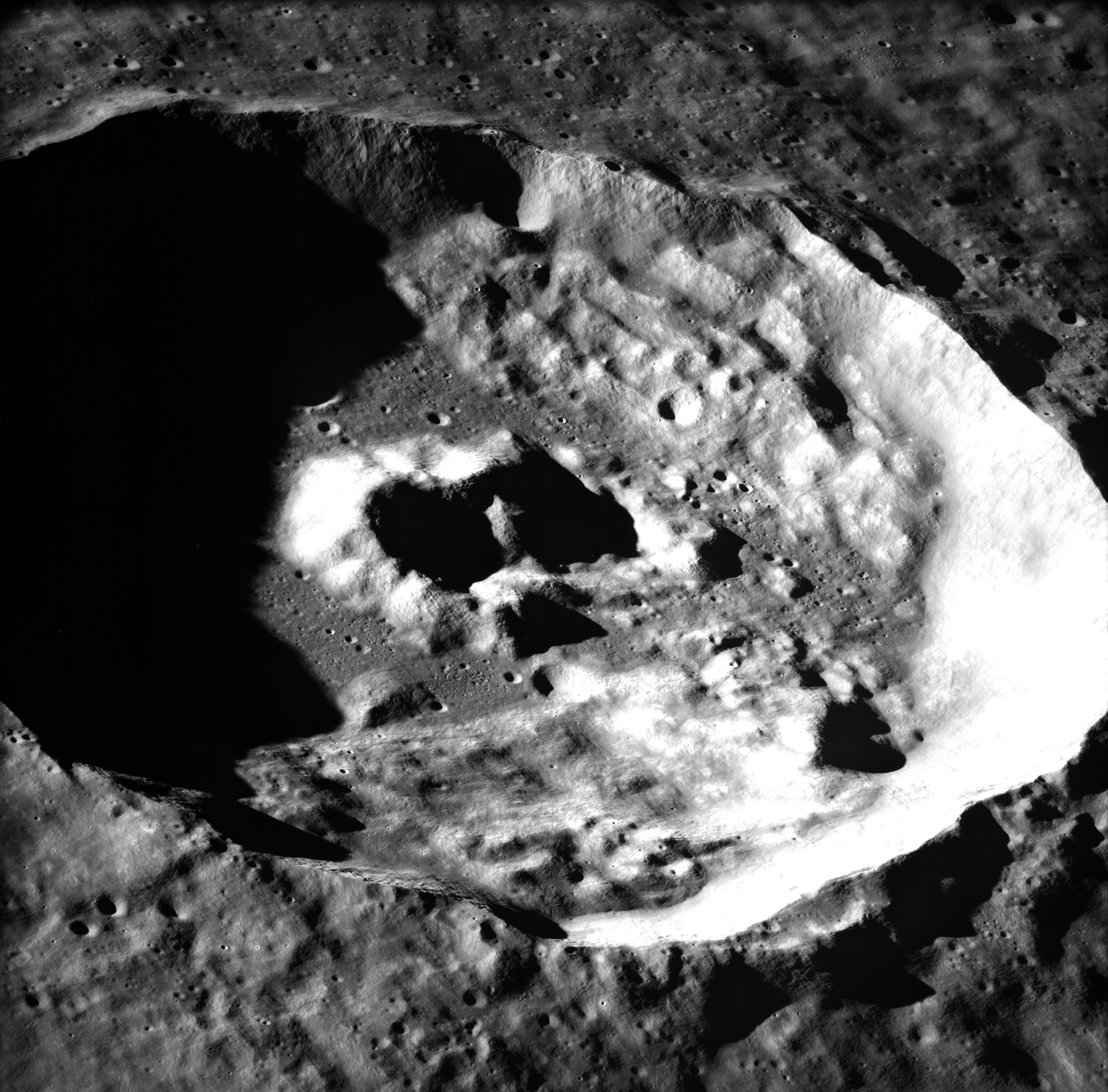
Another oblique view from Apollo 17, facing south, while the crater was near the sunrise terminator
