= Menelaus (crater) =

Crater on the Moon

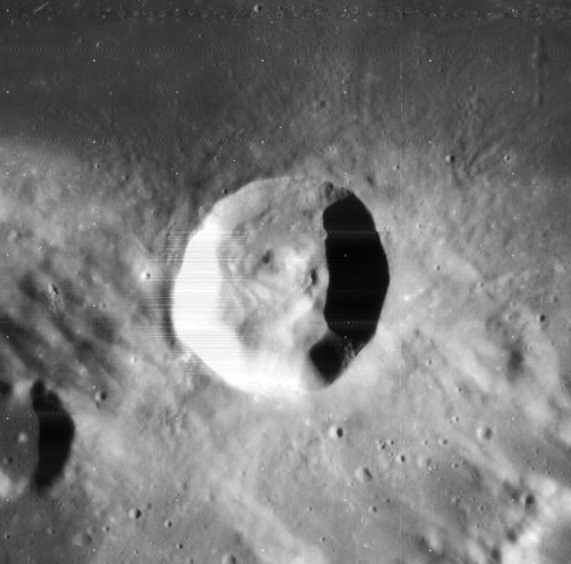
- Lunar Orbiter 4 image
- Coordinates: 16.26°N 15.93°E
- Diameter: 27.13 km (16.86 mi)
- Depth: 2.6 km (1.6 mi)
- Colongitude: 344° at sunrise
- Eponym: Menelaus of Alexandria

Menelaus (/ˌmɛnɪˈleɪəs/) is a young lunar impact crater located on the southern shore of Mare Serenitatis near the eastern end of the Montes Hæmus mountain range. Its diameter is 27 km. T. W. Webb described it as "a very steep crater...with a ring very brilliant" at full Moon. To the southwest is the small crater Auwers, and to the west-southwest is the even smaller Daubrée. To the northeast is a faint rille system named the Rimae Menelaus.

The wall of Menelaus is slightly irregular in outline, with a high, sharp rim and terraced inner walls. The infrared spectrum of pure crystalline plagioclase has been identified along the east and northeast walls. The interior has a high albedo that is prominent under high sun angles. There are several ridges on the floor. It has a moderate ray system, with the most prominent ray aligned to the north-northeast across the Mare Serenitatis. The location of this ray and slightly off-center central peak suggest an impact at a relatively low angle.

Menelaus is named after the ancient Greek astronomer Menelaus of Alexandria (c. 70 – 140 CE). Like many of the craters on the Moon's near side, it was given its name by Giovanni Riccioli, whose 1651 nomenclature system has become standardized. Earlier lunar cartographers had given the feature different names. Michael van Langren's 1645 map calls it "Mariae Imp. Rom." after Maria Anna, the Holy Roman Empress. And Johannes Hevelius called it "Byzantium (urbs)" after the city of Byzantium.

== Satellite craters ==
By convention these features are identified on lunar maps by placing the letter on the side of the crater midpoint that is closest to Menelaus.

Menelaus	Latitude	Longitude	Diameter
A	17.1° N	13.4° E	7 km
C	14.8° N	14.5° E	4 km
D	13.2° N	16.3° E	4 km
E	13.6° N	15.9° E	3 km

The following craters have been renamed by the IAU.

- Menelaus S - See Daubrée.

== Bright starlike bowl-shaped craterlet south of Menelaus ==
Telescopic observers of the full moon know the officially unnamed bright starlike craterlet south of Menelaus, at the northwestern end of Sinus Honoris. Its starlike appearance is also noticeable on the photographic version of chart LAC 60 (page 120) in The Clementine Atlas of the Moon (Ben Bussey / Paul D. Spudis).

== Gallery ==
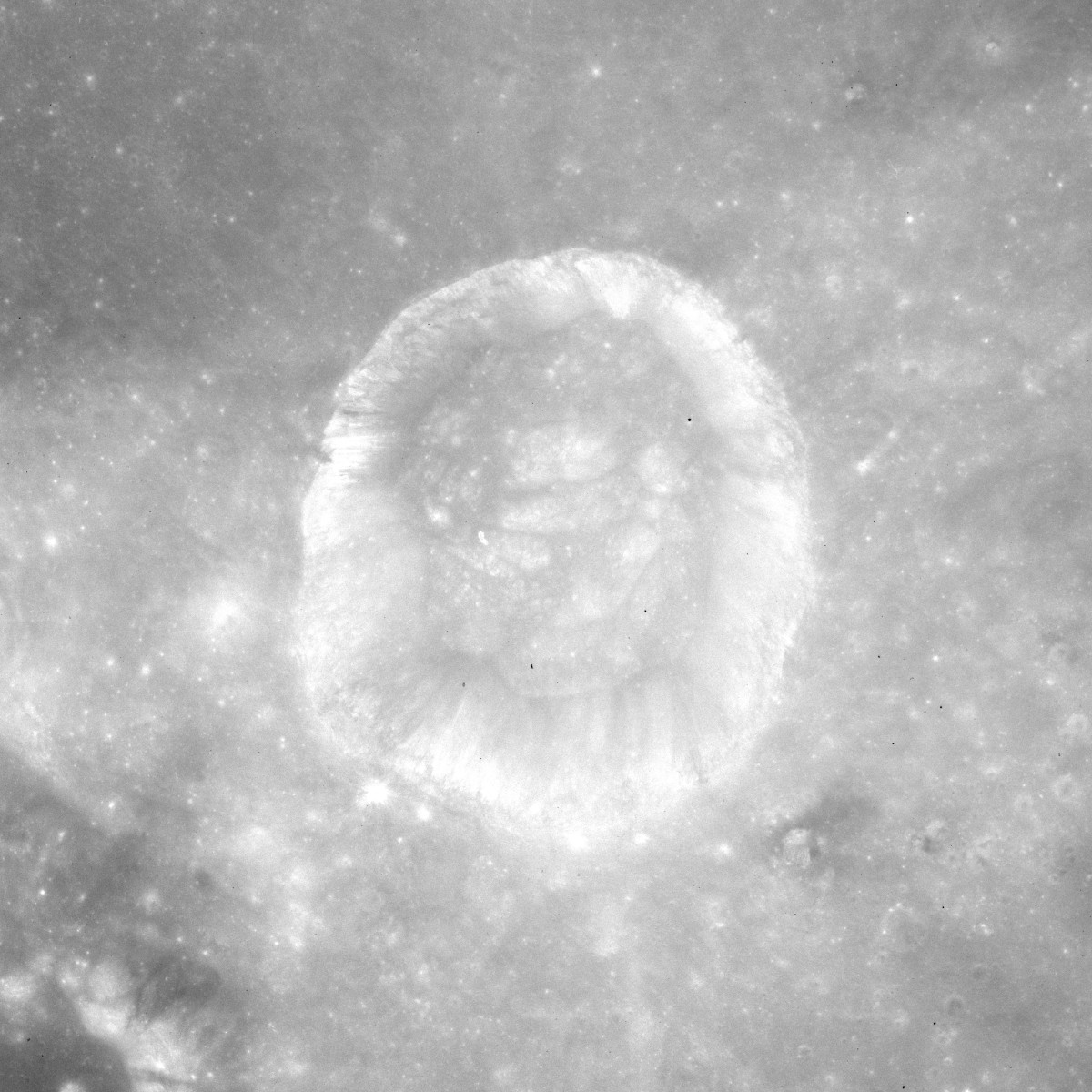
Apollo 15 image

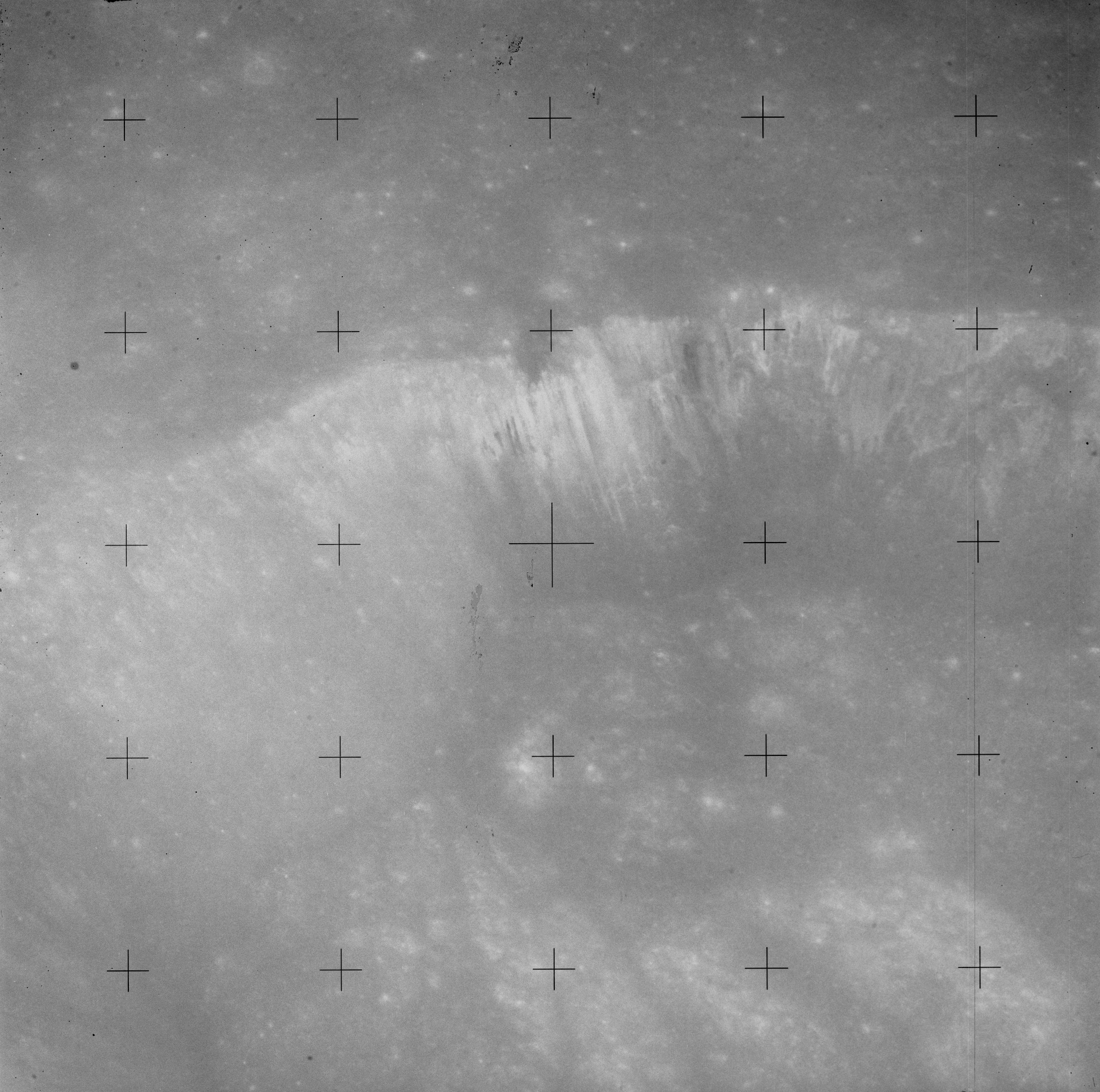
Oblique close up of the northwest crater wall, from Apollo 15

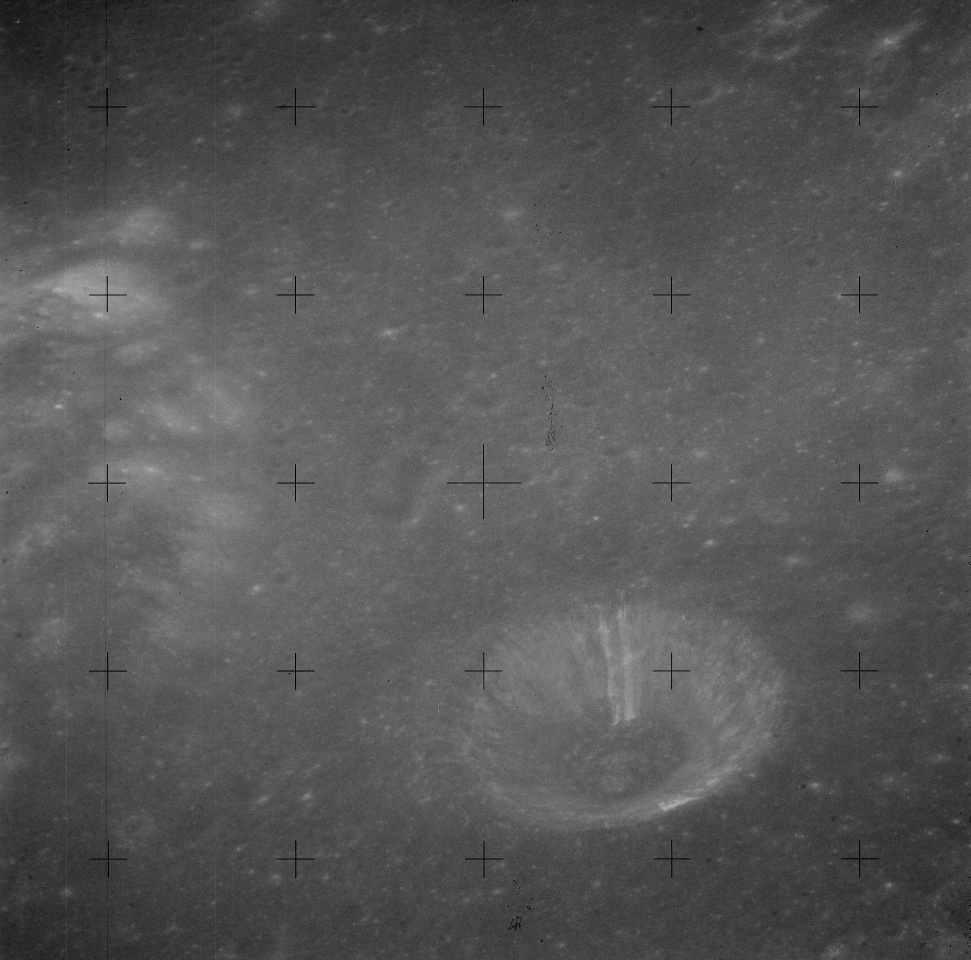
Menelaus A crater (lower right), from Apollo 15
