= Gabriel Auguste Daubrée =

French geologist

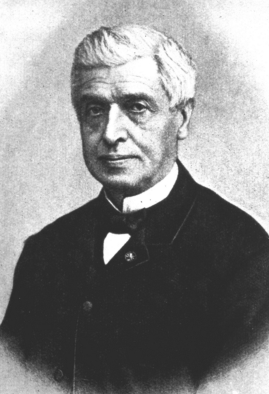
- Gabriel Auguste Daubrée
- Born: 25 June 1814; Metz
- Died: 29 May 1896 (aged 81); Paris 7ème
- Education: École Polytechnique
- Awards: Wollaston Medal (1880); Hayden Memorial Geological Award (1894)
- Scientific career
- Fields: geology
- Thesis: Sur les températures du globe terrestre et sur les principaux phénomènes géologiques qui paraissent être en rapport avec la chaleur propre de la terre (1838)

Gabriel Auguste Daubrée MIF FRS FRSE (25 June 1814 – 29 May 1896) was a French geologist, best known for applying experimental methods to structural geology. He served as the director of the École des Mines as well as the president of the French Academy of Sciences.

== Life ==
Daubrée was born at Metz, and educated at the École Polytechnique in Paris.

At the age of twenty he had qualified as a mining engineer, and in 1838 he was appointed to take charge of the mines in the Bas-Rhin (Alsace), and subsequently to be professor of mineralogy and geology at the Faculty of Sciences, Strasbourg. In 1859 he became engineer in chief of mines, and in 1861, upon the death of Louis Cordier, he was appointed professor of geology at the Museum d'Histoire Naturelle in Paris and was also elected member of the French Academy of Sciences. In the following year he became professor of mineralogy at the École des Mines, and in 1872 director of that school. In 1878 Daubrée was elected vice-president and in 1879 president of the French Academy of Sciences. In 1880 the Geological Society of London awarded to him the Wollaston medal. In 1881 he was promoted to Grand Officer of the French Legion of Honour.

His published research dates from 1841, when the origin of certain tin minerals attracted his attention; he subsequently discussed the formation of bog-iron ore, and worked out in detail the geology of the Bas-Rhin (1852). From 1857 to 1861, while engaged in engineering works connected with the springs of Plombieres, he made a series of observations on thermal waters and their influence on the Roman masonry through which they made their exit. He was, however, especially distinguished for his long-continued and often dangerous experiments on the artificial production of minerals and rocks. He likewise discussed the permeability of rocks by water, and the effects of such infiltration in producing volcanic phenomena; he dealt with the subject of metamorphism, with the deformations of the Earth's crust, with earthquakes, and with the composition and classification of meteorites.

He was elected an international Member of the American Philosophical Society in 1863, a Fellow of the Royal Society of London in 1881, a member of the Royal Swedish Academy of Sciences in 1892, and an Honorary Fellow of the Royal Society of Edinburgh in 1895.

He died in Paris on 29 May 1896.

== Legacy ==
A sulfide mineral found in meteorites (Daubréelite), a bismuth oxide (Daubréeite) and a crater on the Moon (Daubrée crater) were named after him.
