= Auwers (crater) =

Crater on the Moon

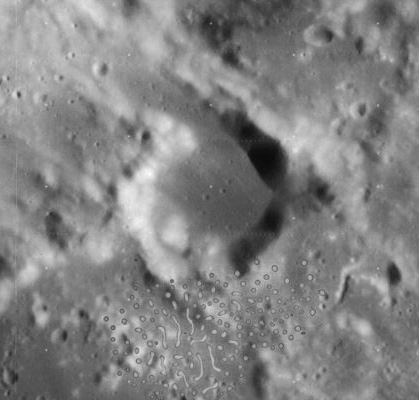
- Lunar Orbiter 4 image (blemish south of crater is present on original photo)
- Coordinates: 15.1°N 17.2°E
- Diameter: 19.64 km (12.20 mi)
- Depth: 1.7 km
- Colongitude: 343° at sunrise
- Eponym: Arthur Auwers

Auwers is a small lunar impact crater located in the Montes Haemus mountain range at the south edge of Mare Serenitatis. It lies southeast of the crater Menelaus. The altitude of the rim varies from 2.2 km in the northeast down to a few hundred meters in the north and northwest. There is a gap at the north-northwest edge, which apparently was filled with the lava flows that flood the interior.

This crater is named after German astronomer Arthur Auwers (1838-1915). Its designation was formally adopted by the International Astronomical Union in 1935. Its name was introduced into lunar nomenclature by Johann N. Krieger and Rudolf König in 1912.

== Satellite craters ==
By convention these features are identified on lunar maps by placing the letter on the side of the crater midpoint that is closest to Auwers.

Auwers	Latitude	Longitude	Diameter
A	13.8° N	18.3° E	8 km

== Gallery ==
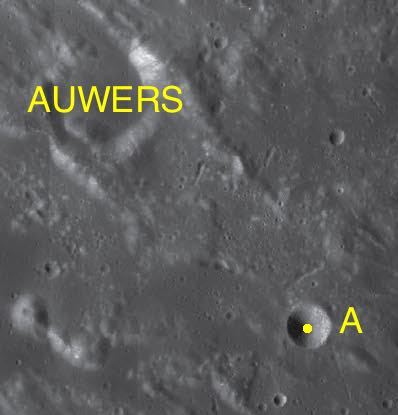
Auwers and its Satellite craters

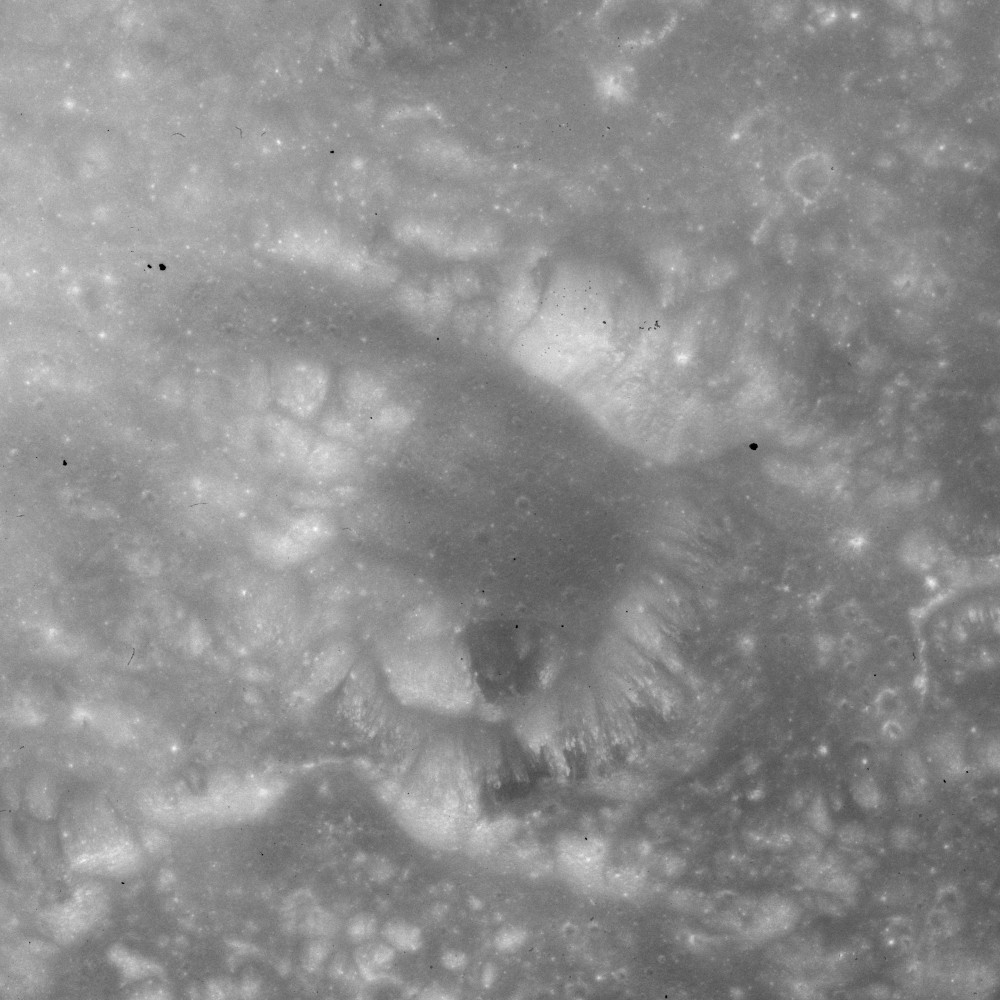
An image captured by the Apollo 15 mission.
