= Lacus Doloris =

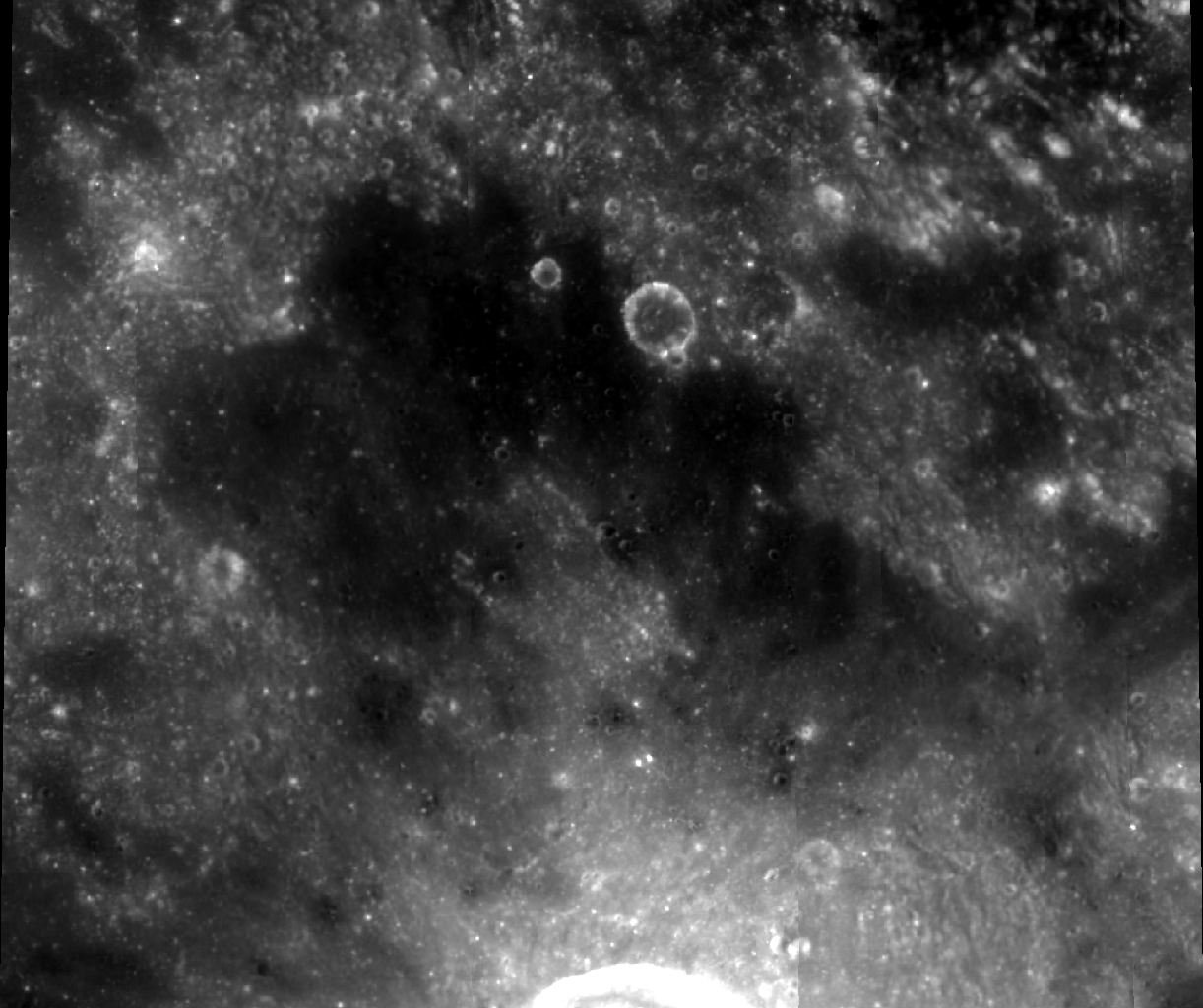
- Coordinates: 16.8°N 8.6°E
- Diameter: 103 km

Lacus Doloris /ˈleɪkəs dəˈlɔːrɪs/ (Latin dolōris, "Lake of Sorrow") is a small lunar mare located in the Terra Nivium region at 16.8° N, 8.6° E. It is 103 km in diameter.
