= Lacus Gaudii =

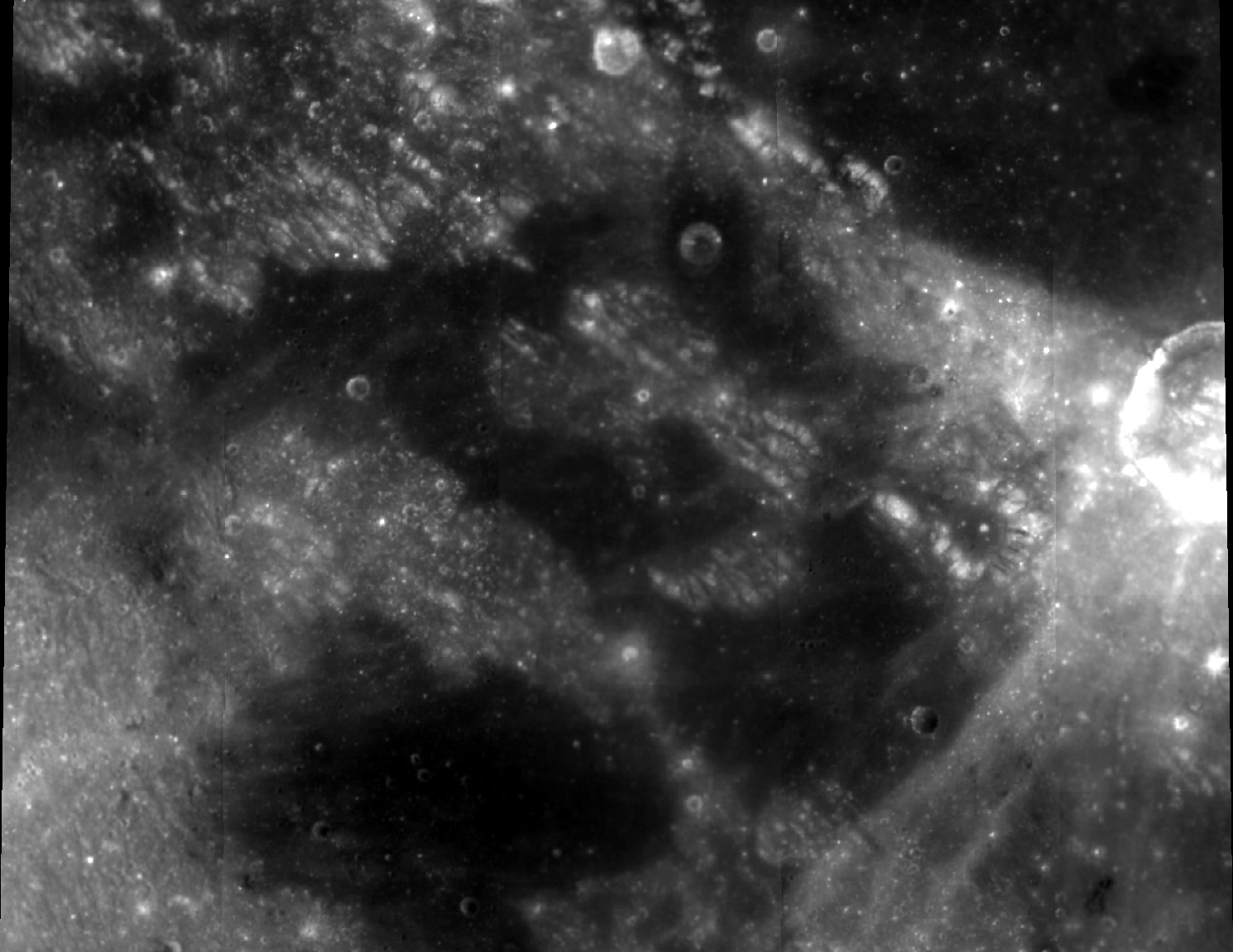
- Coordinates: 16.3°N 12.3°E
- Diameter: 89 km

Lacus Gaudii (Latin gaudiī, "Lake of Joy") is a small lunar mare in the Terra Nivium region of the Moon. It is located at 16.3° N, 12.3° E and is 89 km in diameter.
