= Lacus Lenitatis =

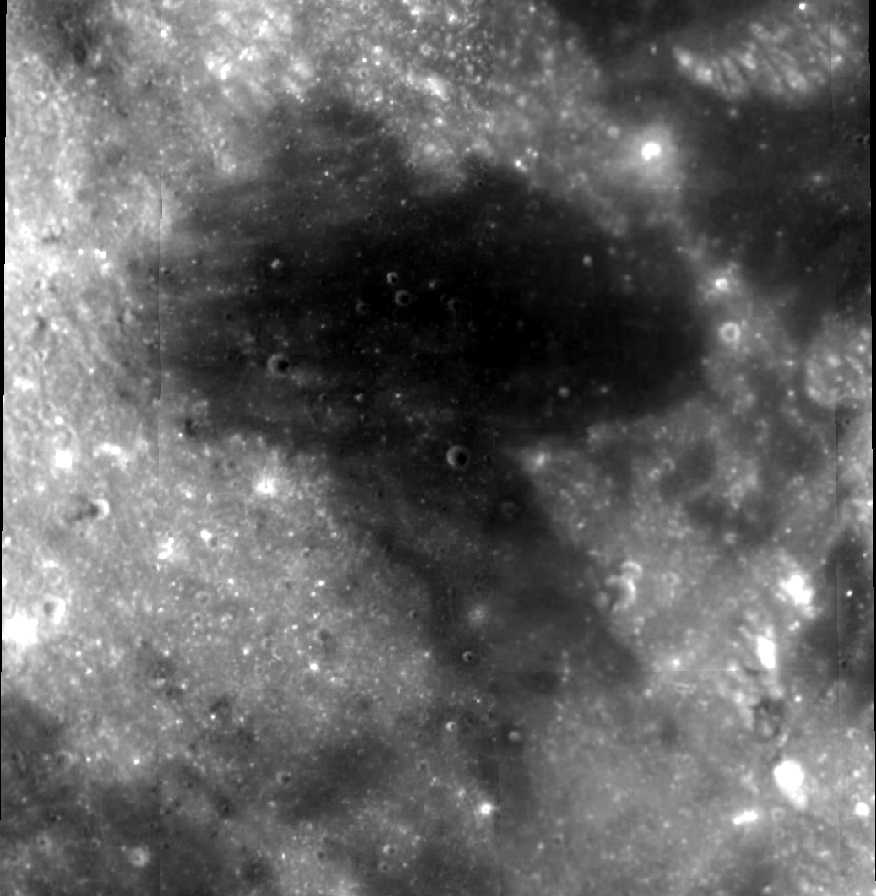
- Clementine image
- Coordinates: 14.32°N 12.05°E
- Diameter: 78.25 km (48.62 mi)

Lacus Lenitatis (Latin lēnitātis, for "Lake of Softness") is a small lunar mare in the Terra Nivium region on the Moon.

Another small mare called Lacus Hiemalis is to the northeast of Lacus Lenitatis.
