= Lacus Odii =

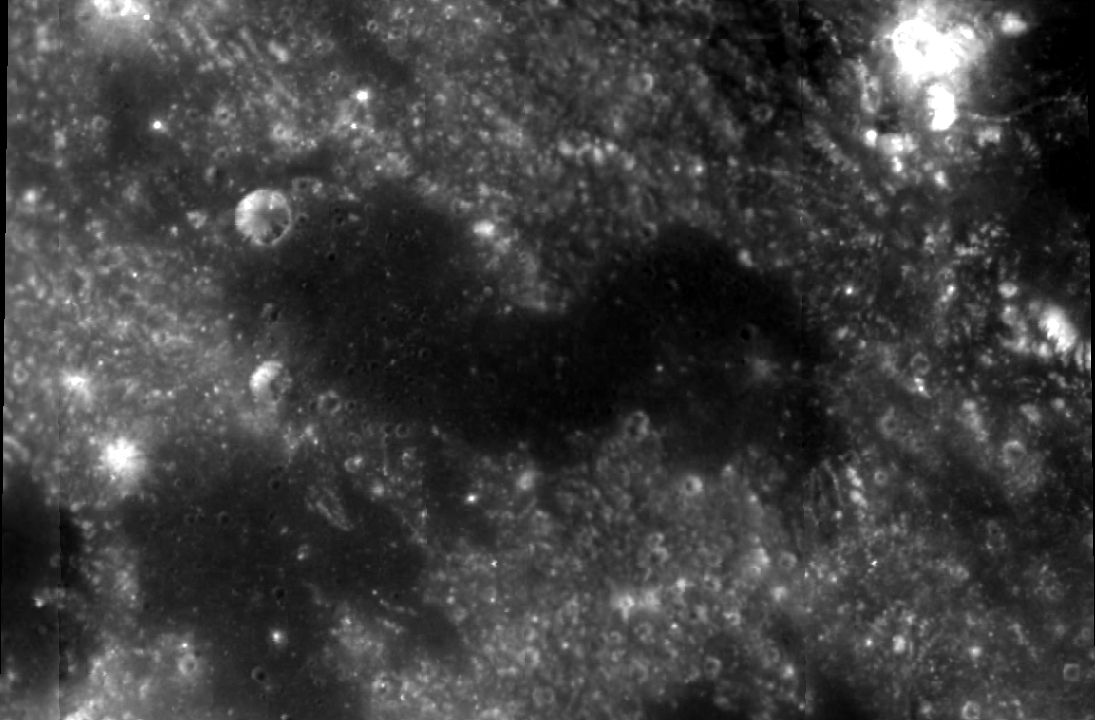
- Coordinates: 19.0°N 7.0°E
- Diameter: 70 km
- Eponym: Lake of Hate

Lacus Odii (Latin odiī, "Lake of Hate") is a small lunar mare in the Terra Nivium region on the Moon. It is located at 19.0° N, 7.0° E and is 70 km in diameter.
