= Lacus Hiemalis =

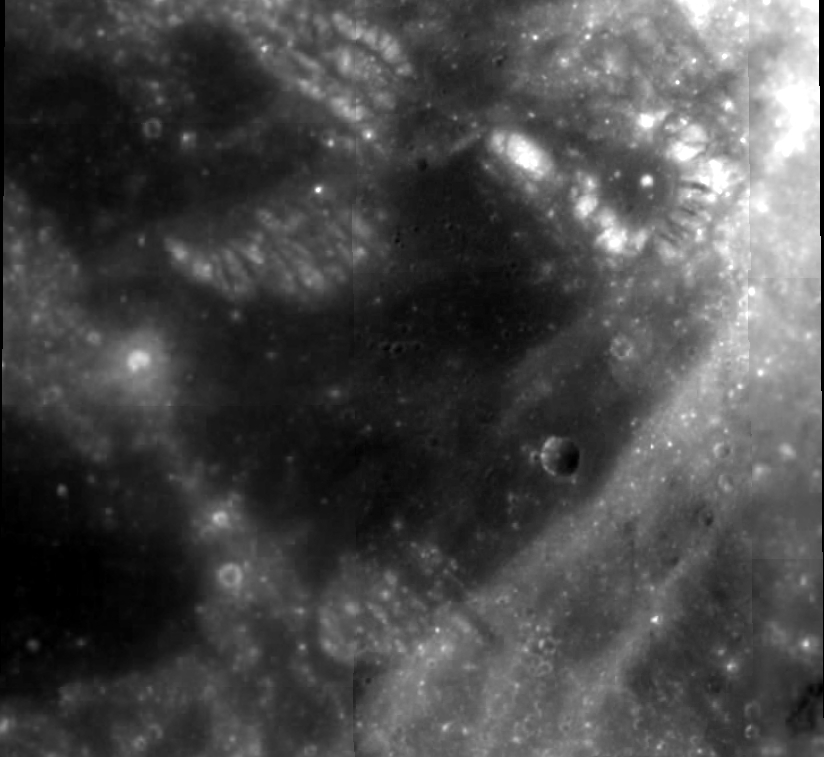
- Clementine image
- Coordinates: 15.01°N 13.97°E
- Diameter: 48.04 km (29.85 mi)
- Eponym: Lake of Winter

Lacus Hiemalis (Latin hiemālis, "Lake of Winter") is a small lunar mare in the Terra Nivium region on the Moon.

The crater Daubrée is to the northeast of the lacus, and Lacus Lenitatis is to the southwest.
