= Promontorium Archerusia =

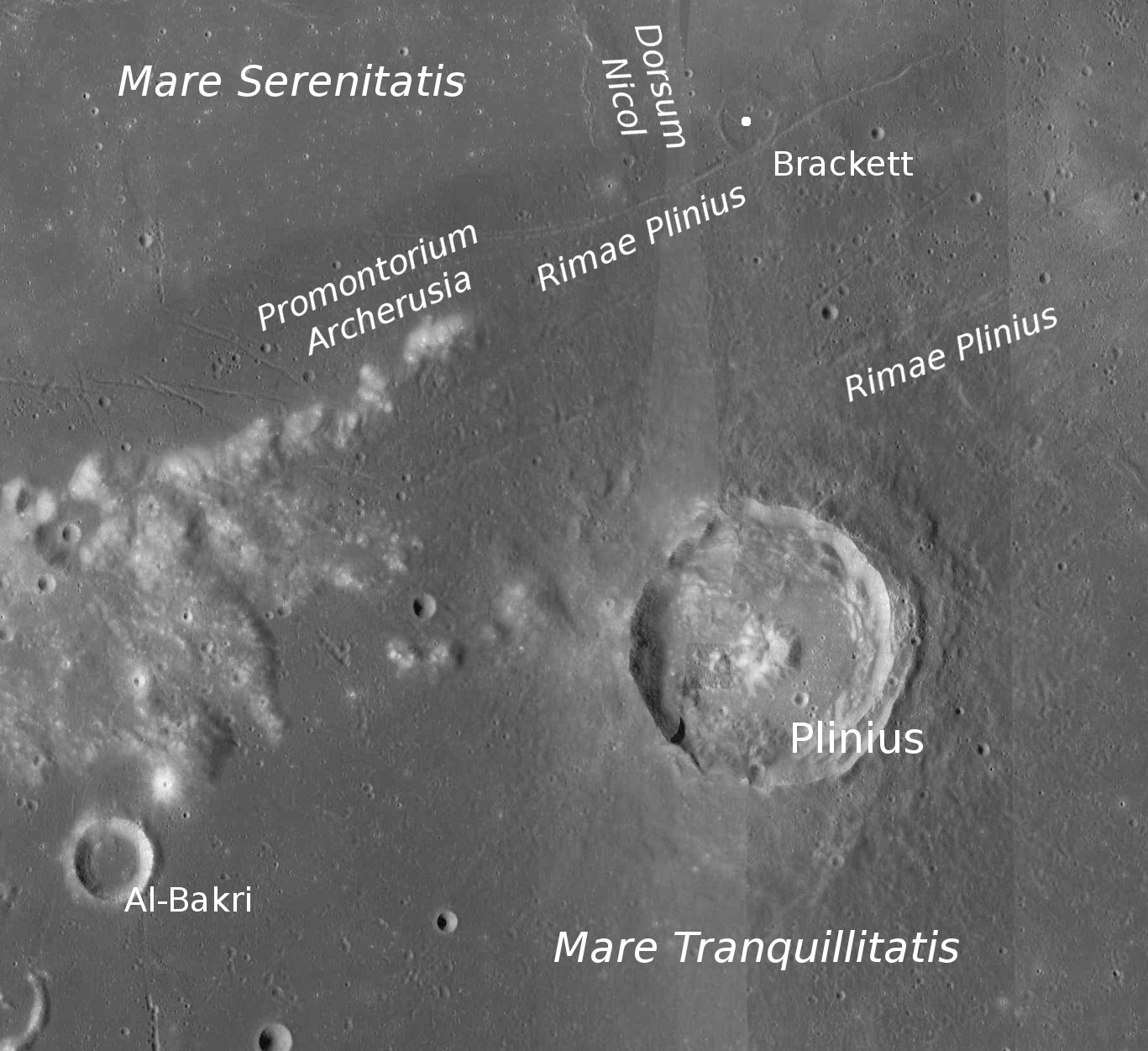
Promonontorium Archerusia is on the left of the LRO image

Promontorium Archerusia (/ˌɑːrkəˈruːʒə/; Latin for "Cape Archerusia") is a headland on the near side of the Moon. It separates the lunar mares of Mare Serenitatis and Mare Tranquilitatis. Its coordinates are 16.8°N 21.9°E.

Promontorium Archerusia was named by Johannes Hevelius and is a misspelling of Acherusia, a cape on the Black Sea near Heraclea in ancient Bithynia (now Karadeniz Ereğli in Turkey).
