= Arthur Auwers =

German astronomer (1838–1915)

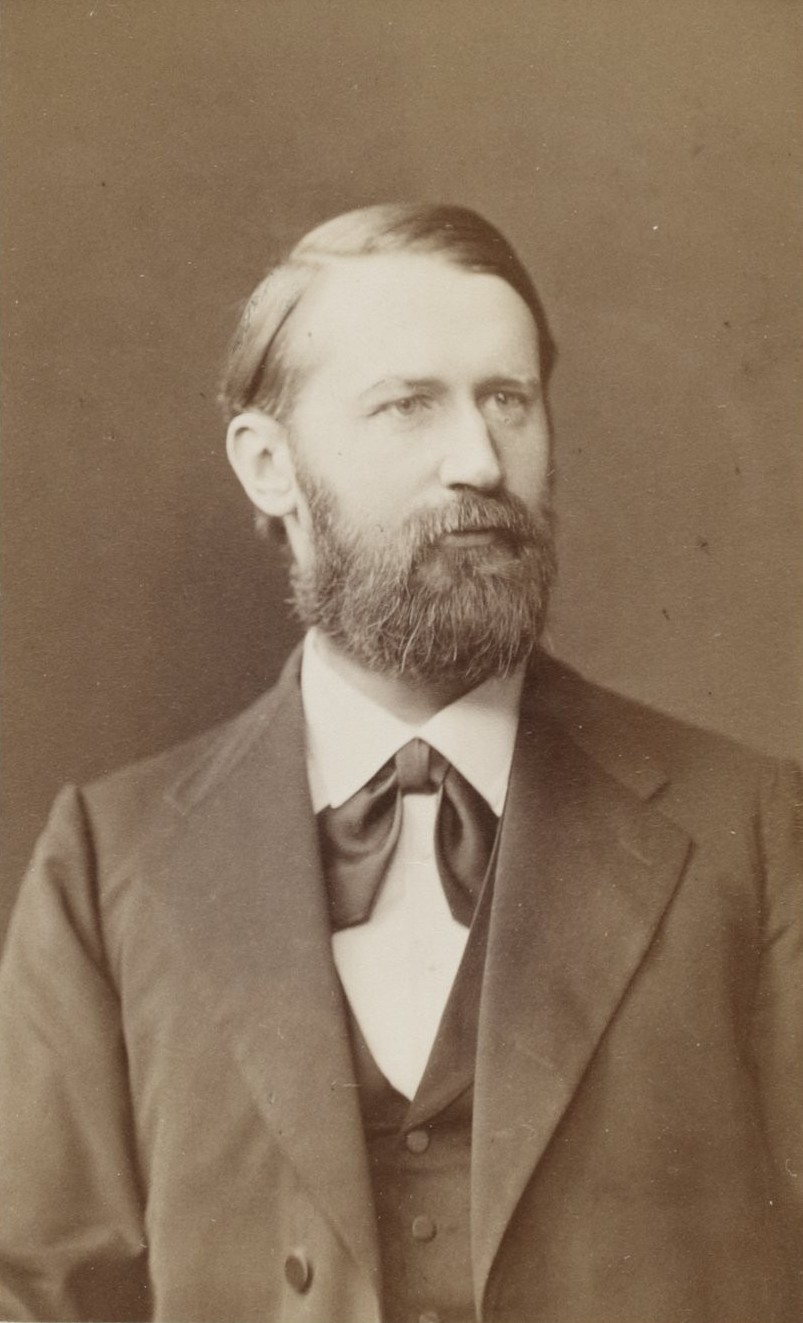
- Arthur Auwers in 1884
- Born: 12 September 1838; Göttingen
- Died: 24 January 1915 (aged 76); Berlin
- Scientific career
- Fields: Astronomy

Georg Friedrich Julius Arthur von Auwers (12 September 1838 – 24 January 1915) was a German astronomer. Auwers was born in Göttingen to Gottfried Daniel Auwers and Emma Christiane Sophie (née Borkenstein).

He attended the University of Göttingen and worked at the University of Königsberg. He specialized in astrometry, making very precise measurements of stellar positions and motions. He detected the companion stars of Sirius and Procyon from their effects on the main star's motion, before telescopes were powerful enough to visually observe them. He was from 1866 Secretary to the Berlin Academy, and directed expeditions to measure the transits of Venus, in order to measure the distance from the earth to the Sun more accurately, and therefore be able to calculate the dimensions of the Solar System more accurately and with greater precision. He began a project to unify all available sky charts, an interest that began with his catalog of nebulae which he published in 1862. He died in Berlin. His grave is preserved in the Protestant Friedhof I der Jerusalems- und Neuen Kirchengemeinde (Cemetery No. I of the congregations of Jerusalem's Church and New Church) in Berlin-Kreuzberg, south of Hallesches Tor.

His son Karl von Auwers became a well known chemist and discoverer of the Auwers synthesis.

== Honors ==
Awards

- Foreign Honorary Member of the American Academy of Arts and Sciences, 1880
- Gold Medal of the Royal Astronomical Society, 1888
- James Craig Watson Medal, 1891
- Pour le Mérite (civil class), 31 May 1892
- Bruce Medal, 1899
- The crater Auwers on the Moon is named after him
