= Montes Apenninus =

Mountain range on the Moon

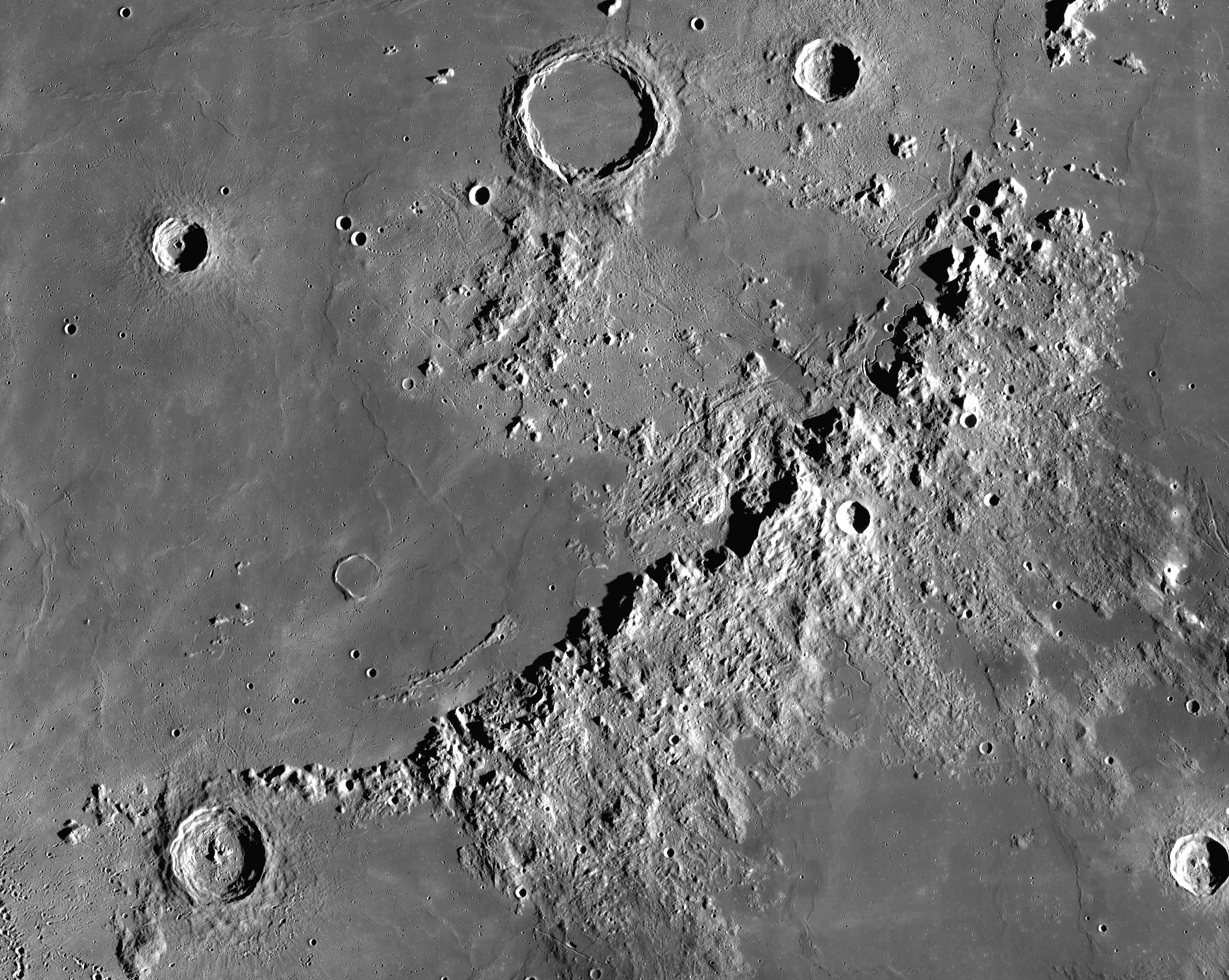
- LRO image

Highest point
- Listing: Lunar mountains
- Coordinates: 20°N 3°W

Naming
- English translation: Apennine Mountains

Geography
- Location: Moon

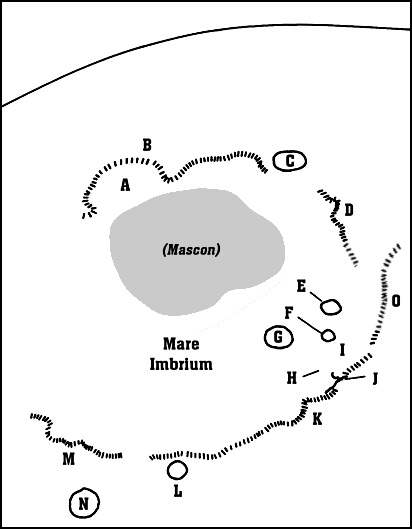
Detail map of Mare Imbrium's features. Montes Apenninus is marked with a "K".

Montes Apenninus are a rugged mountain range on the northern part of the Moon's near side. They are named after the Apennine Mountains in Italy. With their formation dating back about 3.9 billion years, Montes Apenninus are fairly old.

== Description ==
Montes Apenninus is the most prominent remnant of the outer ring of the Imbrium basin, which also includes Montes Carpatus to its south and Montes Caucasus to its north.

The Montes Apenninus range forms the southeastern border of the large Mare Imbrium lunar mare and the northwestern border of the Terra Nivium highland region. It begins just to the west of the prominent crater Eratosthenes, which abuts against the southern face of the range. To the west of these mountains is a narrow gap where Mare Imbrium in the north joins Mare Insularum to the south. Further to the west are the Montes Carpatus mountains.

From Eratosthenes, the mountains form an arcing chain that gradually bends from east to northeast, ending at Promontorium Fresnel at about latitude 29.5° N. Here is another gap where the Mare Imbrium to the west joins the Mare Serenitatis to the east. At the north end of this gap lie the Montes Caucasus.

This range contains several mountains that have received names, listed below ranging from west to northeast:

- Mons Wolff
- Mons Serao (unofficial name)
- Mons Ampère
- Mons Huygens, often incorrectly listed as the highest mountain on the Moon (though not the highest point)
- Mons Bradley
- Mons Hadley Delta
- Mons Hadley

The last two peaks form the valley where the Apollo 15 mission made its landing. This landing was considered one of the most scientifically successful missions of the Apollo program and started the last three J-Series missions that included the lunar rover and 3-day stays. Apollo 15 explored smaller peak Mons Hadley Delta (δ) and Rima Hadley rille. This was considered the most geologically diverse landing site of the program. One feature of the Montes Apenninus is the "Swann Ridge", informally named by the Apollo 15 astronauts after Gordon Swann, the Principal Investigator of the Apollo Lunar Geologic Experiment.

Montes Apenninus forms a sharp, rugged rise at the edge of the Mare Imbrium. The total length of the range is about 600 km (370 mi), with some of the peaks rising as high as 5 km (3.1 mi). The entire area to the southeast of Montes Apenninus – its backslopes – is shaped by ejecta deposited during the violent uplift of the mountains. Sections of the Montes Apenninus front are also rubbly, a result of both fallback ejecta and landslides from the newly formed peaks.

== Views ==
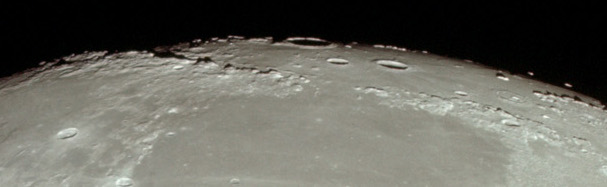
View of the limb of the Moon showing Montes Apenninus (left), Montes Caucasus (right), eastern Mare Imbrium (top), and western Mare Serenitatis (bottom), from Apollo 11. The large crater at the top center is Archimedes.

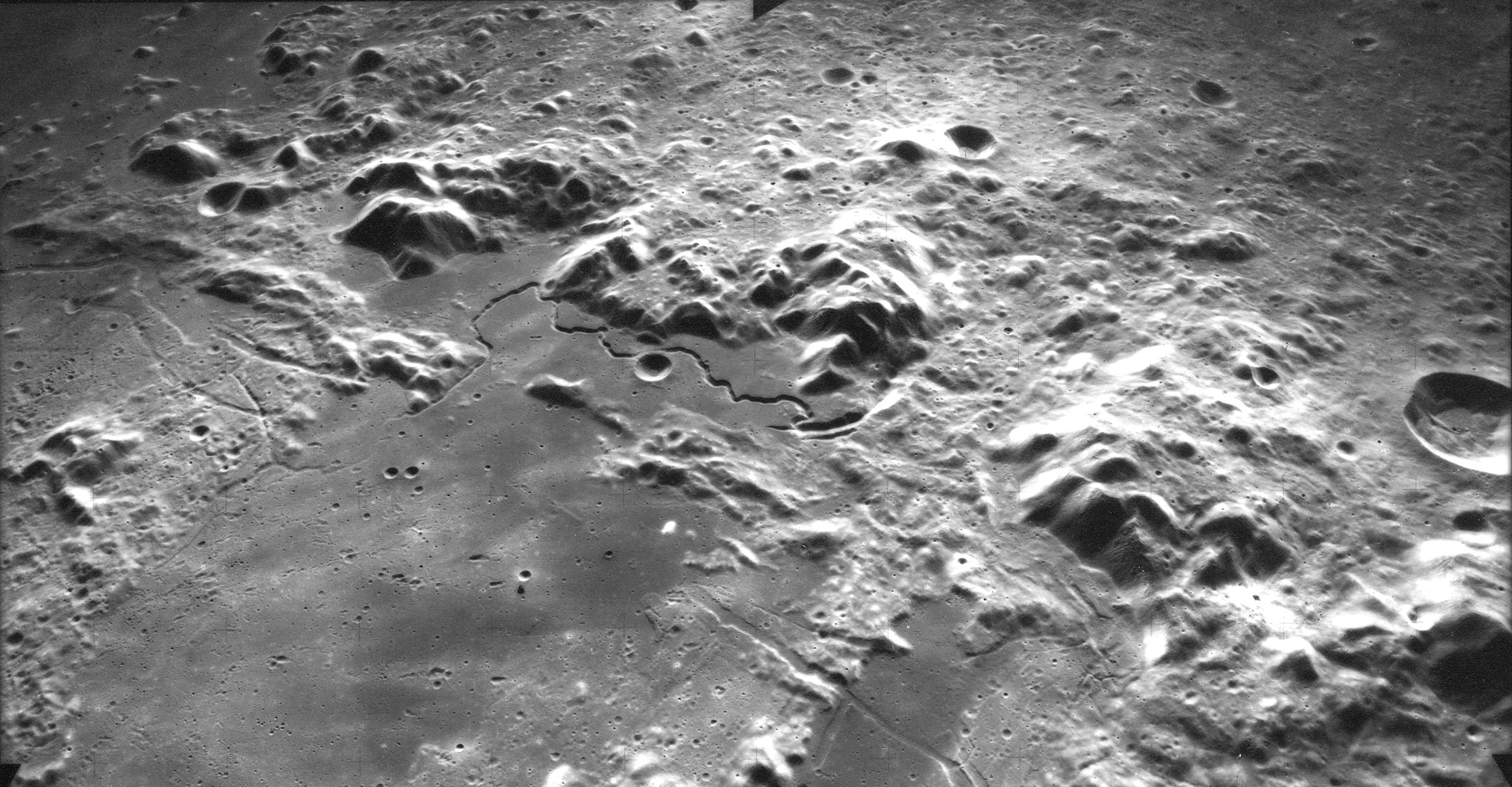
Oblique view of the northern Montes Apenninus facing east from 105 km altitude, with Hadley Rille and the Apollo 15 landing site left of center. Mons Hadley, Mons Hadley Delta, and Mons Bradley are visible. The large crater at right edge is Conon.

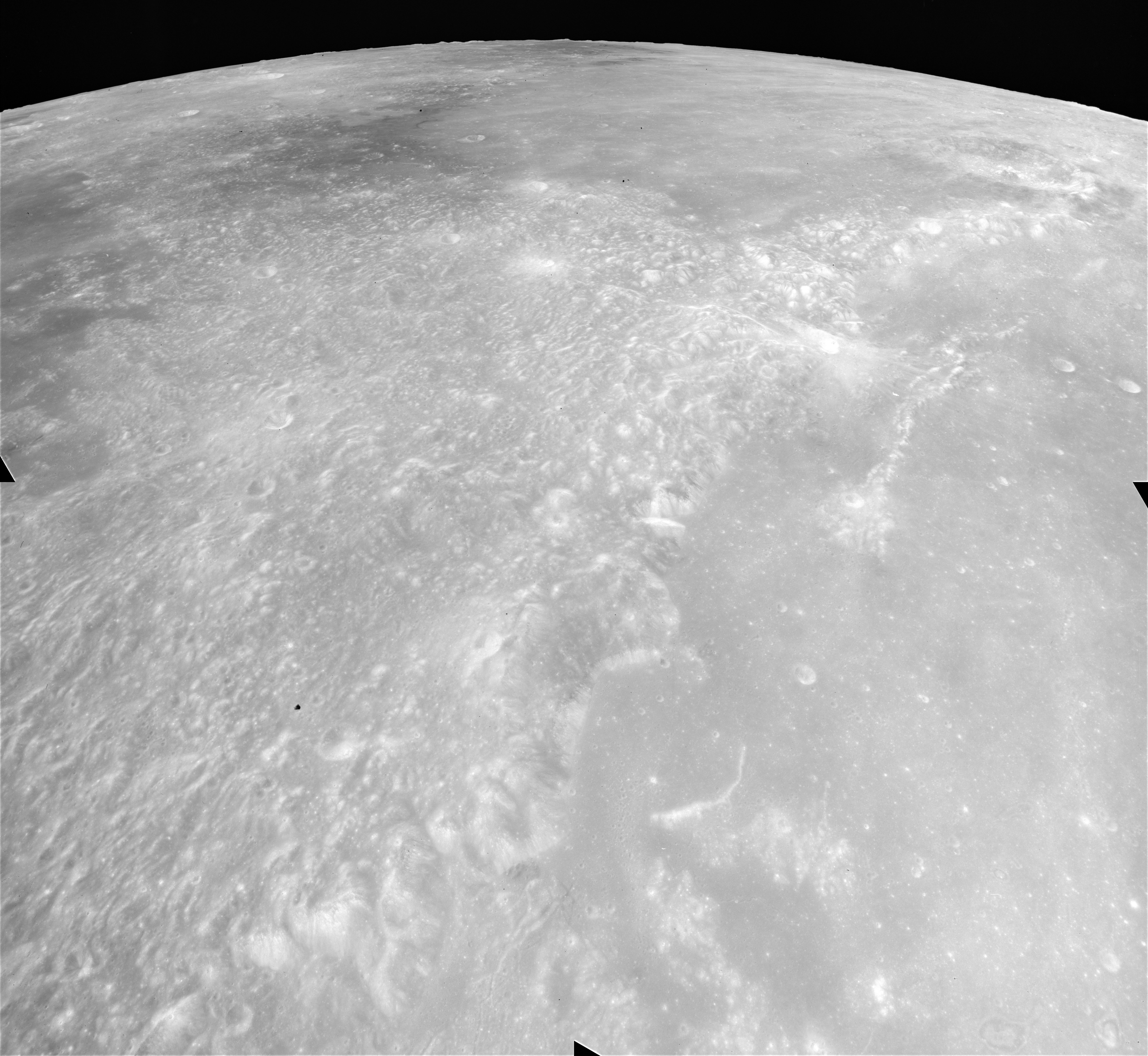
Oblique view of the southern Montes Apenninus facing south from 115 km altitude, with Eratosthenes in upper right (Apollo 15)

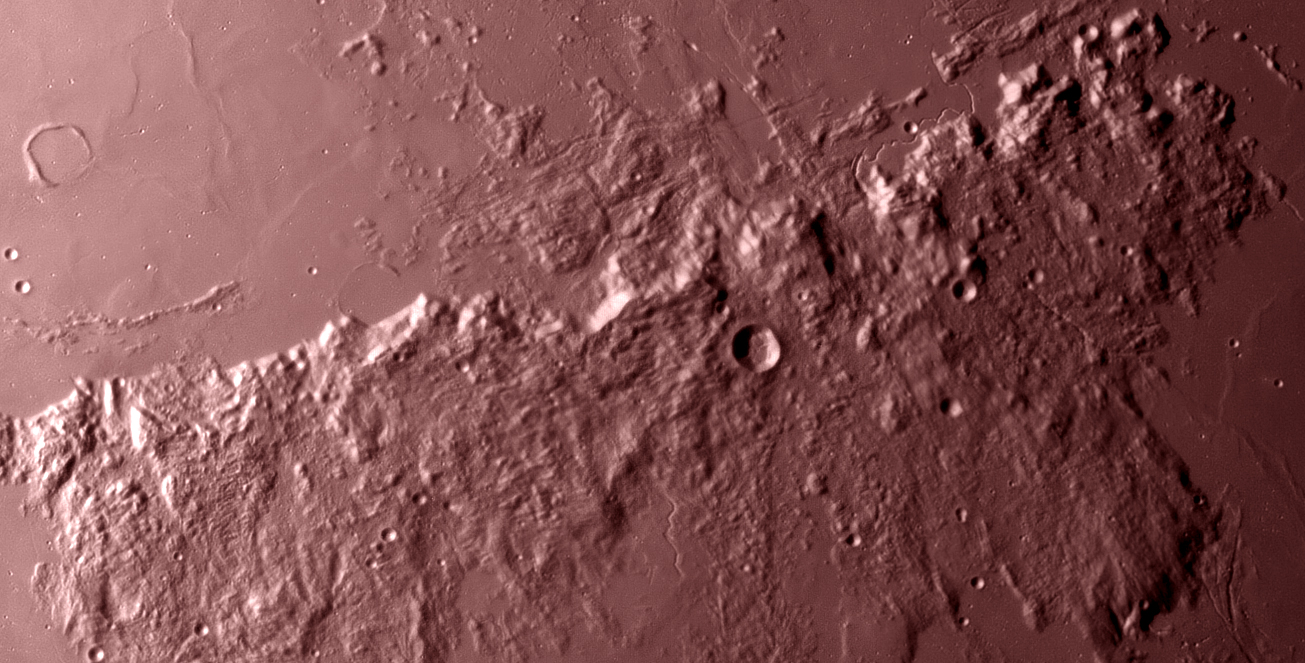
Montes Apenninus in the infrared. Image courtesy of NOT and SO: M. Gålfalk, G. Olofsson, and H.-G. Florén, taken with the SIRCA camera.
