= Reinhold (crater) =

Crater on the Moon

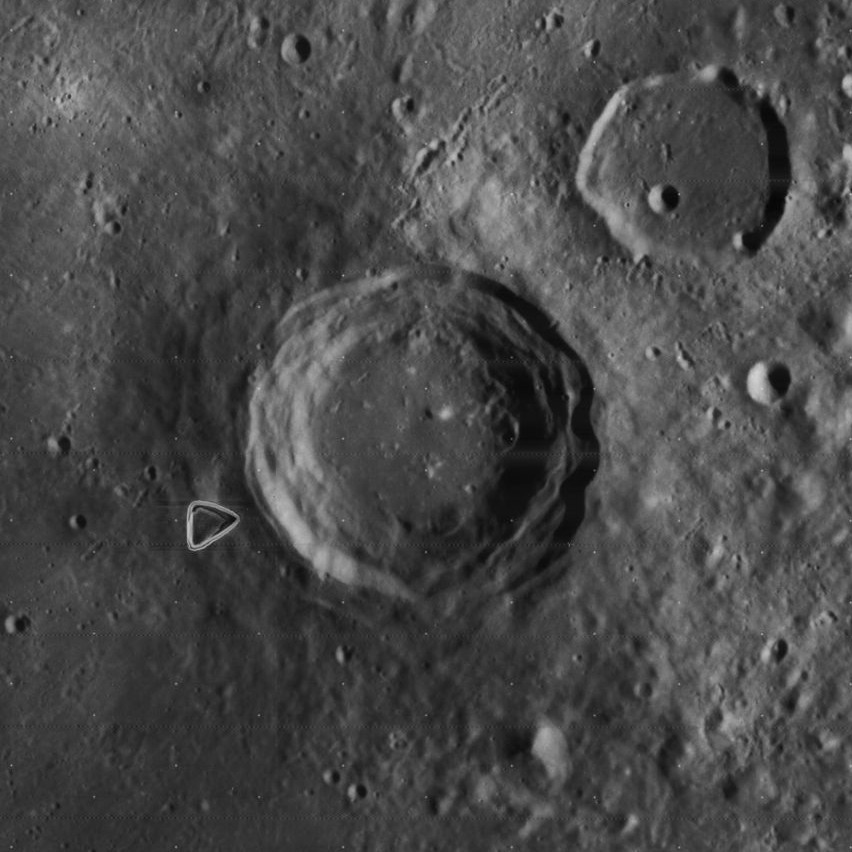
- Lunar Orbiter 4 image of Reinhold (center) and Reinhold B (upper right) (triangular spot is blemish on original)
- Coordinates: 3.28°N 22.86°W
- Diameter: 43.28 km
- Depth: 2.70 km
- Colongitude: 23° at sunrise
- Formation: Eratosthenian
- Eponym: Erasmus Reinhold

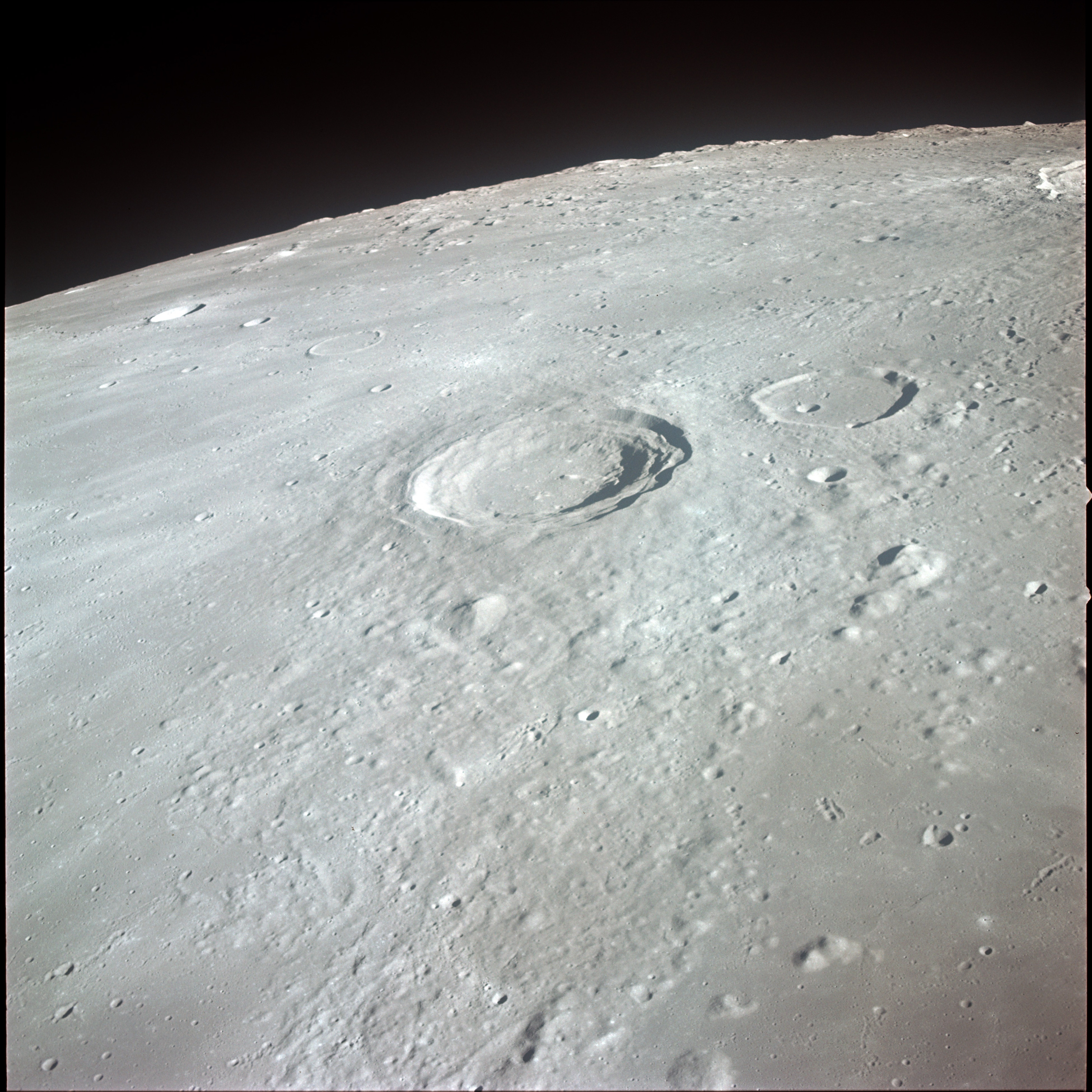
Oblique view from Apollo 12

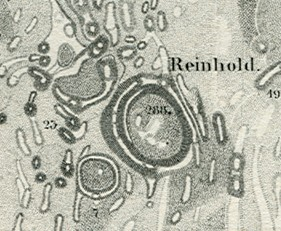
Crater Reinhold by Wilhelm Gotthelf Lohrmann (1878)

Reinhold is a prominent lunar impact crater that lies to the south-southwest of the crater Copernicus, on the Mare Insularum. It was named after 16th century German astronomer and mathematician Erasmus Reinhold. To the southwest is the slightly smaller crater Lansberg.

The interior walls are terraced and the irregular outer ramparts are visible against the flat surface of the mare. The interior floor is relatively featureless, with only a few low rises. Just to the northeast is a low, flooded crater designated Reinhold B.

Reinhold is a crater of Eratosthenian age.

== Reinhold during full moon ==
Prominent crater Reinhold is a distinct surface formation during local sunrise (morning terminator) and also during local sunset (evening terminator), but not during full moon. The albedo value of Reinhold is the same as its environs. The southern section of the system of ejectarays from Copernicus eliminates the visibility of all details in and around Reinhold. Very little or almost nothing of Reinhold is seen on the photographic version of chart LAC 58 (page 116) in The Clementine Atlas of the Moon (Ben Bussey / Paul D. Spudis).

== Satellite craters ==
By convention these features are identified on current lunar maps by placing the letter on the side of the crater midpoint that is closest to Reinhold.

Reinhold	Latitude	Longitude	Diameter
main	3.3° N	22.8° W	48 km
A	4.1° N	21.7° W	4 km
B	4.3° N	21.7° W	26 km
C	4.4° N	24.5° W	4 km
D	2.6° N	24.5° W	2 km
F	3.4° N	21.4° W	5 km
G	4.8° N	19.8° W	3 km
H	4.2° N	20.9° W	4 km
N	1.6° N	25.4° W	4 km
