= Stadius (crater) =

Crater on the Moon

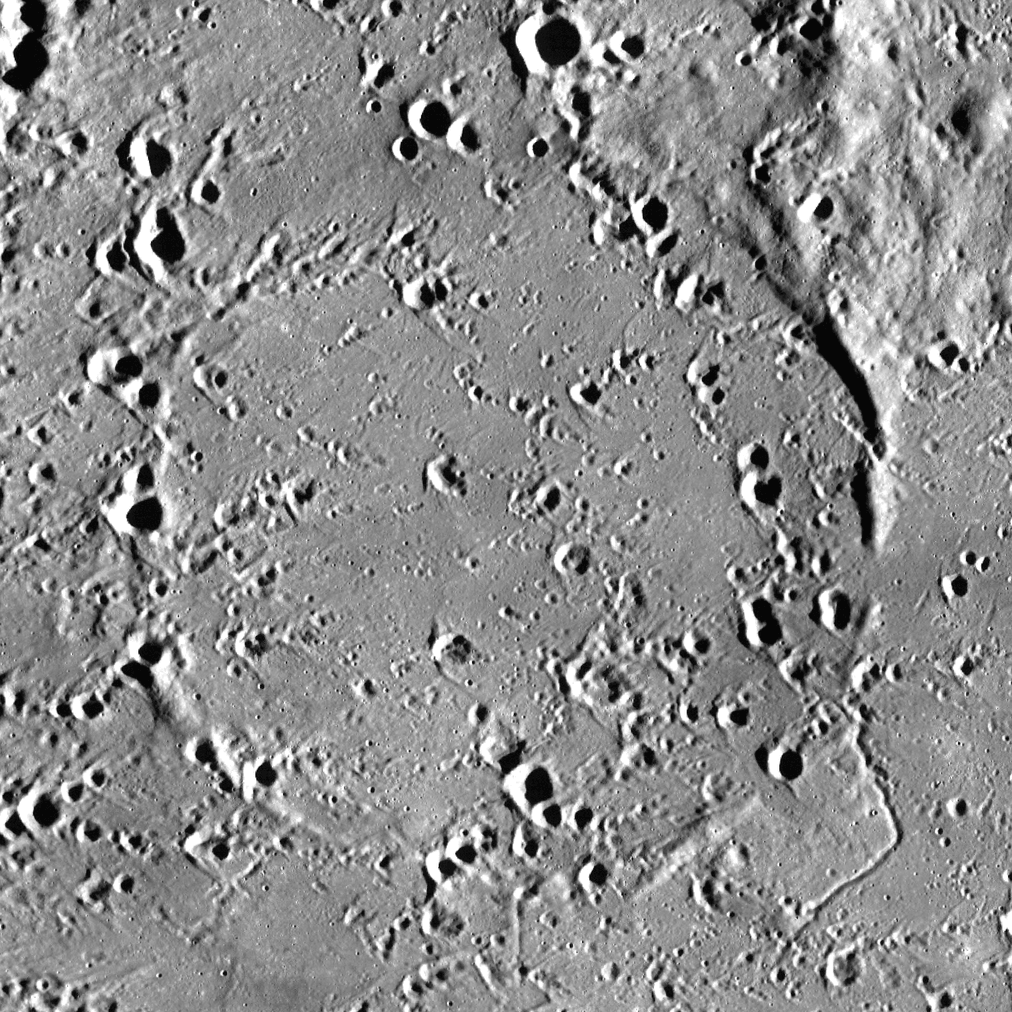
- LRO mosaic image
- Coordinates: 10.48°N 13.77°W
- Diameter: 69 km
- Colongitude: 13° at sunrise
- Eponym: Johannes Stadius

Stadius is a ghostly remnant of an ancient lunar impact crater that has been nearly obliterated by basaltic lava flows. It was named after Flemish astronomer Johannes Stadius. It lies to the southwest of the much younger crater Eratosthenes, at the north edge of Mare Insularum where the mare joins Sinus Aestuum. To the west is the prominent ray crater Copernicus, and multiple secondary craters from the Copernican ejecta cover this area. To the northwest is a chain of craters that continue in a roughly linear formation until reaching Mare Imbrium.

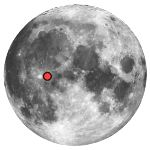
Location map of Stadius in the Nearside of the Moon

Only the northwestern rim of Stadius remains nearly intact, and it joins with a north-running ridge line that reaches the western rampart of Eratosthenes. The remainder of the formation forms a ghostly trace of the original rim, created from a few rises in the surface, and there is no indication of a central peak. The flat crater floor is pock-marked by craterlets, many of which were generated by secondary impacts from the creation of Copernicus.

== Satellite craters ==
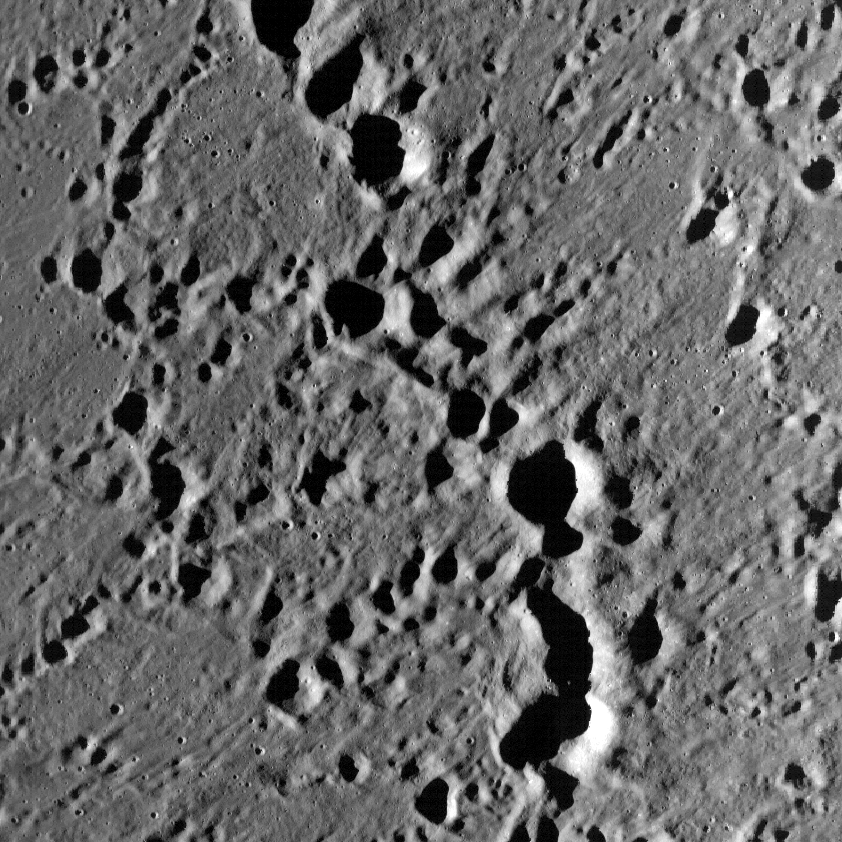
Secondary crater field of Stadius (LRO image from January 2010)

By convention these features are identified on lunar maps by placing the letter on the side of the crater midpoint that is closest to Stadius.

Stadius	Latitude	Longitude	Diameter
A	10.4° N	14.8° W	5 km
B	11.8° N	13.6° W	6 km
C	9.7° N	12.8° W	3 km
D	10.3° N	15.3° W	4 km
E	12.6° N	15.6° W	5 km
F	13.0° N	15.7° W	5 km
G	11.2° N	14.8° W	5 km
H	11.6° N	13.9° W	4 km
J	13.8° N	16.1° W	4 km
K	9.7° N	13.6° W	4 km
L	10.1° N	12.9° W	3 km
M	14.7° N	16.5° W	7 km
N	9.4° N	15.7° W	5 km
P	11.8° N	15.2° W	6 km
Q	11.5° N	14.8° W	4 km
R	12.2° N	15.2° W	6 km
S	12.9° N	15.5° W	5 km
T	13.2° N	15.7° W	7 km
U	13.9° N	16.4° W	5 km
W	14.1° N	16.4° W	5 km

== Popular culture ==
Within the Sega CD RPG Lunar: The Silver Star (and all subsequent remakes) there is a region called the Stadius Zone, which is named after the Stadius crater.
