= T. Mayer (crater) =

Crater on the Moon

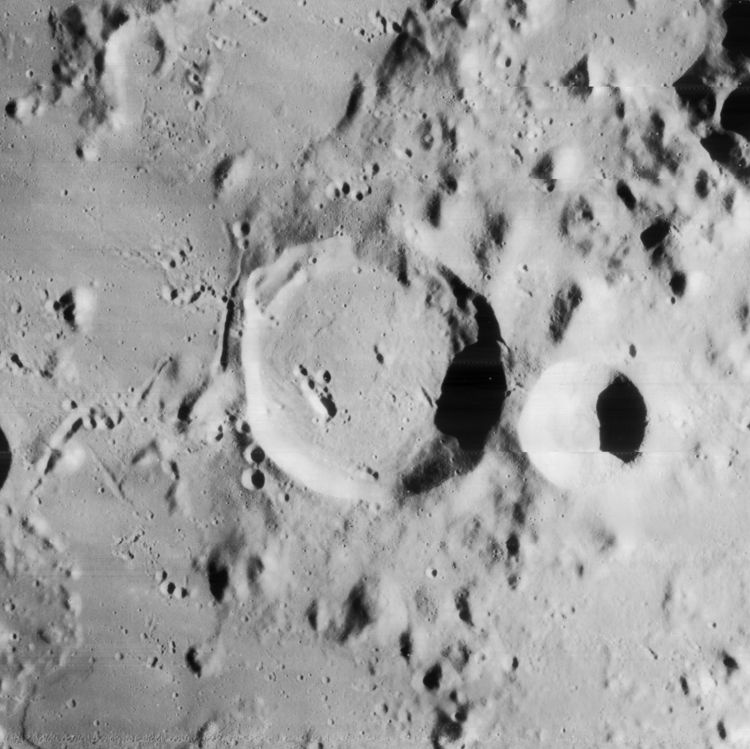
- Lunar Orbiter 4 image
- Coordinates: 15.6°N 29.1°W
- Diameter: 33 km
- Depth: 1.95 km (1.21 mi)
- Colongitude: 29° at sunrise
- Eponym: Tobias Mayer

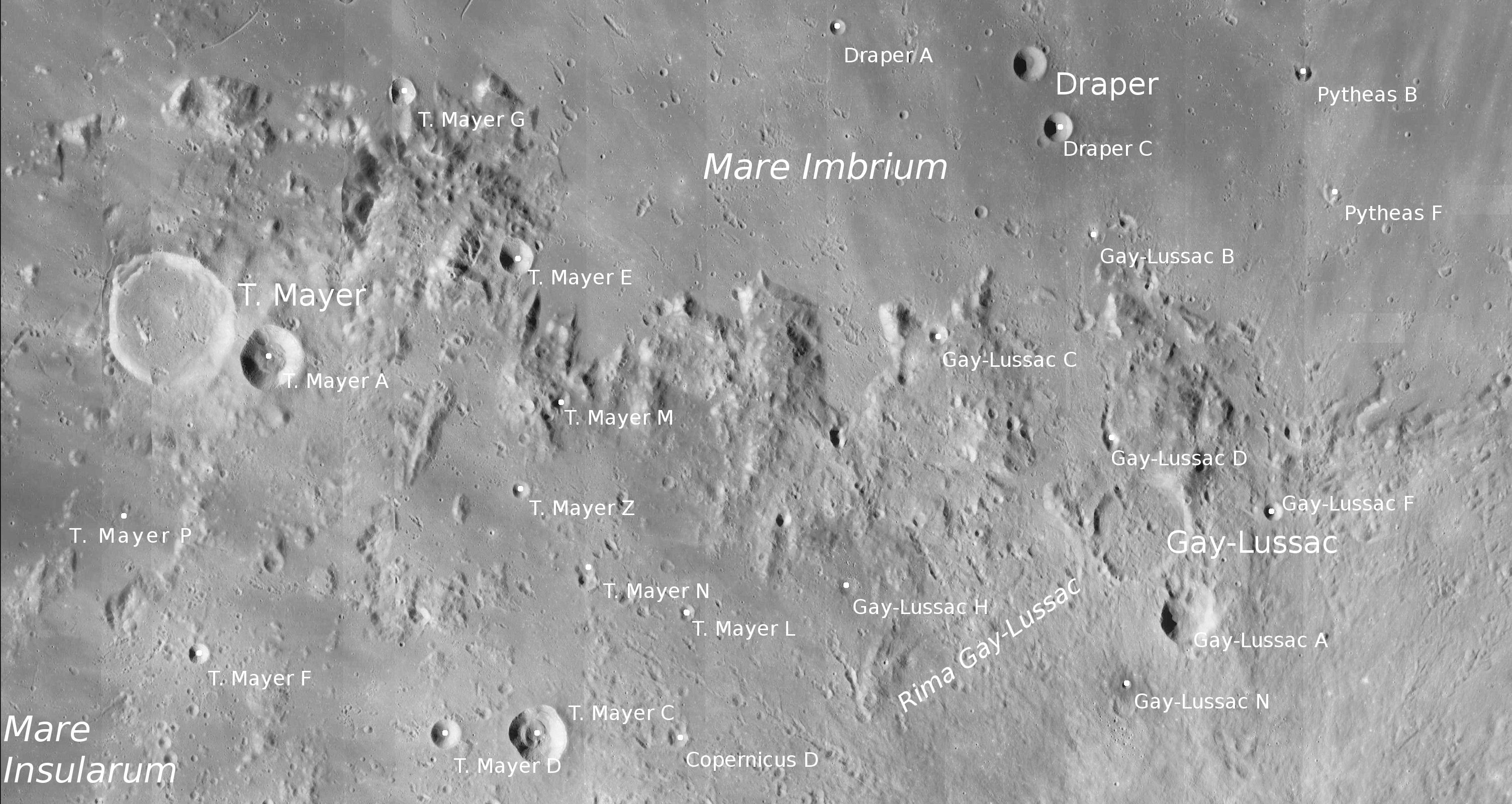
T. Mayer and its surroundings

T. Mayer, or Tobias Mayer, is a lunar impact crater that is located at the western end of the Montes Carpatus mountain range along the southern edge of Mare Imbrium. It was named after German astronomer Tobias Mayer. Located to the west is the Oceanus Procellarum, and to the south is Mare Insularum. The crater is located a couple of hundred kilometers to the northwest of the prominent crater Copernicus.

The name T. Mayer was first given to this crater by Johann Hieronymus Schröter in 1802.

== Description ==
This crater is embedded within a region of rugged ridges and these are attached to the exterior of the rim, most notably along the east and northeast. The rim is generally circular with the bowl-shaped T. Mayer A attached to the exterior along the east-southeast. Within the interior is a level floor marked only by a few craterlets.

Due south of T. Mayer is a cluster of lunar domes, some of which have tiny craterlets at the summits. These domes are the result of volcanic activity.

== Satellite craters ==
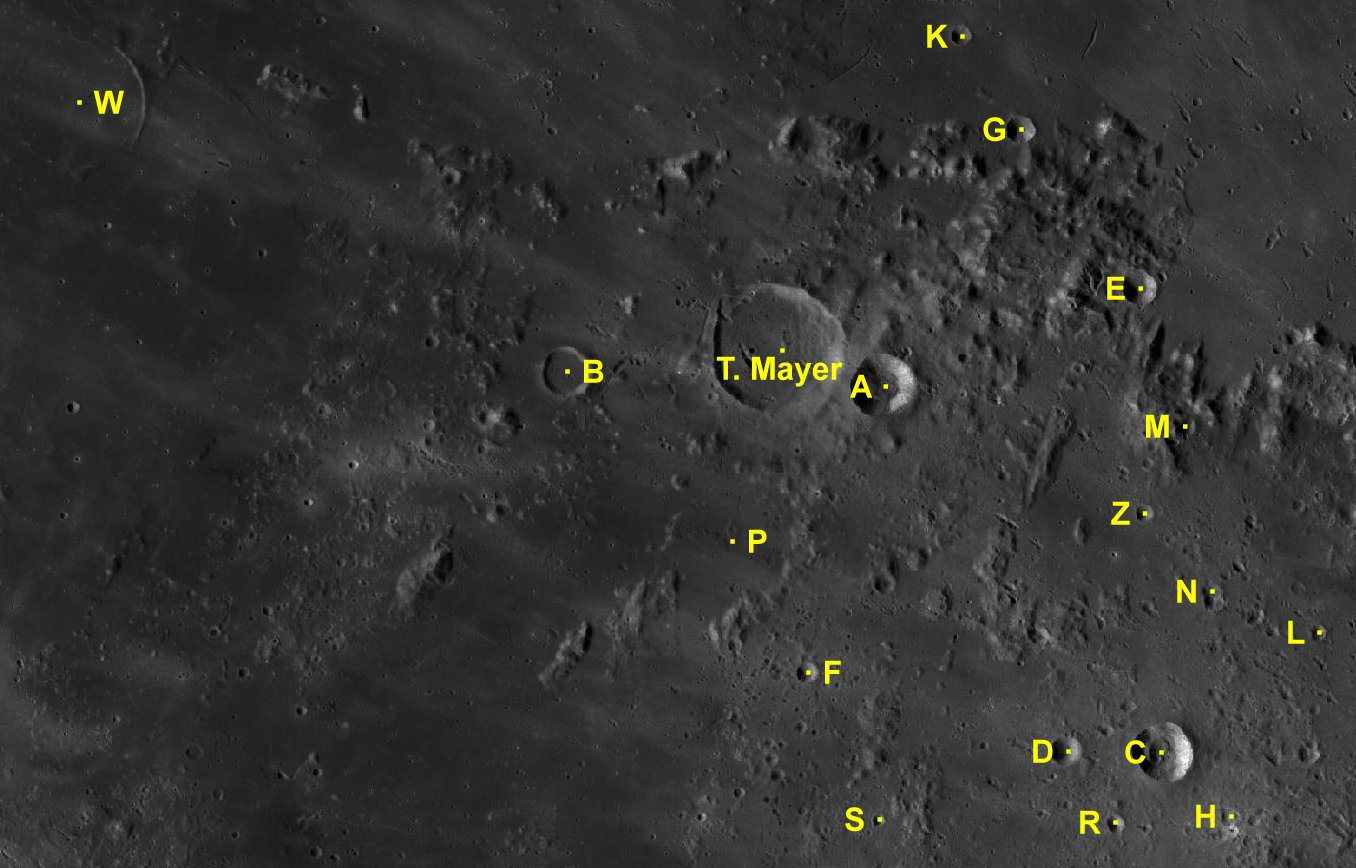
T. Mayer and its satellite craters

By convention these features are identified on lunar maps by placing the letter on the side of the crater midpoint that is closest to T. Mayer.

T. Mayer	Latitude	Longitude	Diameter
A	15.3° N	28.3° W	16 km
B	15.4° N	30.9° W	13 km
C	12.2° N	26.0° W	15 km
D	12.2° N	26.8° W	8 km
E	16.1° N	26.2° W	9 km
F	12.9° N	28.9° W	6 km
G	17.3° N	27.1° W	7 km
H	11.7° N	25.5° W	3 km
K	18.1° N	27.6° W	5 km
L	13.2° N	24.7° W	4 km
M	14.9° N	25.6° W	5 km
N	13.5° N	25.6° W	5 km
P	14.0° N	29.5° W	35 km
R	11.6° N	26.4° W	5 km
S	11.7° N	28.3° W	3 km
W	17.5° N	34.9° W	34 km
Z	14.2° N	26.1° W	4 km

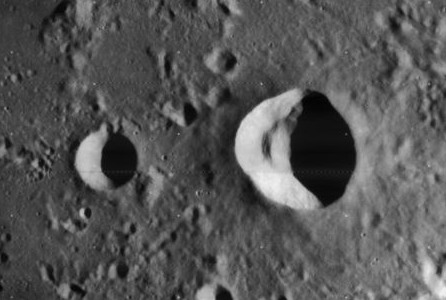
Lunar Orbiter 4 image of T. Mayer C (right) and T. Mayer D (left)

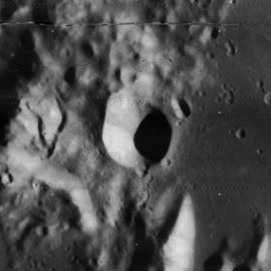
Lunar Orbiter 4 image of T. Mayer E
