= Gay-Lussac (disambiguation) =

Joseph Louis Gay-Lussac (1778–1850) was a French chemist and physicist.

Gay-Lussac may also refer to:

== Astronomy ==
- Gay-Lussac (crater)
- 11969 Gay-Lussac

== Chemistry ==
- Gay-Lussac's law
- Gay-Lussac number ($G_c$)
- Gay-Lussac scale

== Other uses ==
- Gaylussacia
- Gay-Lussac–Humboldt Prize
- French submarine Gay-Lussac (Q69, 1910)
- Fédération Gay-Lussac (FGL)
- Lycée Gay-Lussac
