= Tobias Mayer =

18th-century German astronomer (1723–1762)

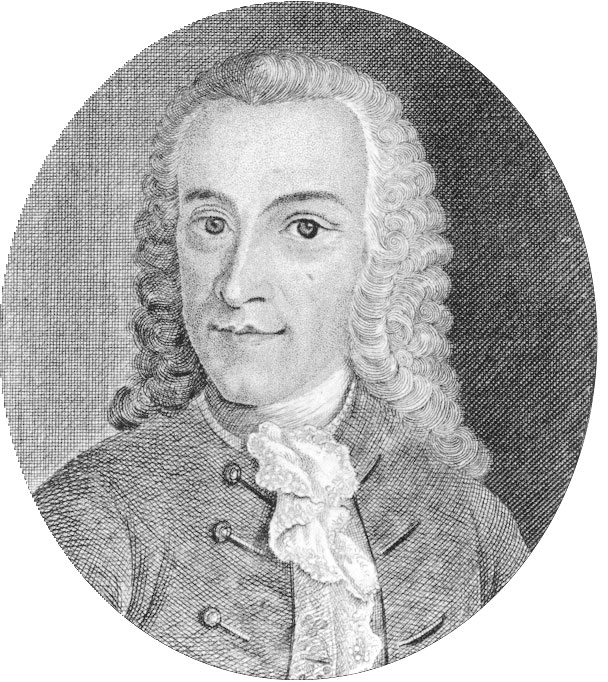
- Born: 17 February 1723; Marbach am Neckar
- Died: 20 February 1762 (aged 39); Göttingen
- Scientific career
- Fields: Astronomy

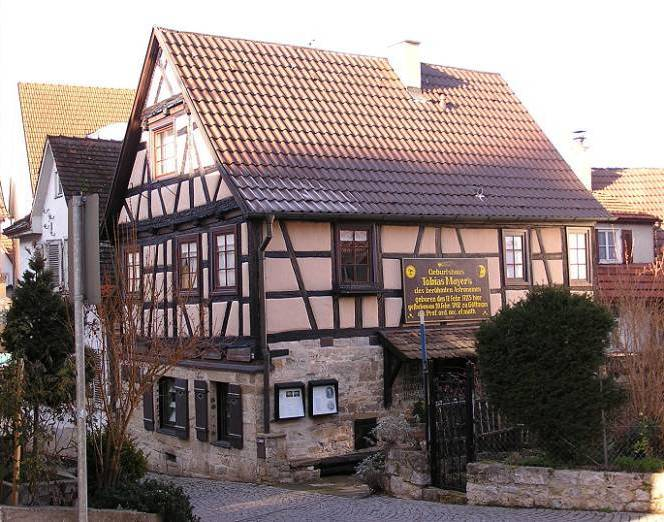
Birthplace of Tobias Mayer

Tobias Mayer (17 February 1723 – 20 February 1762) was a German astronomer famous for his studies of the Moon.

He was born at Marbach, in Württemberg, and brought up at Esslingen in poor circumstances. A self-taught mathematician, he earned a living by teaching mathematics while still a youth. He had already published two original geometrical works when, in 1746, he entered J. B. Homann's cartographic establishment at Nuremberg. Here he introduced many improvements in mapmaking, and gained a scientific reputation which led (in 1751) to his election to the chair of economy and mathematics at the University of Göttingen. In 1754 he became superintendent of the observatory, where he worked until his death in 1762. He has been credited with developing an early form of linear regression in 1750, though 50 years earlier Isaac Newton had used similar methods.

== Career ==
Mayer's first important astronomical work was a careful investigation of the libration of the Moon (Kosmographische Nachrichten, Nuremberg, 1750), and his chart of the full moon (published in 1775) was unsurpassed for half a century. But his fame rests chiefly on his lunar tables, communicated in 1752, with new solar tables to the Königliche Gesellschaft der Wissenschaften zu Göttingen (Royal Society of Sciences at Göttingen), and published in their transactions. Leonard Euler recommended him for a post at the Imperial Russian Academy of Sciences in 1754, although this appointment did not in the end take place. In 1755 he submitted to the British government an amended body of manuscript tables, which James Bradley compared with the Greenwich observations. He found these to be sufficiently accurate to determine the Moon's position to 75", and consequently the longitude at sea to about half a degree. An improved set was later published in London (1770), as also the theory (Theoria lunae juxta systema Newtonianum, 1767) upon which the tables are based. His widow, with whom they were sent to England, received in consideration from the British government a grant of £3,000 (equivalent to £473,000 in 2025). Appended to the London edition of the solar and lunar tables are two short tracts, one on determining longitude by lunar distances, together with a description of the reflecting circle (invented by Mayer in 1752), the other on a formula for atmospheric refraction, which applies a remarkably accurate correction for temperature.

During his work on the Moon in 1750, Mayer also used an averaging method for a set of data, seen as an early form of linear regression, if not its start. However, it has been discovered that Isaac Newton had used similar methods 50 years prior, as he not only performed an averaging of a set of data, but also adjusted the results so that the total of the deviations (residuals) equaled zero, ensuring that the regression line went through the average point of the data, along with recognizing the differences between two uneven datasets and may have considered an ideal solution regarding bias, although not in terms of efficiency.

== Legacy ==
Mayer left behind him a considerable quantity of manuscript material, part of which was collected by G. C. Lichtenberg and published in one volume (Opera inedita, Göttingen, 1775). It contains an easy and accurate method for calculating eclipses, an essay on colour, in which three primary colours are recognized, a catalogue of 998 zodiacal stars, and a memoir, the earliest of any real value, on the proper motion of eighty stars, originally communicated to the Göttingen Royal Society in 1760. The remaining manuscripts included papers on atmospheric refraction from 1755, on the motion of Mars as affected by the perturbations of Jupiter and the Earth (1756), and on terrestrial magnetism (1760 and 1762). In these last Mayer sought to explain the magnetic action of the Earth by a modification of Euler's hypothesis, and made the first really definite attempt to establish a mathematical theory of magnetic action (C. Hansteen, Magnetismus der Erde, I, 283). In 1881 Ernst Klinkerfues published photo-lithographic reproductions of Mayer's local charts and general map of the Moon. His star catalogue was re-edited by Francis Baily in 1830 (Memoirs of the Royal Astronomical Society IV, 391) and by Arthur Auwers in 1894.

Honors: Lunar crater T. Mayer (Southwest of crater Copernicus).

== Family ==
His son Johann Tobias Mayer became a noted German physicist.
