= Montes Carpatus =

Mountain range on the Moon

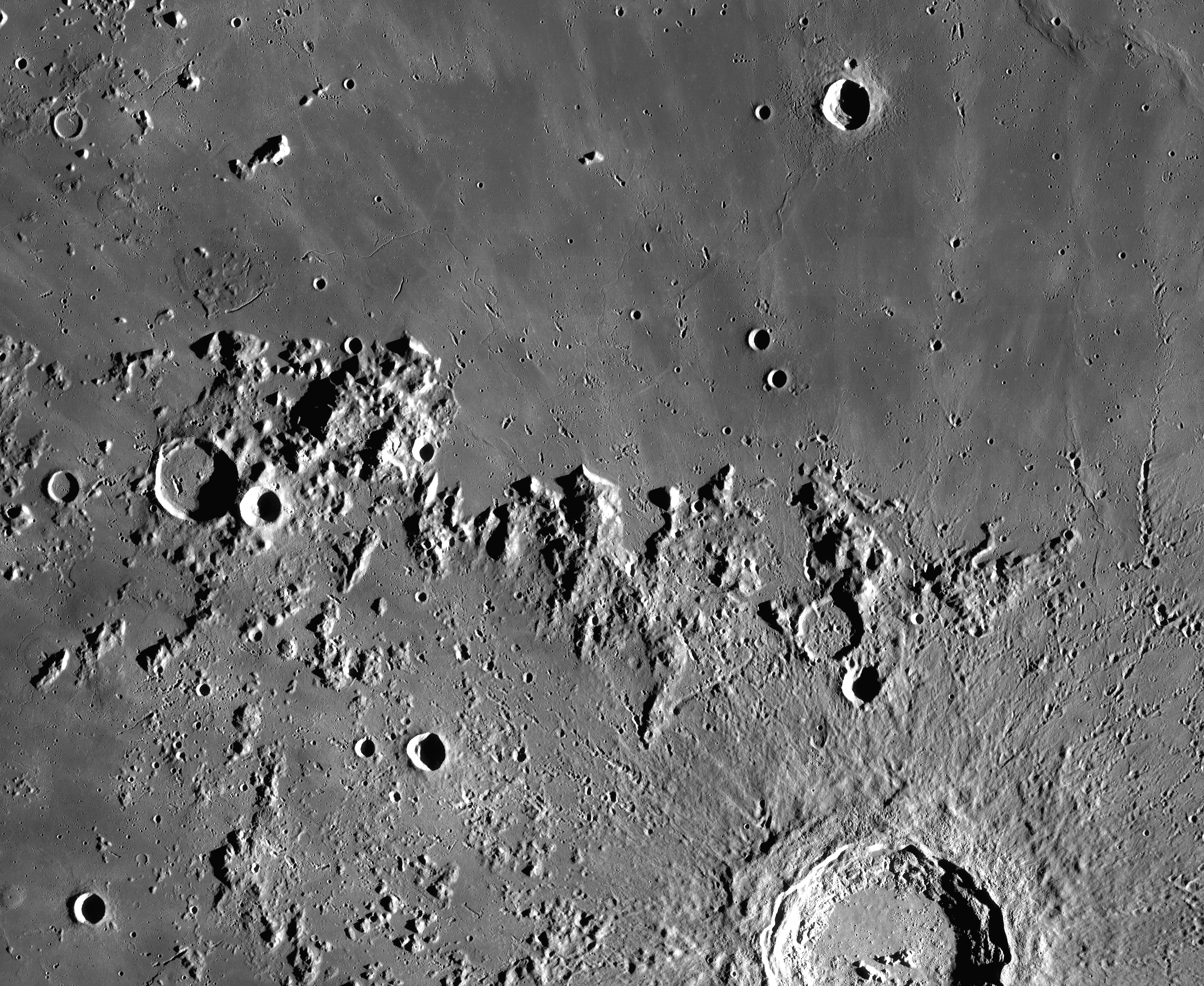
- LRO image of Montes Carpatus

Highest point
- Listing: Lunar mountains
- Coordinates: 14.5°N 24.4°W

Geography
- Location: the Moon

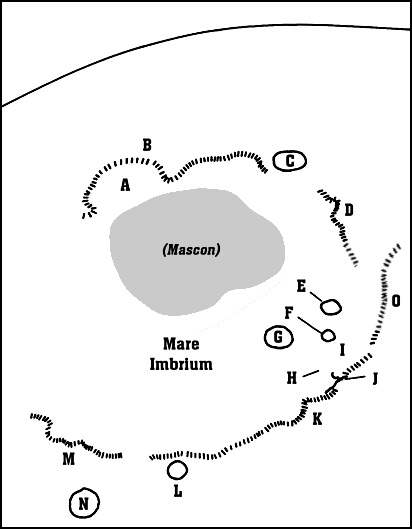
Detail map of Mare Imbrium's features. Montes Carpatus is marked "M".

Montes Carpatus is a mountain range that forms the southern edge of the Mare Imbrium on the Moon. The selenographic coordinates of this range are 14.5° N, 24.4° W, and the formation has an overall diameter of 361 km (224 mi). They were named by astronomer Johann Heinrich von Mädler after the Carpathian Mountains in Central Europe.

== Description ==
This rugged range generally stretches from west to east. Its western end starts near the crater T. Mayer, with a few low ridges curving northwards towards Euler crater. At the eastern extreme, there is a wide gap where Mare Imbrium in the north meets Mare Insularum to the south. East of this gap, the Montes Apenninus, forming another mountainous range that curves towards the northeast.

Most of this range consists of a series of peaks and rises, separated by valleys that have been penetrated by lava flows. None of the peaks have received individual names, unless one includes Mons Vinogradov to the west of the crater Euler. The surface to the north of the range is nearly level lunar mare, broken only by the occasional wrinkle ridge or minor impact crater.

The region south of the range is somewhat rougher, although still covered by lava flows. About 100 kilometers south of the mountains is the well-known ray crater Copernicus, and the irregular outer ramparts of this crater stretch almost to the foothills of the Carpatus range. Also of note is the smaller crater Gay-Lussac, which is attached to the southern part of the range.

== Volcanic history ==
Montes Carpatus contains a variety of volcanic landforms: lava flows, pyroclastic deposits, rilles, and others. Lavas are formed as the mantle begins to melt, so by sampling volcanic rocks of various ages from regions across the Moon, scientists can reconstruct the range of compositions and processes over time. The Montes Carpatus formed as a result of the giant impact that formed the Imbrium basin, and the mountains are actually the raised rim of the basin itself.

== See also ==
- List of mountains on the Moon
