= Sinus Aestuum =

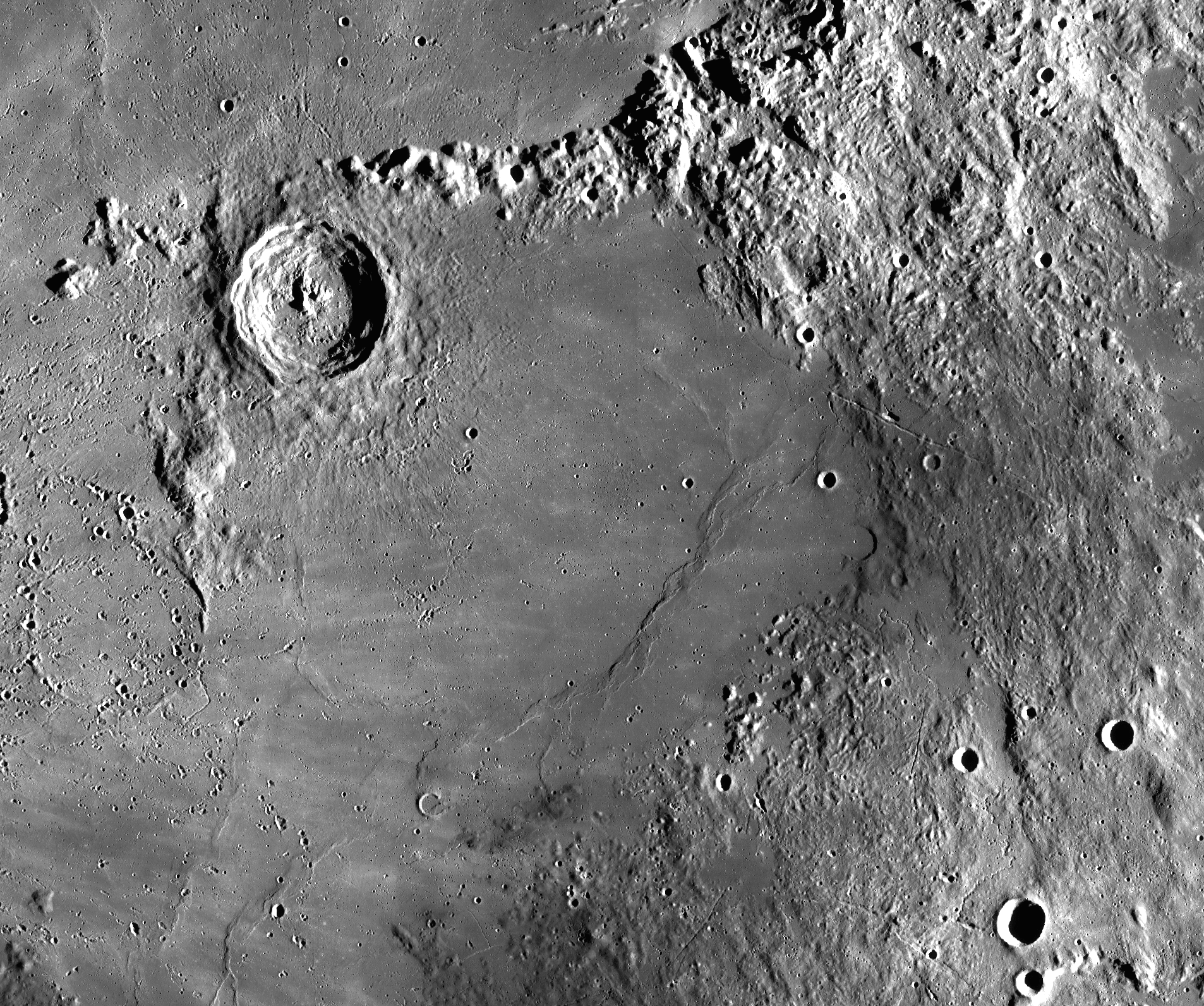
- Coordinates: 12.1°N 8.3°W
- Diameter: 290 km
- Eponym: Seething Bay

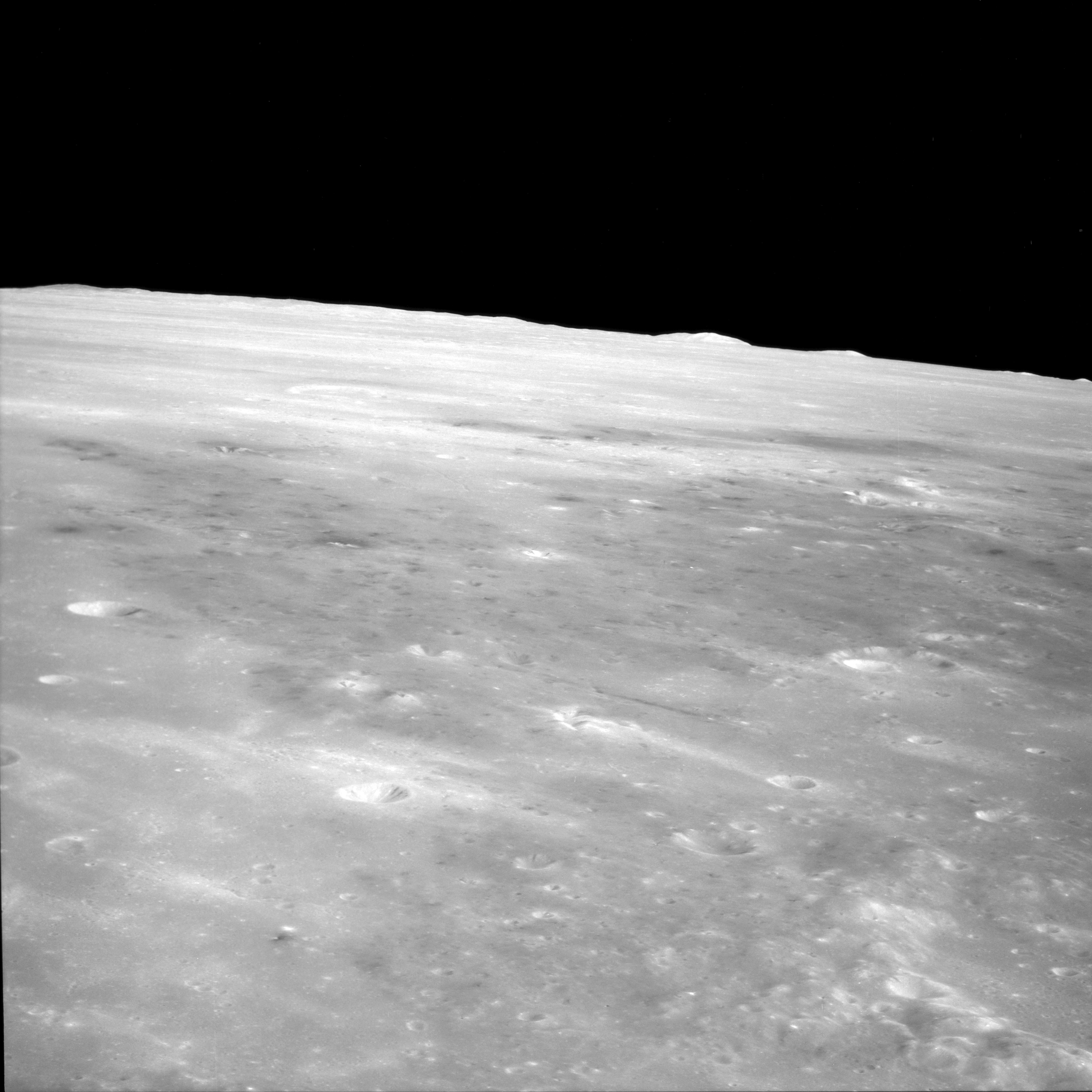
Oblique view of low-albedo features in southern Sinus Aestuum, thought to be volcanic in nature

Sinus Aestuum /ˈsaɪnəs ˈɛstjuːəm/ (Latin sinus aestuum "Seething Bay") forms a northeastern extension to Mare Insularum. It is centered at selenographic coordinates 12.1° N, 8.3° W, and it lies within a diameter of about 320 km.

The Sinus Aestuum is a level, nearly featureless surface of low albedo basaltic lava that is marked by a few small impacts and some wrinkle ridges. The eastern border is formed by an area of irregular terrain that divides the bay from the Mare Vaporum to the east. To the north is the Montes Apenninus range and the prominent crater Eratosthenes. Along the western side is the flooded crater Stadius and the Mare Insularum to the southwest.

== See also ==
- Volcanism on the Moon
