= Johannes Stadius =

Flemish astronomer, astrologer and mathematician (1527–1579)

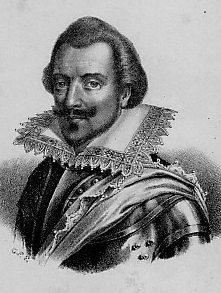
Johannes Stadius.

Johannes Stadius or Estadius (Dutch: Jan Van Ostaeyen; French: Jean Stade) (ca. 1 May 1527 – 17 June 1579), was a Flemish astronomer, astrologer, and mathematician. He was one of the important late 16th-century makers of ephemerides, which gave the positions of astronomical objects in the sky at a given time or times.

== Life ==
Born Jan Van Ostaeyen on 1 May 1527 in the town of Loenhout (Loennouthesius, meaning 'from Loenhout', is sometimes appended to his Latin surname) in the Duchy of Brabant, Stadius grew up in the Schaliënhuis on the old Dorpsstraat, which was one of the oldest houses in Loenhout (today a tavern and restaurant). Not much else is known regarding his youth besides the fact that his parents were not married to each other.

After receiving his education at the Latin school of Brecht, Stadius studied mathematics, geography, and history at the Old University of Leuven, where one of his teachers was Gemma Frisius. After completing his studies, he became a professor of mathematics at his alma mater. In 1554 he left his home country and travelled to Turin, where he enjoyed the patronage of the powerful Duke of Savoy.

Stadius subsequently worked in Cologne, Brussels and Paris. In Paris, he debated with the trigonometrist Maurice Bressieu of Grenoble and made astrological predictions for the French court. In his Tabulae Bergenses (1560), Stadius calls himself both royal mathematician (of Philip II of Spain) and mathematician to the Duke of Savoy.

== Ephemerides ==
During his stay in Brussels Stadius published his first work, the Ephemerides novae et auctae, first published by the publisher Arnold Birckmann of Cologne in 1554. An ephemeris (plural: ephemerides) (from the Greek word ephemeros, "daily") was, traditionally, a table providing the positions (given in a Cartesian coordinate system, or in right ascension and declination or, for astrologers, in longitude along the zodiacal ecliptic), of the Sun, the Moon, and the planets in the sky at a given moment in time; the astrological positions are usually given for either noon or midnight depending on the particular ephemeris that is used.

This work posited a link between mathematics and medicine and was influential on Tycho Brahe and Nostradamus. Stadius had been encouraged to publish the Ephemerides by his old teacher Gemma Frisius. Frisius had in a letter written in 1555 urged Stadius not to be afraid of being accused of believing in a moving earth and a stationary sun (i.e. the theory of Copernicus) or of abandoning the medieval Alfonsine Tables in favor of his own observations. In this letter Frisius further wrote that the system devised by Copernicus gave a better understanding of planetary distances, as well as of certain features of retrograde motion. Frisius' letter was published in several editions of the Ephemerides. The 1556 edition (Cologne) Ephemerides novae et exactae Ioannis Stadii Leonnovthesii ab anno 1554. ad annum 1570. ... can be consulted online via KU Leuven Special Collections.

== Death and legacy ==
Stadius died on 17 June 1579, in Paris, where he is buried. The inscription on his epitaph states that he died on 17 June 1579 and that he had lived for nearly 52 years and 2 months. Stadius' estimated birth date of 1 May 1527 is based on this inscription.

The lunar crater Stadius is named after Stadius.
