= Philippe van Lansberge =

Flemish Minister, astronomer and Mathematician

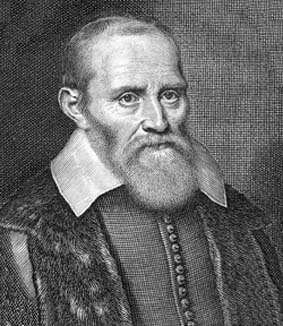
Philippe van Lansberge

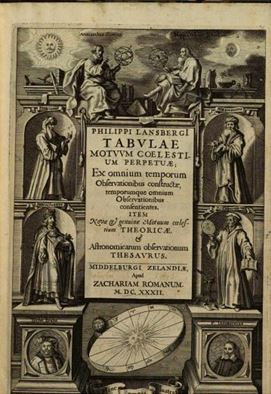
Title page of Lansberge's Tabulae Motuum coelestium perpetua

Johan Philip Lansberge (25 August 1561 – 8 December 1632) was a Flemish Calvinist Minister, astronomer and Mathematician. His name is sometimes written Lansberg, and his first name is sometimes given as Philip or Johannes Philippus. He published under the Latin name Philippus Lansbergius.

He is best known as the author of a set of astronomical tables, Tabulae motuum coelestium perpetuæ, for predicting planetary positions. These were later found to contain certain errors, in part because he (erroneously) did not accept Kepler's discovery of elliptical orbits. He served as a Protestant clergyman.

Martinus Hortensius was one of his students, and Landsberge subsequently collaborated with his former pupil.

He was born in Ghent in modern-day Belgium in 1561. He grew up in France and studied in England. After the Fall of Antwerp in 1585, he moved to the northern part of the Netherlands. He stayed in Leiden for a short time, and then he went to Goes to become a preacher. Lansbergen lived there until 1613. In that year, he was fired because he did not agree with a mayoral election. The fifty-two-year-old Lansbergen decided to move to Middelburg to devote himself to astronomical research, which he did until the end of his life.

Lansbergen supported the heliocentric theory of Copernicus, who claimed that the Earth revolves around the Sun. This theory was controversial in both Catholic and Protestant circles, where the geocentric theory had been more widely held.

He married Sara Lievaerts in 1586 and they had six sons and four daughters. He had a great reputation, because of his rare knowledge and expertise. Not only in matters of the church, but even more in mathematics and physics. In 1611, his son Pieter (1587) became a preacher in Goes. Jacob, another son, moved to Goes as well, but became a medical doctor. Lansbergens' oldest son, also called Philippus, was a preacher in Kloetinge and died there in 1647.

Lansbergen wrote several books. One of those, "Considerations about the daily and yearly movements of the Earth", became a best-seller. One could say that Lansbergen was the first Dutch author that wrote a popular book about the movements of the planets around the Sun.

Kepler and Galileo, who lived in the same period, were very interested in the work of Lansbergen. Based on his tables, they could predict the movements of the planets more accurately.

Lansbergen probably lived in the "Spanjaardstraat" in Middelburg. He had frequent contacts with sympathizers, like the Dutch poet Jacob Cats. Cats wrote three poems about the "very wise, famous, and honored Philippus Lansbergen".

He died in Middelburg in December 1632.

The Philippus Lansbergen Public Observatory in Middleburg is named after him, and so is the lunar crater Lansberg.

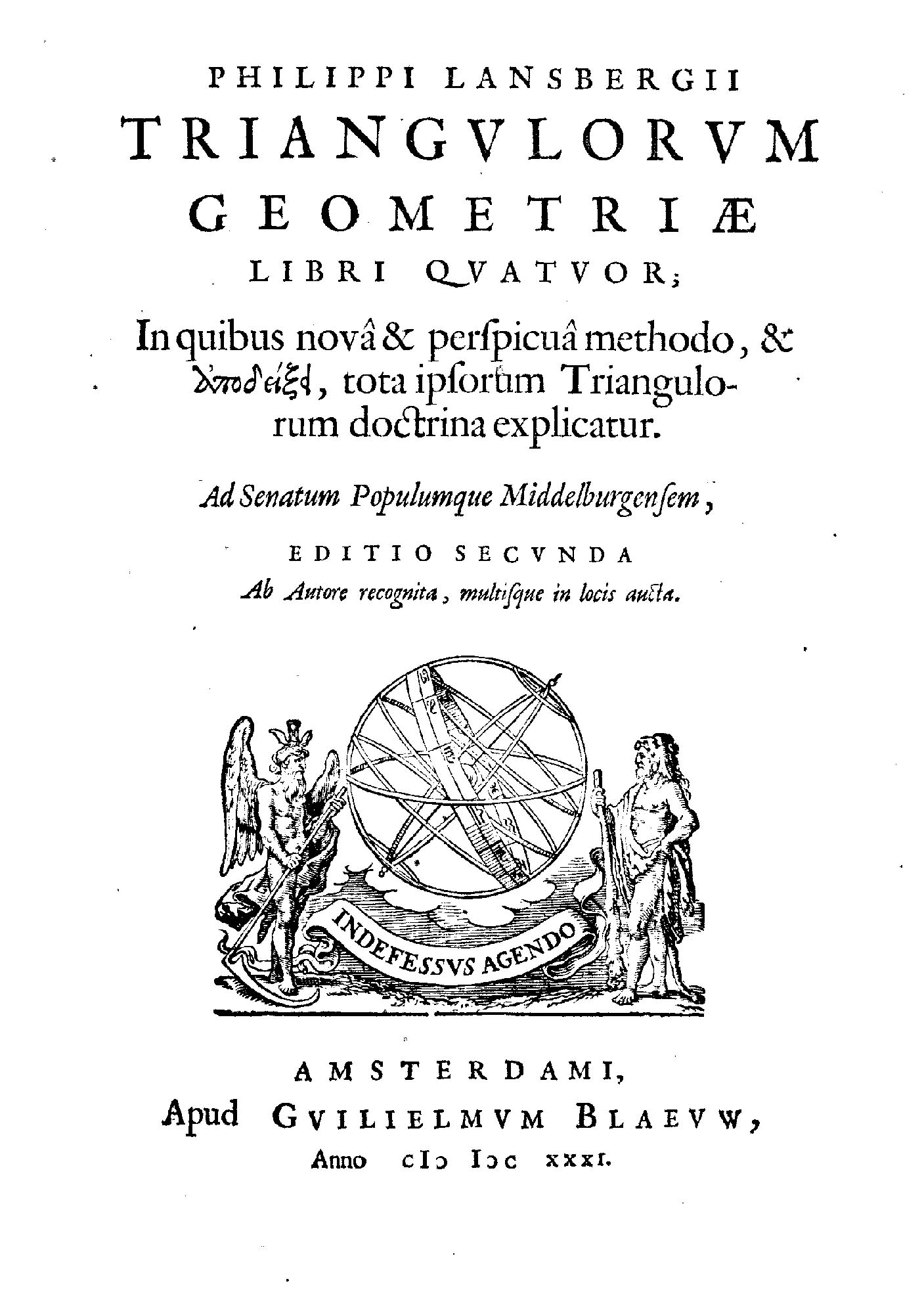
Triangulorum geometriae libri quatuor, 1631

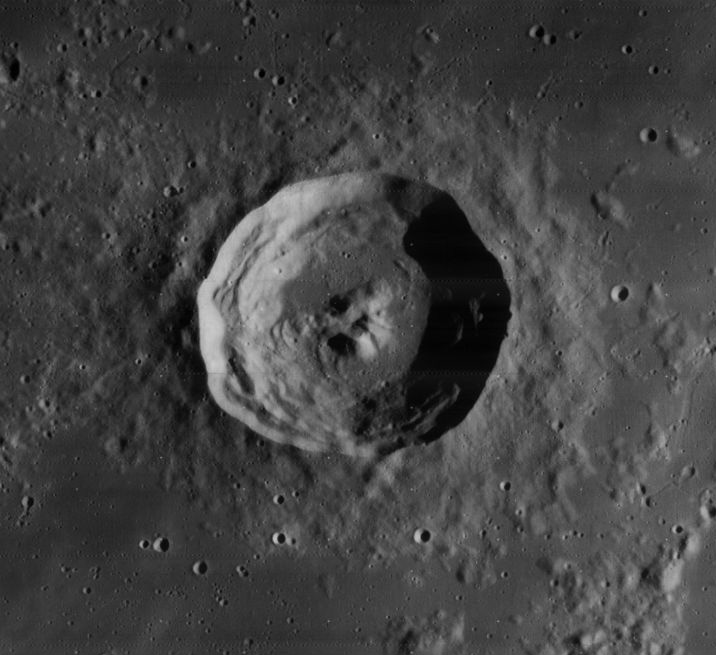
Lansberg crater, on the moon

== Works ==
- Progymnasmatum astronomiae restitutae. 1, De motu solis (in Latin). Middelburg: Zacharias Roman. 1628.
