= Gay-Lussac (crater) =

Crater on the Moon

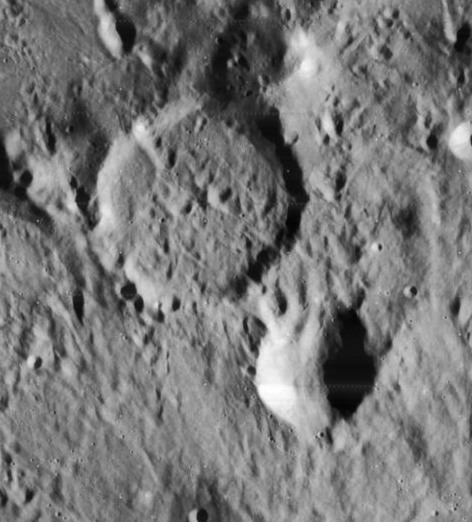
- Lunar Orbiter 4 image of Gay-Lussac (upper left) and Gay-Lussac A (lower right)
- Coordinates: 13.9°N 20.8°W
- Diameter: 26 km
- Depth: 0.8 km
- Colongitude: 21° at sunrise
- Eponym: Joseph L. Gay-Lussac

Gay-Lussac is a lunar impact crater located to the north of the prominent crater Copernicus, in the southern foothills of the Montes Carpatus range. The rim of the crater is slightly distorted, although generally circular. The inner floor is flat but rough, with no central peak. There are a pair of small craterlet depressions in the middle instead of a central peak. The associated crater Gay-Lussac A is nearly joined to the southeast rim.

The crater is named after French physicist Joseph Louis Gay-Lussac.

To the southwest is a wide rille named Rima Gay-Lussac. This is a nearly linear formation with curves at the end. It follows a 40-km-long line from the southwest to the northeast.

== Gay-Lussac N, north of Copernicus ==
Satellite crater Gay-Lussac N, north of Copernicus, is a dark halo craterlet. The darkness of the halo around Gay-Lussac N is also noticeable on the photographic version of chart LAC 58 (page 116) in The Clementine Atlas of the Moon (Ben Bussey / Paul D. Spudis).

== Satellite craters ==
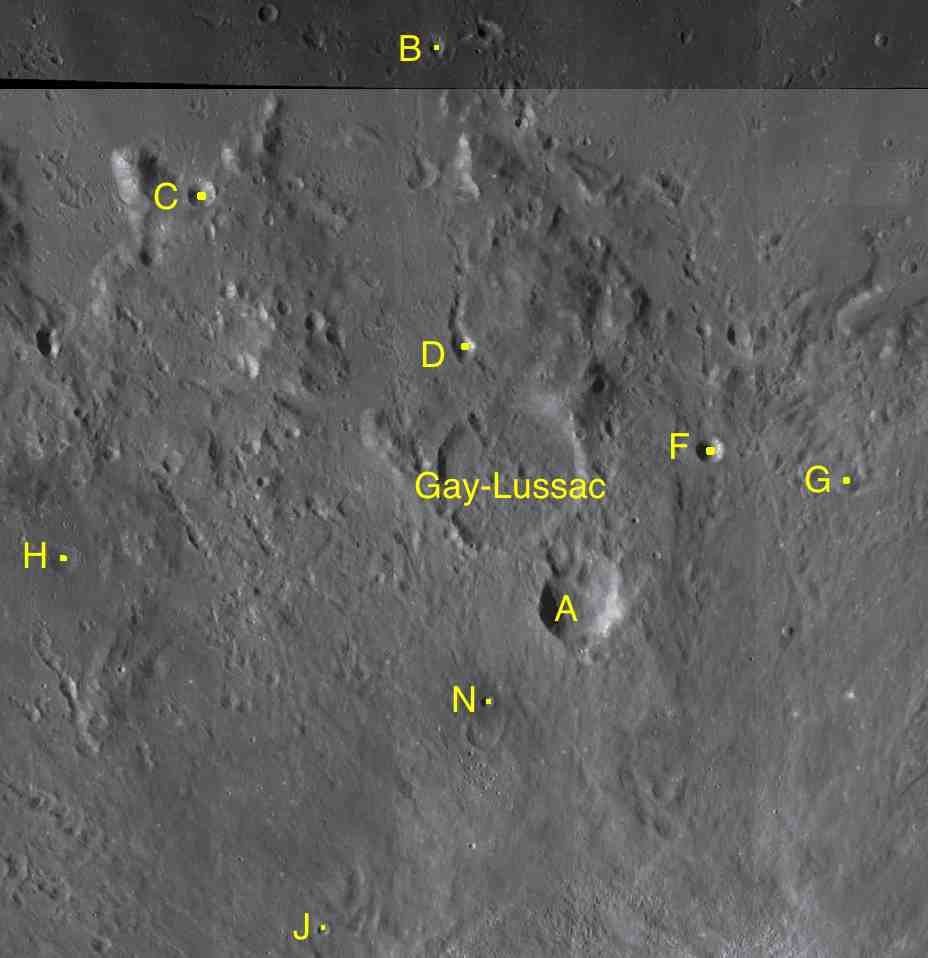
Gay-Lussac and its satellite craters

By convention these features are identified on lunar maps by placing the letter on the side of the crater midpoint that is closest to Gay-Lussac.

Gay-Lussac	Latitude	Longitude	Diameter
A	13.2° N	20.4° W	15 km
B	16.2° N	21.1° W	3 km
C	15.4° N	22.5° W	5 km
D	14.6° N	21.0° W	5 km
F	14.0° N	19.6° W	5 km
G	13.8° N	18.9° W	5 km
H	13.4° N	23.2° W	5 km
J	11.7° N	21.7° W	3 km
N	12.6° N	20.9° W	2 km
