= Lansberg (crater) =

Crater on the Moon

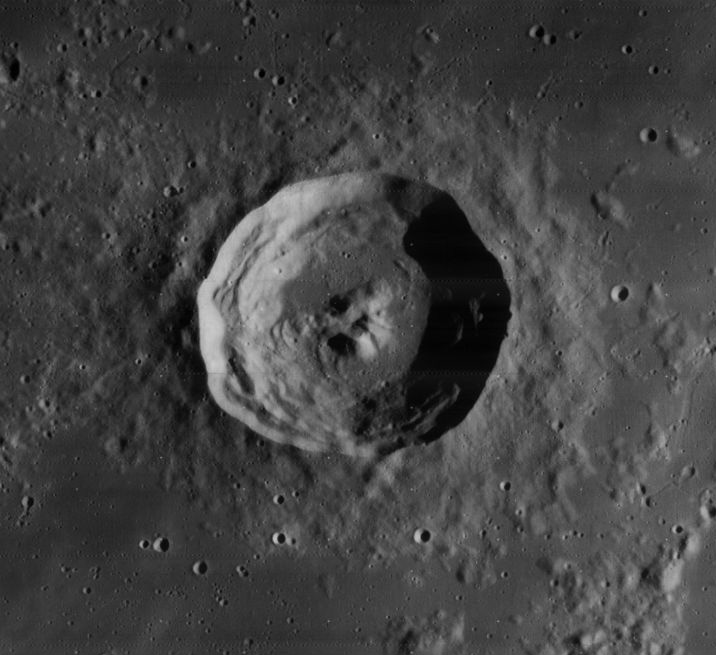
- Lunar Orbiter 4 image
- Coordinates: 0.3°S 26.6°W
- Diameter: 38.75 km (24.08 mi)
- Depth: 2.75 km
- Colongitude: 26° at sunrise
- Formation: Upper Imbrian
- Eponym: Philippe van Lansberge

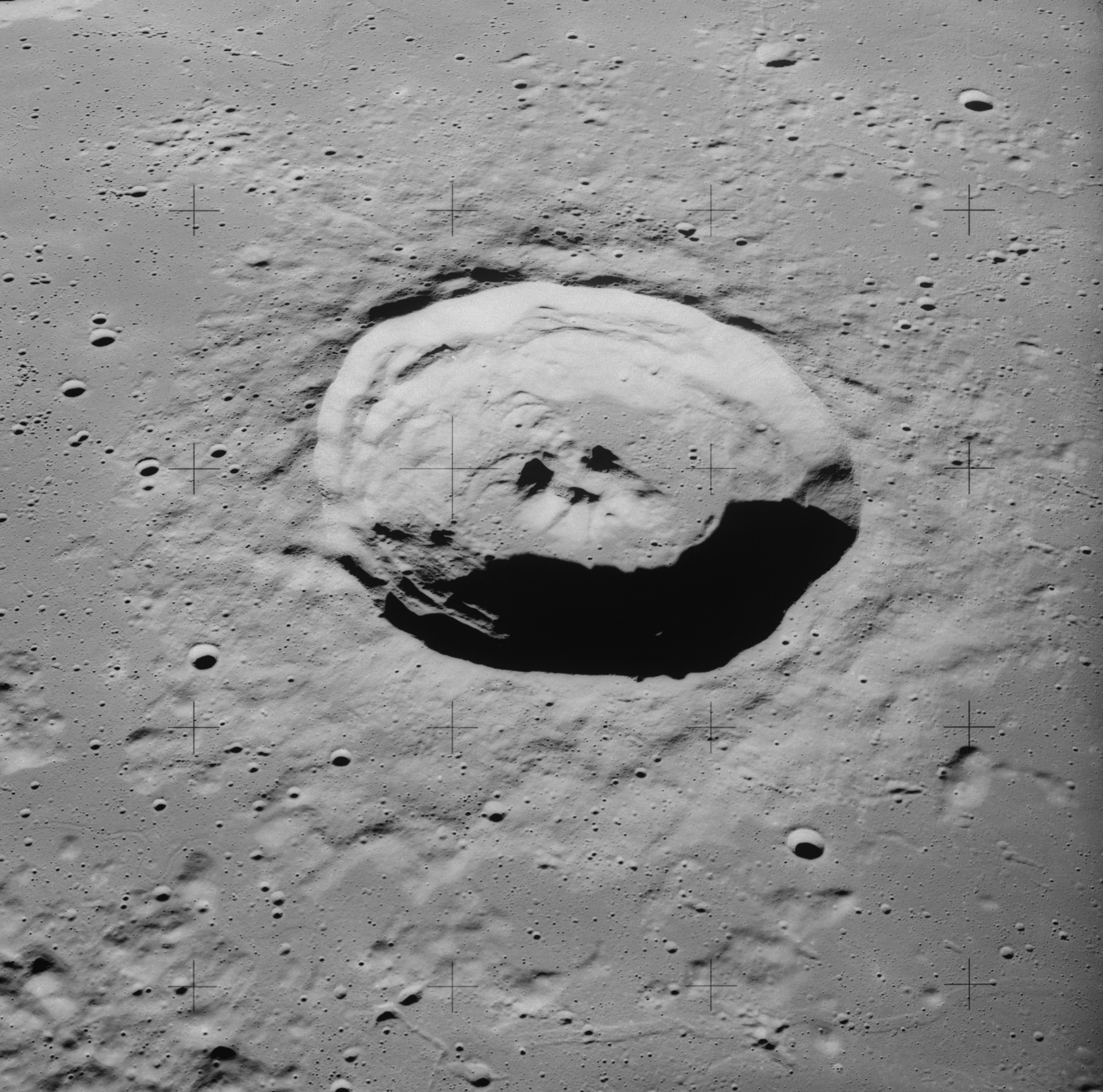
Oblique view facing west, from Apollo 14

Lansberg is a lunar impact crater on the Mare Insularum. Describing the rim, Thomas William Webb said that "it rises very gradually without, but is steep and terraced within".

On the lunar geologic timescale, Lansberg is a crater of Upper (Late) Imbrian age. The crater has a high rim and a central mountain. There are terraces along the inner walls, and the tops have slumped to produce a sharp edge. This formation is not noticeably eroded, and there are no significant impact craters within the interior.

The crater is correctly spelled "Lansberg", but has sometimes been written "Landsberg" instead. It is named for the Belgian/Dutch astronomer Philippe van Lansberge (1561-1632). This designation was formally adopted by the International Astronomical Union in 1935.

Approximately 40 km to the southeast of Lansberg is the landing site of the Luna 5 probe, and a further 60 km in the same direction is the landing site of Surveyor 3 and Apollo 12.

== Lansberg and environs during full moon ==
During full moon, almost nothing is detectable and recognizable of crater Lansberg. West-southwest of Lansberg, the triangle-shaped group of bright satellite craters Lansberg A, Lansberg B, and Lansberg D, is a guide to get to the location of Lansberg itself. In this triangle, bright craterlet Lansberg E could be seen as the fourth member of this group. Lansberg and its environs of bright satellite craters are also noticeable on the photographic versions of charts LAC 75 (page 150) and LAC 76 (page 152) in The Clementine Atlas of the Moon (Ben Bussey / Paul D. Spudis).

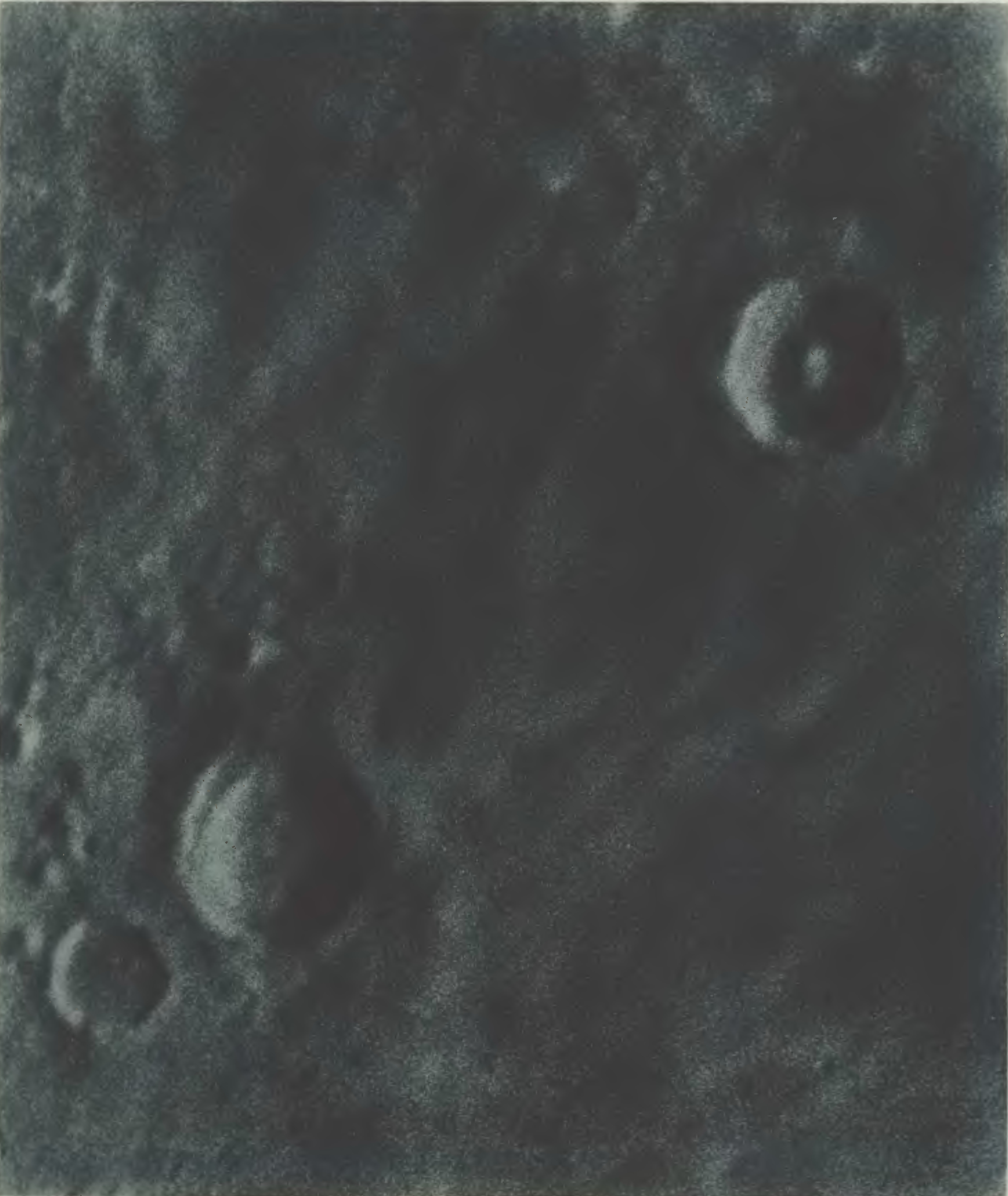
Weinek's Lunar Atlas (1899) page of Lansberg crater which is on the top right

== Satellite craters ==
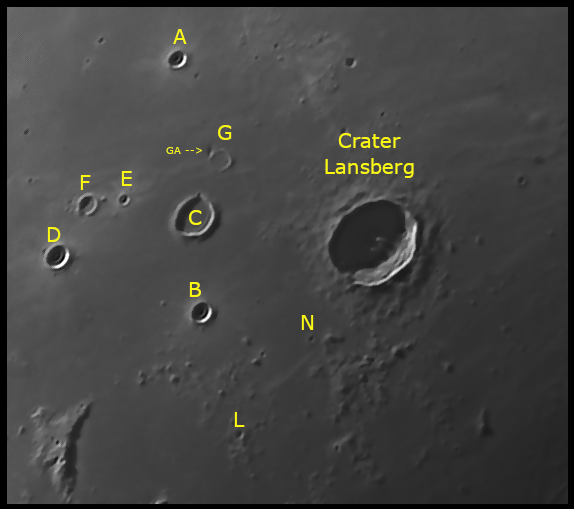
Lansberg Region Satellite Craters

By convention these features are identified on lunar maps by placing the letter on the side of the crater midpoint that is closest to Lansberg.

Lansberg	Latitude	Longitude	Diameter
A	0.2° N	31.1° W	9 km
B	2.5° S	28.1° W	9 km
C	1.5° S	29.2° W	17 km
D	3.0° S	30.6° W	11 km
E	1.8° S	30.3° W	6 km
F	2.2° S	30.7° W	9 km
G	0.6° S	29.4° W	10 km
L	3.5° S	26.4° W	5 km
N	1.9° S	26.4° W	4 km
P	2.3° S	23.0° W	2 km
X	1.2° N	27.8° W	3 km
Y	0.7° N	28.2° W	4 km
