= Copernicus (lunar crater) =

Prominent depression on the Moon

Lunar crater Copernicus
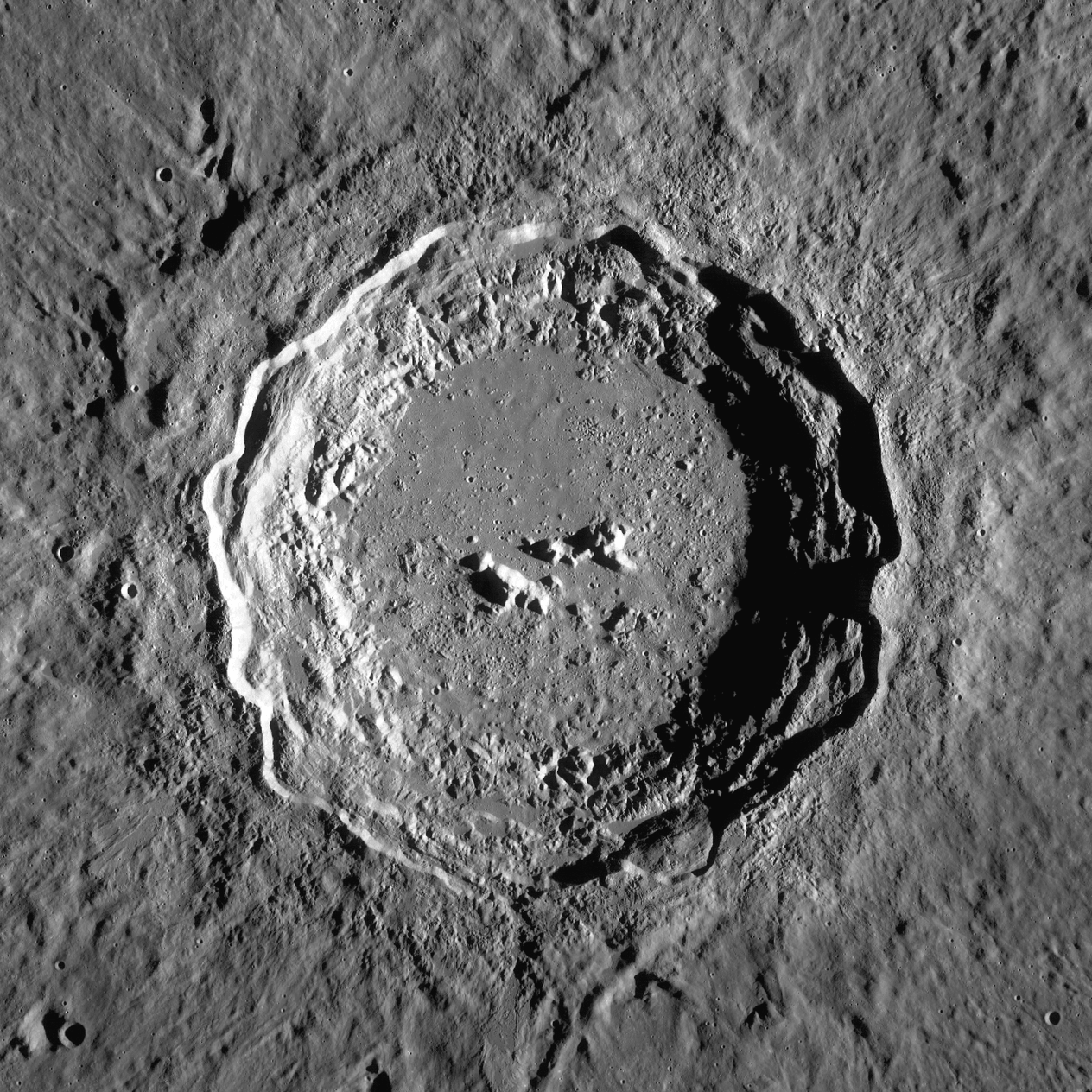
- Mosaic of Lunar Reconnaissance Orbiter images (rotate display if a crater illusion is seen due to the atypical position of the light source)
- Location: The Moon
- Coordinates: 9.62°N 20.08°W
- Diameter: c. 93 km
- Depth: c. 3.8 km
- Age: c. 800 million years
- Eponym: Nicolaus Copernicus

Copernicus is a lunar impact crater located in eastern Oceanus Procellarum. Thomas Webb describes it as "one of the grandest craters" with "a central mountain" and "a noble ring composed not only of terraces, but distinct heights separated by ravines". It was named after the astronomer Nicolaus Copernicus. It typifies craters that formed during the Copernican period in that it has a prominent ray system.

== Characteristics ==
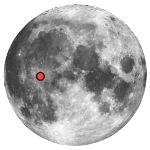
Location of Copernicus

Copernicus is visible using binoculars, and is located slightly northwest of the center of The Moon's Earth-facing hemisphere. It is also barely visible to the naked eye. South of the crater is the Mare Insularum, and to the south-south west is the crater Reinhold. North of Copernicus are the Montes Carpatus, which lie at the south edge of Mare Imbrium. West of Copernicus is a group of dispersed lunar hills.

Copernicus may have been created by debris from the breakup of the parent body of asteroid 495 Eulalia around 800 million years ago. Due to its relative youth, the crater has remained in a relatively pristine shape since it formed. The circular rim has a discernible hexagonal form, with a terraced inner wall and a 30 km wide, sloping rampart that descends nearly a kilometer to the surrounding mare. There are three distinct terraces visible, and arc-shaped landslides due to slumping of the inner wall as the crater debris subsided. The infrared spectrum of pure crystalline plagioclase has been identified on the north wall.

Most likely due to its recent formation, the crater floor has not been flooded by lava. The terrain along the bottom is hilly in the southern half while the north is relatively smooth. The central peaks consist of three isolated mountainous rises climbing as high as 1.2 km above the floor. These peaks are separated from each other by valleys, and they form a rough line along an east–west axis. Infrared observations of these peaks during the 1980s determined that olivine was the main mafic mineral.

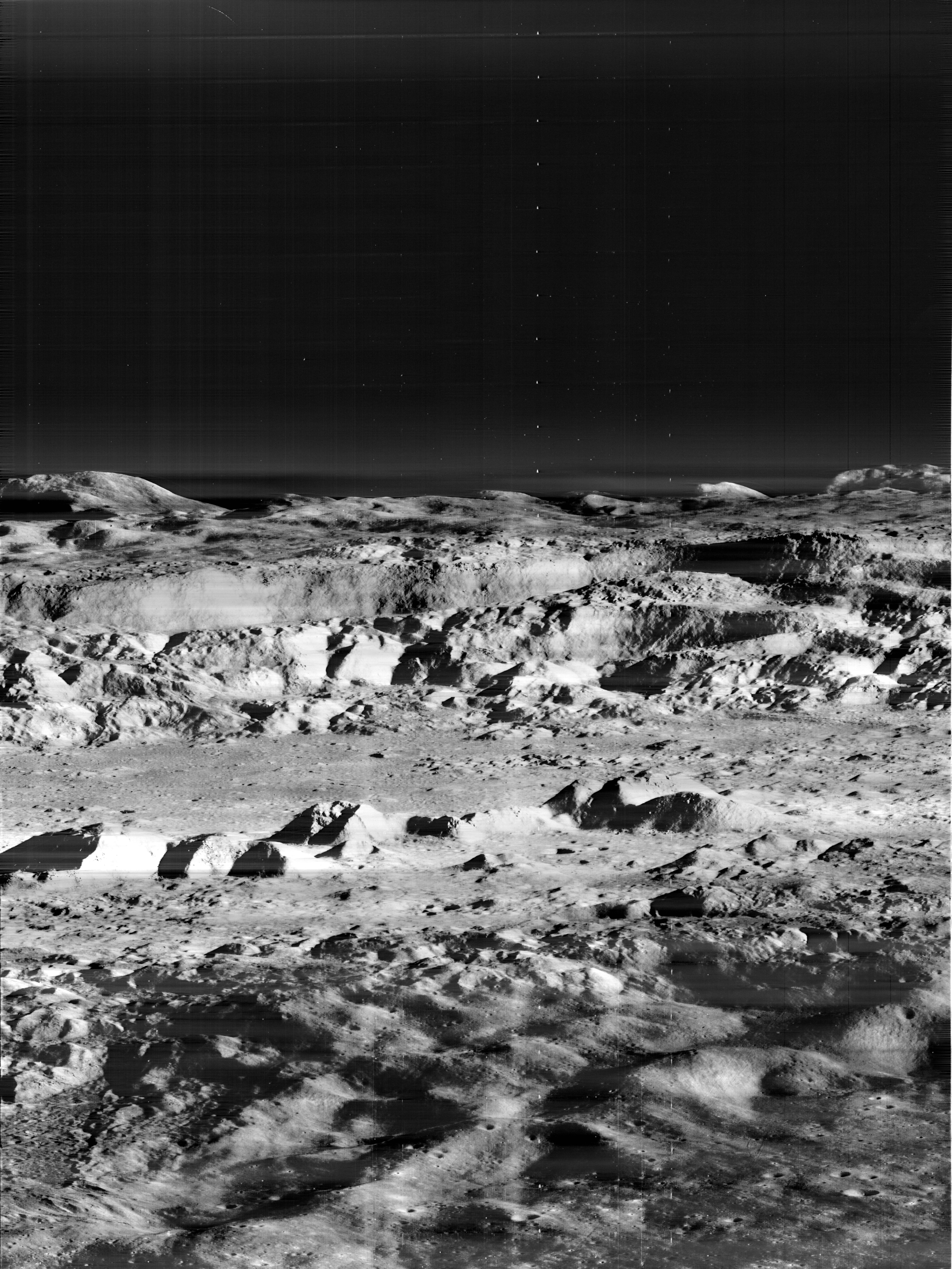
"Picture of the Century" – oblique view of the interior of Copernicus from Lunar Orbiter 2, which orbited The Moon from 1966 to 1967

Based on high-resolution images from Lunar Orbiter 5, Terry W. Offield of the U.S. Geological Survey described the crater as having,

...a hummocky crater rim, numerous large slump blocks on the crater wall, and a complex of central peaks. Sets of parallel fractures, aligned with the lunar structure grid, formed after the crater wall took its present form, but before the smoothest floor materials were emplaced. The smooth floor materials show a swirling pattern of cracks like those seen on terrestrial lava flows. These materials are associated with numerous hills that have summit craters and are probably small volcanoes. Several low places on the rim and wall are partly filled by what appears to be ponded volcanic material, or possibly fluidized impact debris.

The crater rays spread as far as 800 kilometers across the surrounding mare, overlying rays from the craters Aristarchus and Kepler. The rays are less distinct than the long, linear rays extending from Tycho, instead forming a nebulous pattern with plumy markings. In multiple locations the rays lie at glancing angles, instead of forming a true radial dispersal. An extensive pattern of smaller secondary craters can also be observed surrounding Copernicus, a detail that was depicted in a map by Giovanni Cassini in 1680. Some of these secondary craters form sinuous chains in the ejecta.

In 1966, the crater was photographed from an oblique angle by Lunar Orbiter 2 as one of 12 "housekeeping" pictures that were taken to advance the roll of film between possible astronaut landing sites being surveyed. At the time this detailed image of the lunar surface was termed by NASA scientist Martin Swetnick and subsequently quoted by Time magazine as "one of the great pictures of the century."

The Apollo 12 mission landed south of Copernicus on mare basalts of Oceanus Procellarum that were believed to have been in the path of one of the crater's rays, and scientists hoped cosmic ray exposure ages of soil samples would help constrain the crater age. The results were inconclusive, but not inconsistent with the estimated 800 million year age of crater formation. Copernicus itself was a possible landing site for the canceled Apollo 20 mission.

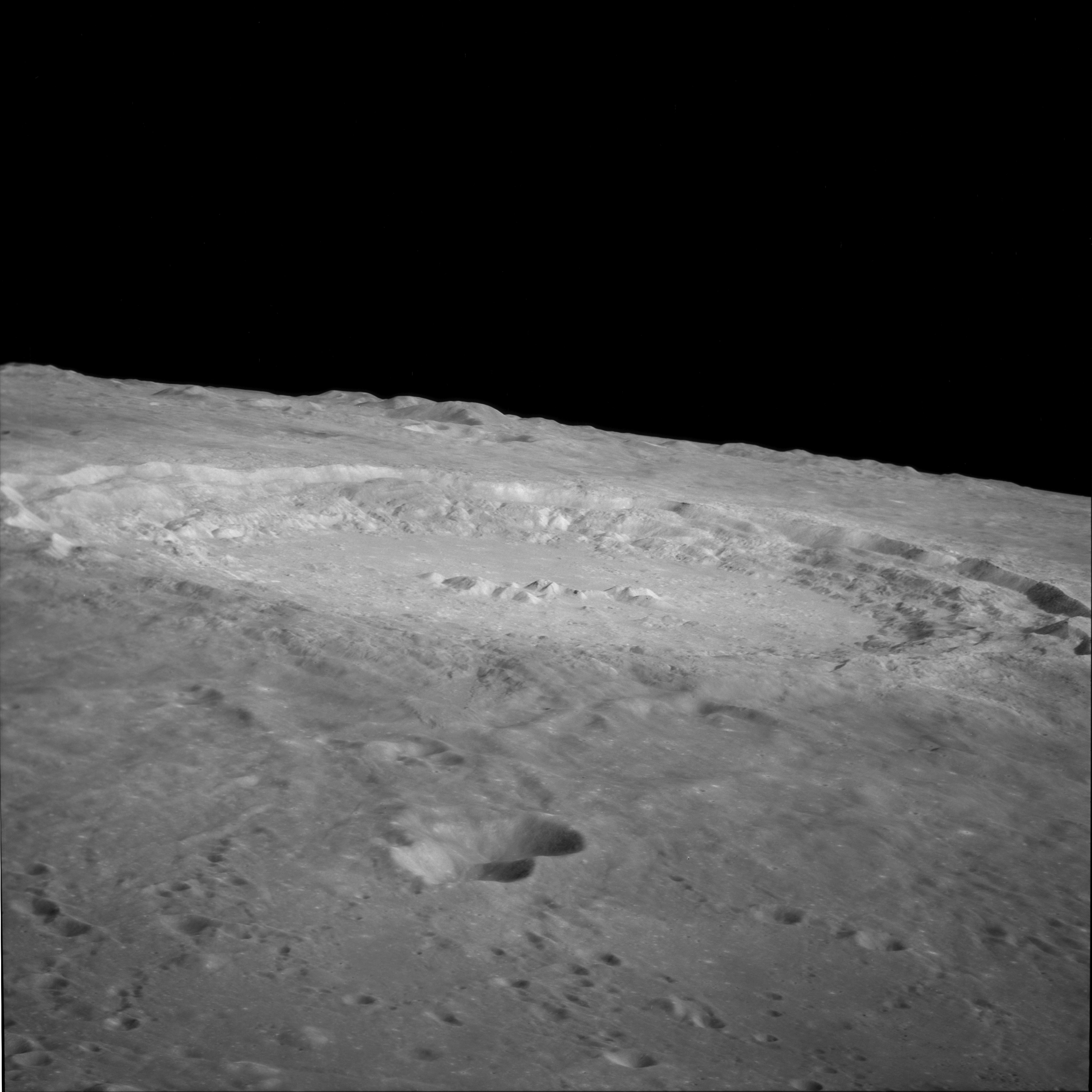
Copernicus from Apollo 12

== Names ==
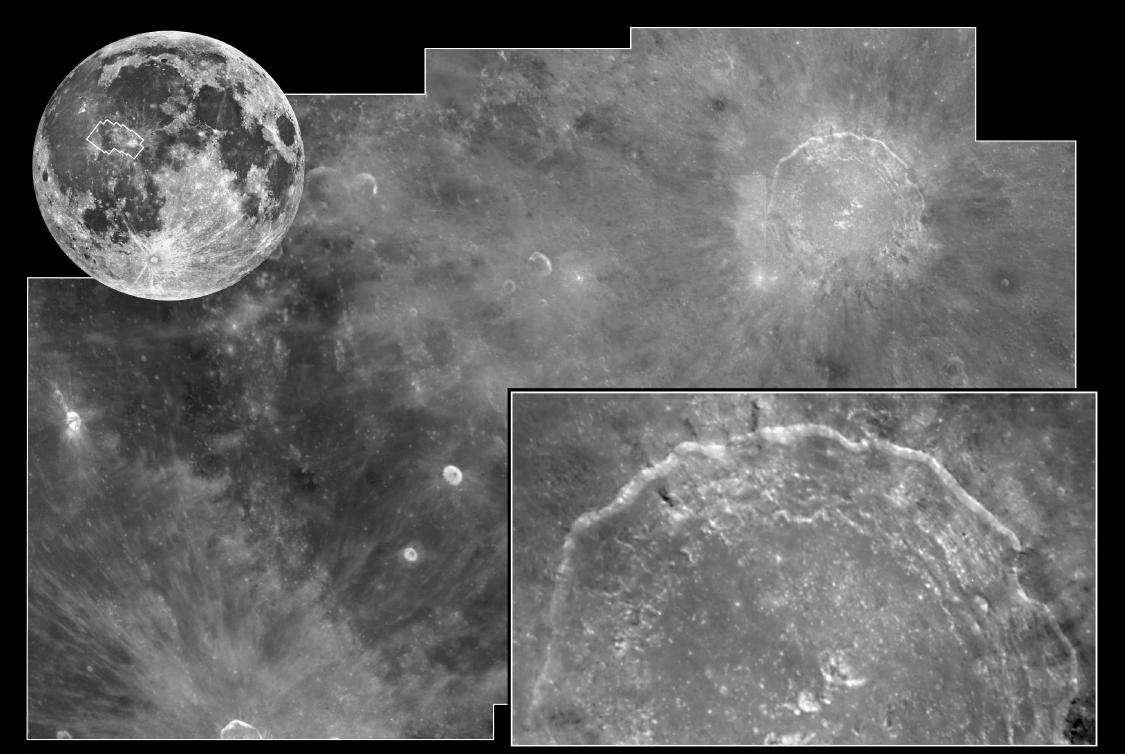
Telescopic views of Copernicus (inset), showing its location on the near side

Copernicus is named after the astronomer Nicolaus Copernicus. Like many of the craters on the Moon's near side, it was given its name by Giovanni Riccioli, whose 1651 nomenclature system has become standardized. Riccioli awarded Copernicus a prominent crater despite the fact that, as an Italian Jesuit, he conformed with church doctrine in publicly opposing Copernicus's heliocentric system. Riccioli justified the name by noting that he had symbolically thrown all the heliocentrist astronomers into the Ocean of Storms. However, astronomical historian Ewan Whitaker suspects that the prominence of Copernicus is a sign that Riccioli secretly supported the heliocentric system and was ensuring that Nicolaus Copernicus would receive a worthy legacy for future generations.

Earlier lunar cartographers had given the feature different names. Pierre Gassendi named it Carthusia after the Chartreuse Mountains. Michael Langren's 1645 map calls it "Phillipi IV" after Philip IV of Spain. And Johannes Hevelius named it 'Etna M.' after Mount Etna.

Later the crater was nicknamed "the Monarch of the Moon" by lunar cartographer Thomas Elger.

== Bright companion of Copernicus during full moon ==
A small bright unnamed craterlet immediately west of Copernicus is noticeable during full moon. It was also photographed by the Clementine probe in 1994 and is seen on the photographic version of chart LAC 58 (page 116) in The Clementine Atlas of the Moon (Ben Bussey / Paul D. Spudis).

== Satellite craters ==
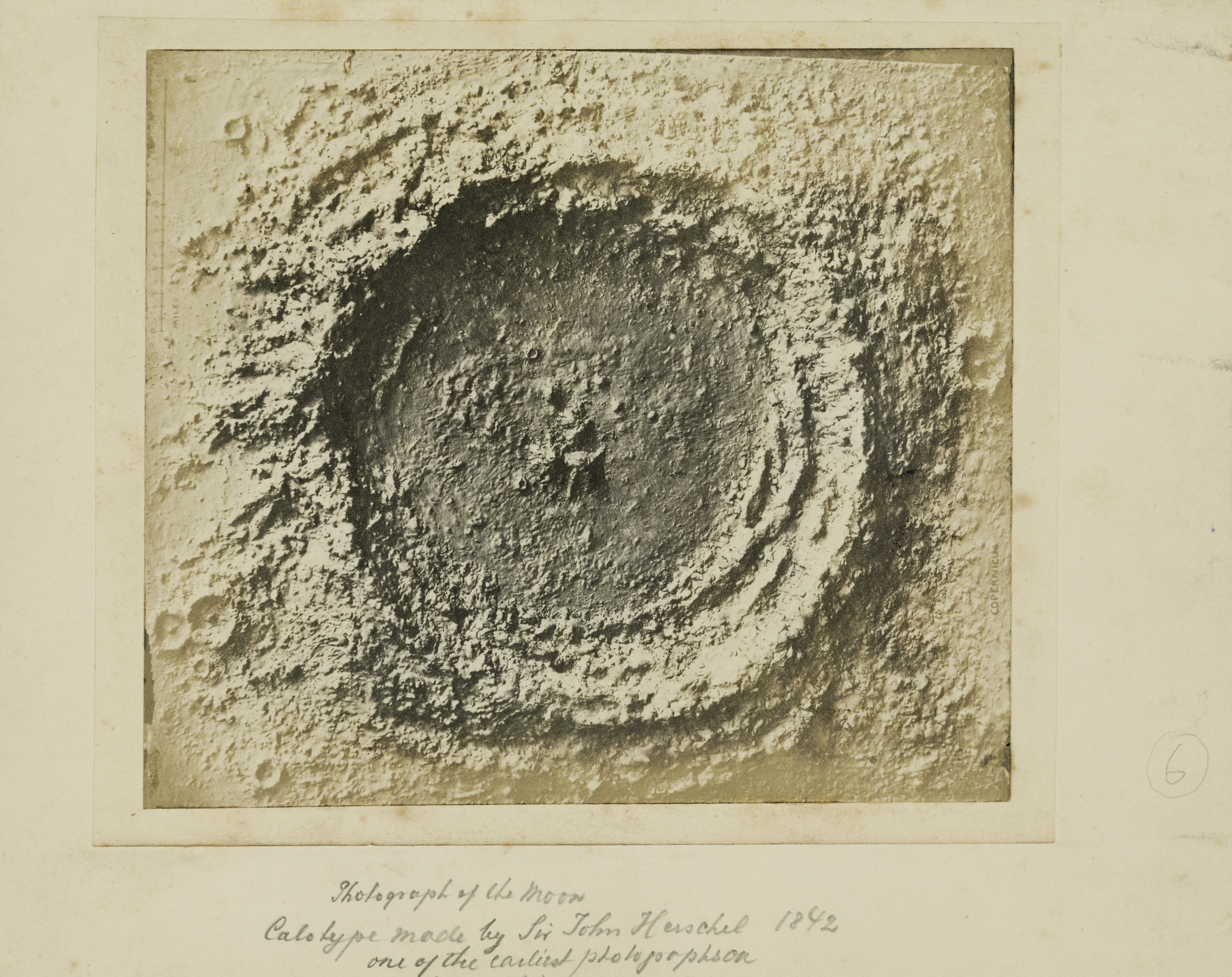
Calotype of (a model of) Copernicus by John Herschel, 1842

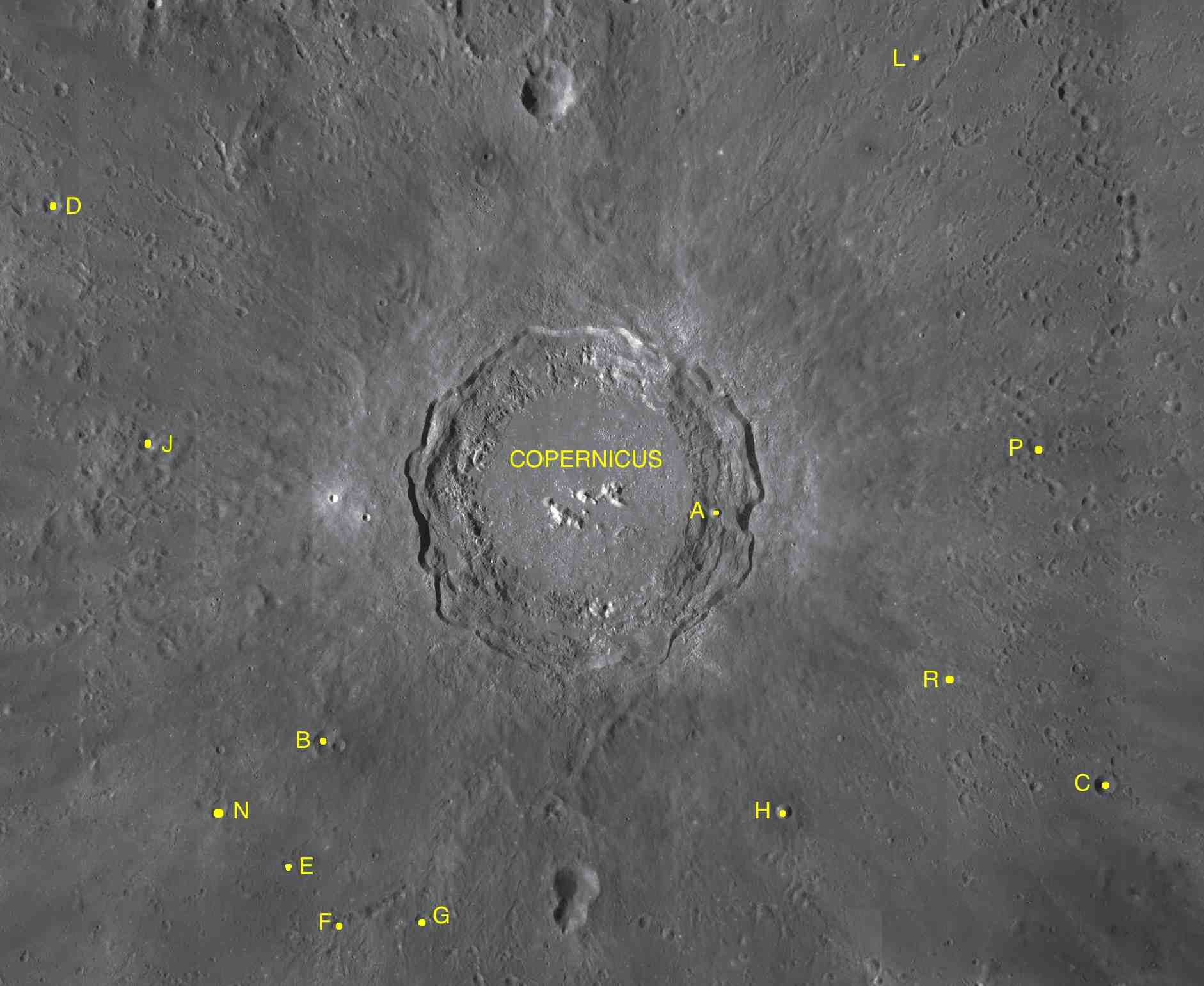
Copernicus and its satellite craters

By convention these features are identified on lunar maps by placing the letter on the side of the crater midpoint that is closest to Copernicus.

Copernicus	Coordinates	Diameter, km
A	9.52°N 18.90°W	3
B	7.50°N 22.39°W	8
C	7.12°N 15.44°W	6
D	12.20°N 24.80°W	5
E	6.40°N 22.70°W	4
F	5.89°N 22.24°W	3
G	5.92°N 21.51°W	4
H	6.89°N 18.29°W	4
J	10.13°N 23.94°W	6
L	13.48°N 17.08°W	4
N	6.91°N 23.31°W	6
P	10.11°N 16.06°W	4
R	8.06°N 16.84°W	4

Copernicus H, a typical "dark-halo" crater, was a target of observation by Lunar Orbiter 5 in 1967. Dark-halo craters were once believed to be volcanic in origin rather than the result of impacts. The Orbiter image showed that the crater had blocks of ejecta like other craters of similar size, indicating an impact origin. The halo results from excavation of darker material (mare basalt) at depth.

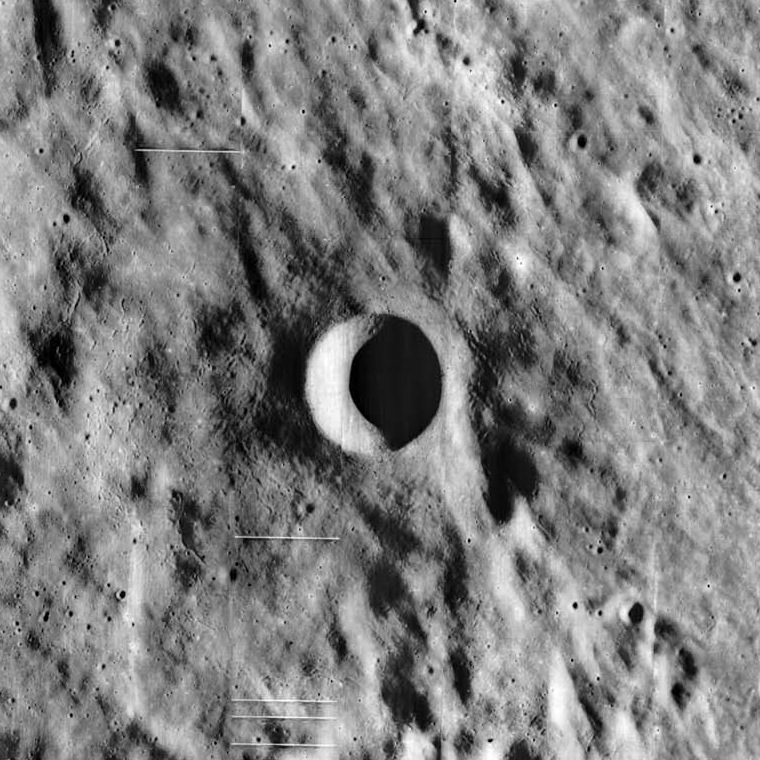
Copernicus H with subtle dark-halo

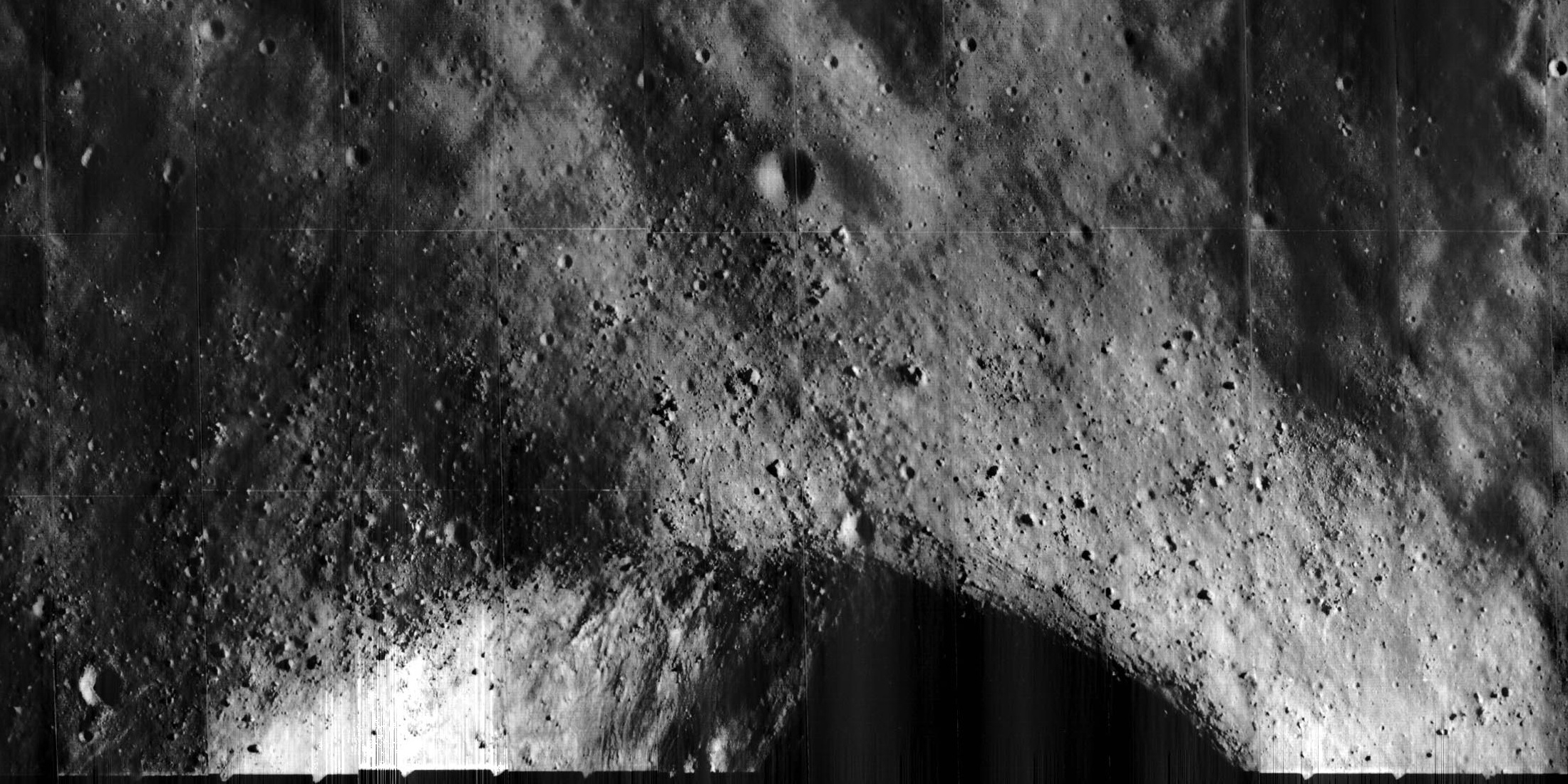
Blocks on the north rim of Copernicus H

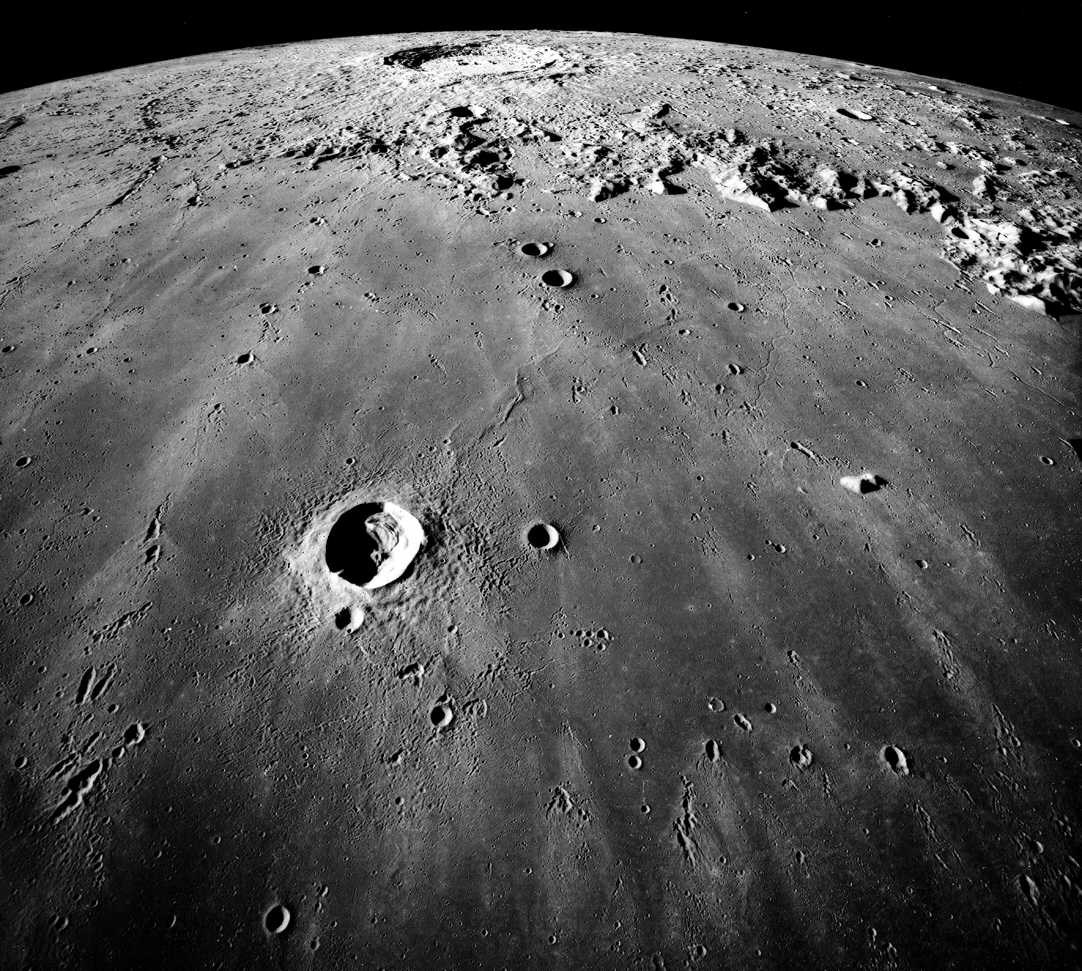
Southward looking oblique view of Mare Imbrium and Copernicus seen almost edge-on near the horizon with secondary elongated crater chains

== See also ==
- Surveyor 2, which crashed near this crater
- 1322 Coppernicus, asteroid
- List of craters on the Moon
- List of people with craters of the Moon named after them
- Lunar geologic timescale
