= Mare Insularum =

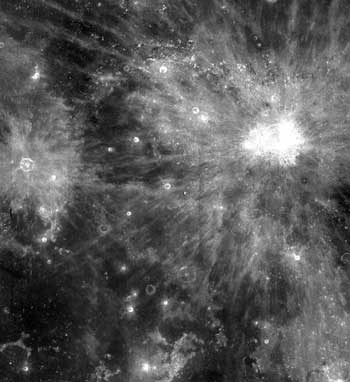
- Mare Insularum, bordered by the craters Copernicus on the east, and Kepler on the west. Oceanus Procellarum joins the mare to the southwest. The northern edge of Mare Cognitum is visible at the bottom of the photo, and Fra Mauro is the grey patch in the lower right.
- Coordinates: 7.5°N 30.9°W
- Diameter: 512 km (318 mi)
- Eponym: Sea of Islands

Mare Insularum /ɪnsʊˈlɛərəm/ (Latin īnsulārum, the "sea of islands") is a lunar mare located in the Insularum basin just south of the western Mare Imbrium. The basin material is of the Lower Imbrian epoch, with the mare material of the Upper Imbrian epoch. The mare is bordered by the craters Copernicus on the east, and Kepler on the west. Oceanus Procellarum joins the mare to the southwest.

Copernicus is one of the most noticeable craters on the Moon. The rays from both Kepler and Copernicus protrude into the mare. It is located near the crater Fra Mauro, the site of the Apollo 14 landing. Sinus Aestuum forms a northeastern extension to the mare.

The name was suggested by lunar geologist Don E. Wilhelms.
