= List of plains on the Moon =

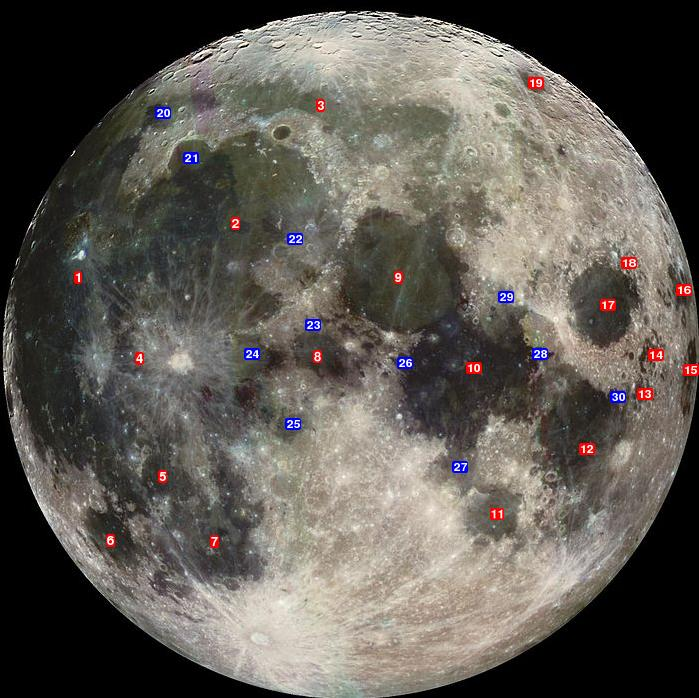
NASA photo of the near side of the Moon with prominent lunar plains numbered. Blue labels indicate sinūs while red labels indicate maria as well as the sole oceanus, Oceanus Procellarum, which is numbered one. Other lunar plains, including lacūs and paludes, are not labeled. (Note: In numerical order, the labeled lunar plains are: 1. Oceanus Procellarum, 2. Mare Imbrium, 3. Mare Frigoris, 4. Mare Insularum, 5. Mare Cognitum, 6. Mare Humorum, 7. Mare Nubium, 8. Mare Vaporum, 9. Mare Serenitatis, 10. Mare Tranquillitatis, 11. Mare Nectaris, 12. Mare Fecunditatis, 13. Mare Spumans, 14. Mare Undarum, 15. Mare Smythii, 16. Mare Marginis, 17. Mare Crisium, 18. Mare Anguis, 19. Mare Humboldtianum, 20. Sinus Roris, 21. Sinus Iridum, 22. Sinus Lunicus, 23. Sinus Fidei, 24. Sinus Aestuum, 25. Sinus Medii, 26. Sinus Honoris, 27. Sinus Asperitatis, 28. Sinus Concordiae, 29. Sinus Amoris, and 30. Sinus Successus.)

The Moon has numerous named plains on its surface made of dark-appearing basaltic rocks. The plains are visibly prominent on the near side of the Moon because of their contrasting appearance from the surrounding lunar highlands, which are made up of anorthosite, an igneous rock containing significant concentrations of highly reflective plagioclase feldspar minerals. As with other topographical features on the Moon, the official nomenclature for lunar plains uses a Latin naming system. Due to their darker appearance, differing elevation from the highlands, and visual prominence, noted ancient Greek astronomers such as Plutarch believed the plains were water; subsequent astronomers such as Galileo Galilei and Michael van Langren built on this belief, using Latin words for water bodies in classifying them. The Latin classifications for lunar plains are oceanus (lit. 'ocean'), mare (lit. 'sea'), lacus (lit. 'lake'), palus (lit. 'marsh'), and sinus (lit. 'bay').

The largest plain is Oceanus Procellarum (transl. Ocean of Storms), covering much of the western half of the Moon's near side and the only plain to be classified as an oceanus. Most other prominent plains on the near side are the lunar maria, while the Moon's lacūs, sinūs, and paludes (Note: The Latin plurals of mare, lacus, palus, and sinus are maria, lacūs, paludes, and sinūs, respectively. In English, some sources also use lacus and sinus (without the Latin diacritics) as both the singular and plural.) are generally smaller and less visually prominent.

The classification of and other designations for lunar geographic features are determined by the International Astronomical Union (IAU)—the official international organization for the standardization of astronomy.

== Geology ==
In its early stages of formation, the Moon's surface was largely molten, with its deep ocean of magma persisting for roughly tens of millions to hundreds of millions of years. After the cooling of the magma at the end of this period, minerals began to crystallize and differentiate, with heavier minerals sinking into the Moon's inner layers while the lighter, highly-reflective mineral of plagioclase feldspar rose to the surface and fused with other light, mafic-type crystals to form anorthosite rocks. The anorthosite accumulated to become an early stage of the Moon's outer crust. This early outer crust later became heavily bombarded by immense numbers of meteoroids and other solar system debris around 4 billion years ago, with substantial parts of the surface being blasted out to create craters and large basins. Millions of years after these massive impact basins formed, lava from the interior flowed up to the surface through cracks in the crust and filled the basins. The lava cooled into the dark, volcanic rock basalt, creating the lunar plains of today.

Currently, basaltic rock, which is also fine-grained and rich in iron, magnesium, and plagioclase feldspar, makes up most of the lunar plains' composition. As with the distribution of the lunar plains, basalt is also not uniformly distributed over the surface of the Moon, with approximately 26% of the Moon's near side and only 2% of its far side composed of basalt.

== Nomenclature ==
The modern system of Latin-based lunar nomenclature began in 1651, when Italian astronomer and Catholic priest Giovanni Battista Riccioli published Almagestum Novum, an encyclopedic work in which he and fellow Italian priest and scientist Francesco Maria Grimaldi created a detailed map of the lunar near side's surface. In the book, Riccioli introduced a system differentiating lunar topography into three categories, with dark plains comprising one category and given Latin labels for bodies of water together with poetic, abstract names. Riccioli's system was used significantly in Europe in the succeeding centuries and became the basis for the current global standard in 1935, when the IAU adopted much of Riccioli's names and conventions. Since the current IAU nomenclature rules were affirmed in 1973, new names for lunar plains have been restricted to Latin terms that describe weather and other abstract concepts. Currently, there are 5 lunar plains' names referring to sea features, 5 indicating sea attributes, and 5 expressing states of mind.

Of plains inscribed prior to 1973 by the IAU, there are four that carry non-abstract names: Mare Humboldtianum and Mare Smythii, named for German natural historian Alexander von Humboldt and British astronomer William Henry Smyth, respectively; Mare Moscoviense, named for Muscovy, a historical predecessor of Russia; and Sinus Lunicus, named for the Soviet space probe Luna 2 (Colloq. Lunik 2), which landed there in 1959. Because Mare Humboldtianum and Mare Smythii were established before the final nomenclature, they were maintained and not required to follow the name conventions. In the case of Mare Moscoviense, which was discovered by the Luna 3 and whose name was proposed by the Soviet Union, it was only accepted by the IAU with the justification that Moscow is a 'state of mind'.

== List ==
Plains of the Moon
Name (in Latin) (Note: In English, the Latin name is recognized as the formal, official title, though the English translation is used often as well.)	Name (English translation)	Diameter (Note: The approximate diameter or longest dimension of the feature in kilometers, as indicated by the United States Geological Survey's Gazetteer of Planetary Nomenclature.)	Year (Note: The year in which the feature was recognized by the International Astronomical Union.)	Quadrangles	Lunar coordinates	Refs.
Mare Anguis	Serpent Sea	145.99 km (90.71 mi)	1935	LAC-44	22°25′48″N 67°34′48″E	
Mare Australe	Southern Sea	996.84 km (619.41 mi)	1935	LAC-116	47°46′12″S 91°59′24″E	
Mare Cognitum	Sea that has become known (Note: Also translated as the Sea of Knowledge.)	350.01 km (217.49 mi)	1964	LAC-76	10°31′48″S 22°18′36″W	
Mare Crisium	Sea of Crises	555.92 km (345.43 mi)	1935	LAC-44	16°10′48″N 59°6′0″E	
Mare Fecunditatis	Sea of Fecundity	840.35 km (522.17 mi)	1935	LAC-80	7°49′48″S 53°40′12″E	
Mare Frigoris	Sea of Cold	1,446.41 km (898.76 mi)	1935	LAC-12	57°35′24″N 0°0′36″W	
Mare Humboldtianum	Sea of Humboldt	230.78 km (143.40 mi)	1935	LAC-15	56°55′12″N 81°32′24″E	
Mare Humorum	Sea of Moisture (Note: Also translated as the Sea of Humors.)	419.67 km (260.77 mi)	1935	LAC-93	24°28′48″S 38°34′12″W	
Mare Imbrium	Sea of Showers	1,145.53 km (711.80 mi)	1935	LAC-24	34°43′12″N 14°54′36″W	
Mare Ingenii	Sea of Cleverness	282.20 km (175.35 mi)	1961	LAC-119	33°15′0″S 164°49′48″E	
Mare Insularum	Sea of Islands	511.93 km (318.10 mi)	1976	LAC-57	7°47′24″N 30°38′24″W	
Mare Marginis	Sea of the Edge	357.63 km (222.22 mi)	1935	LAC-63	12°42′0″N 86°31′12″E	
Mare Moscoviense	Sea of Muscovy (Note: Also translated as the Sea of Moscow.)	275.57 km (171.23 mi)	1961	LAC-48	27°16′48″N 148°7′12″E	
Mare Nectaris	Sea of Nectar	339.39 km (210.89 mi)	1935	LAC-79	15°11′24″S 34°36′0″E	
Mare Nubium	Sea of Clouds	714.50 km (443.97 mi)	1935	LAC-94	20°35′24″S 17°17′24″W	
Mare Orientale	Eastern sea	294.16 km (182.78 mi)	1964	LAC-108	19°52′12″S 94°40′12″W	
Mare Serenitatis	Sea of Serenity	674.28 km (418.98 mi)	1935	LAC-42	27°17′24″N 18°21′36″E	
Mare Smythii	Sea of Smyth	373.97 km (232.37 mi)	1935	LAC-81	1°42′36″S 87°3′0″E	
Mare Spumans	Foaming Sea	143.13 km (88.94 mi)	1935	LAC-62	1°18′0″N 65°18′0″E	
Mare Tranquillitatis	Sea of Tranquility	875.75 km (544.17 mi)	1935	LAC-61	8°21′0″N 30°49′48″E	
Mare Undarum	Sea of Waves	244.84 km (152.14 mi)	1935	LAC-62	7°29′24″N 68°39′36″E	
Mare Vaporum	Sea of Vapors	242.46 km (150.66 mi)	1935	LAC-59	13°12′0″N 4°5′24″E	
Oceanus Procellarum	Ocean of Storms	2,592.24 km (1,610.74 mi)	1935	LAC-38	20°40′12″N 56°40′48″W	
Lacus Aestatis	Lake of Summer	86.39 km (53.68 mi)	1970	LAC-74	14°49′48″S 68°34′12″W	
Lacus Autumni	Lake of Autumn	195.65 km (121.57 mi)	1970	LAC-73	11°48′36″S 83°10′12″W	
Lacus Bonitatis	Lake of Goodness	122.10 km (75.87 mi)	1976	LAC-43	23°10′48″N 44°19′12″E	
Lacus Doloris	Lake of Sorrow	102.90 km (63.94 mi)	1976	LAC-41	16°48′0″N 8°36′36″E	
Lacus Excellentiae	Lake of Excellence	197.74 km (122.87 mi)	1976	LAC-110	35°39′0″S 43°34′48″W	
Lacus Felicitatis	Lake of Happiness	98.48 km (61.19 mi)	1976	LAC-41	18°31′12″N 5°21′36″E	
Lacus Gaudii	Lake of Joy	88.54 km (55.02 mi)	1976	LAC-42	16°19′48″N 12°16′12″E	
Lacus Hiemalis	Wintry Lake (Note: Also translated as the Lake of Winter.)	48.04 km (29.85 mi)	1976	LAC-60	15°0′36″N 13°58′12″E	
Lacus Lenitatis	Lake of Softness	78.25 km (48.62 mi)	1976	LAC-60	14°19′12″N 12°3′0″E	
Lacus Luxuriae	Lake of Luxury	50.61 km (31.45 mi)	1976	LAC-50	19°24′36″N 175°30′0″E	
Lacus Mortis	Lake of Death	158.78 km (98.66 mi)	1935	LAC-26	45°7′48″N 27°19′12″E	
Lacus Oblivionis	Lake of Forgetfulness	49.01 km (30.45 mi)	1976	LAC-105	20°23′24″S 168°31′12″W	
Lacus Odii	Lake of Hatred	72.68 km (45.16 mi)	1976	LAC-41	19°13′12″N 7°16′12″E	
Lacus Perseverantiae	Lake of Perseverance	70.64 km (43.89 mi)	1979	LAC-62	7°50′24″N 61°55′48″E	
Lacus Solitudinis	Lake of Solitude	122.67 km (76.22 mi)	1976	LAC-100	27°31′12″S 103°52′48″E	
Lacus Somniorum	Lake of Dreams	424.76 km (263.93 mi)	1935	LAC-26	37°33′36″N 30°48′0″E	
Lacus Spei	Lake of Hope	76.67 km (47.64 mi)	1976	LAC-28	43°27′36″N 65°12′0″E	
Lacus Temporis	Lake of Time	205.30 km (127.57 mi)	1976	LAC-27	46°46′12″N 56°12′36″E	
Lacus Tenebrarum	Lake of Darkness	85.00 km (52.82 mi)	2025	LAC-144	86°42′36″S 87°40′12″W	
Lacus Timoris	Lake of Fear	153.65 km (95.47 mi)	1976	LAC-111	39°25′12″S 27°57′0″W	
Lacus Veris	Lake of Spring	382.88 km (237.91 mi)	1970	LAC-91	16°28′48″S 85°54′36″W	
Palus Epidemiarum	Marsh of Epidemics	300.38 km (186.65 mi)	1935	LAC-94	32°0′0″S 27°32′24″W	
Palus Putredinis	Marsh of Decay	180.45 km (112.13 mi)	1935	LAC-41	27°21′36″N 0°0′0″E	
Palus Somni	Marsh of Sleep	163.45 km (101.56 mi)	1935	LAC-61	13°41′24″N 44°43′12″E	
Sinus Aestuum	Seething Bay	316.50 km (196.66 mi)	1935	LAC-59	12°6′0″N 8°20′24″W	
Sinus Amoris	Bay of Love	189.10 km (117.50 mi)	1976	LAC-43	19°55′12″N 37°17′24″E	
Sinus Asperitatis	Bay of Roughness	219.14 km (136.17 mi)	1976	LAC-78	5°24′36″S 27°29′24″E	
Sinus Concordiae	Bay of Harmony	159.03 km (98.82 mi)	1976	LAC-61	10°58′48″N 42°28′12″E	
Sinus Fidei	Bay of Trust	70.70 km (43.93 mi)	1976	LAC-41	17°59′24″N 2°2′24″E	
Sinus Honoris	Bay of Honor	111.61 km (69.35 mi)	1976	LAC-60	11°43′12″N 17°52′12″E	
Sinus Iridum	Bay of Rainbows	249.29 km (154.90 mi)	1935	LAC-24	45°0′36″N 31°40′12″W	
Sinus Lunicus	Lunik Bay	119.18 km (74.06 mi)	1970	LAC-25	32°21′36″N 1°51′0″W	
Sinus Medii	Bay of the center	286.67 km (178.13 mi)	1935	LAC-59	1°37′48″N 1°1′48″E	
Sinus Roris	Bay of Dew	195.04 km (121.19 mi)	1935	LAC-10	50°15′36″N 50°51′36″W	
Sinus Successus	Bay of Success	126.65 km (78.70 mi)	1979	LAC-62	1°7′12″N 58°31′12″E	
Sinus Viscositatis	Bay of Stickiness	68.00 km (42.25 mi)	2022	LAC-23	35°15′0″N 40°59′24″W	

== Clickable map ==
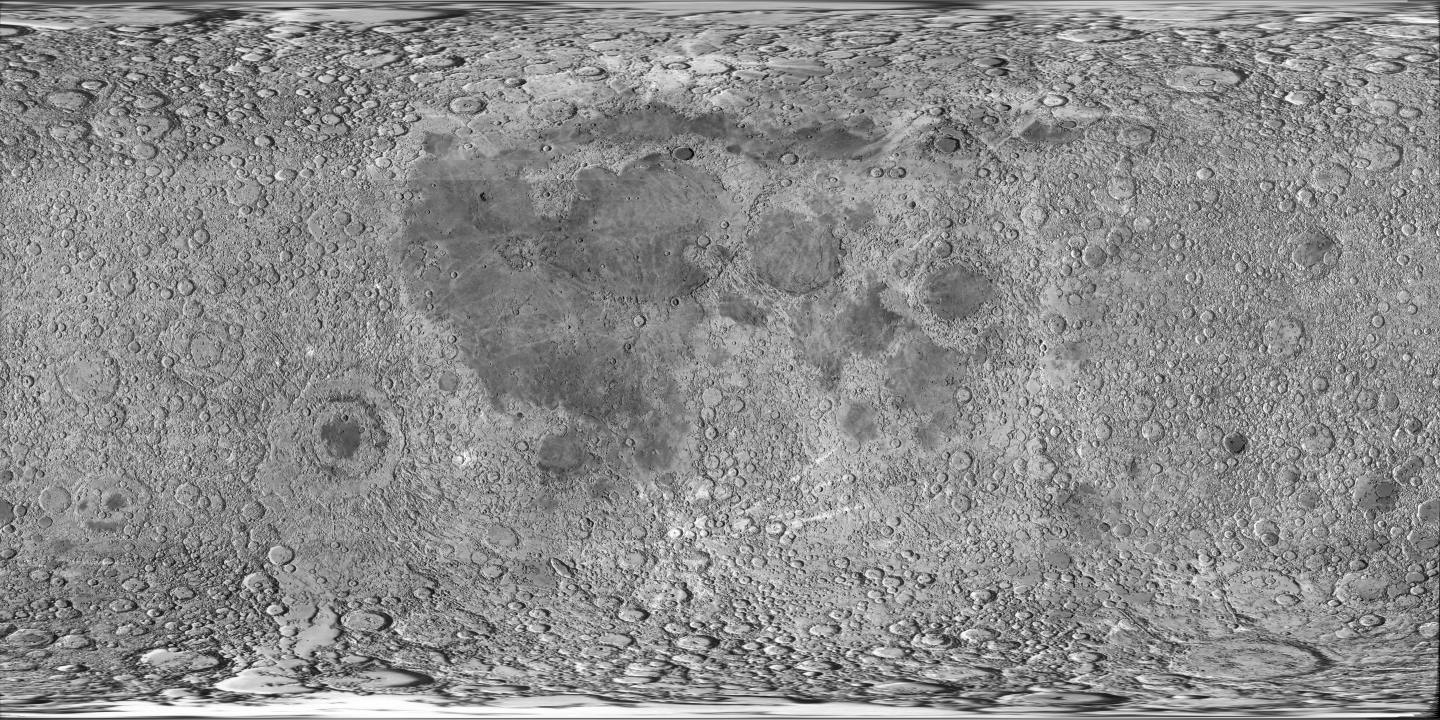
Location of lunar plains on an equirectangular projection of the Moon: Maria; Lacūs; Paludes; Sinūs; Oceanus Procellarum. The lunar north pole is located at the top of the map.

== See also ==
- List of craters on the Moon
- List of features on the Moon
- List of mountains on the Moon
- List of valleys on the Moon
- Selenography
