= Yangelʹ =

Crater on the Moon

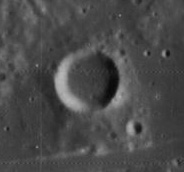
- Lunar Orbiter 4 image
- Coordinates: 17.0°N 4.7°E
- Diameter: 8 km
- Depth: 0.4 km
- Colongitude: 355° at sunrise
- Eponym: Mikhail K. Yangelʹ

Yangelʹ is a small lunar impact crater that is located in the irregular terrain to the north of the Mare Vaporum. Its diameter is 8 km. It was named after Soviet rocketry scientist Mikhail Kuzmich Yangelʹ in 1973. This crater was formerly designated Manilius F.

It is a relatively solitary crater formation, and the nearest larger craters lie more than 100 kilometers distant. To the southeast of Yangelʹ is the prominent crater Manilius. Conon is located to the northwest, near the flanks of the Montes Apenninus range.

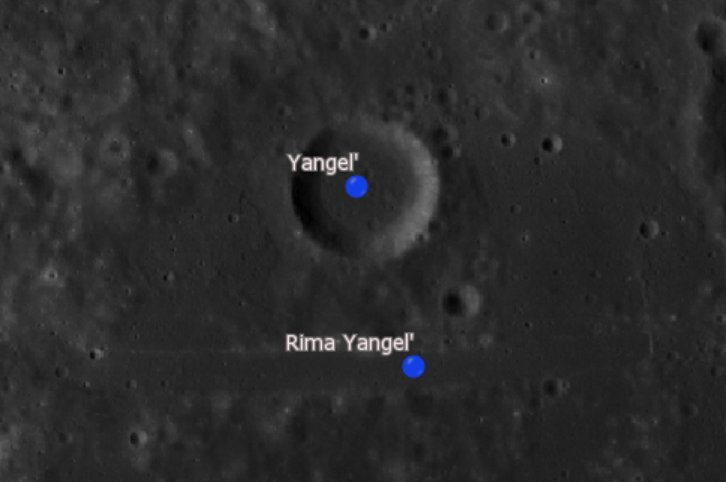
LRO image featuring Yangelʹ and its rille

Just to the north of Yangelʹ is the small lunar mare named Lacus Felicitatis, or Lake of Happiness. To the northeast, forming a bay on the Mare Vaporum, is Sinus Fidei. A sinuous rille named Rima Conon runs along the middle of this feature, reaching the northern end.

This is a circular, bowl-shaped crater with a narrow outer rim. The interior floor has a relatively low albedo that matches the dark hue of the mare to the south.
