= Julius Caesar (crater) =

Crater on the Moon

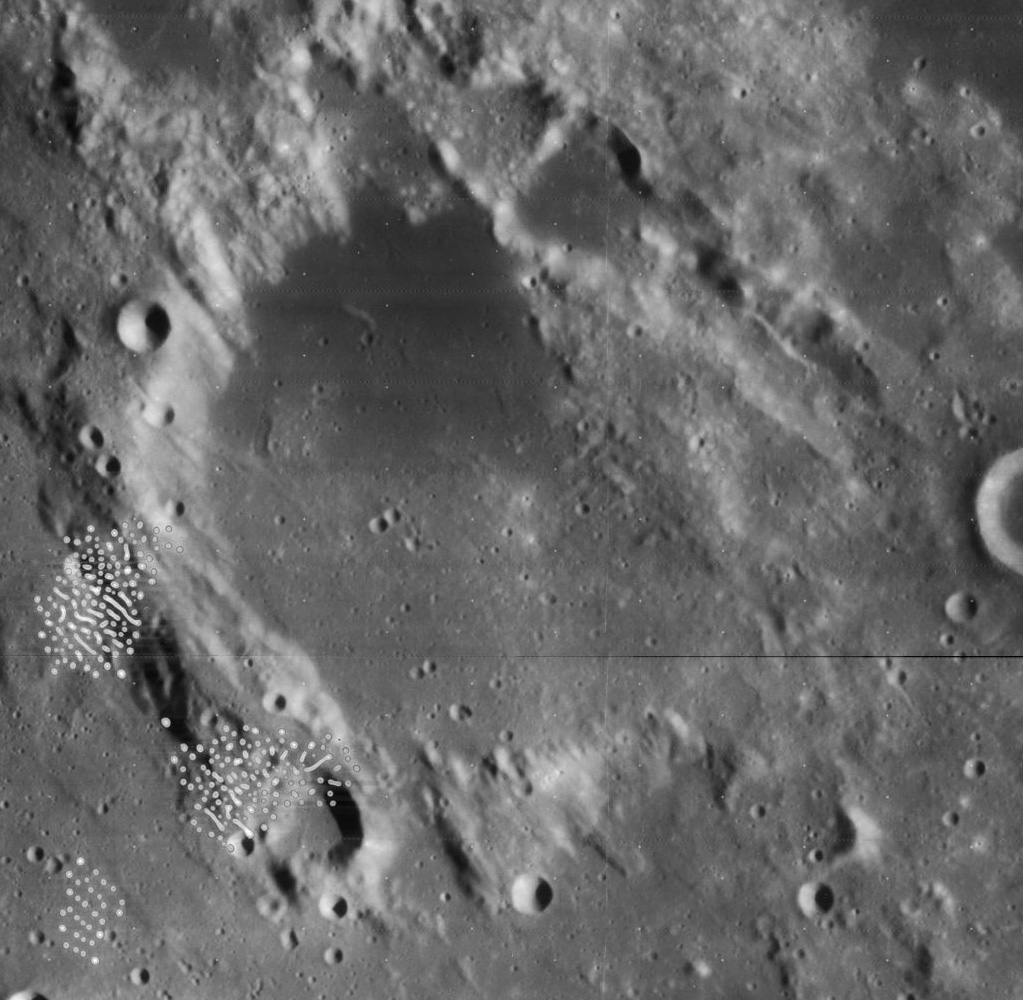
- Mosaic of Lunar Orbiter 4 images (White blemishes in lower left are present on original images)
- Coordinates: 9.0°N 15.4°E
- Diameter: 85 km
- Depth: 3.4 km
- Colongitude: 345° at sunrise
- Eponym: Julius Caesar

Julius Caesar is a lava-flooded lunar impact crater with a low, irregular, and heavily worn wall. Its diameter is 85 km. It was named after Roman statesman Julius Caesar. T. W. Webb described it as a very dark enclosure. It is located to the west of Mare Tranquillitatis, and directly southeast of the crater Manilius on the Mare Vaporum. To the east is the rounded Sosigenes.

The interior floor of Julius Caesar is relatively level, especially in the southwest half. The northern half of the interior has a lower albedo (darker) than the south. Most likely the floor has been covered or modified by ejecta from the impact that created the Imbrium basin. There are a number of crater remnants overlapping the rim along the south and northeast edges. A low ridge crosses the floor across the northeast sections of the crater.

== Satellite craters ==
By convention these features are identified on lunar maps by placing the letter on the side of the crater midpoint that is closest to Julius Caesar.

Julius Caesar	Latitude	Longitude	Diameter
A	7.6° N	14.4° E	13 km
B	9.8° N	14.0° E	7 km
C	7.3° N	15.4° E	5 km
D	7.2° N	16.5° E	5 km
F	11.5° N	12.9° E	19 km
G	10.2° N	15.7° E	20 km
H	8.8° N	13.6° E	3 km
J	9.2° N	14.1° E	3 km
P	11.2° N	14.1° E	37 km
Q	12.9° N	14.0° E	32 km

== Bright starlike craterlet north of Julius Caesar ==
Experienced observers of the full moon know the existence of the officially unnamed bright starlike craterlet north of Julius Caesar and south of Menelaus, at the northwestern end of Sinus Honoris. Its starlike appearance is also noticeable on the photographic version of chart LAC 60 (page 120) in The Clementine Atlas of the Moon (Ben Bussey / Paul D. Spudis).
