= Marcus Manilius =

Ancient Roman astrologer

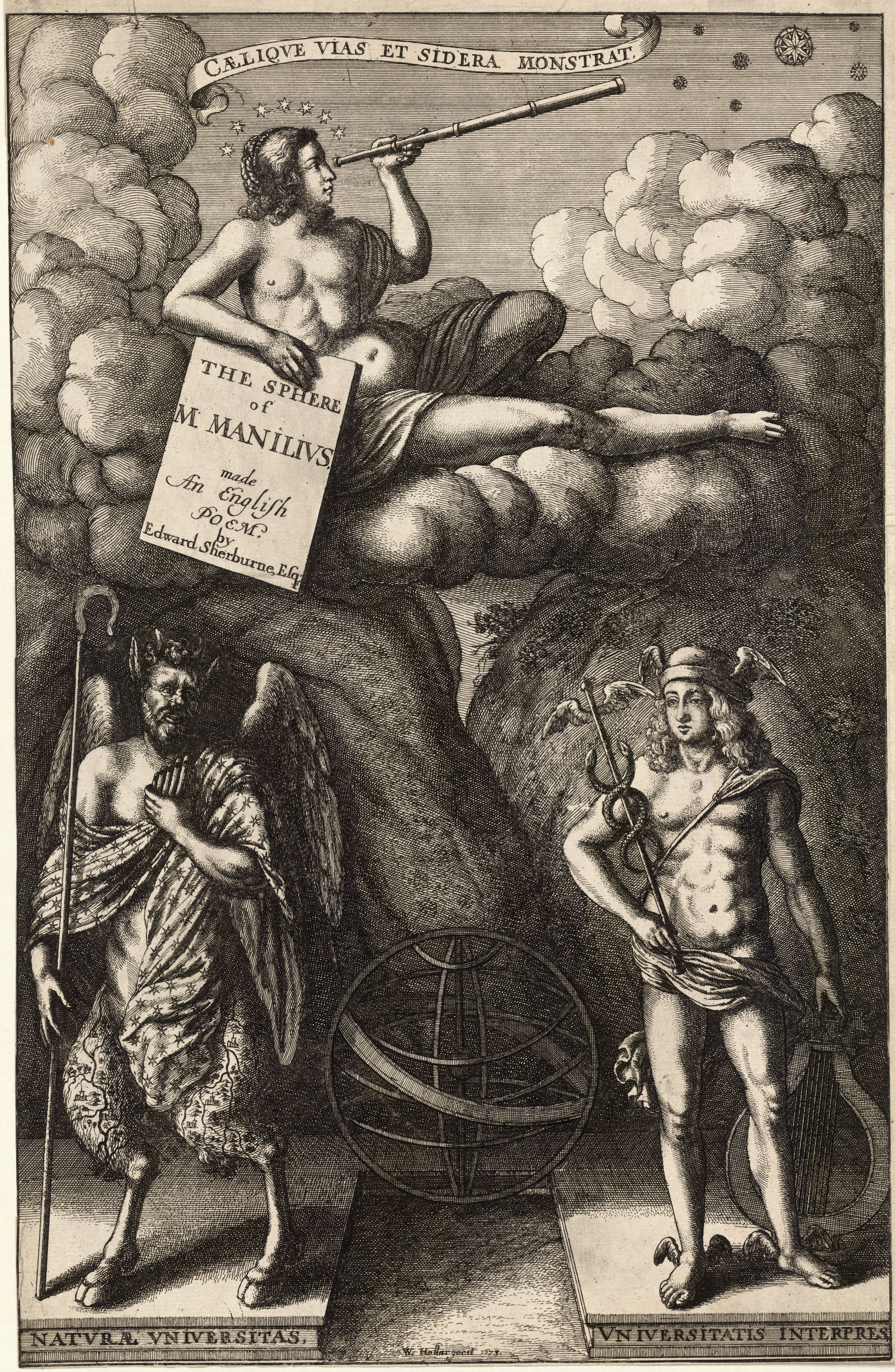
Manilius. The sphere.; artwork by Wenceslaus Hollar

Marcus Manilius (fl. 1st century AD) was a Roman poet, astrologer, and author of a poem in five books called Astronomica.

== The Astronomica ==
The author of Astronomica is neither quoted nor mentioned by any ancient writer. Even his name is uncertain, but it was probably Marcus Manilius; in the earlier books the author is anonymous, the later give Manilius, Manlius, Mallius. The poem itself implies that the writer lived under Augustus or Tiberius, and that he was a citizen of and resident in Rome, suggesting that Manilius wrote the work during the 20s CE. According to the early 18th-century classicist Richard Bentley, he was an Asiatic Greek; according to the 19th-century classicist Fridericus Jacob, an African. It has been suggested that he might hailed from Roman Syria, or be a Roman senator. His work is one of great learning; he had studied his subject in the best writers, and generally represents the most advanced views of the ancients on astronomy (or rather astrology).

Manilius frequently imitates Lucretius. Although his diction presents some peculiarities, the style is metrically correct, and he could write neat and witty hexameters.

The astrological systems of houses, linking human affairs with the circuit of the zodiac, have evolved over the centuries, but they make their first appearance in Astronomica. The earliest datable surviving horoscope that uses houses in its interpretation is slightly earlier, c. 20 BCE. Claudius Ptolemy (100–170 CE) almost completely ignored houses (templa as Manilius calls them) in his astrological text, Tetrabiblos.

== Honors ==
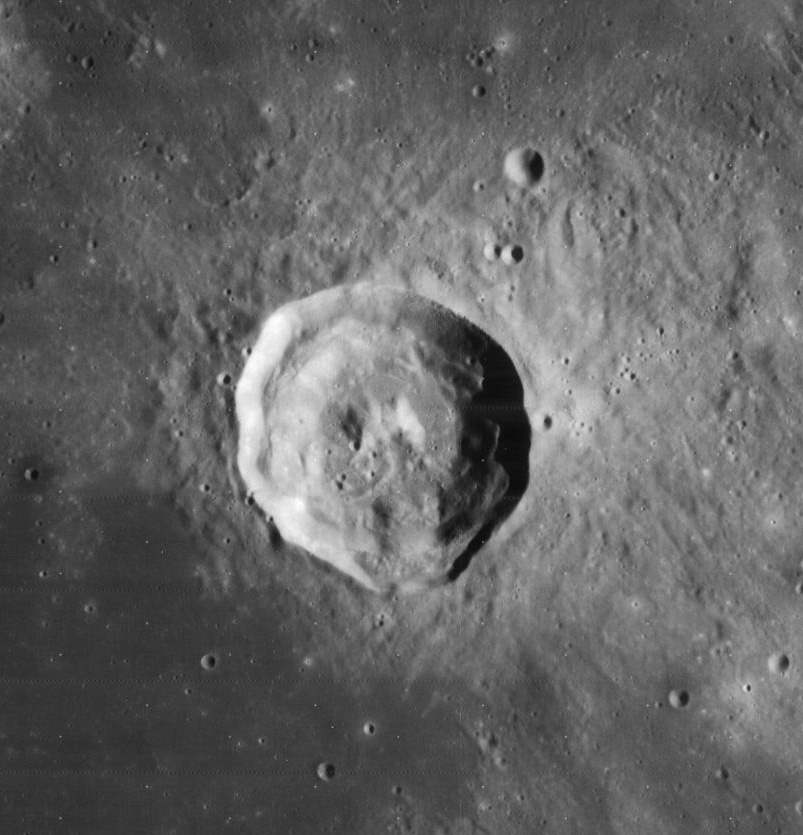
Manilius (Lunar Orbiter 4)

An impact crater on the Moon is named after him: Manilius is located in the Mare Vaporum.

== Editions ==
- J. R. Bram (ed.), Ancient Astrology: Theory and Practice. Matheseos Libri VIII by Firmicus Maternus (Park Ridge, 1975).
- Manilio Il poema degli astri (Astronomica), testo critico a cura di E. Flores, traduzione di Ricardo Scarcia, commento a cura di S. Feraboli e R. Scarcia, 2 vols. (Milano, 1996–2001).
- Wolfgang Hübner (ed.), Manilius, Astronomica, Buch V (2 Bde) (Berlin/New York: De Gruyter, 2010) (Sammlung wissenschaftlicher Commentare).
