= Avempace =

Arab Andalusian polymath (c. 1085 – 1138)

- ابن باجة
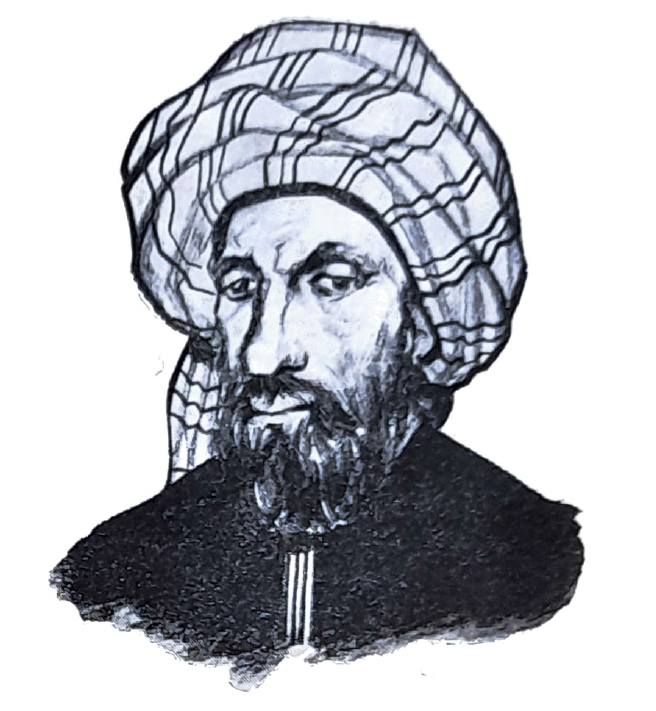
- A sketch representing Avempace from a book entitled Sayr mulhimah: min al-Sharq wa-al-Gharb by unknown author, 1961
- Born: Abū Bakr Muḥammad ibn Yaḥya ibn aṣ-Ṣā’igh at-Tūjībī ibn Bājja c. 1085; Saraqusta, Taifa of Zaragoza, Al-Andalus
- Died: 1138 (aged 52–53); Fes, Almoravid Empire
- Other name: Ibn Bajja
- Scientific career
- Fields: Astronomer, philosopher, physician, physicist, poet, scientist

Abū Bakr Muḥammad ibn Yaḥya ibn aṣ-Ṣā’igh at-Tūjībī ibn Bājja (Arabic: أبو بكر محمد بن يحيى بن الصائغ التجيبي بن باجة), known simply as Ibn Bajja (Arabic: ابن باجة) or his Latinized name Avempace (/ˈeɪvəmpeɪs/; c. 1085 – 1138), was an Arab polymath, whose writings include works regarding astronomy, physics, and music, as well as philosophy, medicine, botany, and poetry.

He was the author of the Kitāb an-Nabāt ("The Book of Plants"), a popular work on botany, which defined the sex of plants. His philosophical theories influenced the work of Ibn Rushd (Averroes) and Albertus Magnus. Most of his writings and books were not completed (or well-organized) due to his early death. He had a vast knowledge of medicine, mathematics, and astronomy. His main contribution to Islamic philosophy was his idea on soul phenomenology, which was never completed.

Avempace was, in his time, not only a prominent figure of philosophy but also of music and poetry. His diwan (Arabic: collection of poetry) was rediscovered in 1951. Though many of his works have not survived, his theories in astronomy and physics were preserved by Moses Maimonides and Averroes respectively, and influenced later astronomers and physicists in the Islamic civilization and Renaissance Europe, including Galileo Galilei.

Avempace wrote one of the first (argued by some to be the first) commentaries on Aristotle in the Western world. While his work on projectile motion was never translated from Arabic to Latin, his views became well known around the Western world and to Western philosophers, astronomers, and scientists of many disciplines. His works impacted contemporary medieval thought, and later influenced Galileo and his work. Avempace's theories on projectile motion are found in the text known as "Text 71".

== Biography ==
Avempace was of Arab descent. He was born in Zaragoza, in what is today Aragon, Spain, around 1085 and died in Fes then under the Almoravid dynasty, in 1138. Rulers of Zaragoza shifted constantly throughout Avempace's young life, but in 1114, a new Almoravid governor of Zaragoza was appointed: Abu Bakr 'Ali ibn Ibrahim as-Sahrawi, also known as Ibn Tifilwit. The close relationship between Avempace and Ibn Tifilwit is verified in writings by Ibn al-Khatib. Avempace enjoyed music and wine with the governor and also composed panegyrics and muwashshahat to publicly praise Ibn Tifilwit, who rewarded him by nominating him as his vizier. In a diplomatic mission to meet the overthrown Imad ad-Dawla Ibn Hud King in his castle, Avempace was placed in jail for some months for reasons unknown. Ibn Tifilwit was also killed during a quest against the Christians in 1116, ending his short reign and inspiring Avempace to compose mournful elegies in his honor. Avempace also had a talent for singing and composition in music. In the beginning of his career, he wrote the manuscript Risālah fī l-alḥān (Tract on melodies) and incorporated his commentary on al-Fārābī’s treatise based on music. He determined the correlations between different melodies and temperament. According to biographer al-Maqqarī, Avempace's passion for music was due to poetry and had “the virtue of dispelling the sadness and pain of the hearts [sic].” He included his scientific knowledge and wit in many poems. Avempace joined in poetic competitions with the poet al-Tutili.

After the fall of Zaragoza in 1118 by the hands of King Alfonso The Battler, Avempace looked for shelter under Abu Ishaq Ibrahim ibn Yûsuf Ibn Tashfin, another brother of the Almoravid Sultan (Ali Ibn Yusuf Ibn Tashfin) in Xàtiba. He worked, for some twenty years, as the vizier of Yusuf Ibn Tashfin. Throughout these decades, it is clear that Avempace was not as agreeable with those close to the ruler, Ibn Tashfin, as he was during the previous reign of Ibn Tifilwit. Writings by Ahmad al-Maqqari gives us insight into the hostility and disagreements between Avempace and the father of a famous physician respected by Ibn Tashfin, Abd al-Malik. A poetry anthology, Qala’id al-iqya (Necklace of Rubies), was also created by a courtier of Ibn Tashufin's, Abu Nasr al-Fath Ibn Muhammad Ibn Khaqan, which condescendingly placed Avempace in last place. Under Ibn Tashfin, the Sultan of the Almoravid empire, Avempace was imprisoned twice. The details of the imprisonment are not well understood, but can be assumed. Despite being unwelcomed, Avempace remained with the Almoravid empire for the rest of his life until his death in 1138. There has been evidence presented that brings up the argument that the cause of Avempace's death was by poison from his peers. Al-Maqqari details in his writing that a physician, Abu l-'Ala' Ibn Zuhr, was an enemy of Avempace's whose servant, Ibn Ma‛yub, was suspected of poisoning him at the time but was never convicted. Among his many teachers was Abu Jafar ibn Harun of Trujillo, a physician in Seville, Al-Andalus.

== Philosophy ==
Ibn Bajja, also known as Avempace, was an important Islamic philosopher, among his many other trades. In his time, he was seen as a controversial figure, receiving criticism from his peers like Ibn Tufayl. However, he was also respected by his peers and even his critics. While Ibn Tufayl was noted for criticizing Ibn Bajjah's work, he also described him as having one of the sharpest minds with one of the soundest reasoning as compared to the others following the first generation of speakers.

Around his time, Islamic philosophy, and the post-hellenic world, was mainly divided into two opposing branches of thoughts. The Eastern branch, which was led by Ibn Sina, known as Avicenna in Latin, and the Western branch, which was led by Ibn Bajjah. Avempace's work in philosophy is seen as uneven and mostly incomplete, but what parts of his work that survive to this day demonstrates originality in his thought process. His main philosophical work is the unfinished politico-ethical treatise Governance of the Solitary.

Upon his unplanned trip to Egypt, Avempace wrote Risālat al-wadāʿ (Letter of Bidding Farewell) and Risālat al-ittiṣāl al-ʿaql bi al-insān (Letter on the Union of the Intellect with Human Beings) that were dedicated to Ibn al-Imām. His famous works included Tadbīr al-mutawaḥḥid (Management of the Solitary), the Kitāb al-nafs (Book on the Soul), and the Risāla fī l-Ghāya al-insāniyya (Treatise on the Objective of Human Beings). The reflections of his famous accomplishments show how these were written near the end of his life. He was inspired based on Aristotelian line. In Avempace's philosophy, it contains two key pillars, solitude and conjunction. Solitude represents the isolation philosopher commonly seeks in order to protect himself from the corruption of society and conjunction refers to the philosopher's quest for the lowest celestial intelligence. It is required for the human soul's development.

These works are tough to understand. Nevertheless, Risālat al-ittiṣāl has interpreted the introduction. The treatise stated the overall point of Avempace's thinking:

"The ultimate end of man, namely the contemplation of truth, with the active intellect joining the human intellect in a contemplative and almost mystic way."

However, the most important idea from Avempace's system was not mentioned in the treatise, "how the union of the active intellect with man occurs, which is the ultimate goal being pursued by the solitary."

From his writings, Ibn Bajjah has been shown to take a liking to Plato's contribution to philosophy. Ibn Bajjah, in particular, takes from Plato's idea of the necessary connection between man and city with a bit of a twist. Plato's idea was to model the perfect city after the human soul. On the other hand, Avempace wanted to use the perfect city as a model for the human soul. Avempace imagines the perfect city as a place that is free of any beliefs or opinions that are in opposition of the truth and where true science reigns supreme. Any man or idea that contradicts these true beliefs are defined as "weeds." Weeds are only to be found in imperfect cities.

Avempace also wrote on the health of a perfect man. He alluded to the idea that the perfect man does not just require physical health, but spiritual health too. Avempace goes into more detail about the soul, which he describes of having both an acquired intellect, as well as an active intellect. The active intellect has no basis coming from the physical world. Acquired intellect, however, is a result of experiences from the material world. The perfect man can exist in either a perfect city or a non-perfect city. However, if a perfect man lives in a non-perfect city, he believes that they are to remain apart from the rest of the society. This is because a non-perfect city is full of weeds. In order for a perfect person to preserve themselves from the weeds, they need to live in solitude despite living in solitude being against human nature.

In addition, Avempace had changed forgotten non-syllogistic arts into “practical arts”, and wrote:

"If some of them [the practical arts] employ syllogisms as medicine and agriculture do, they are not called syllogistic because their purpose is not [to convince another] nor to employ syllogisms, but to do some activity."

He wrote nine medical treatises. Galen inscribed commentary on Hippocrates’ Aphorisms in “Commentary on Aphorisms” that includes Avempace's view about medicine. Medical syllogisms are revolved by means of experience. Experience is obtained in a person's life time through perception. Avempace defines experience:

"As man's reliance on perception to know particular [aspects, juz’iyyat] of some matter so that some science results from this perception.

Experience is said in general and in particular. If it is said in general, it points out that perception intents knowing particular [aspects] of a matter, from which a universal proposition results. The particular [instances] may take place either by man's will or naturally."

Avempace considers experience as the second essential part of medicine. Avempace's theoretic system sketched out all reality. Reality comes in many forms that includes motion and action. Avempace categorizes them between natural and artificial. Natural reality forms move bodies with power while bodies within artificial reality forms are unintentionally moved. It also show how the body is viewed.

“Art (sina‛a) is the elaborated form abstracted from matter; it is abstracted from its matter. The artificial form which exists in its matter does not have any power to move that which is in it nor to move something else. This is the difference between artificial and natural forms."

This example also represents the use of motion:

“If there is a house, there is a foundation by necessity, and this kind of necessity is a relationship between the causes of the existing [object] and the final [cause]. If [the final cause] is described, the various kinds of the causes follow it by necessity, and the form acts in a similar way.

If the form is the final [cause] of a motion, motion follows it by necessity, and it is something evident because, if there is building activity, there will be a house, and if there is building, there is the art of construction, but if there is only the art of construction, there will be no building. If [form] is acquired ‘by design,’ the other causes result in an orderly way from the final cause by necessity.”

This shows as human involvement is design. Absolute necessity reigns over the heavens. Avempace views necessity into three kinds: absolute, design, and material. Avempace demonstrates the moon eclipses using absolute necessity over time. Based on the relations of the moon eclipses, Avempace indicates “possibility shares necessity”. He defines the body as an artificial collection of matter, which acts as an instrument for the soul to work through. In doing so, he establishes the soul as an autonomous subject. Avempace believes that the human soul has three stages. It starts in the plant stage, then to the animal stage, and finally to human stage. Each stage has an important attribute that the soul grows from. The plant life is where the soul is provided with nourishment and growth. In the animal stage, the soul is introduced to sensations. When the soul moves to the human state, the soul gains common sense, imagination, and memory. Additionally, Avempace writes that the soul is geometrically formless. Because its form is beyond our understanding of geometric shapes, he states, it exists on a plane higher than that which we perceive with our bodies. Avempace is said to have been influenced by Platonic and Aristotelian views on the subject. He credits Plato with the theory of the soul as a substance:

"Since it was clear to Plato that the soul is assigned to substance, and that substance is predicated on the form and matter which is body, and that the soul cannot be said to be a body, he fervently defined the soul in its particular aspect. Since he had established that the forms of spheres are souls, he looked for the commonality of all [souls], and found that sense perception is particular to animals, [but] that movement is particular to all, and therefore he defined the soul as “something which moves itself."

Avempace also describes four types of Intelligible forms. They are described as bodies that have an eternal circular motion, an acquired intellect, those with external senses, and those with internal senses. These ideas are consistent with Aristotle's descriptions of the soul and its properties in his treatise De Anima, though there is speculation that there were no Arabic transcriptions available to Avempace.

Avempace, known as "Ibn al-Sa’igh" by Jewish tradition, is rarely recognized for his philosophical and astronomical works that influenced and were employed by many Medieval Jewish philosophers during and after his short life. The first record of Avempace's influence on Jewish philosophy comes from a well-known Jewish contemporary author and philosopher: Judah Halevi. In Chapter 1 of his greatest philosophical work, The Kuzari, Halevi summarizes three ideas directly influenced by works of Ibn Bajja: one's unification with the Active Intellect is attainable during their lifetime, this unification implies cognitive identity with others who are aware of the truth, and a philosopher's life is a solitary regimen.

The renowned polymath and Jewish philosopher, Maimonides, was possibly born in the same year of Avempace's death, yet he preserved and studied the works of the deceased Andalusian. Maimonides admired Avempace for his achievements, stating that "[Ibn Bajja] was a great and wise philosopher, and all of his works are right and correct". Maimonides also valued Ibn Bajja's commentary on Aristotle's works on astronomy. In one of his three major works, The Guide for the Perplexed, Maimonides assesses Hebrew Bible theology with Aristotelian philosophy, directly drawing influence from Ibn Bajja philosophical and scientific ideas. Specifically incorporating Avempace's philosophies regarding the existence of a single intellect after death, the union of man with the Active Intellect, the division of man into three classes of increasing consciousness, and the proposal of the prophet as an ideal solitary man.

Avempace rejects that feeling ultimate pleasure comes from witnessing the divine world internally. For Avempace, the highest form of spiritual happiness comes from science and the truth. Science allows for the truth to be discovered. As a result, in order to be spiritually healthy and, therefore, happy, we must obtain knowledge and search for the truth.

Despite all the ideas that have been presented by Avempace, a central theory was never actually developed. He attributed this to being a very busy man and having his hands in a variety of a fields.

== Astronomy ==
In Islamic astronomy, Maimonides wrote the following on the planetary model proposed by Avempace:

"I have heard that Abu Bakr [Ibn Bajja] discovered a system in which no epicycles occur, but eccentric spheres are not excluded by him. I have not heard it from his pupils; and even if it be correct that he discovered such a system, he has not gained much by it, for eccentricity is likewise contrary to the principles laid down by Aristotle.... I have explained to you that these difficulties do not concern the astronomer, for he does not profess to tell us the existing properties of the spheres, but to suggest, whether correctly or not, a theory in which the motion of the stars and planets is uniform and circular, and in agreement with observation."

In his commentary on Aristotle's Meteorology, Avempace presented his own theory on the Milky Way galaxy. Aristotle believed the Milky Way to be caused by "the ignition of the fiery exhalation of some stars which were large, numerous and close together" and that the "ignition takes place in the upper part of the atmosphere, in the region of the world which is continuous with the heavenly motions." On the other hand, Aristotle's Arabic commentator Ibn al-Bitriq considered "the Milky Way to be a phenomenon exclusively of the heavenly spheres, not of the upper part of the atmosphere" and that the "light of those stars makes a visible patch because they are so close." Avempace's view differed from both, as he considered "the Milky Way to be a phenomenon both of the spheres above the moon and of the sublunar region." The Stanford Encyclopedia of Philosophy describes his theory and observation on the Milky Way as follows:

"The Milky Way is the light of many stars which almost touch one another. Their light forms a “continuous image” (khayâl muttasil) on the surface of the body which is like a “tent” (takhawwum) under the fierily element and over the air which it covers. Avempace defines the continuous image as the result of refraction (in‛ikâs) and supports its explanation with an observation of a conjunction of two planets, Jupiter and Mars which took place in 500/1106-7. He watched the conjunction and “saw them having an elongate figure” although their figure is circular."

Avempace also reported observing "two planets as black spots on the face of the Sun." In the 13th century, the Maragha astronomer Qotb al-Din Shirazi identified this observation as the transit of Venus and Mercury. However, Avempace cannot have observed a Venus transit, as there were no Venus transits in his lifetime.

Avempace worked under the mathematician Ibn al-Sayyid. He was given the privilege to add a commentary to Ibn al-Sayyid's work on geometry and Euclid's Elements. Furthermore, he viewed astronomy as part of mathematics. Avempace's model of the cosmos consists of concentric circles, but no epicycles.

== Physics ==
Averroes was another important philosopher, and while he was born shortly before Avempace's death, Averroes later in life would be in opposition to Avempace's theories the majority of the time. Avempace starts with a good kinematic definition of motion and construes it as a force. According to Avempace regarding freely falling objects, what is moved as the heavy body falls, is the heavy body and what moves it downward is its 'gravity' or its 'form' or 'nature'.

Text 71 of Averroes' commentary on Aristotle's Physics contains a discussion on Avempace's theory of motion, as well as the following quotation from the seventh book of Avempace's lost work on physics:

"And this resistance which is between the plenum and the body which is moved in it, is that between which, and the potency of the void, Aristotle made the proportion in his fourth book; and what is believed to be his opinion, is not so. For the proportion of water to air in density is not as the proportion of the motion of the stone in water to its motion in air; but the proportion of the cohesive power of water to that of air is as the proportion of the retardation occurring to the moved body by reason of the medium in which it is moved, namely water, to the retardation occurring to it when it is moved in air."

"For, if what some people have believed were true, then the natural motion would be violent; therefore, if there were no resistance present, how could there be any motion? For it would necessarily be instantaneous. What then shall be said concerning the circular motion? There is no resistance there, because there is no cleavage of a medium involved; the place of the circle is always the same, so that it does not leave one place and enter another; it is therefore necessary that the circular motion should be instantaneous. Yet we observe in it the greatest slowness, as in the case of the fixed stars, and also the greatest speed, as in the case of the diurnal rotation. And this is caused only by the difference in perfection between the mover and the moved. When therefore the mover is of greater perfection, that which is moved by it will be more rapid; and when the mover is of lesser perfection, it will be nearer (in perfection) to that which is moved, and the motion will be slower."

Averroes writes the following comments on Avempace's theory of motion:

"Avempace, however, here raises a good question. For he says that it does not follow that the proportion of the motion of one and the same stone in water to its motion in air is as the proportion of the density of water to the density of air, except on the assumption that the motion of the stone takes time only because it is moved in a medium. And if this assumption were true, it would then be the case that no motion would require time except because of something resisting it for the medium seems to impede the thing moved. And if this were so, then the heavenly bodies, which encounter no resistant medium, would be moved instantaneously. And he says that the proportion of the rarity of water to the rarity of air is as the proportion of the retardation occurring to the moved body in water, to the retardation occurring to it in air."

"And if this which he has said be conceded, then Aristotle's demonstration will be false; because, if the proportion of the rarity of one medium to the rarity of the other is as the proportion of accidental retardation of the movement in one of them to the retardation occurring to it in the other, and is not as the proportion of the motion itself, it will not follow that what is moved in a void would be moved in an instant; because in that case there would be subtracted from the motion only the retardation affecting it by reason of the medium, and its natural motion would remain. And every motion involves time; therefore what is moved in a void is necessarily moved in time and with a divisible motion; nothing impossible will follow. This, then, is Avempace's question."

What follows is also found in Text 71:

“This resistance offered to the moving body by the medium does not occur in the way Aristotle has established in the fourth book when he discussed the void. The velocity of a body is not inversely proportional to the density of the medium, but it is the retardation the motion is subject to by virtue of the medium, which is proportional to the density. If what Aristotle said was true, natural motion in a supposed void would not meet any resistance and it would not take time but be instantaneous. Also, the motion of the heavenly spheres, which do not traverse a medium, would occur instantaneously. We see these motions occurring with different finite velocities: the motion of the fixed stars is very slow; the daily motion is very fast. These differences in velocity are due to the fact that the movers of the spheres differ in nobility and the more noble a mover, the faster is the motion of the sphere moved by it.”

In relation to the example of the stone falling through the mediums air and water, Avempace also brings up an example of dust particles to explain his ideas on natural movements. Dust particles are suspended in the air and naturally fall slowly. Despite having enough power to go down, it is still insufficient to displace the air underneath it. From Text 71; Ernest A. Moody, who is a notable philosopher, medievalist, and logician, offered four main reasons in favor of the view that Avempace was at least a major thinker within the paradigm of the "Theory of an 'impressed force.'" The following points are cited from his argument:

1. "For Avempace...V = P - M, so that when M = 0, V = P. This opposes Aristotle's (supposed use of) V = P / M."

2. "Internal coherence with this "law of motion" requires, Moody believes, also a defense of the theory of an impressed force - as we find for exampled in Philopponus himself."

3. "Avempace's appeal to an 'impressed force' was also reflected in the fact that 'if we use modern terms, it might be said that the force of gravity, for Avempace, is not determined essentially as a relation between the masses of different bodies, but is conceived as an absolute indwelling power of self-motion animating the body like a soul."

4. "The theory of an 'impressed force' appears to have been upheld by Al-Bitrogi, who was influenced ins ideas by Avempace's disciple Ibn-Tofail."

Despite diverging from Aristotle's theory of motion, it appears that Avempace largely agrees with Aristotle's ideas on projectile motion. While there is no known account that lay's out Avempace's ideas over this topic, Avempace gives a short explanation in his commentary of Aristotelian Physics book 8. An interesting piece by Avempace on the theory of projectile motion comes from his example involving a magnet and iron filaments. Magnets present a problem with Aristotle's theory on projectile motion because nothing can be seen physically moving the iron. Avempace, however, believes that a magnet is more complicated than one might think. He presents the idea that the magnet actually moves the air which, in return, moves the iron.

The central theory of the mover and the moved can be seen not only in his work in physics, but also in his work in Philosophy.

Avempace was a critic of Ptolemy and he worked on creating a new theory of velocity to replace the one theorized by Aristotle. Two future philosophers supported the theories Avempace created, known as the Avempacean dynamics. These philosophers were Thomas Aquinas, a Catholic priest, and John Duns Scotus. Galileo Gallilei went on and adopted Avempace's formula and said "that the velocity of a given object is the difference of the motive power of that object and the resistance of the medium of motion" in the Pisan dialogue.

== Botany ==
Avempace is known to have made contributions to the field of botany in addition to philosophy and the physical sciences. His work, titled Kitab al-nabat (The Book of Plants) is a commentary influenced by the work De Plantis. In this commentary, Avempace discusses the morphology of various plants and attempts to classify them based on their similarities. He also writes about the reproductive nature of plants and their supposed genders based on his observations of palm and fig trees. Kitab al-nabat was written in Arabic and has most recently been translated into Spanish.

Avempace's book Kitāb al-Tajribatayn ‘alā Adwiyah Ibn Wāfid (Book of Experiences on Drugs of Ibn Wafid) is an attempt to classify plants from a pharmacological perspective. It is based on the work of Ibn al-Wafid, a physician and Avempace's predecessor, and is said to have influenced the later work of Ibn al-Baitar, a prominent Arab pharmacologist and botanist.

Avempace's work in botany is evident in his political works.

== Music ==
Recently, the web page Webislam, created by Spanish converts to Islam, reported that the score of the Nuba al-Istihlál of Avempace (11th century), arranged by Omar Metiou and Eduardo Paniagua, is very similar to Marcha Granadera (18th century), which is now the official anthem of Spain. That makes it the world's oldest song (about a thousand years old) used for the official anthem of a country.

== Tributes ==
In 2009, a crater 199k km (62 mi) from the South Pole of the Moon was designated The Ibn Bajja crater by the International Astronomical Union (IAU) in his honor.
