= Lacus Tenebrarum =

Surface feature on the Moon

- Coordinates: 86.71°S 87.67°W
- Diameter: 85 km (53 mi)

Lacus Tenebrarum (Latin tenebra, "darkness") is a small patch of the lunar surface that has been inundated by flows of lava, leaving a level patch with a lower albedo than the surrounding ground. It is located near the lunar south pole, which is illuminated by the sun only obliquely. It was named by the IAU on August 28, 2025.

The lacus lies between the prominent crater Drygalski and the south pole. A small crater called Ibn Bajja is adjacent to it. Cabeus crater is to the east and Kocher is to the west.

== See also ==
- Volcanism on the Moon
