= Bowen (crater) =

Crater on the Moon

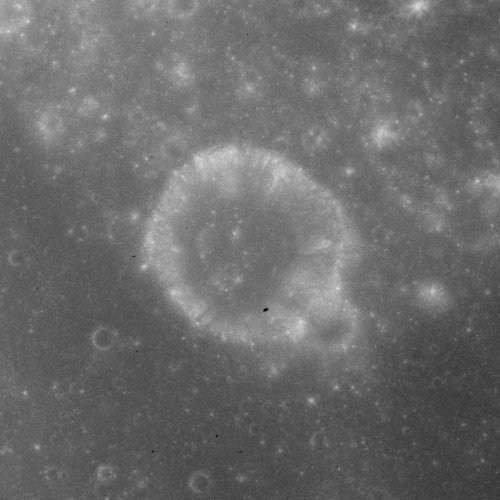
- Apollo 15 image
- Coordinates: 17.6°N 9.1°E
- Diameter: 8.09 km (5.03 mi)
- Depth: 0.95 km (0.59 mi)
- Colongitude: 351° at sunrise
- Eponym: Ira S. Bowen

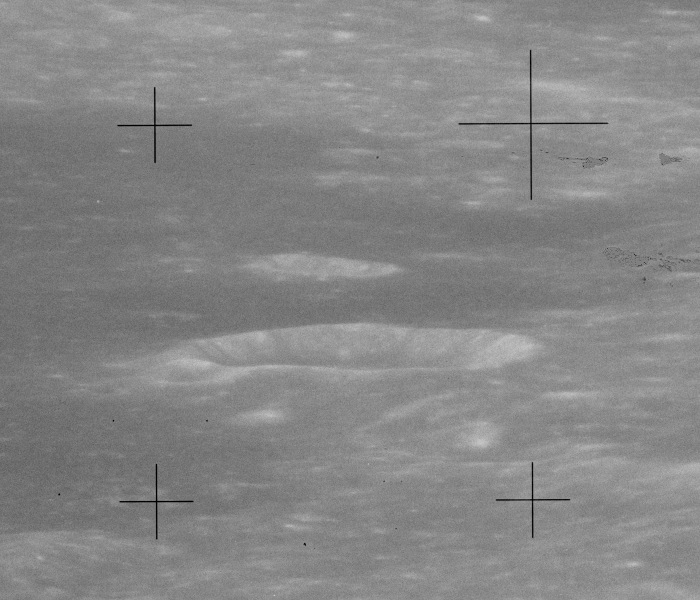
Apollo 15 image of Bowen crater, facing west-northwest

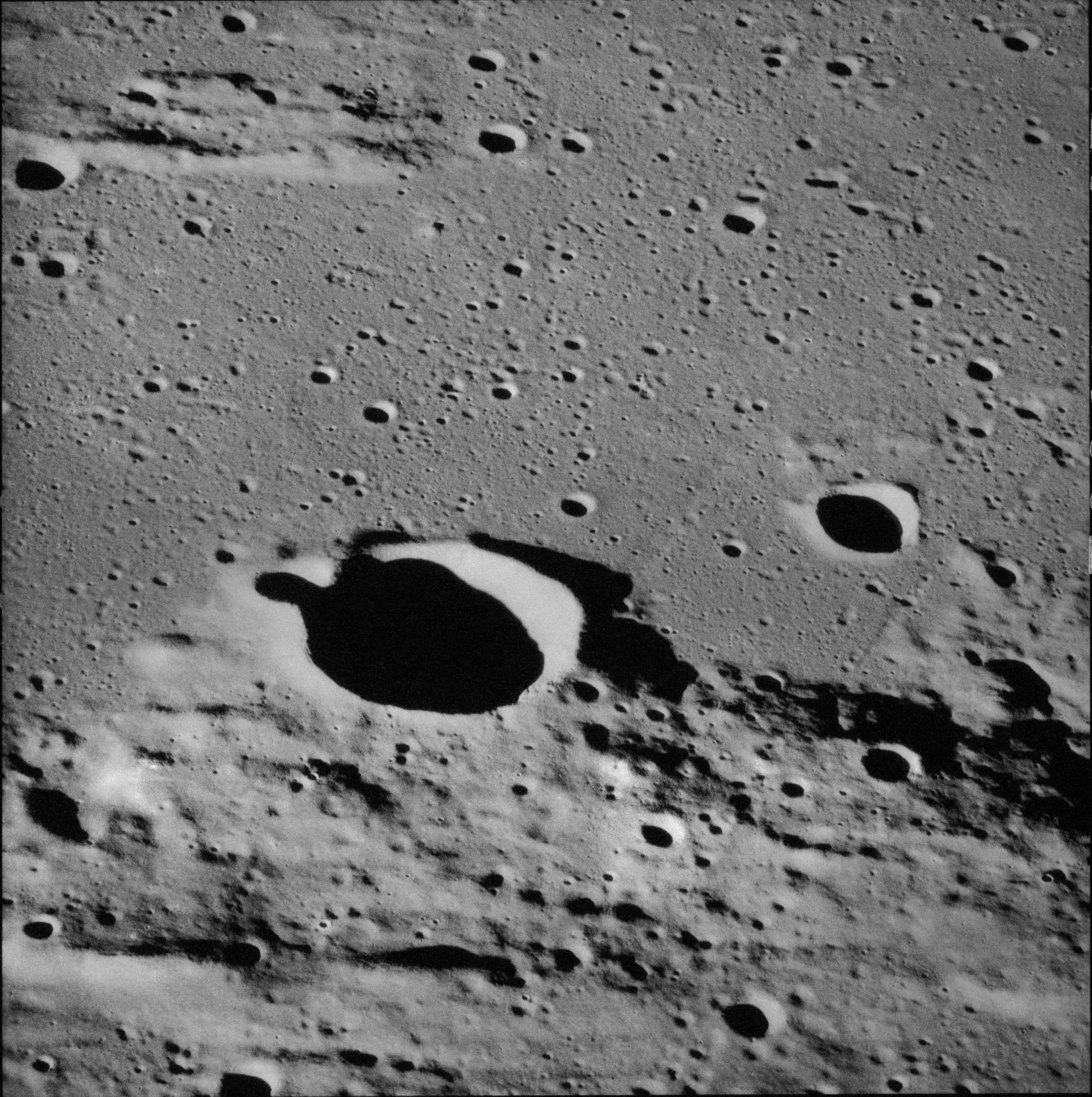
Apollo 17 image of Bowen crater at left. North is to the right.

Bowen is a small lunar impact crater that is located to the southwest of the Montes Haemus, on the edge of a small lunar mare named the Lacus Doloris. It is distinguished only by having a relatively flat floor, rather than being bowl-shaped like most small craters. The crater Manilius is located to the south, at the opposite shore of the Lacus.

This crater is named after American astronomer Ira S. Bowen. Its designation was formally adopted by the International Astronomical Union in 1973. Bowen was previously designated Manilius A, a satellite of Manilius.
