= Sinus Honoris =

Lunar impact crater

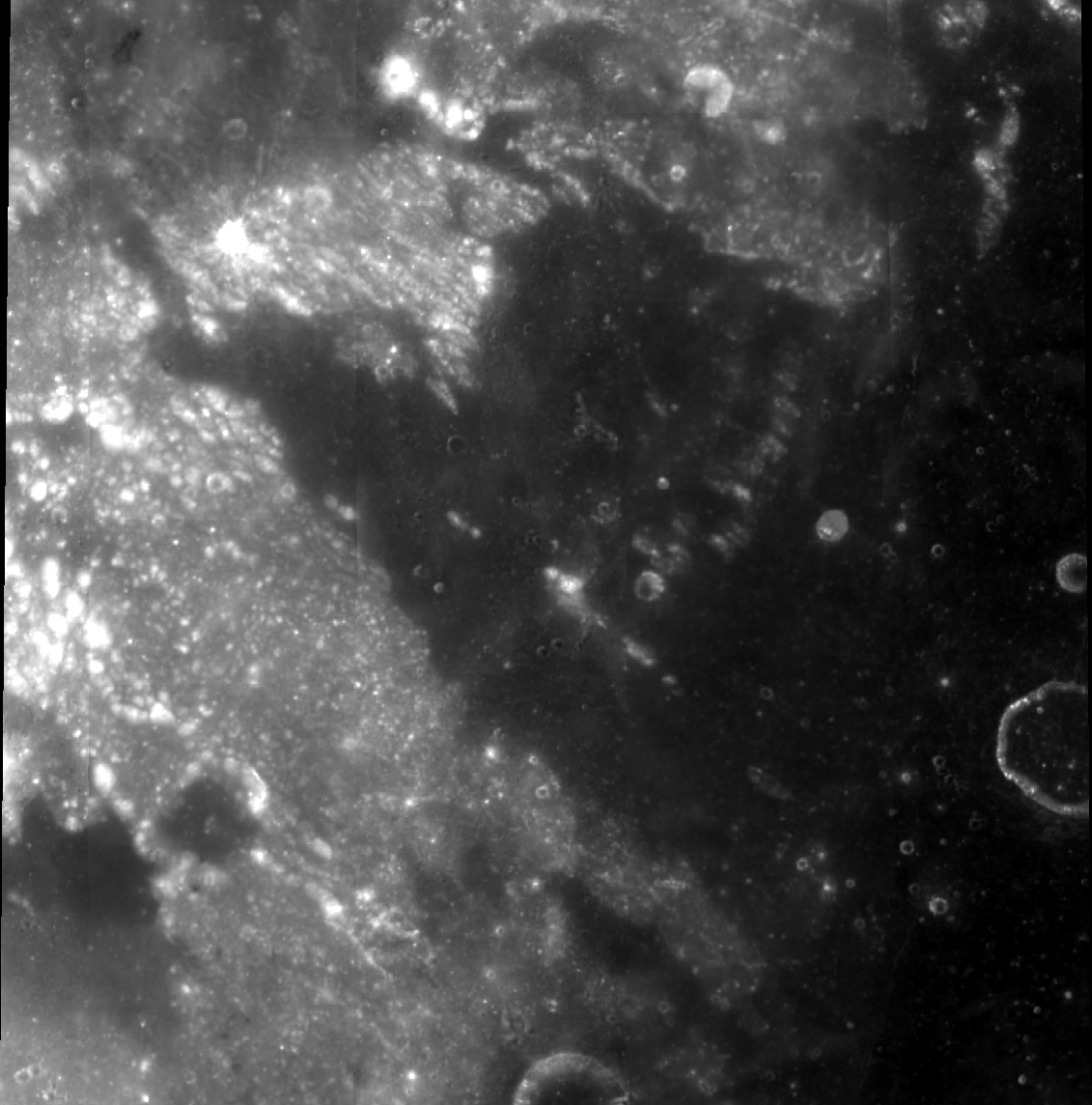
- Coordinates: 11.7°N 17.9°E
- Diameter: 112 km
- Eponym: Bay of Honour

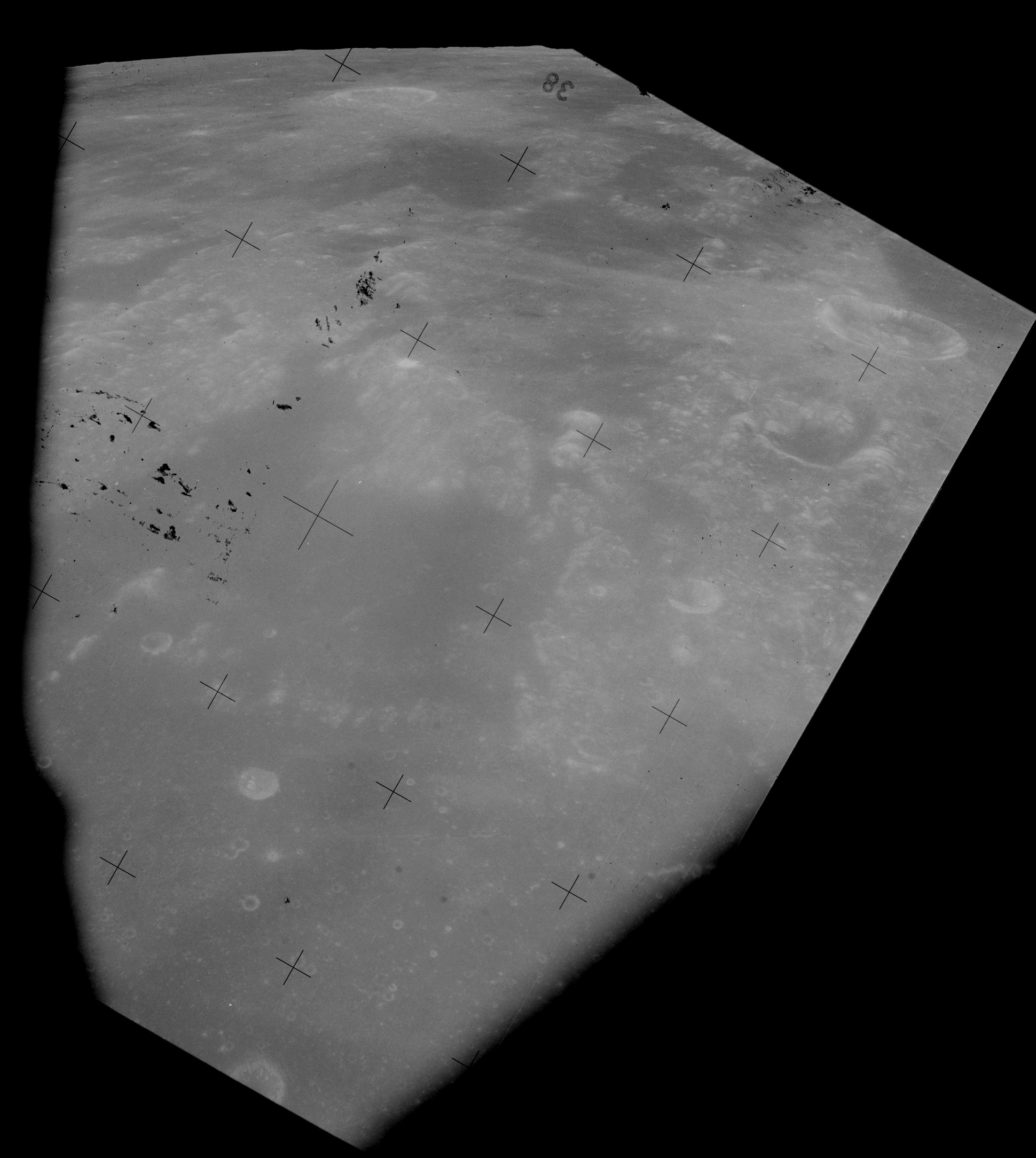
Oblique view from Apollo 15

Sinus Honoris /ˈsaɪnəs (h)ɒˈnɔːrɪs/ (Latin sinus honōris "Bay of Honour") is located along the western edge of the Mare Tranquillitatis located on the surface of the near side of the Moon. The selenographic coordinates of this feature are 11.7° N, 17.9° E. It has a diameter of 112 km.

Sinus Honoris has a wide mouth and is bordered by uneven terrain to the north and southwest. Where the bay joins the mare, rille systems extend to the north and south. The northern system is designated Rimae Maclear, after the crater Maclear just to the east of the bay. At the southern end of the bay entrance is the Rimae Sosigenes, named for the crater Sosigenes to the south. At the west end of the bay is a finger of mare surface that extends to the northwest for almost 100 km.

Telescopic observers of the full moon know the officially unnamed bright starlike craterlet northwest of Sinus Honoris, halfway between Julius Caesar and Menelaus. Its starlike appearance is also noticeable on the photographic version of chart LAC 60 (page 120) in The Clementine Atlas of the Moon (Ben Bussey / Paul D. Spudis).
