= Manilius (crater) =

Lunar impact crater

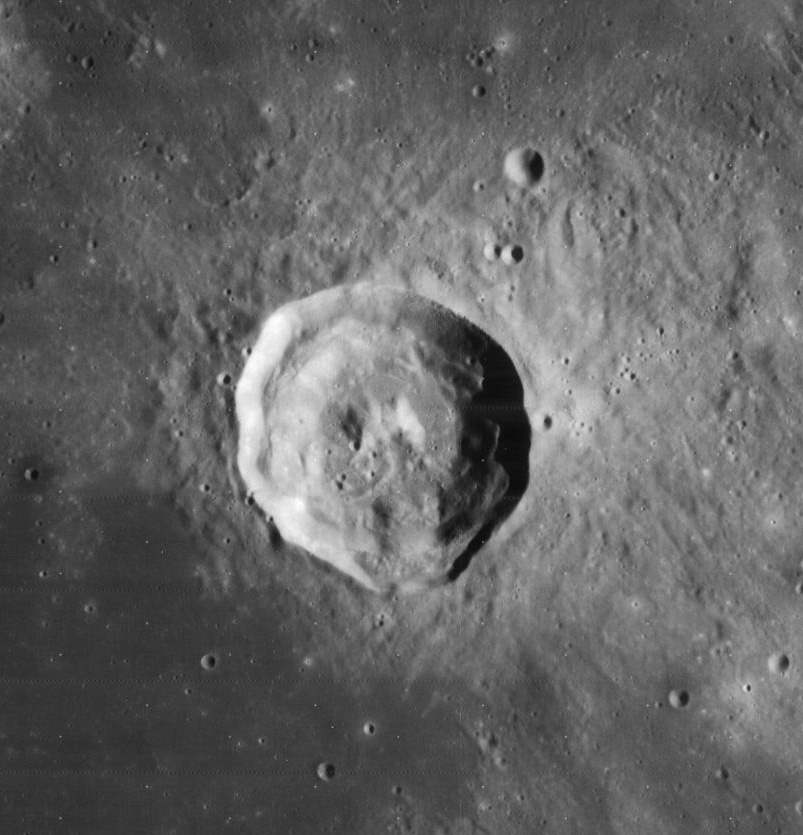
- Lunar Orbiter 4 image
- Coordinates: 14.5°N 9.1°E
- Diameter: 38.34 km (23.82 mi)
- Depth: 3.05 km (10,000 ft)
- Colongitude: 351° at sunrise
- Formation: Eratosthenian
- Eponym: Marcus Manilius

Manilius is a lunar impact crater on the northeast edge of Mare Vaporum. T. W. Webb described it as "a beautiful cavity" that "has a broad luminous terraced crater- and peak-bespeckled ring". Its diameter is 38 km.

== Description ==
Manilius has a well-defined rim with a sloping inner surface that runs directly down to the ring-shaped mound of scree along the base, and a small outer rampart. The small crater interior has a higher albedo than the surroundings, and it appears bright when the sun is overhead. Within the crater is a central peak formation near the midpoint. The infrared spectrum of pure crystalline plagioclase has been identified along the northern walls.

The crater possesses a ray system that extends for a distance of over 300 kilometers. Despite the presence of these rays, which generally indicate the age of the crater as Copernican, the crater is currently mapped as Eratosthenian age.

== Names ==
Manilius is named after the Roman astronomer Marcus Manilius. Its designation was adopted by the International Astronomical Union in 1935. Like many of the craters on the Moon's near side, it was given its name by Giovanni Riccioli, whose 1651 nomenclature system has become standardized. Earlier lunar cartographers had given the feature different names. Michael van Langren's 1645 map calls it "Isabellae Reg. Hisp." (Isabella, Queen of Spain), and Johannes Hevelius called it "Insula Besbicus" after the island in Turkey now known as İmralı.

== Satellite craters ==
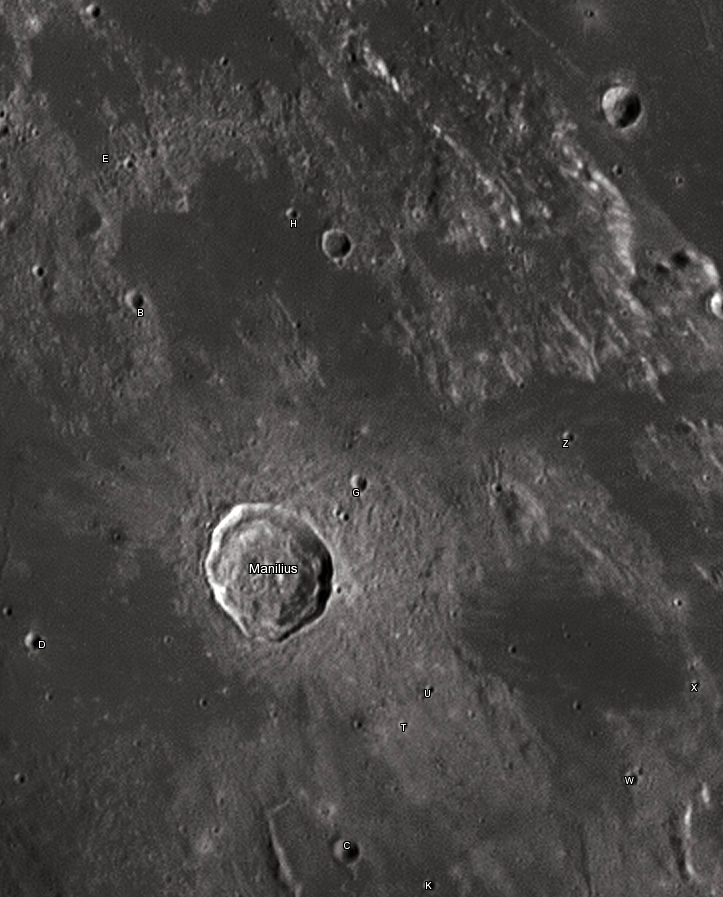
Manilius crater and its satellite craters taken from Earth in 2012 at the University of Hertfordshire's Bayfordbury Observatory with the telescopes Meade LX200 14" and Lumenera Skynyx 2-1

By convention these features are identified on lunar maps by placing the letter on the side of the crater midpoint that is closest to Manilius.

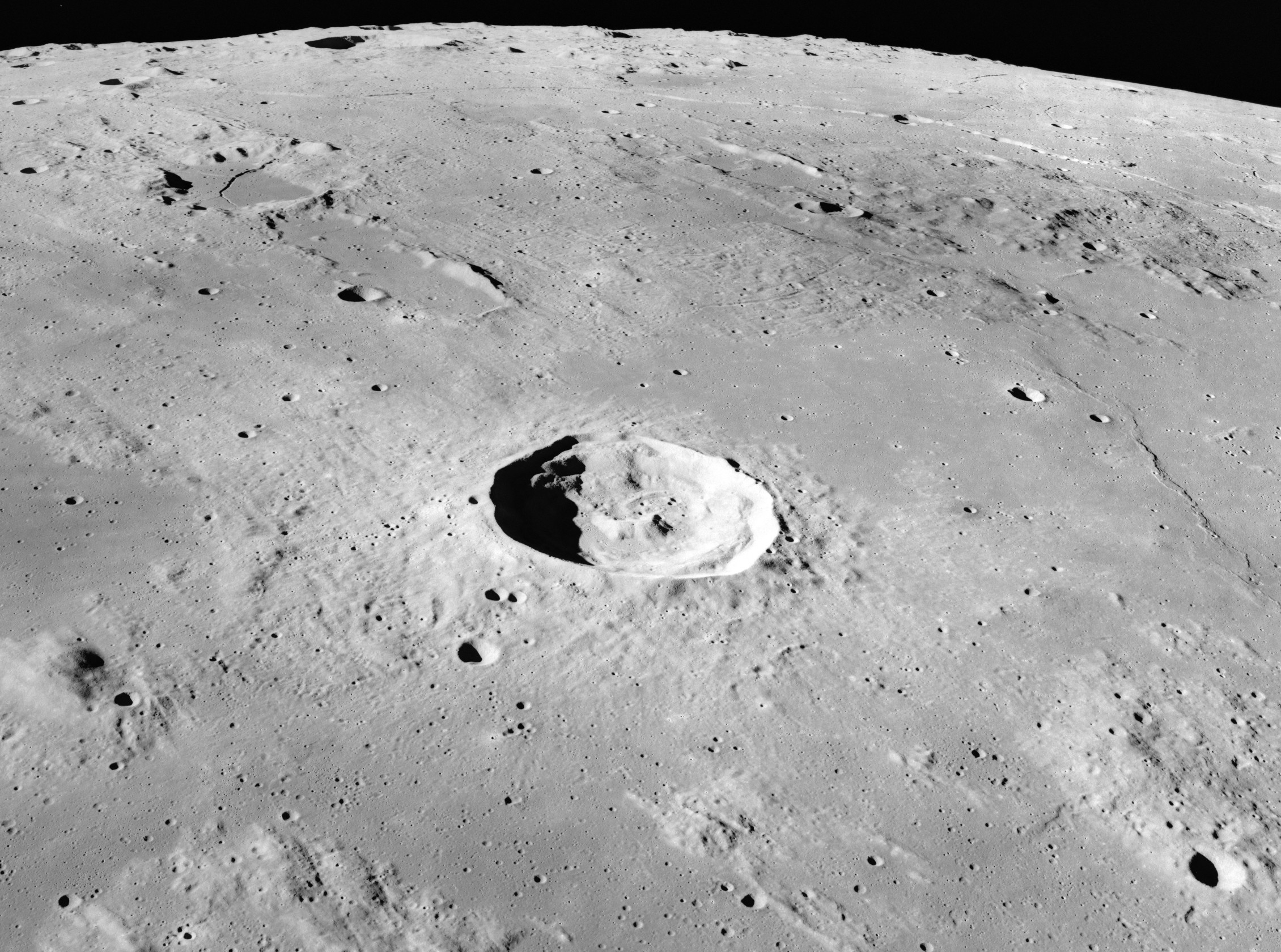
Oblique Apollo 17 image

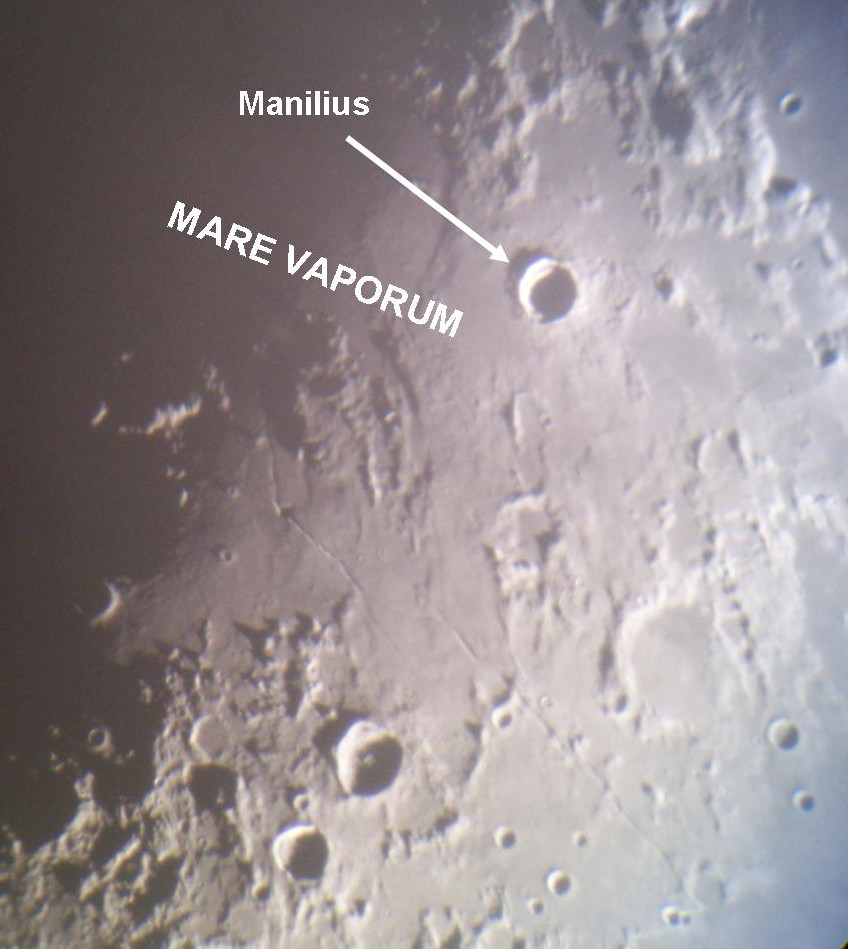
Location of the crater Manilius

Manilius	Latitude	Longitude	Diameter
B	16.6° N	7.3° E	6 km
C	12.1° N	10.4° E	7 km
D	13.2° N	7.0° E	5 km
E	18.3° N	6.4° E	49 km
G	15.5° N	9.7° E	5 km
H	17.8° N	8.6° E	3 km
K	11.9° N	11.2° E	3 km
T	13.4° N	10.6° E	4 km
U	13.8° N	10.8° E	4 km
W	13.4° N	12.9° E	4 km
X	14.4° N	13.4° E	3 km
Z	16.4° N	11.7° E	3 km

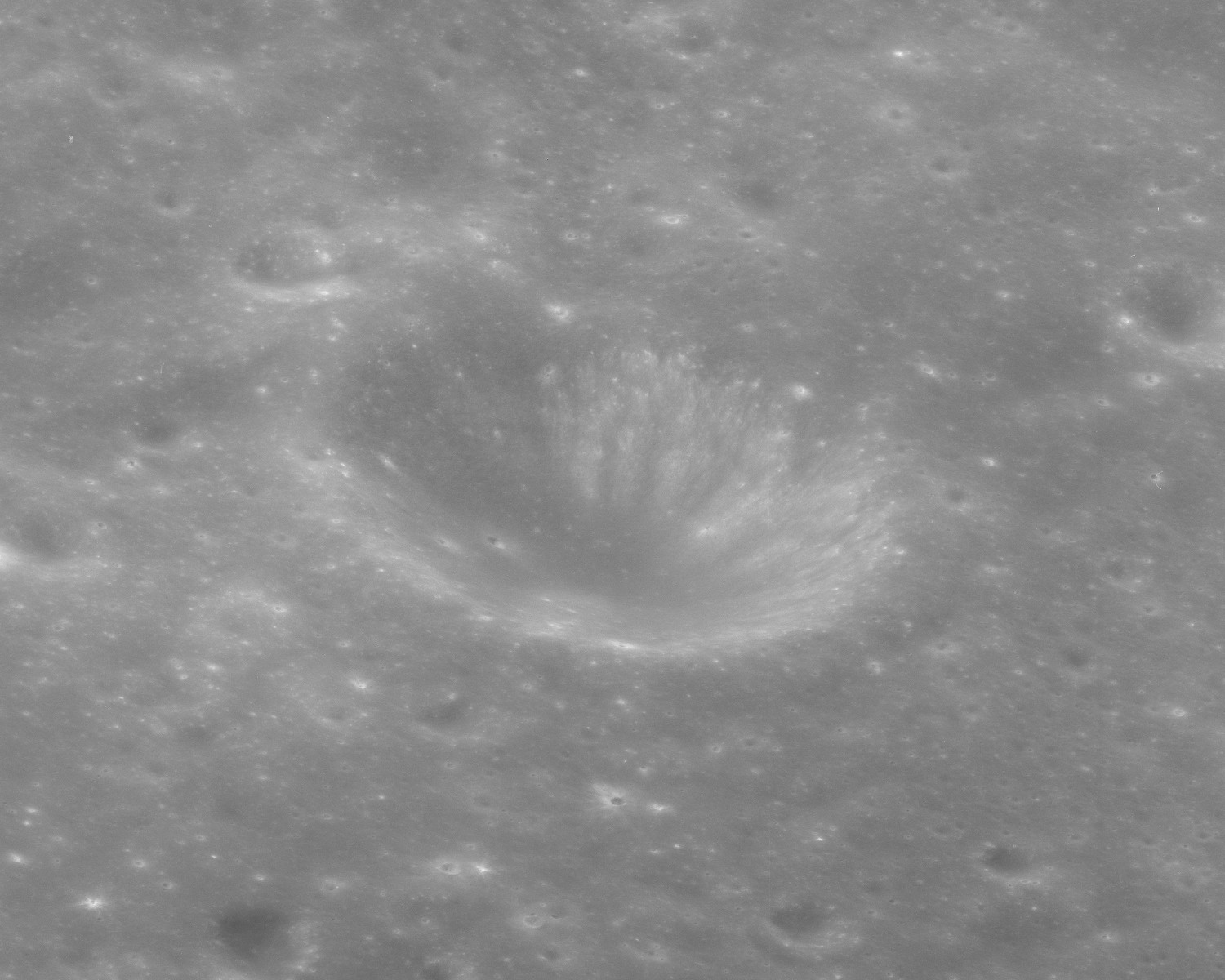
Oblique view of Manilius G, northeast of Manilius

The following craters have been renamed by the IAU.

- Manilius A — See Bowen.
- Manilius F — See Yangel'.
