= Sinus Fidei =

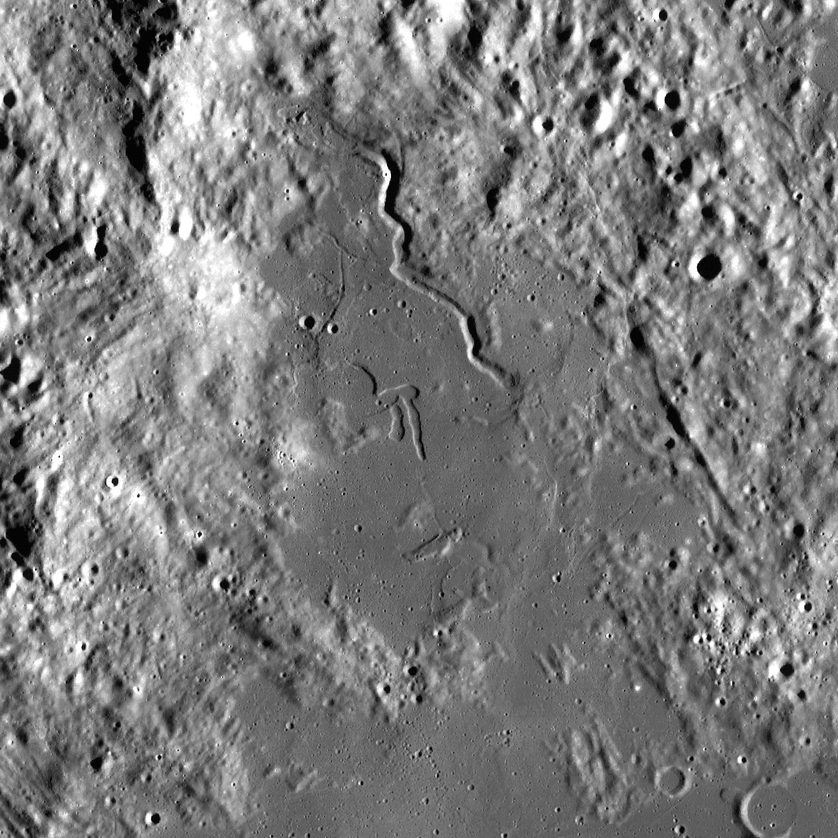
- Sinus Fidei
- Coordinates: 18.0°N 2.0°E
- Diameter: 70 km
- Eponym: Bay of Trust

Sinus Fidei /ˈsaɪnəs ˈfɪdiːaɪ/ (Latin sinus fideī "Bay of Trust") is a small basaltic mare feature in the north of Mare Vaporum on the Moon.

== See also ==
- Volcanism on the Moon
