= Sosigenes (crater) =

Lunar impact crater

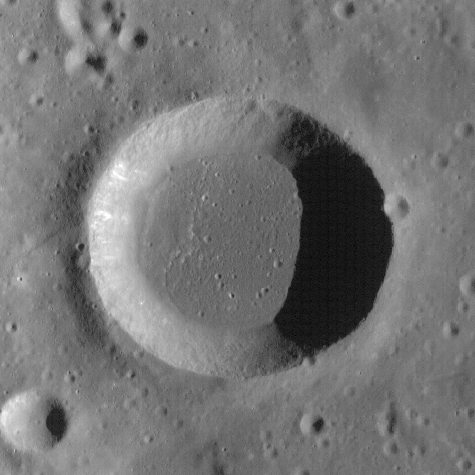
- LRO image
- Coordinates: 8.7°N 17.6°E
- Diameter: 17 km
- Depth: 1.5 km
- Colongitude: 342° at sunrise
- Eponym: Sosigenes of Alexandria

Sosigenes is a lunar impact crater on the west edge of Mare Tranquillitatis. Its diameter is 17 km. This formation was named after ancient Greek astronomer Sosigenes of Alexandria. It lies to the east of Julius Caesar, a large walled plain.

This impact dates to the Imbrian epoch of lunar geological history. The crater rim has a high albedo, making it relatively bright. It has a small central rise at the midpoint of the floor. To the east on the mare is a formation of parallel rilles designated the Rimae Sosigenes. These follow a course to the north, and have a length of about 150 kilometers. The small, bowl-shaped crater Sosignes A lies across one of these rilles.

== Satellite craters ==
By convention these features are identified on lunar maps by placing the letter on the side of the crater midpoint that is closest to Sosigenes.

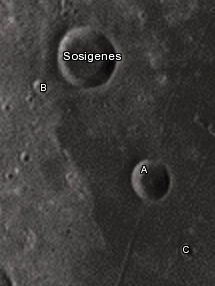
Sosigenes crater and its satellite craters taken from Earth in 2012 at the University of Hertfordshire's Bayfordbury Observatory with the telescopes Meade LX200 14" and Lumenera Skynyx 2-1

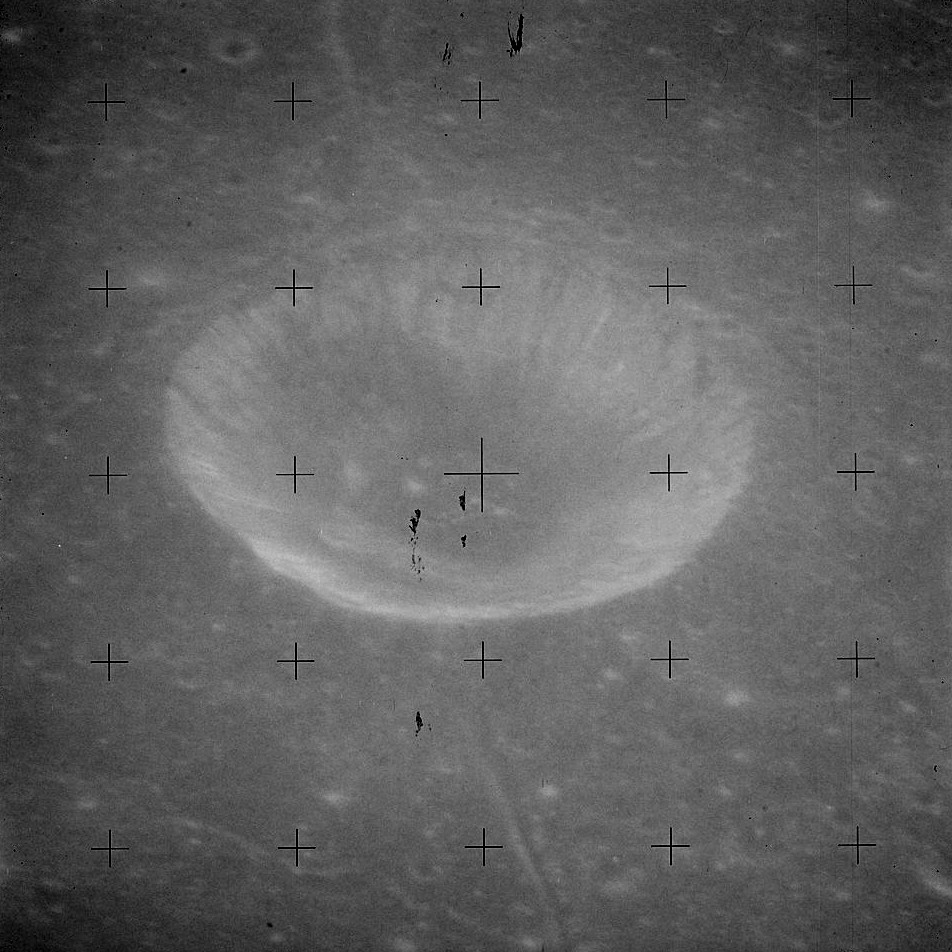
Sosigenes A

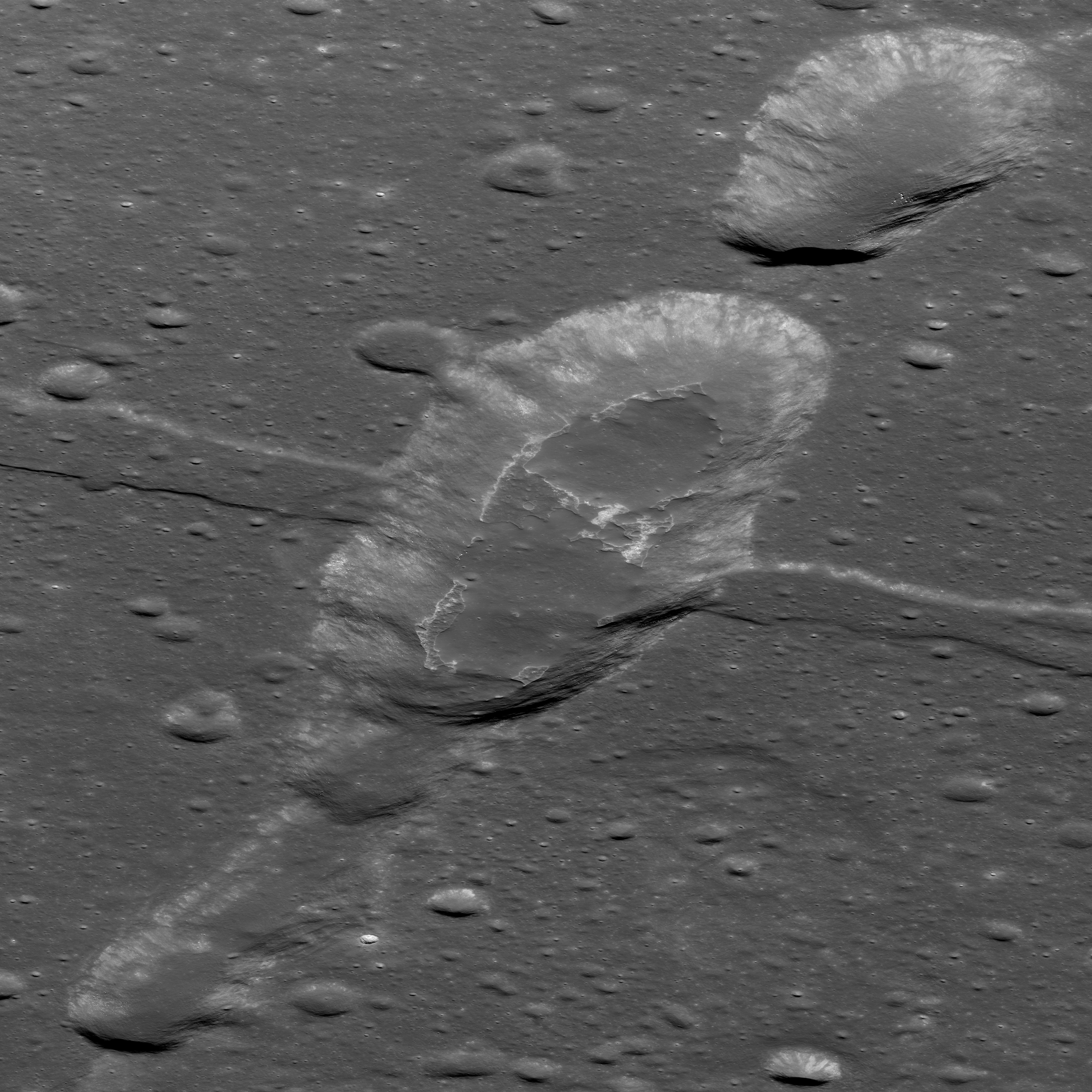
Irregular mare patch crossing Rima Sosigenes

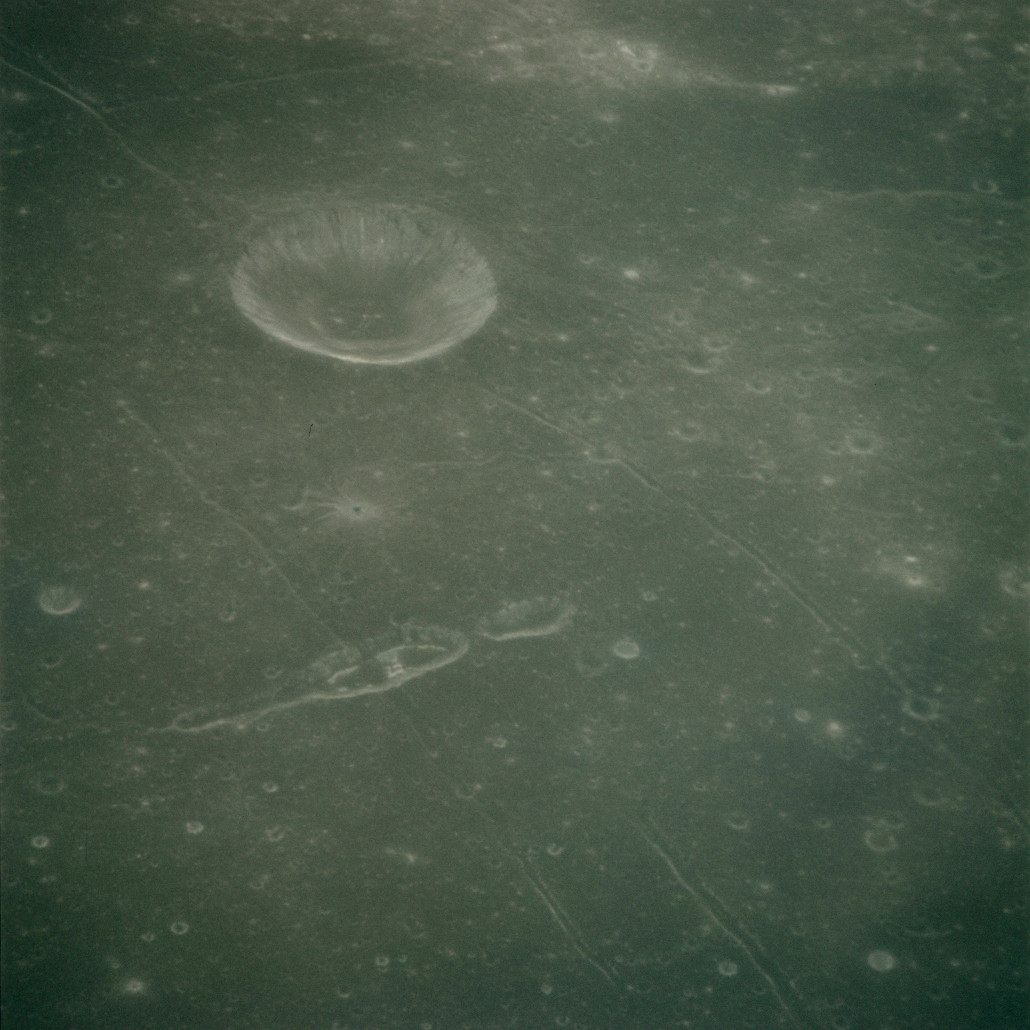
Rimae Sosigenes, the IMP above, and Sosigenes A crater

Sosigenes	Latitude	Longitude	Diameter
A	7.8° N	18.5° E	12 km
B	8.3° N	17.2° E	4 km
C	7.2° N	18.9° E	3 km
