= Ibn Bajja (crater) =

Crater on the Moon

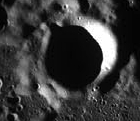
- Ibn Bajja (North at left hand side).
- Coordinates: 86.30°S 75.04°W
- Diameter: 11.97 km (7.44 mi)
- Depth: Unknown
- Colongitude: 45° at sunrise
- Eponym: Ibn Bajja

Ibn Bajja is a small lunar impact crater located about 199k km (62 mi) from the south pole of the Moon. The ridge north of Ibn Bajja is part of the elevated rim encircling the depressed area containing Cabeus.

This crater, along with 18 others, was named in 2009 by the International Astronomical Union (IAU). It was named for Ibn Bajja (c. 1095–1138), a Spanish-Arab astronomer and philosopher.
