= Mare Vaporum =

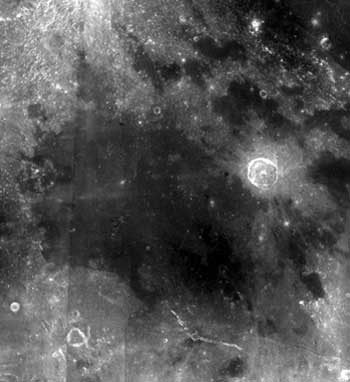
- Mare Vaporum. The crater Manilius can be seen as the bright circular object to the right of the mare. To the south Rima Hyginus is visible as a light colored thin line. In the upper left hand side of the photo is the mountain range Montes Apenninus.
- Coordinates: 13.3°N 3.6°E
- Diameter: 242.46 km (150.66 mi)
- Eponym: Sea of Vapors

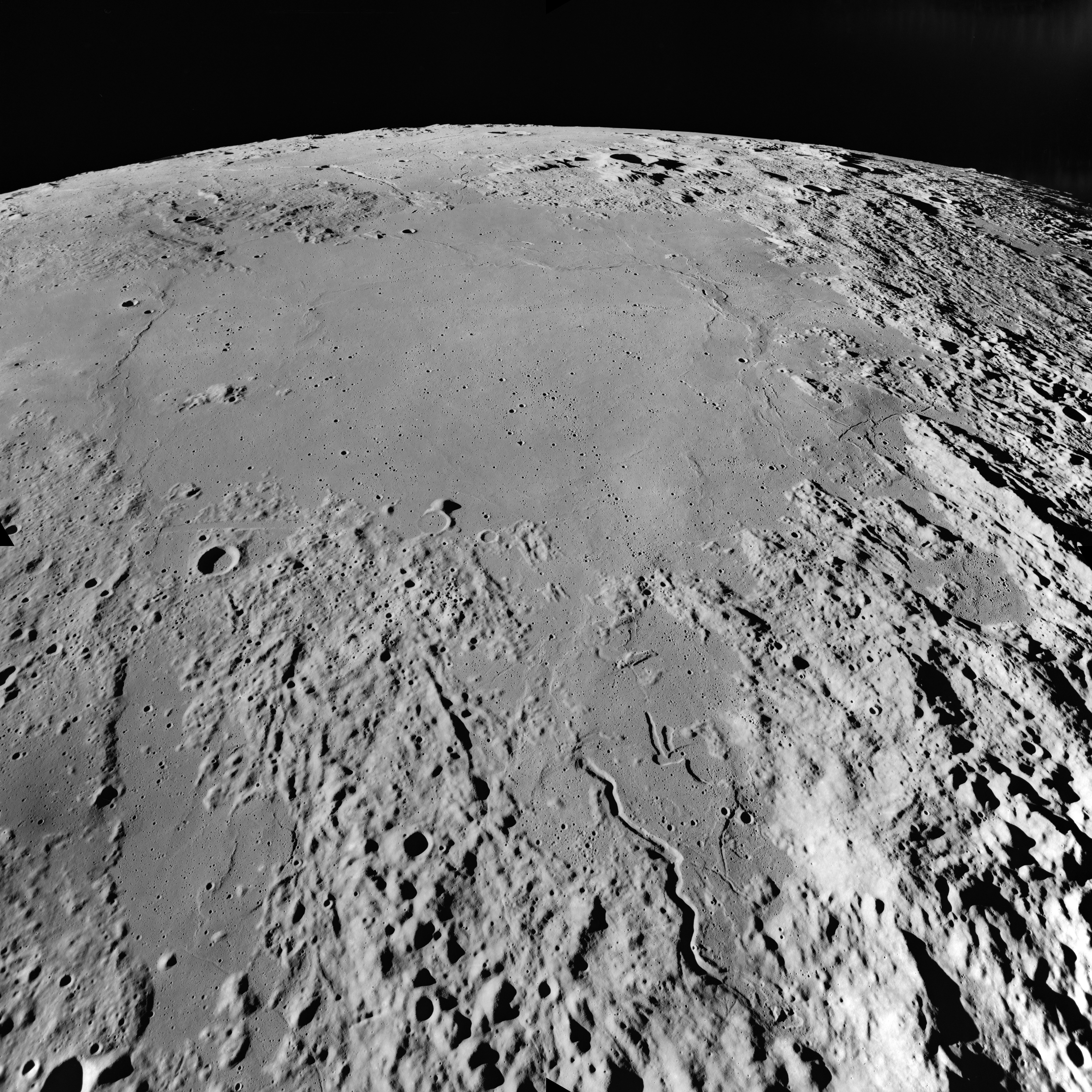
Oblique view facing south of Mare Vaporum from lunar orbit (Apollo 17)

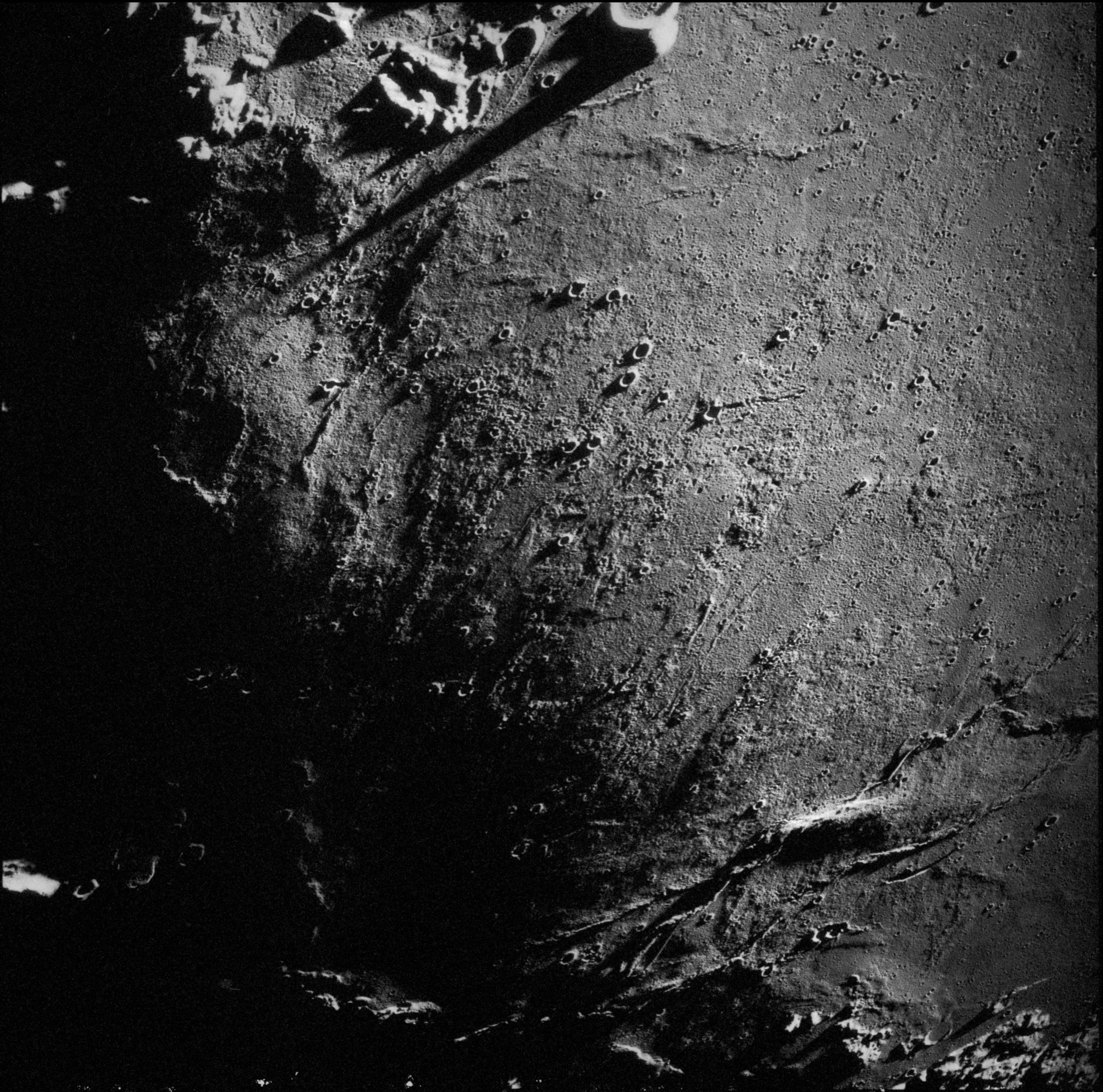
Western Mare Vaporum during sunrise, from Apollo 15

Mare Vaporum /væˈpɔːrəm/ (Latin vapōrum, the "sea of vapors") is a lunar mare located between the southwest rim of Mare Serenitatis and the southeast rim of Mare Imbrium. It was named by Giovanni Battista Riccioli in 1651.

== Location and size ==
The mare lies in an old basin or crater that is within the Procellarum basin. It is 242 kilometers (150 mi) in diameter and 55,000 km^{2} (21,000 sq mi) in area, and is bordered to the northeast by the mountain range Montes Apenninus. In the south of the mare is Rima Hyginus, a rille intersected by the crater Hyginus. The lunar material surrounding the mare is from the Lower Imbrian epoch, and the mare material is from the Eratosthenian epoch.

Lunar nearside with major maria and craters labelled.
