= Lyell (lunar crater) =

Crater on the Moon

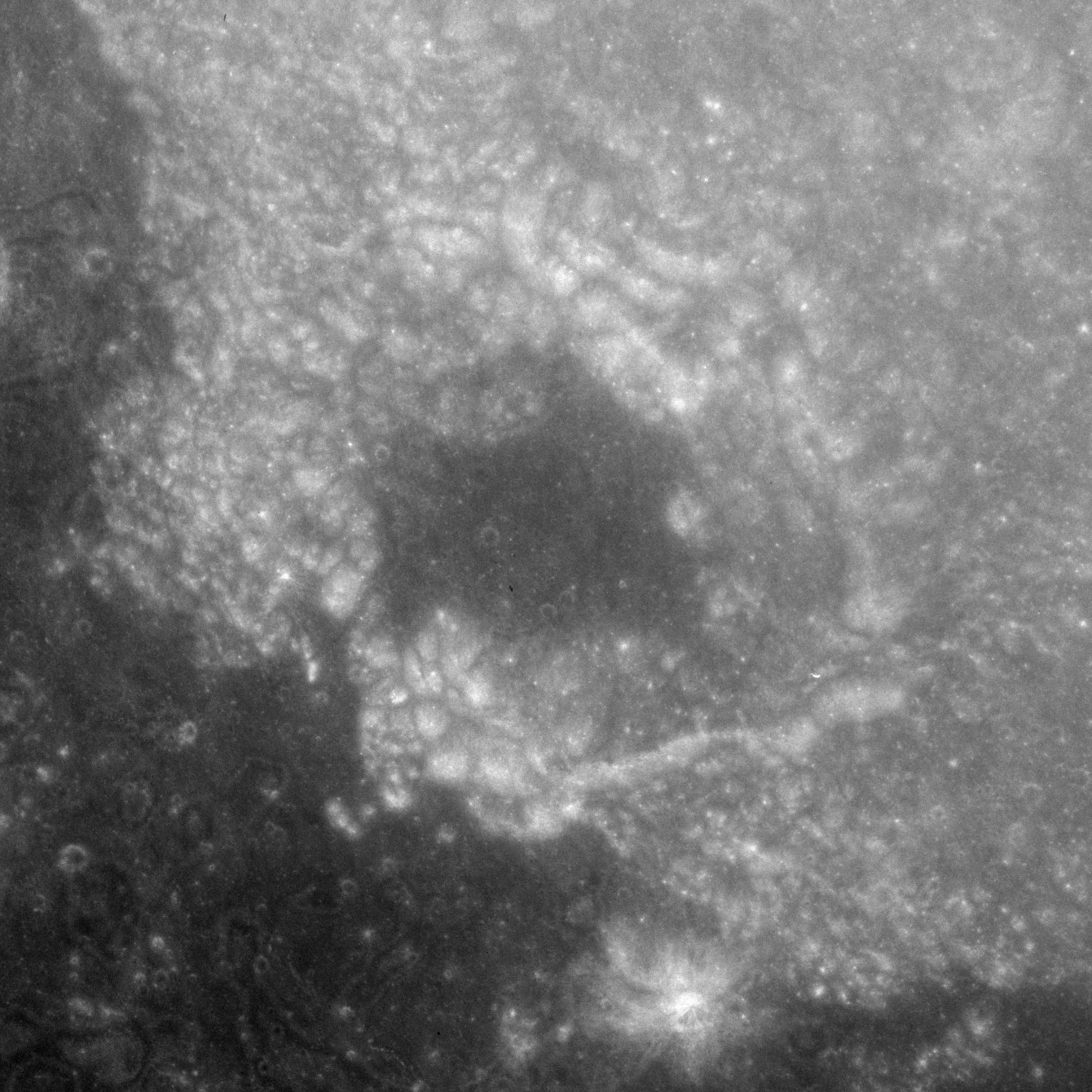
- Apollo 17 Mapping Camera image
- Coordinates: 13.6°N 40.6°E
- Diameter: 32 km
- Depth: 1.0 km
- Colongitude: 320° at sunrise
- Eponym: Charles Lyell

Lyell is a lunar impact crater that lies along the eastern edge of the Mare Tranquillitatis, at the northern arm of the bay designated Sinus Concordiae. It was named after Scottish geologist Charles Lyell. To the north along the edge of the lunar mare is the crater Franz. The region of terrain to the east of Lyell is named Palus Somni.

The outer rim of this crater is an irregular series of ridges in a roughly circular formation. There are multiple gaps through this rim, connected the interior to the mare in the west. The wall is at its thickest along the eastern side of the crater.

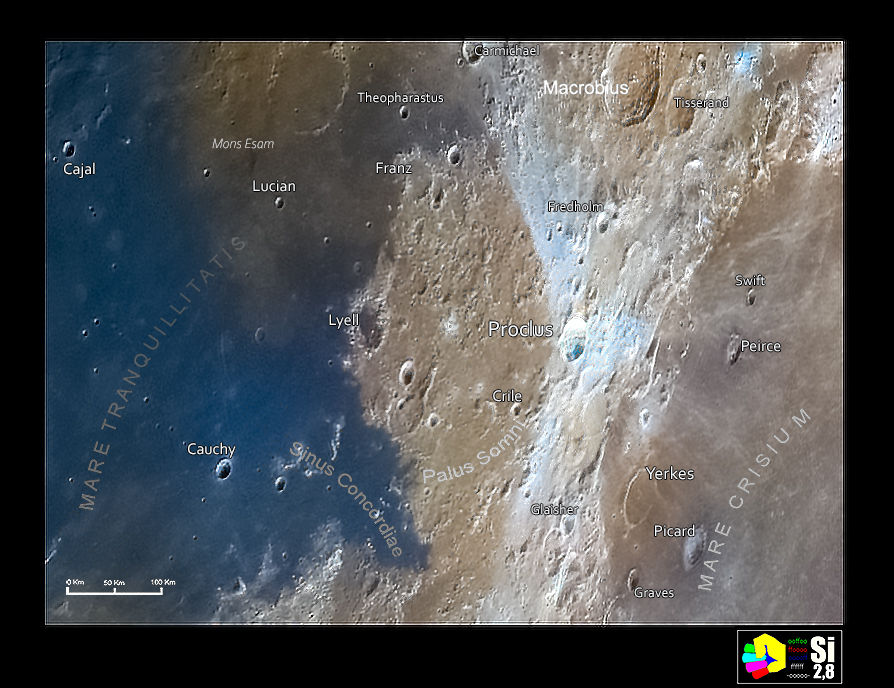
The Lyell area with mineral postprosessing

The interior floor has been resurfaced by lava, leaving a level, featureless surface that has no markings or impacts of note. The central region of the inner floor has a relatively low albedo compared to the surrounding terrain, giving it a dark appearance that matches the nearby mare.

== Satellite craters ==
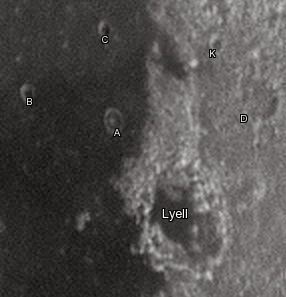
Lyell Crater and its satellite craters as viewed from Earth on a telescope at the University of Hertfordshire's Bayfordbury Observatory

By convention these features are identified on lunar maps by placing the letter on the side of the crater midpoint that is closest to Lyell.

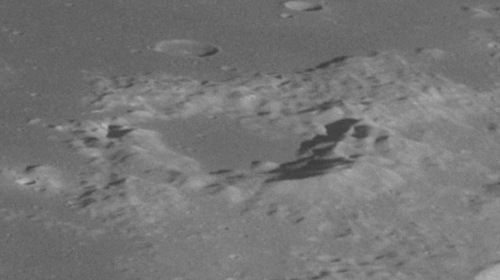
Oblique view from Apollo 11

Lyell	Latitude	Longitude	Diameter
A	14.3° N	39.6° E	7 km
B	14.4° N	38.4° E	5 km
C	15.2° N	39.4° E	5 km
D	14.7° N	41.5° E	18 km
K	15.3° N	40.9° E	5 km

The name Abduh was proposed for Lyell A, but this was not approved by the IAU.
