= Crile (crater) =

Crater on the Moon

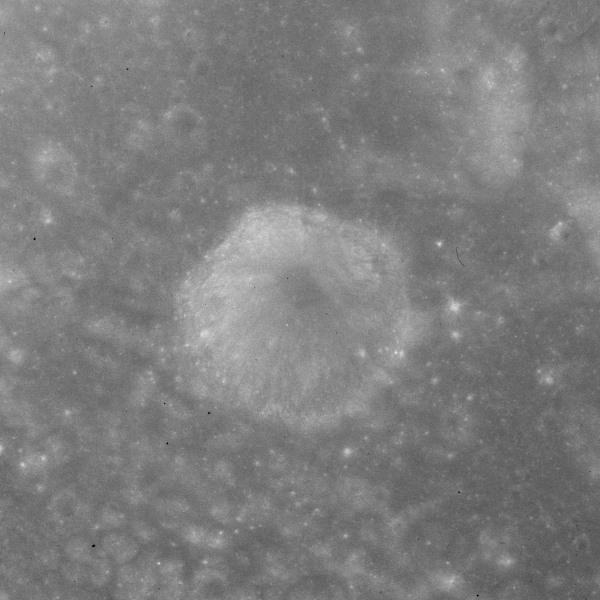
- Apollo 15 Mapping camera image
- Coordinates: 14.21°N 45.98°E
- Diameter: 9.30 km (5.78 mi)
- Depth: 1.6 km (0.99 mi)
- Colongitude: 314° at sunrise
- Eponym: George Washington Crile

Crile is a tiny lunar impact crater with a diameter of 9.30 km (5.78 mi). It is roughly circular and cup-shaped, with interior walls that slope down to the midpoint. The crater lies in the Palus Somni region, between the Mare Crisium to the east and Mare Tranquillitatis to the west.

Previously designated Proclus F, this crater is named for American surgeon George Washington Crile (1864-1943). Its designation was officially adopted by the IAU in 1976. Proclus itself is located to the north-northeast.
