= Da Vinci (lunar crater) =

Lunar crater

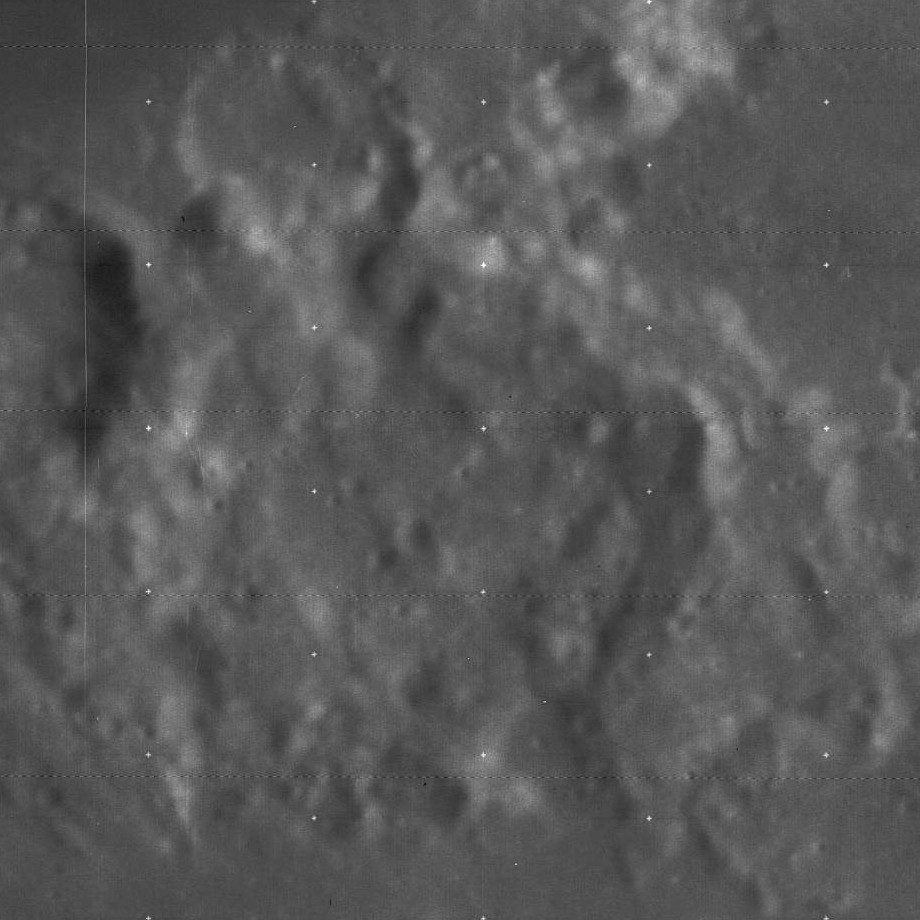
- Lunar Orbiter 4 image
- Coordinates: 9.1°N 45.0°E
- Diameter: 37.46 km (23.28 mi)
- Depth: Unknown
- Colongitude: 316° at sunrise
- Eponym: Leonardo da Vinci

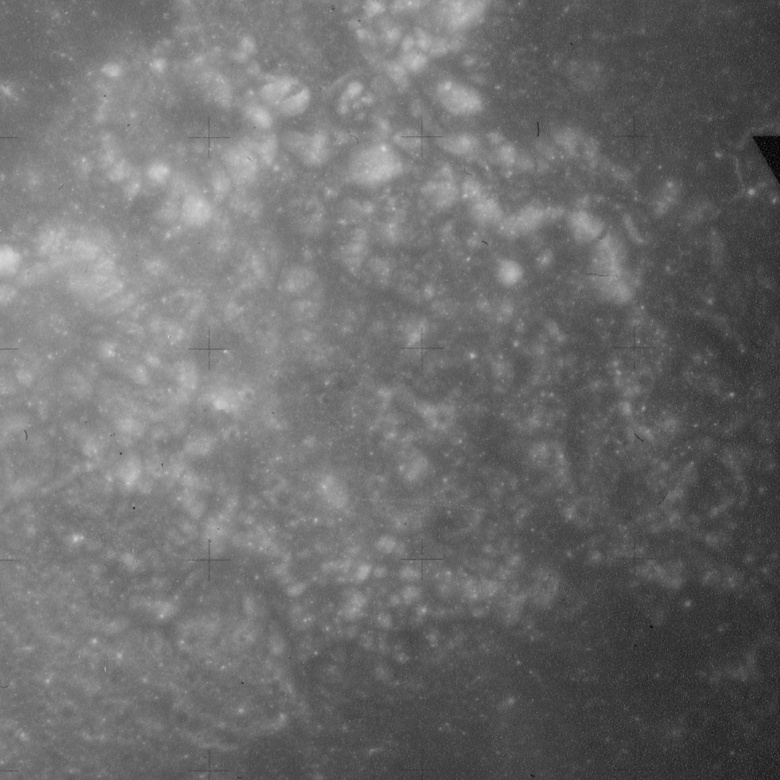
Apollo 15 mapping camera image at high sun angle showing differences in albedo rather than topography

da Vinci is a degraded lunar impact crater that is located in the eastern part of the Moon, to the northwest of Mare Fecunditatis. It lies along the eastern shore of the Sinus Concordiae, a bay along the eastern edge of Mare Tranquillitatis. Nearby craters include Watts to the southeast and Lawrence to the southwest, both smaller in dimension than da Vinci.

This formation has been heavily damaged and reshaped until it is scarcely recognizable as a crater. Sections of the low eastern rim and a portion to the northwest are still somewhat intact, although they more closely resemble curved ridges than a crater wall. There are gaps in the rim to the south and north, and the interior is irregular with portions having been resurfaced.

The terrain along the northern and western exterior of the crater is irregular and hilly. A low ridge to the southeast runs to the vicinity of Watts.

This formation is named after the Italian artist, inventor, and mathematician, Leonardo da Vinci (1452-1519). His name was introduced into lunar nomenclature by the Austrian geographer Karl Peucker. Its designation was officially adopted by the International Astronomical Union in 1935.

== Satellite craters ==
By convention these features are identified on lunar maps by placing the letter on the side of the crater midpoint that is closest to da Vinci.

da Vinci	Latitude	Longitude	Diameter
A	9.7° N	44.2° E	18 km

== See also ==
- 3000 Leonardo (asteroid named for Leonardo da Vinci)
