= Cauchy (crater) =

Crater on the Moon

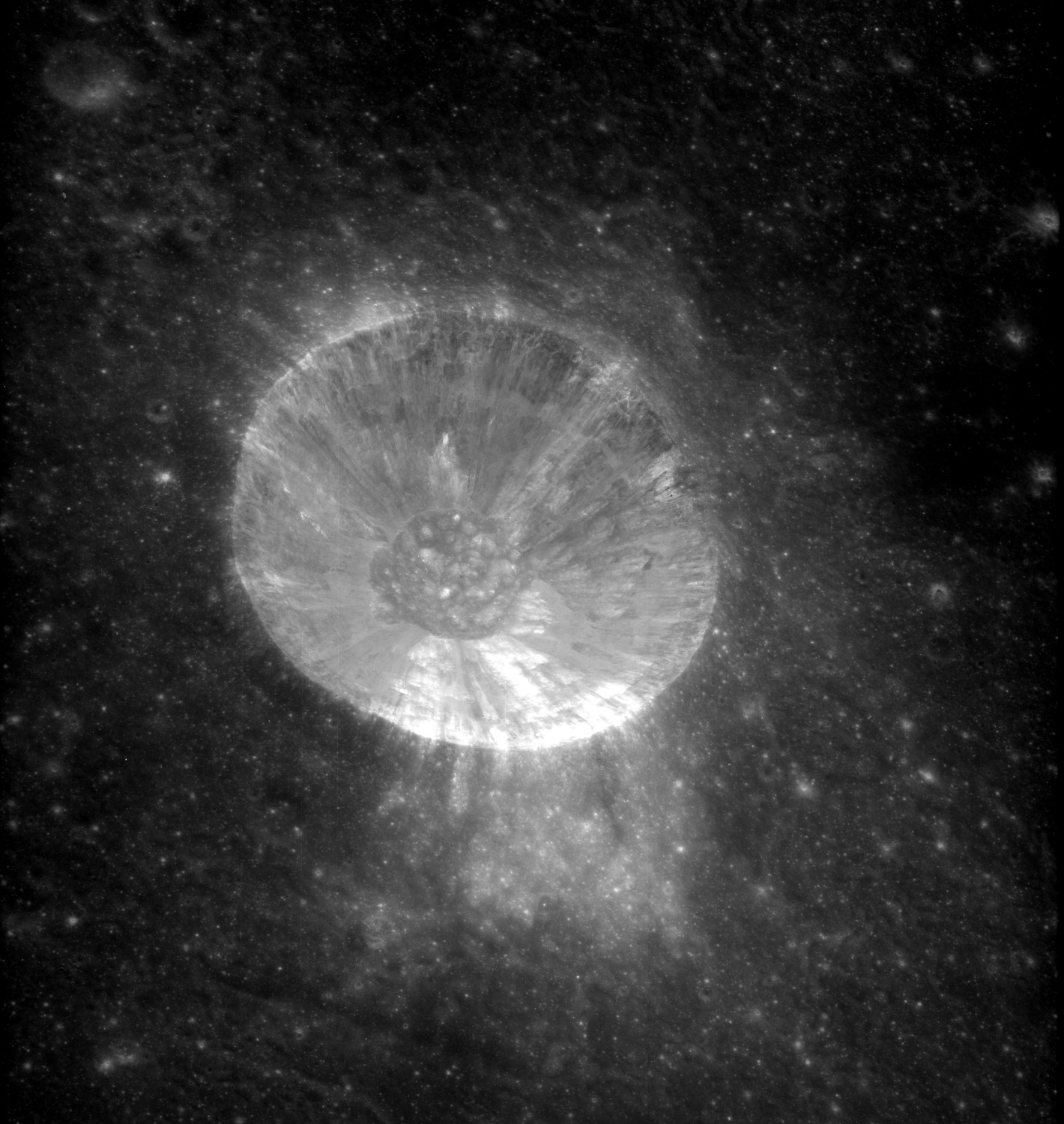
- Apollo 17 image, with north at bottom
- Coordinates: 9.56°N 38.63°E
- Diameter: 11.80 km (7.33 mi)
- Depth: 2.67 km (1.66 mi)
- Colongitude: 321° at sunrise
- Formation: Copernican
- Eponym: Augustin L. Cauchy

Cauchy is a small lunar impact crater on the eastern Mare Tranquillitatis. On the lunar geologic timescale, this formation dates to the Copernican period. It is circular, with a small interior floor at the midpoint of the sloping inner walls. The rim shows some asymmetry due to an oblique impact, with the width along the projectile direction being 11.8 km and across its perpendicular being 12.3 km. Due to the high albedo of this bowl-shaped formation, it is particularly prominent at full Moon.

The crater was named after French mathematician Augustin-Louis Cauchy (1789–1857). His name was introduced into lunar nomenclature by Edmund Neison in 1878. Its designation was officially adopted by the International Astronomical Union in 1935.

== Nearby features ==
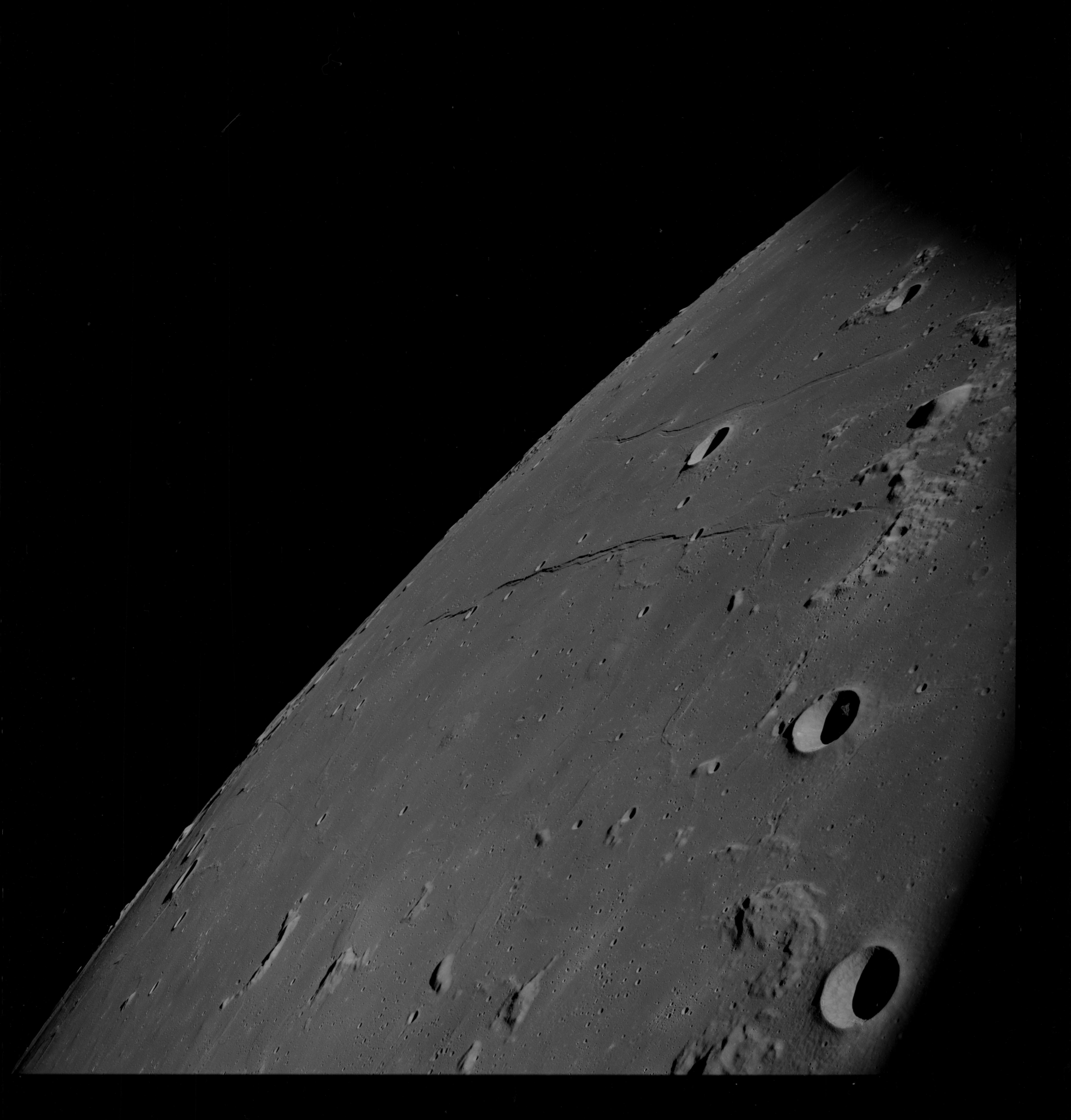
Cauchy is in the upper right quadrant between Rupes Cauchy and Rimae Cauchy in this Apollo 8 image. Omega and Tau Cauchy are visible below the Rupes Cauchy.

Cauchy lies between the Rupes Cauchy and the Rimae Cauchy. To the south of Cauchy is a 150-km fault in the surface named the Rupes Cauchy, which forms a series of cliffs or escarpments. This wall roughly parallels the Rima Cauchy to the north. Rupes Cauchy was named Fossa Casalis in a 1974 map, but this was not approved by the IAU. The term Rupes was used in favor of Fossa for the names of lunar scarps.

South of Rupes Cauchy are two lunar domes designated Omega (ω) Cauchy and Tau (τ) Cauchy. They lie to the south and southwest of Cauchy respectively. Each lunar dome has a small depression at its crest. As such domes are thought to be volcanic in nature, it appears likely that these were created by an eruption. This is in contrast to most lunar craters, which are now believed to be created by impacts.

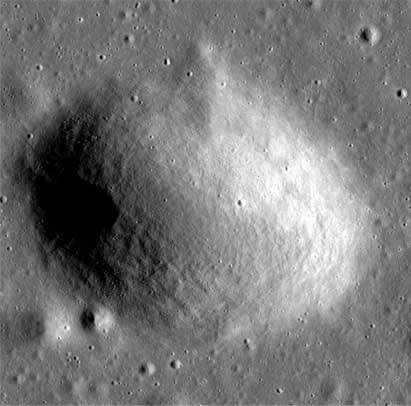
LRO image of Donna

The vent at the top of Omega Cauchy is called Donna. With a diameter of 1.84 km (1.14 mi), this feature is sufficiently small that it requires a 150 mm (6 in) telescope to resolve. The vent designation is an Italian female given name, and does not refer to a specific person. It was officially approved by the International Astronomical Union in 1979.

To the north of Cauchy is the rille named Rima Cauchy, a 210-kilometer-long graben. Rima Cauchy was named Fossa Cauchy in a 1974 map, but term Rima was used in favor of Fossa for the names of lunar rilles.

== Satellite craters ==
By convention these features are identified on lunar maps by placing the letter on the side of the crater midpoint that is closest to Cauchy.

Cauchy	Latitude	Longitude	Diameter
A	12.1° N	37.9° E	8 km
B	9.8° N	35.8° E	6 km
C	8.2° N	38.9° E	4 km
D	10.0° N	40.3° E	9 km
E	8.9° N	38.6° E	4 km
F	9.6° N	36.8° E	4 km
M	7.6° N	35.1° E	5 km
U	8.8° N	42.3° E	5 km
V	9.0° N	41.5° E	5 km
W	10.6° N	41.6° E	4 km

Cauchy A is shown as Hussein on some lunar maps based on Apollo 15 photographs, but the name was not approved by the IAU, which officially designated the crater name in 2006.

== Gallery ==
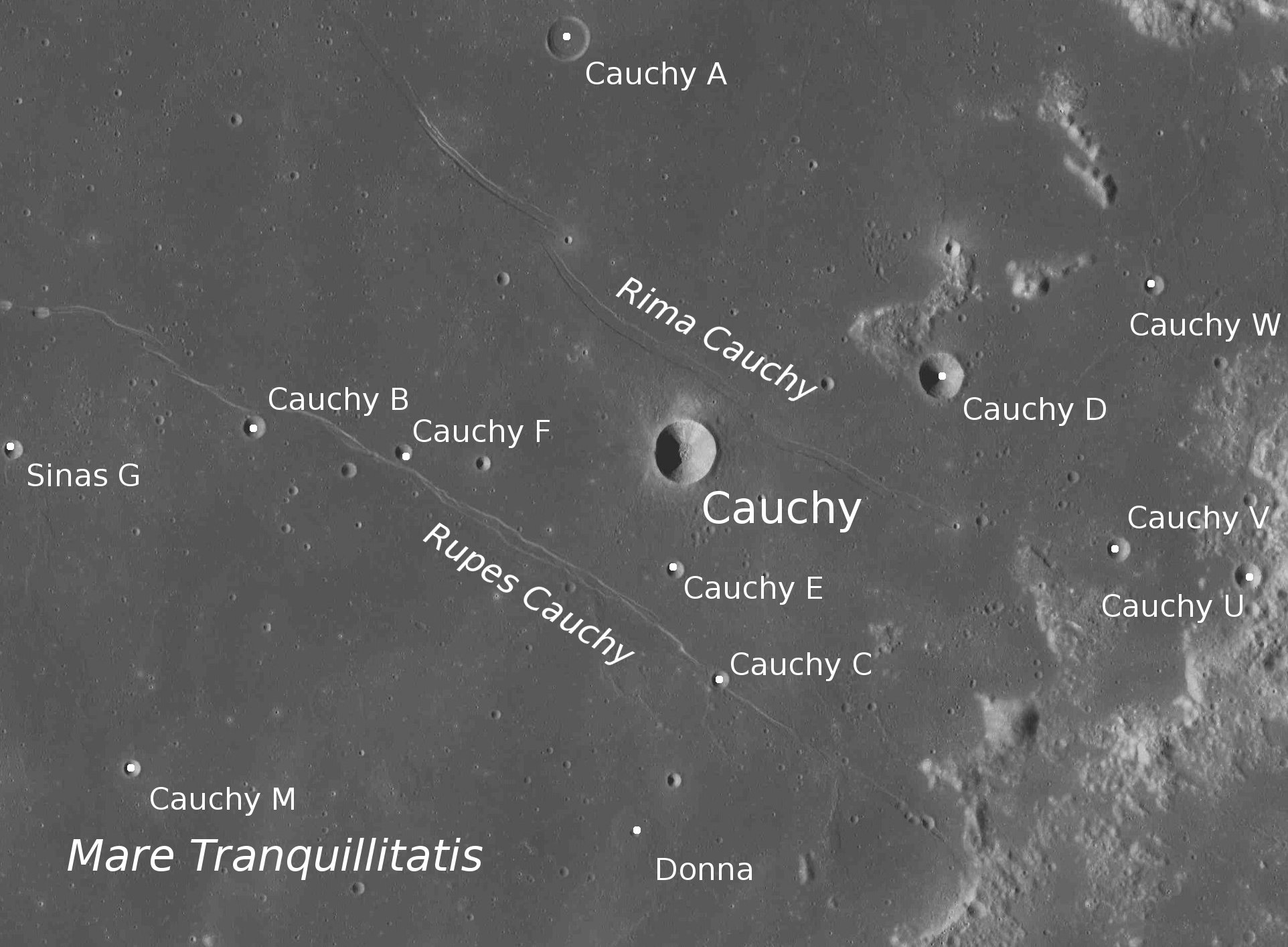
Selenographic features around Cauchy as well as its satellite craters and the small Donna Crater to the south

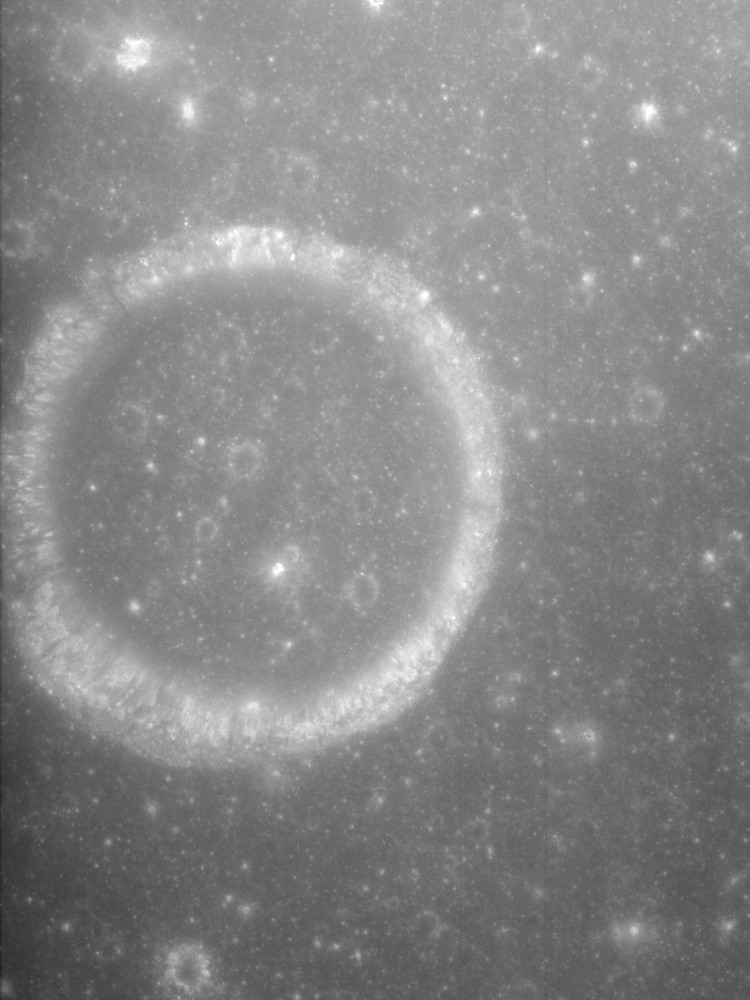
Cauchy A crater

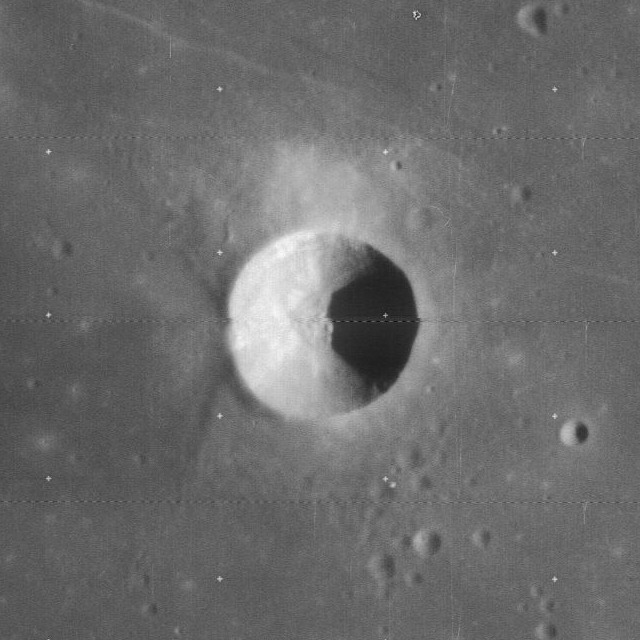
Lunar Orbiter 4 image
