= Rupes Cauchy =

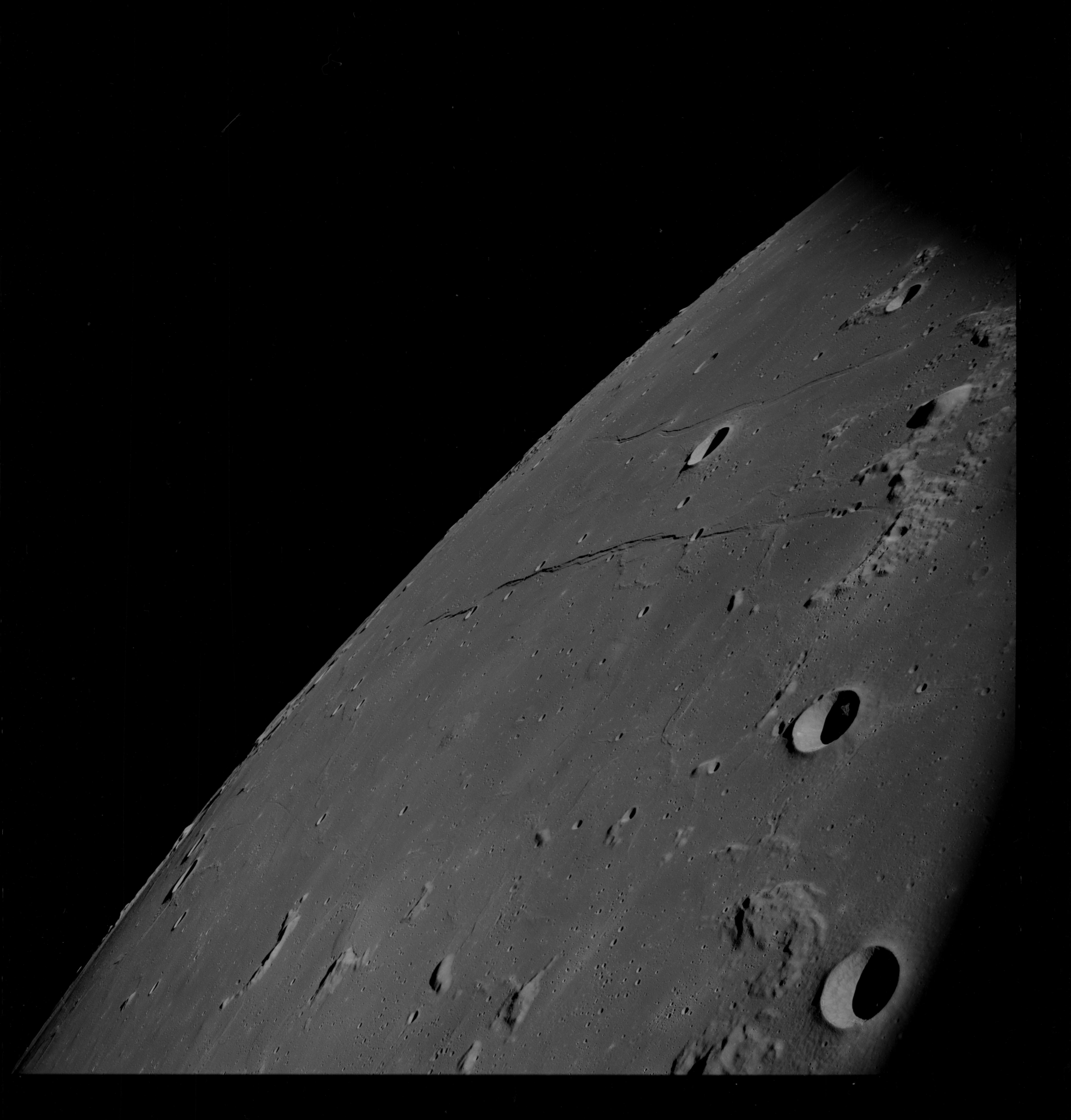
Rupes Cauchy, photographed by Apollo 8

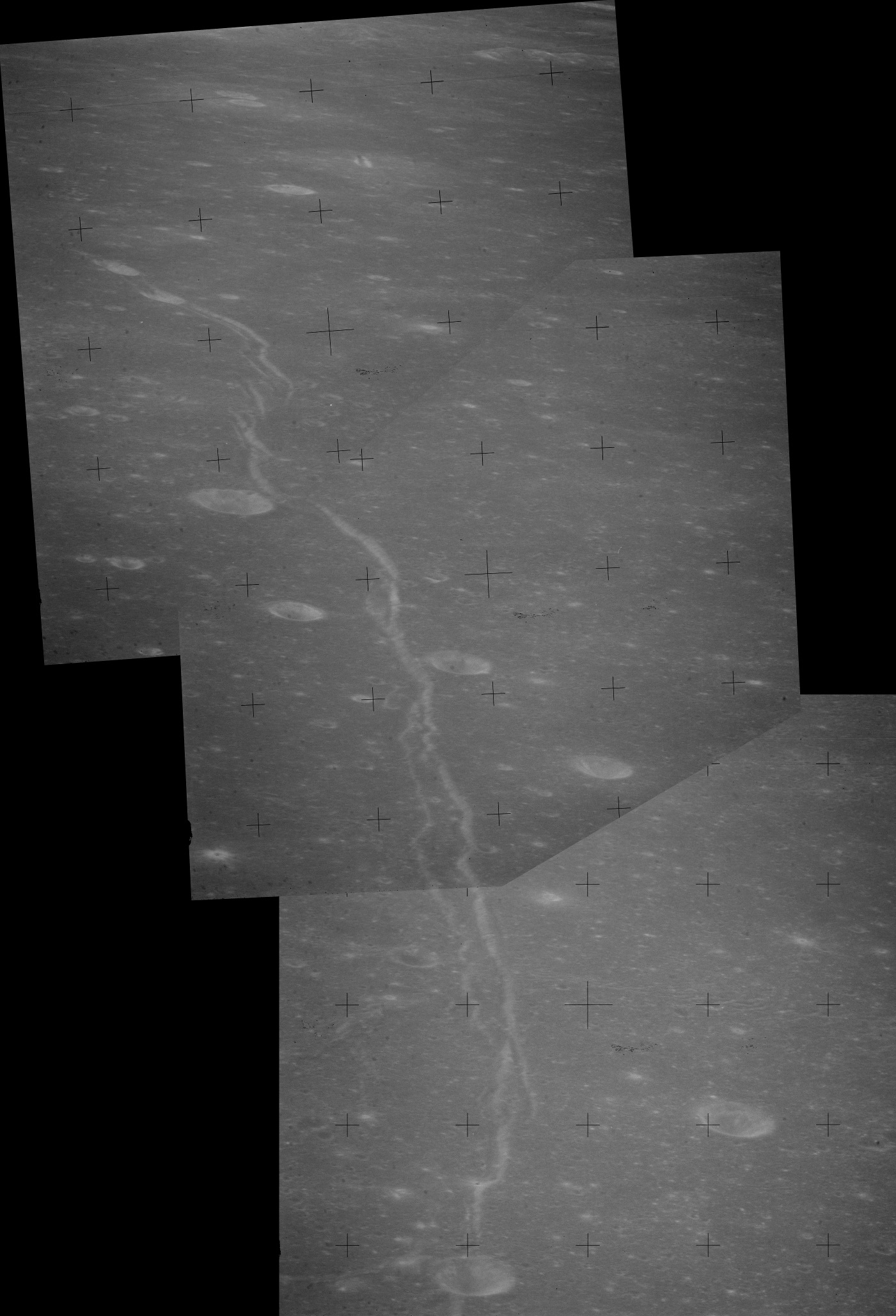
Mosaic of Apollo 15 images

Rupes Cauchy is a 120 km-long escarpment at 9.0°N 37.0°E on the surface of the Moon. It faces southwest, and rises about 200–300 m. It is located in the northeastern portion of the Mare Tranquillitatis, and is named after the nearby crater Cauchy.

The east end of Rupes Cauchy emerges from the highlands on the eastern margin of Mare Tranquillitatis. The 3.6 km diameter crater Cauchy C intersects the Rupes due south of Cauchy crater itself. Cauchy E and F lie to the north side of the Rupes, and Cauchy B lies on the south side. At the west end of the Rupes are two similar-sized elongate depressions (unlikely to be impact craters). Between Cauchy B and the depressions the Rupes form an en echelon pattern, similar to that of veins within rock on earth, on a grand scale. The similar-sized craters Sinas J and H lie to the west of the depressions.

Rupes Cauchy casts a thin shadow about five days after the new moon, when the sunrise terminator is nearby and the sunlight is arriving at a low angle.

The feature name is shown as Fossa Casals on a 1974 map based on Apollo 15 photographs, but the name was not approved by the IAU. The term Rupes was used in favor of Fossa for the names of lunar scarps (such as Rupes Recta or Rupes Altai).
