= Palus Somni =

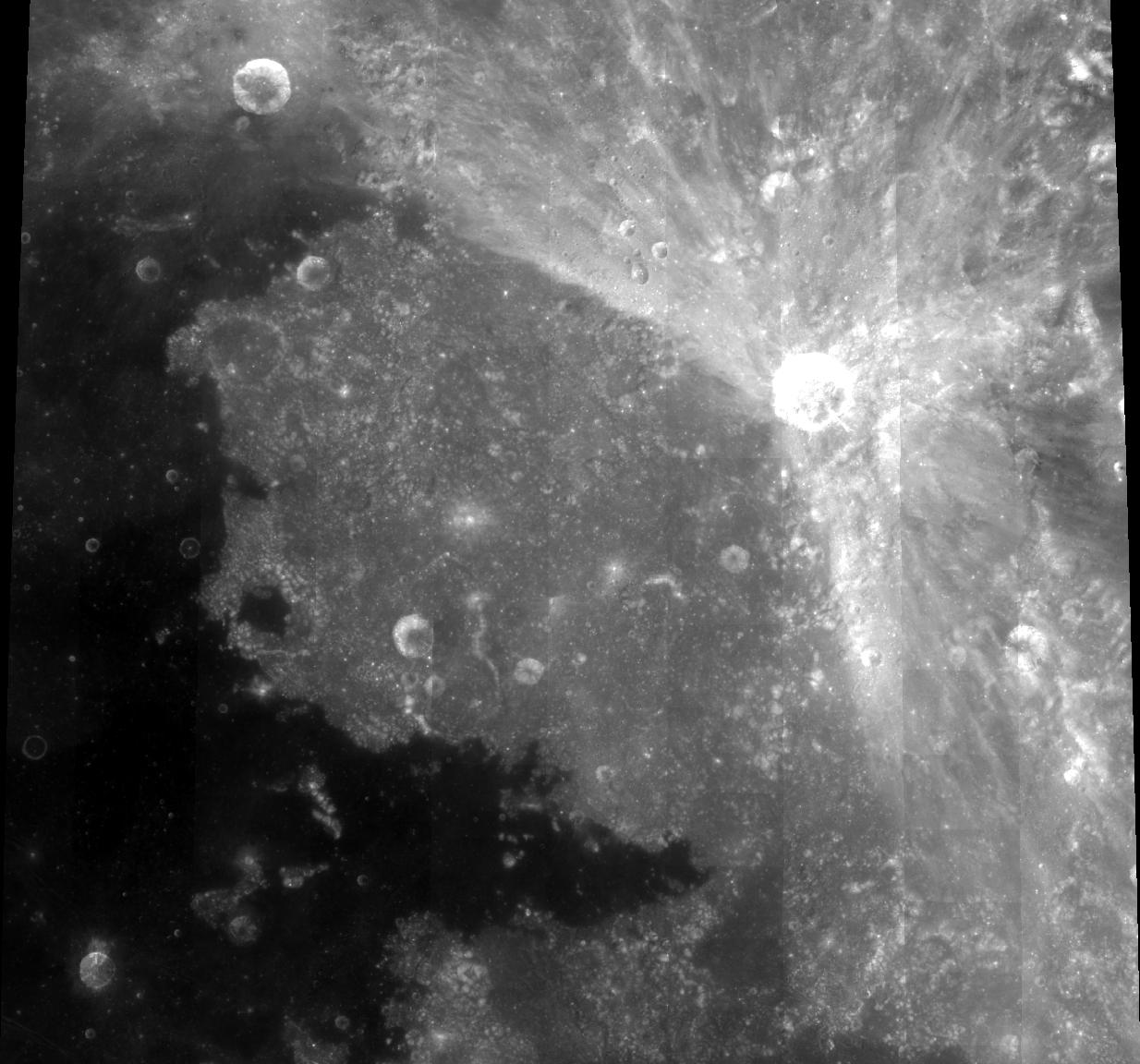
- Coordinates: 14.1°N 45.0°E
- Diameter: 163 km
- Eponym: Marsh of Sleep

Palus Somni /ˈpeɪləs ˈsɒmnaɪ/ (Latin palūs somnī "Marsh of Sleep") is an area on the Moon of relatively level but somewhat uneven terrain that lies along the northeastern edge of Mare Tranquillitatis and the Sinus Concordiae. It has selenographic coordinates 14.1° N, 45.0° E, and has a diameter of 163 km.

The surface of this feature has low ridges and patches of level terrain. It has a higher albedo than the lunar mare to the west, and is a shade of grey typical of continental terrain. A few minor craters lie within its borders, with the flooded Lyell along the west edge, Crile to the east, and Franz to the northwest. The bright crater Proclus is to the northeast.

In 1907 it was described as having "a color which is unique upon the moon, a kind of light brown, quite unlike the hue of any of the other plains or mountain regions"
