= Franz (crater) =

Crater on the Moon

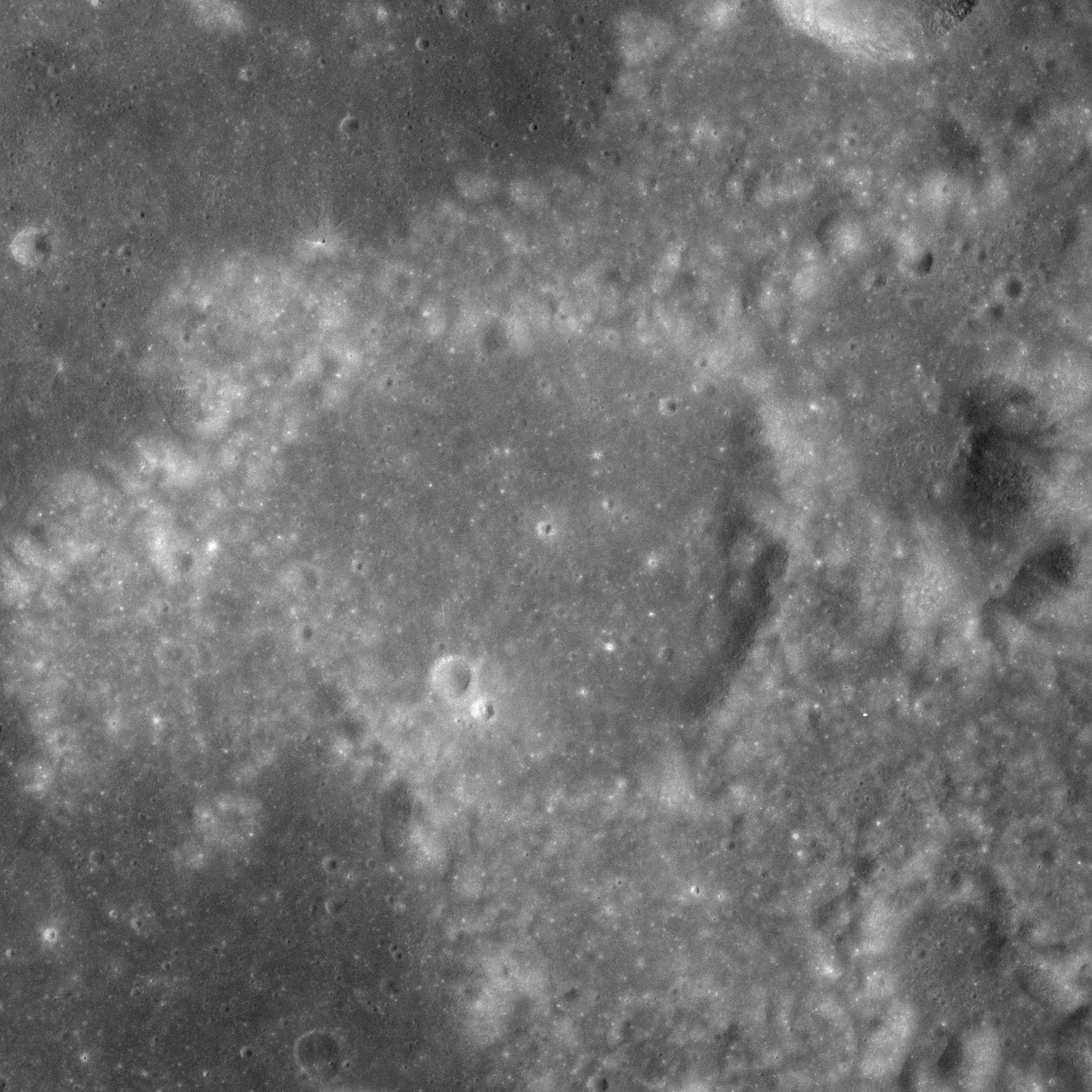
- Apollo 17 Mapping Camera image
- Coordinates: 16.57°N 40.24°E
- Diameter: 25.48 km (15.83 mi)
- Depth: 0.6 km (0.37 mi)
- Colongitude: 187° at sunrise
- Eponym: Julius Heinrich Franz

Franz is a small lunar impact crater located along the eastern edge of the Sinus Amoris, a bay that forms a northern extension to the Mare Tranquillitatis. This formation has a diameter of 25 km. It lies to the southwest of the prominent crater Macrobius. To the north is the smaller Carmichael, and to the northwest is the diminutive Theophrastus.

The rim of this crater has been eroded due to subsequent impacts, although it retains a generally circular form. The interior has been flooded, leaving only a narrow inner wall and a low surviving rim. This floor has the same albedo as the surrounding terrain, and is not as dark as the lunar mare surface to the north and west. Attached to the exterior of the eastern rim is Proclus E, a merged double-crater formation. Proclus lies to the east across the Palus Somni, or Marsh of Sleep.

This formation is named after German astronomer Julius Heinrich Franz (1847-1913). His name was incorporated in the lunar nomenclature of Italian selenographer Johann N. Krieger. Its designation was officially adopted in 1935 by the International Astronomical Union.

== Gallery ==
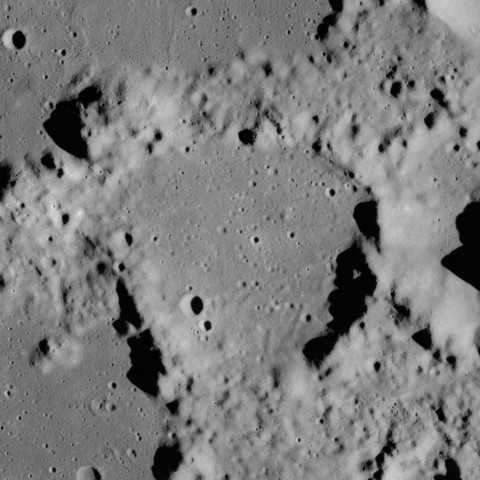
Franz under low sun angle, also from Apollo 17

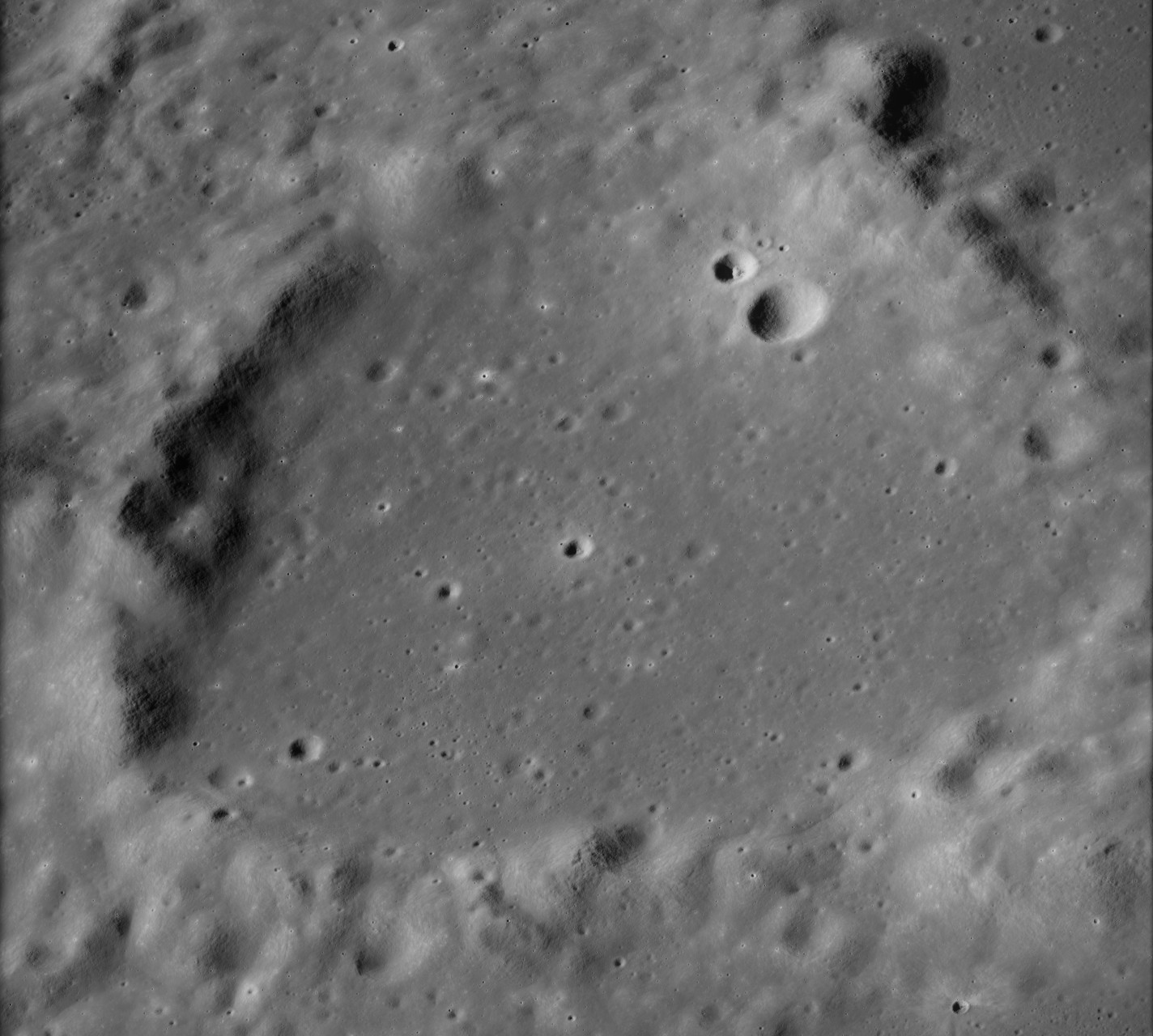
High-resolution oblique view, also from Apollo 17
