= Proclus (crater) =

Crater on the Moon

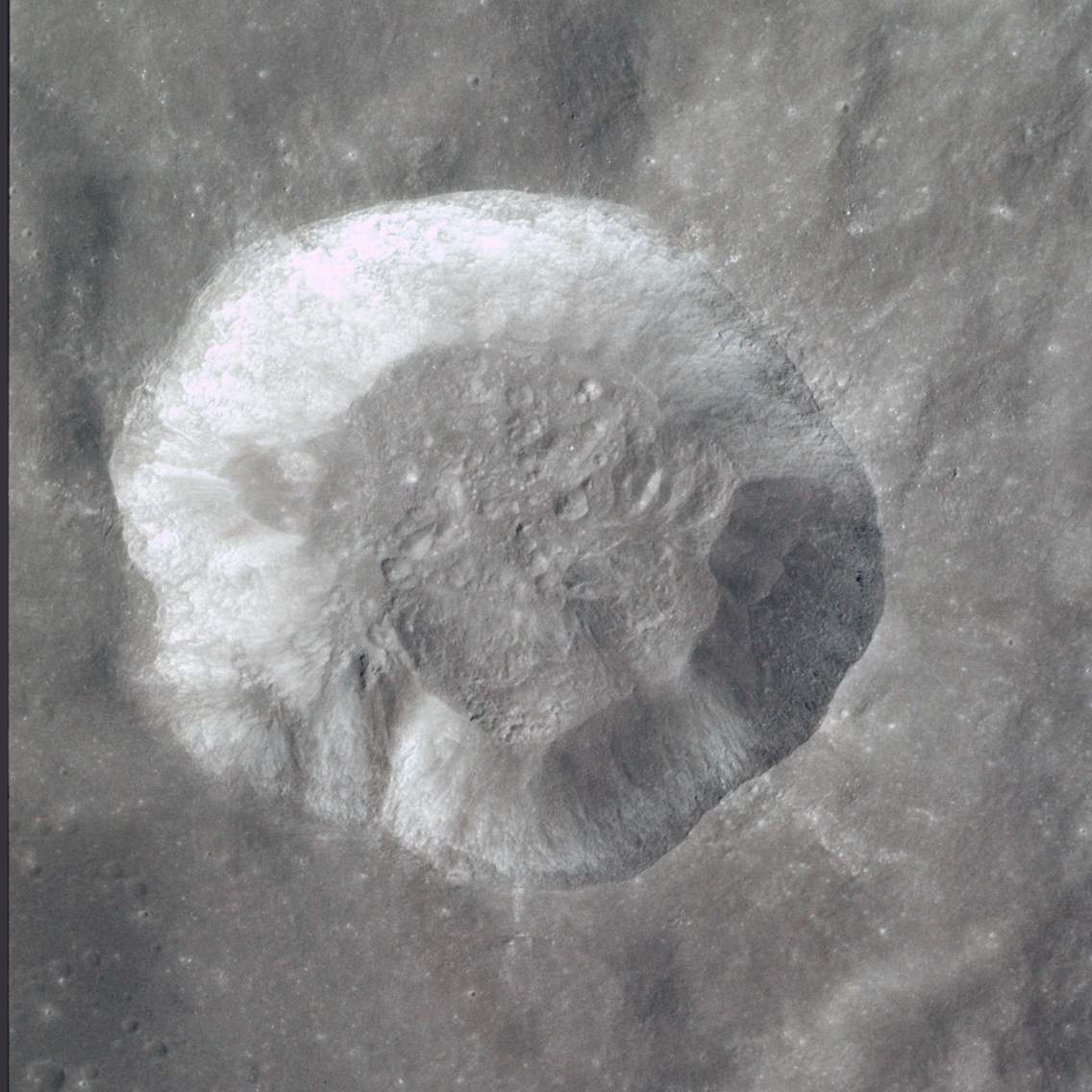
- Apollo 17 image
- Coordinates: 16.1°N 46.8°E
- Diameter: 27 km
- Depth: 1.79 km
- Colongitude: 314° at sunrise
- Formation: Copernican
- Eponym: Proclus

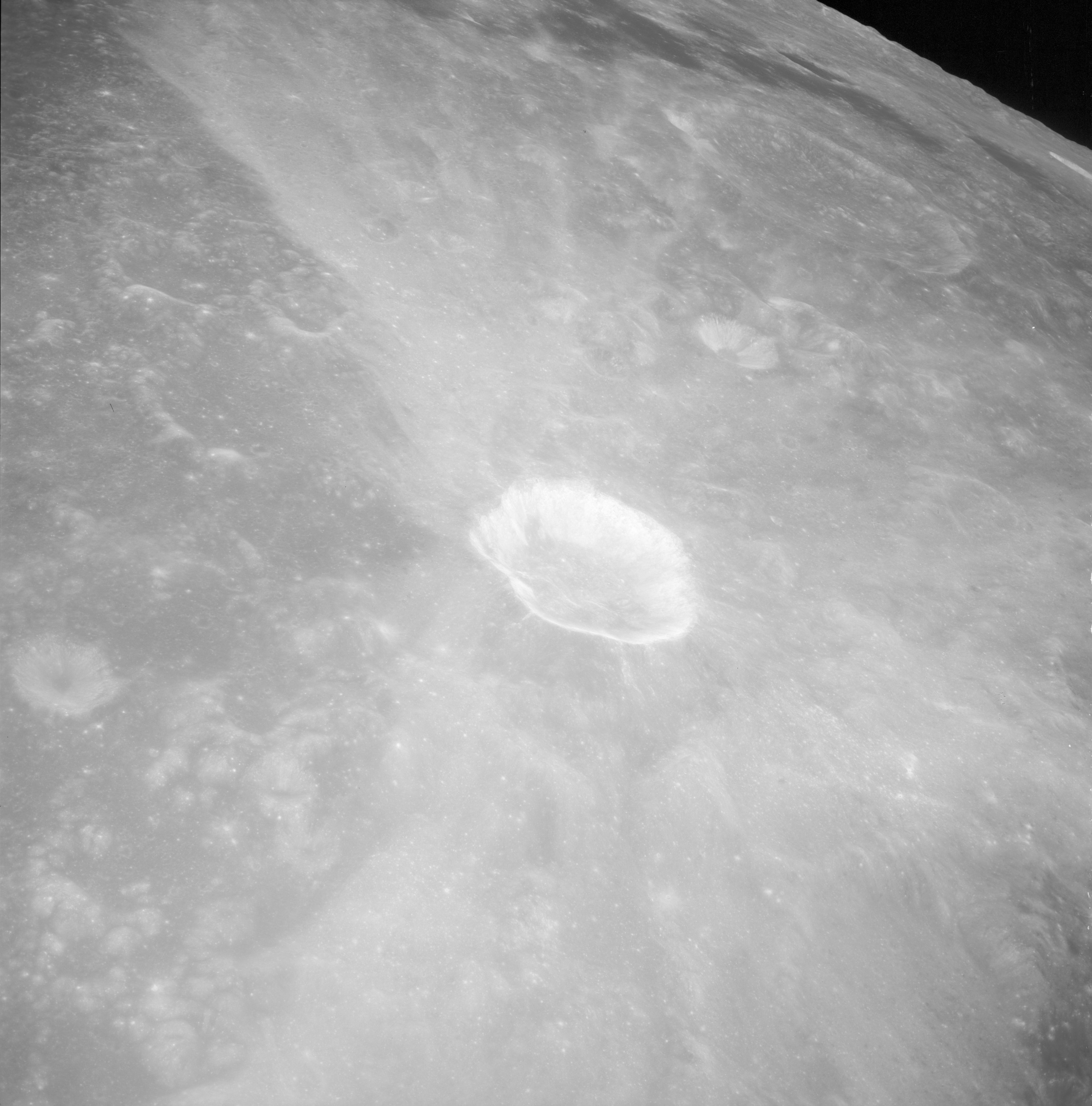
Proclus from Apollo 15: note the prominent ray system. NASA photo.

Proclus is a young lunar impact crater located to the west of the Mare Crisium on the east shore of the Palus Somni. Its diameter is 27 km and it was named after 5th century Greek mathematician, astronomer and philosopher Proclus.

It lies to the south of the prominent, terraced crater Macrobius, and west-northwest of the lava-flooded Yerkes.

== Description ==
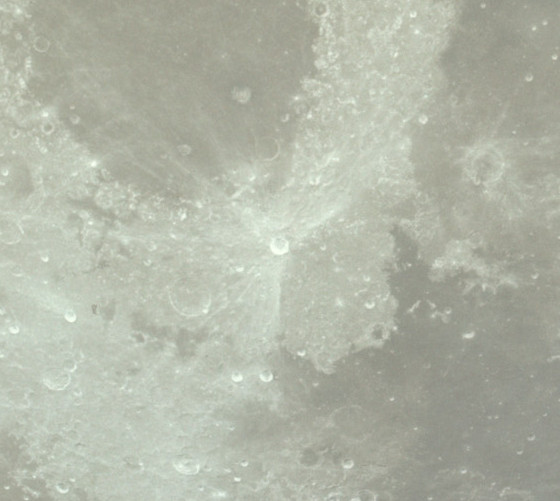
Proclus from Apollo 11, showing the rays extending into Mare Crisium

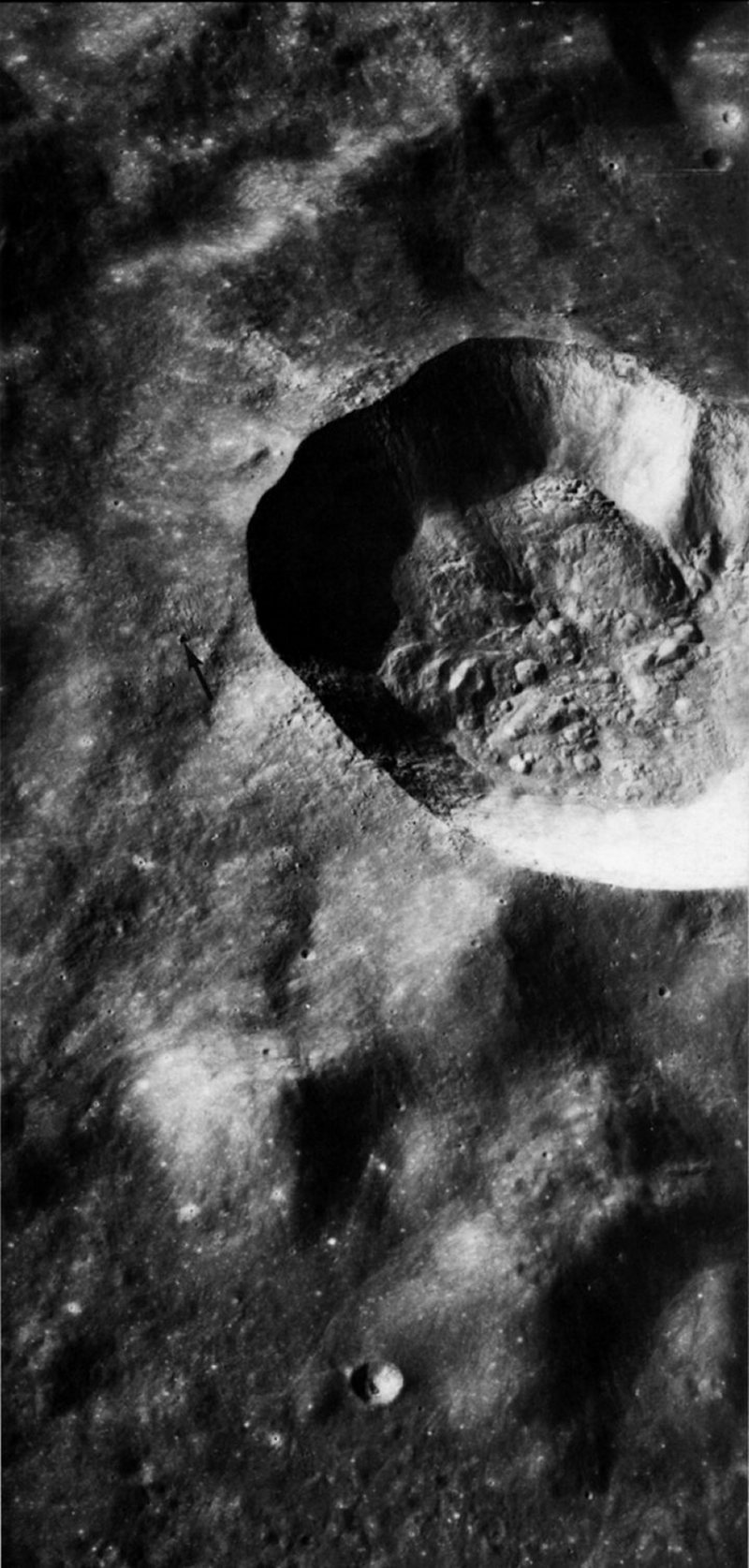
Oblique view of Proclus from Apollo 17, showing interior detail. The arrow points to a boulder that is about 200 m across.

The rim of Proclus is distinctly polygonal in shape, having the shape of a pentagon, and does not rise very far above the surrounding terrain. It has a high albedo, being second only to Aristarchus in brightness. The interior wall displays some slumping, and the floor is uneven with a few small rises from slump blocks. The infrared spectrum of pure crystalline plagioclase has been identified on the north wall.

The crater has a notable ray system that extends for a distance of over 600 kilometers. The rays display an asymmetry of form, with the most prominent being rays to the northwest, north-northeast, and northeast. There is an arc with no ejecta to the southwest. These features suggest an impact at a low angle. The rays indicate the crater is part of the Copernican System.

A candidate landing site for the Apollo program was located about 100 km north-northeast of Proclus. The site was rejected in favor of the geologically diverse Taurus-Littrow valley for the Apollo 17 mission.

== Satellite craters ==
By convention these features are identified on lunar maps by placing the letter on the side of the crater midpoint that is closest to Proclus.

Proclus	Latitude	Longitude	Diameter
A	13.4° N	42.3° E	15 km
C	12.9° N	43.6° E	10 km
D	17.5° N	41.0° E	13 km
E	16.6° N	40.9° E	12 km
G	12.7° N	42.7° E	33 km
J	17.1° N	44.0° E	6 km
K	16.5° N	46.2° E	16 km
L	17.1° N	46.4° E	9 km
M	16.4° N	45.2° E	8 km
P	15.3° N	48.7° E	30 km
R	15.8° N	45.5° E	28 km
S	15.7° N	47.9° E	18 km
T	15.4° N	46.7° E	21 km
U	15.2° N	48.0° E	13 km
V	14.8° N	48.3° E	19 km
W	17.5° N	46.2° E	7 km
X	17.7° N	45.1° E	6 km
Y	17.5° N	44.9° E	8 km
Z	17.9° N	44.7° E	6 km

The following craters have been renamed by the IAU.

- Proclus F — See Crile (crater).
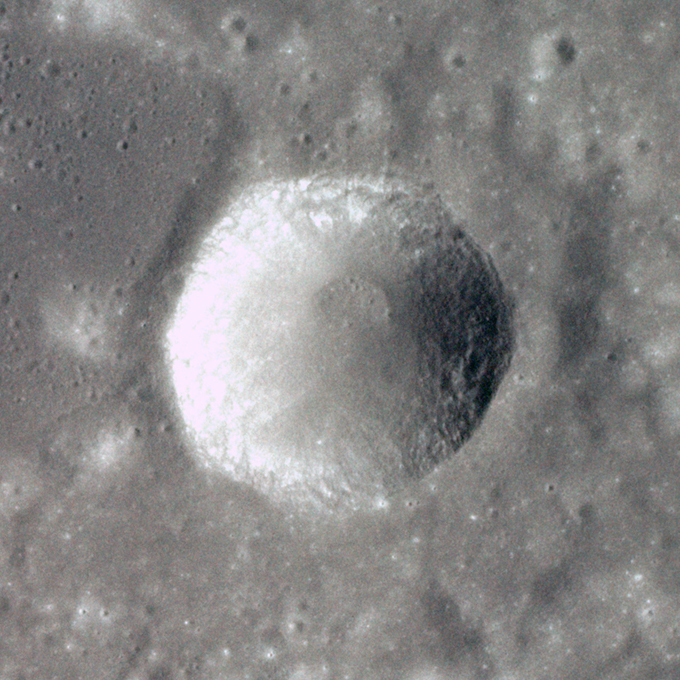
Proclus D

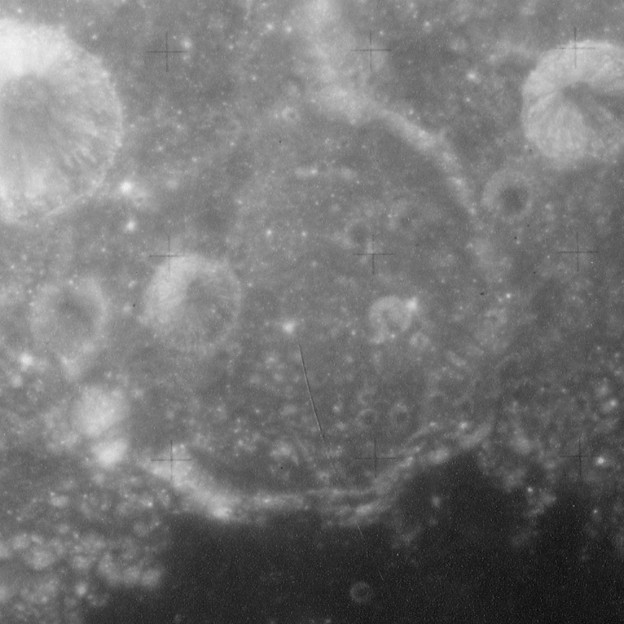
Proclus G
