= Sinus Concordiae =

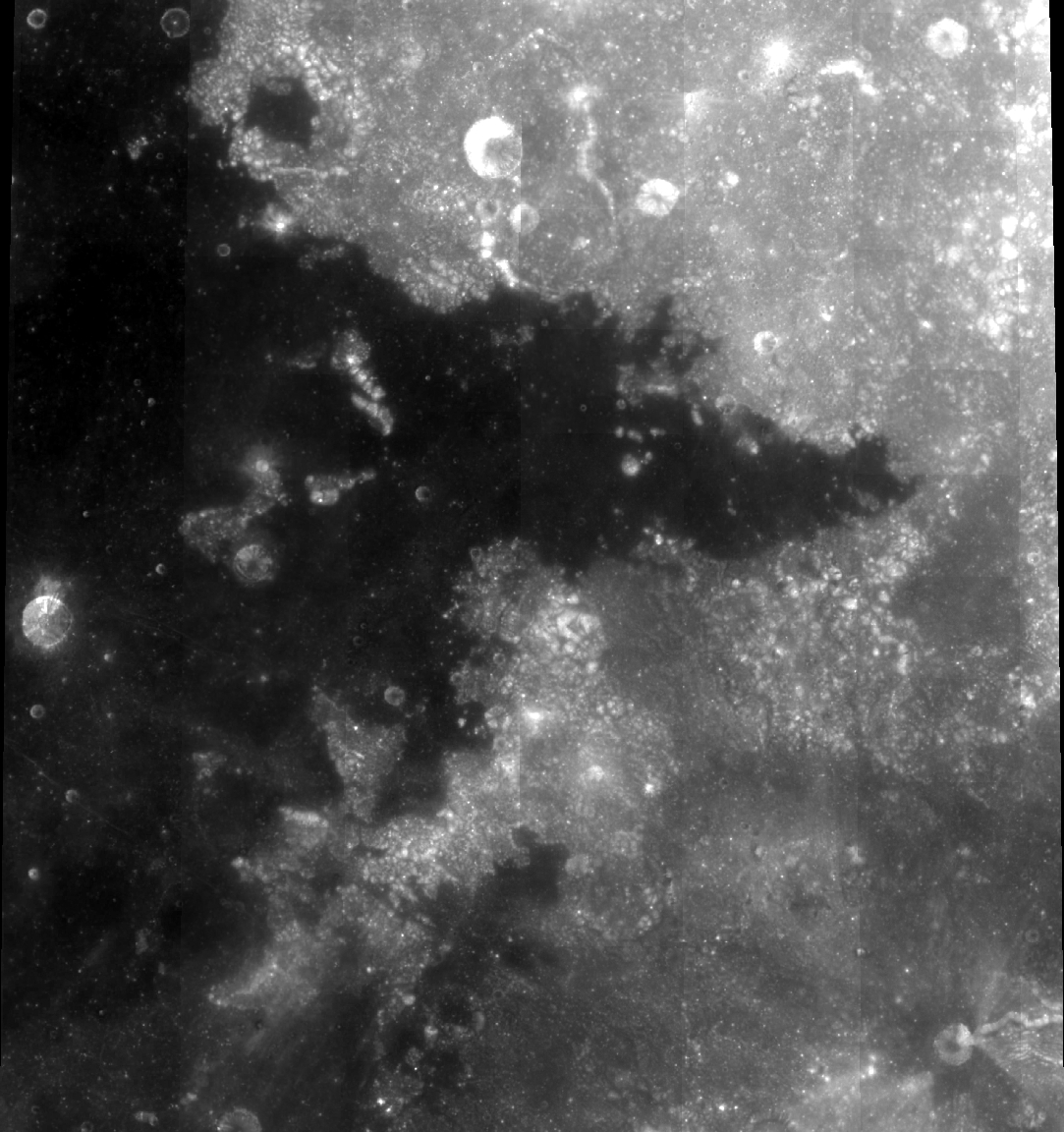
- Coordinates: 10.8°N 43.2°E
- Diameter: 142 km
- Eponym: Bay of Harmony

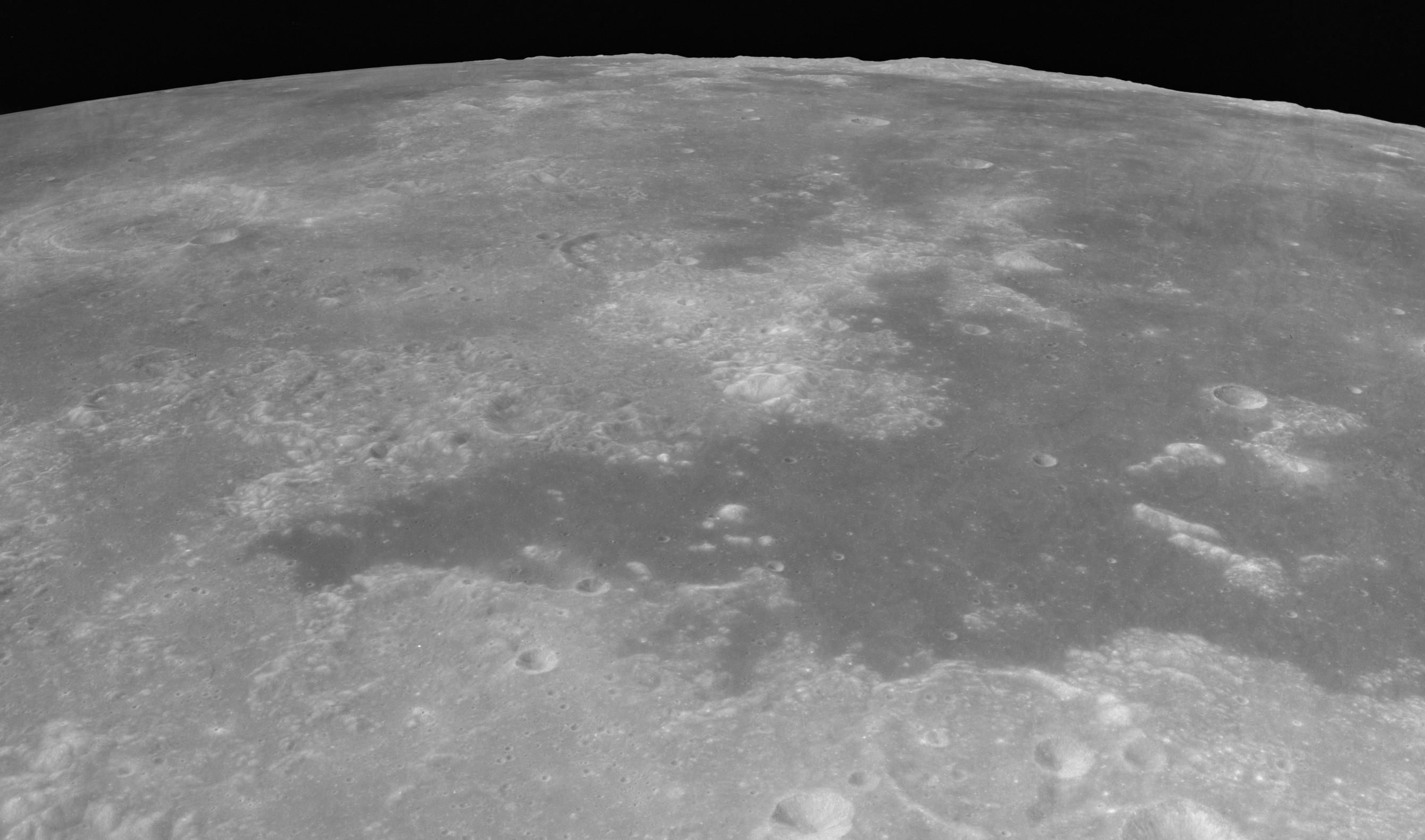
Oblique view facing south from Apollo 17

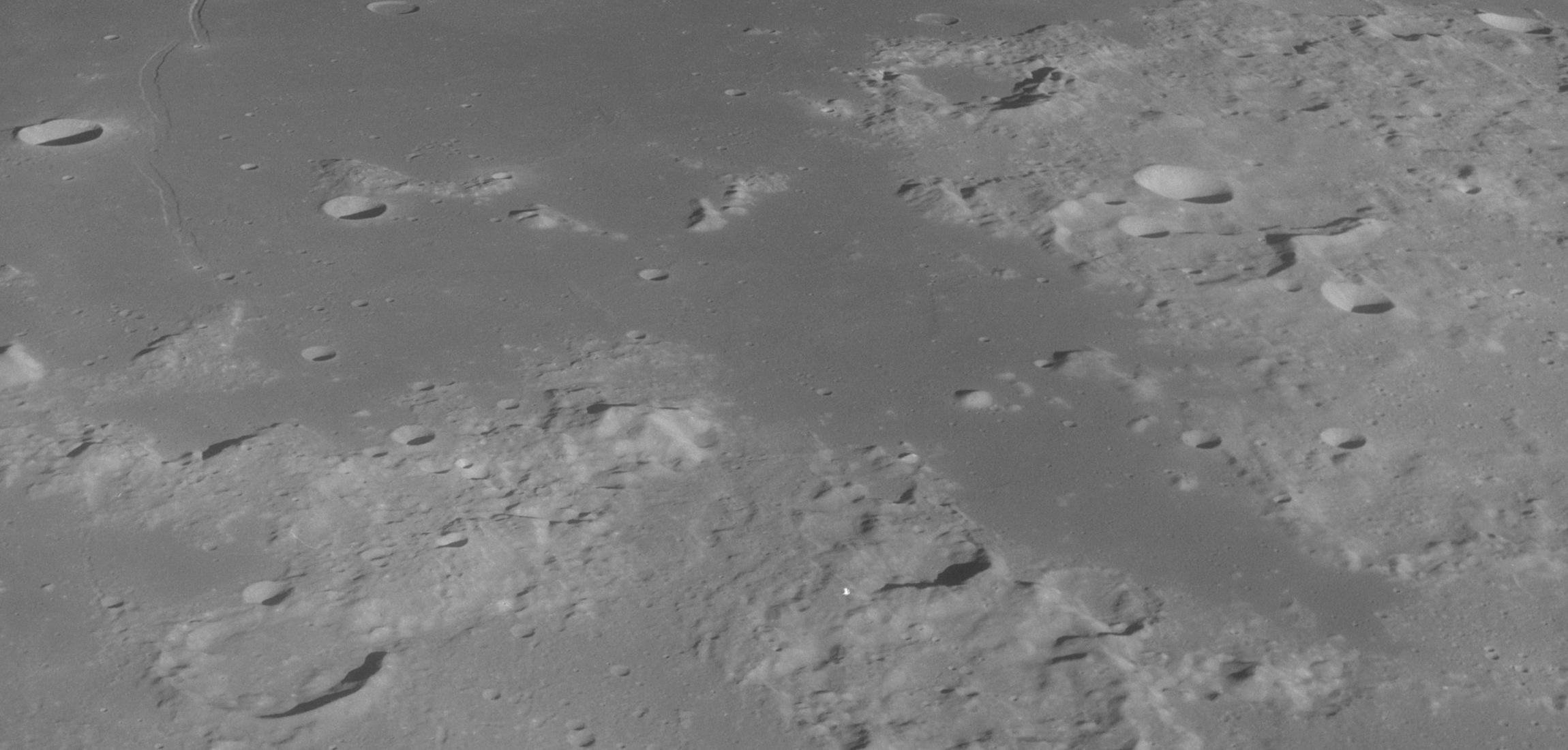
Oblique view facing west from Apollo 11

Sinus Concordiae /ˈsaɪnəs kənˈkɔːrdɪiː/ (Latin sinus concordiae "Bay of Harmony") is a bay (sinus) on the Moon that lies along the eastern edge of the Mare Tranquillitatis. Along its northern border is an area called the Palus Somni, while the southern border is an area of irregular terrain that contains the ruined crater Da Vinci. The selenographic coordinates of this bay are 10.8° N, 43.2° E, and it has an overall diameter of 142 km.
