= Mare Tranquillitatis =

Lunar mare

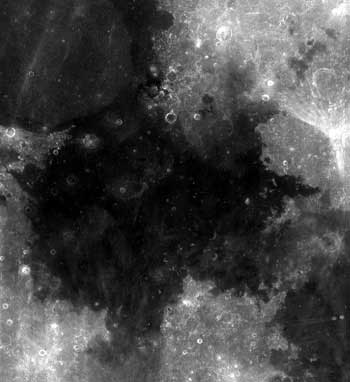
- The Sea of Tranquility of the Moon
- Coordinates: 8.5°N 31.4°E
- Diameter: 876 km (544 mi)
- Eponym: Sea of Tranquility

Mare Tranquillitatis /træŋˌkwɪlɪˈteɪtɪs/ (Latin for Sea of Tranquillity or Sea of Tranquility) (Note: See spelling differences) is a lunar mare that sits within the Tranquillitatis basin on the Moon. It contains Tranquility Base, the first location on another celestial body to be visited by humans.

The mare material within the basin consists of basalt formed in the intermediate to young age group of the Upper Imbrian epoch. The surrounding mountains are thought to be of the Lower Imbrian epoch, but the actual basin is probably Pre-Nectarian. The basin has irregular margins and lacks a defined multiple-ringed structure. The irregular topography in and near this basin results from the intersection of the Tranquillitatis, Nectaris, Crisium, Fecunditatis, and Serenitatis basins with two throughgoing rings of the Procellarum basin. Palus Somni, on the northeastern rim of the mare, is filled with the basalt that spilled over from Tranquillitatis.

This mare has a slight bluish tint relative to the rest of the Moon and stands out quite well when color is processed and extracted from multiple photographs. The color is likely due to higher metal content in the basaltic soil or rocks.

Unlike many other maria, there is no mass concentration (mascon), or gravitational high, in the center of Mare Tranquillitatis. Mascons were identified in the center of other maria (such as Serenitatis or Imbrium) from Doppler tracking of the five Lunar Orbiter spacecraft in 1968. The gravity field was mapped at higher resolution with later orbiters such as Lunar Prospector and GRAIL, which unveiled an irregular pattern.

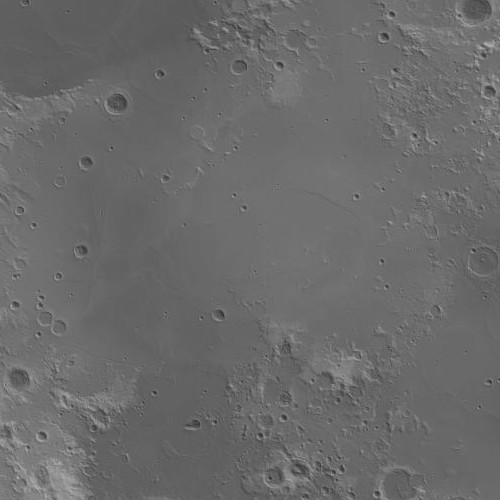
A topographic map of the Sea of Tranquility

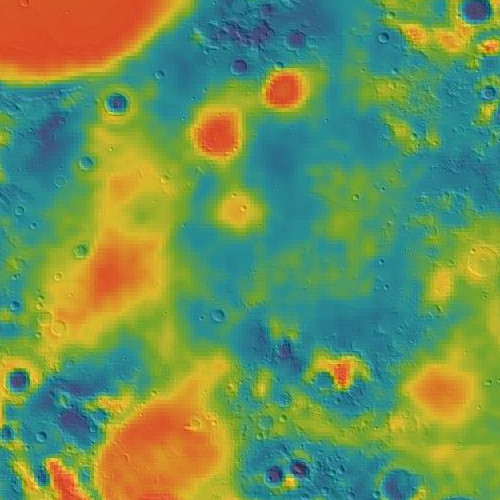
A gravity map based on GRAIL

The Lunar nearside with major maria and craters. Mare Tranquillitatis is in the upper-right quadrant

== Naming ==
Mare Tranquillitatis was named in 1651 by astronomers Francesco Grimaldi and Giovanni Battista Riccioli in their lunar map Almagestum novum.

Michael van Langren, in his Lumina Austriaca Philippica of 1645, used the name "Mare Belgicum".

== Landings ==
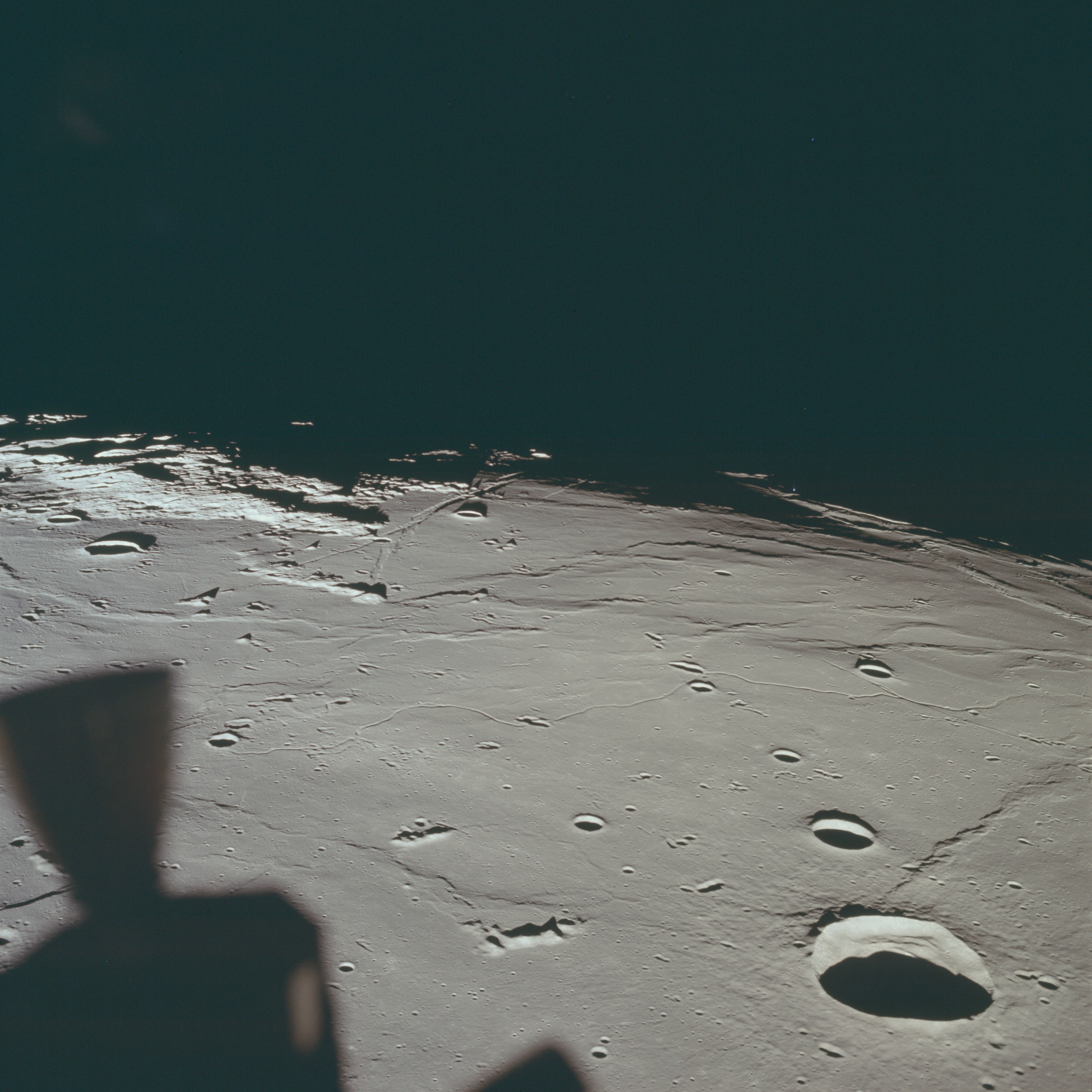
The Apollo 11 landing site at center, facing west, with the 22-kilometer-wide Maskelyne crater in right foreground

On February 20, 1965, the Ranger 8 spacecraft was deliberately crashed into the Mare Tranquillitatis at 2.6377°N 24.7881°E after successfully transmitting 7,137 close-range photographs of the Moon in the final 23 minutes of its mission.

Surveyor 5 landed in Mare Tranquillitatis on September 11, 1967, after transmitting 19,118 images of the Moon, and was the fifth lunar lander of the uncrewed Surveyor program.

=== Apollo 11 ===
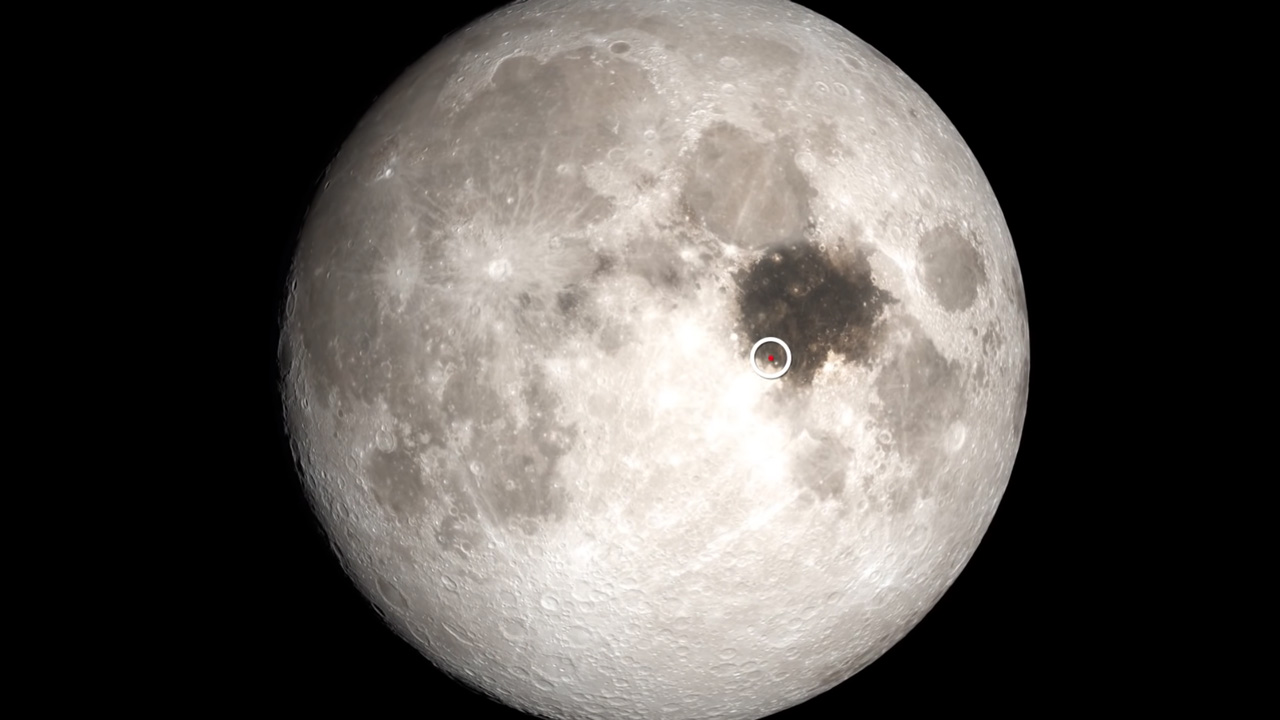
The Moon with Mare Tranquillitatis highlighted and the first crewed lunar landing marked

Mare Tranquillitatis was the landing site for the first crewed landing on the Moon on July 20, 1969, at 20:18 UTC. After astronauts Neil Armstrong and Buzz Aldrin made a soft landing in the Apollo 11 Lunar Module Eagle, Armstrong told flight controllers on Earth, "Houston, Tranquility Base here. The Eagle has landed." The landing area at 0.8°N 23.5°E has been designated Statio Tranquillitatis after Armstrong's name for it. Three small craters to the north of the base have been named Aldrin, Collins, and Armstrong in honor of the Apollo 11 crew.

Apollo 11 landed at 00.67408°N 23.47297°E.

== Bays ==
Along the periphery of the mare are several bay-shaped features that have been given names: Sinus Amoris, Sinus Asperitatis, Sinus Concordiae, and Sinus Honoris.

== Views ==
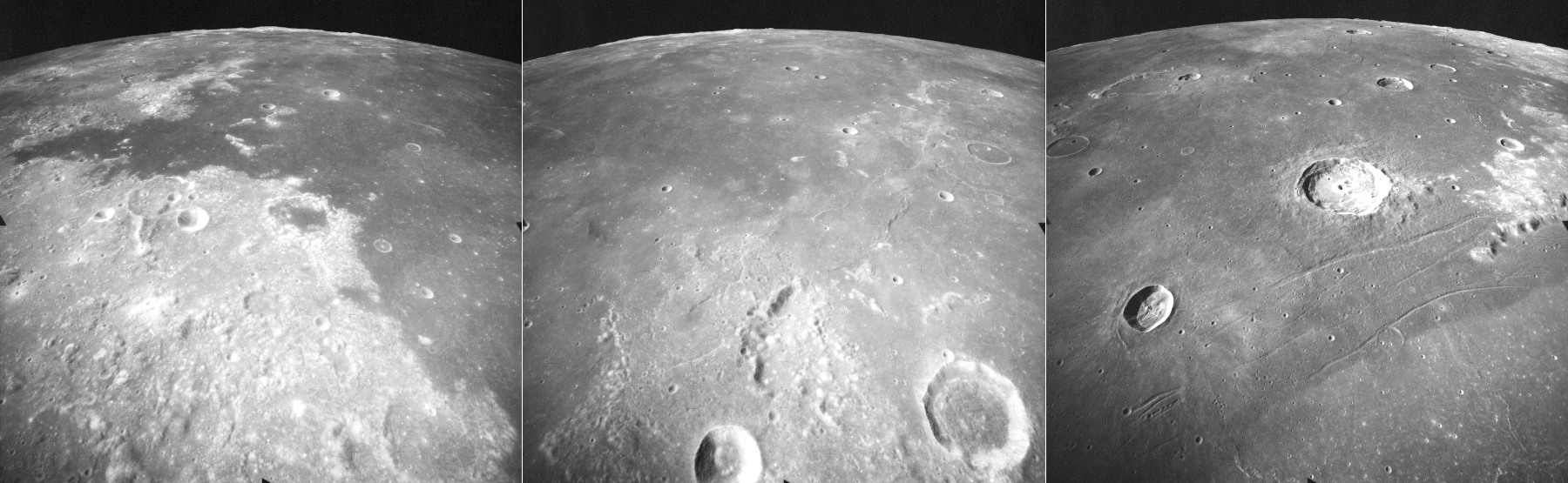
Three views of Mare Tranquillitatis, taken by the mapping camera of the 1972 Apollo 17 mission

These are three views of Mare Tranquillitatis on the Moon, taken by the mapping camera of the Apollo 17 mission in 1972, facing south-southwest from an average altitude of 111 km on Revolution 36 of the mission. At the left is the east side of Mare Tranquillitatis, with the craters Franz (bottom right), Lyell (dark floor, right of center), and Taruntius (upper left). The "bay" of dark mare (basalt) at left is Sinus Concordiae, with "islands" of older, light highland material. At the right is the crater Cauchy, which lies between the Rupes Cauchy and Cauchy rille.

The center photo shows the central mare with craters Vitruvius (lower right) and Gardner (bottom center). At the horizon are lighter highlands at the southern margin of the mare, near the Apollo 11 landing site. The crater Jansen is visible at the edges of both the center and right photos. The right photo shows the western mare, with the craters Dawes (lower left) and the large Plinius (43 km diameter), with the Plinius Rilles in the foreground. These photos were taken within minutes of each other as the command module America orbited the Moon. The Sun elevation drops from 46 degrees at left to 30 degrees at right.

== Gallery ==
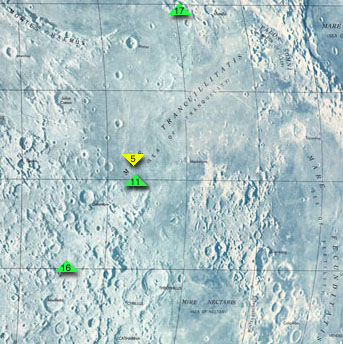
A map of the Sea of Tranquility, showing the landing sites of Apollo 11, Apollo 16, Apollo 17, and Surveyor 5. To the southeast is Mare Fecunditatis, to the northeast is Mare Crisium, to the northwest is Mare Serenitatis, and to the south is Mare Nectaris.

Neil Armstrong lands the Apollo 11 Lunar Module Eagle on the Moon at Mare Tranquillitatis, July 20, 1969, creating Tranquility Base. Starts approximately 6,200 feet from the surface.

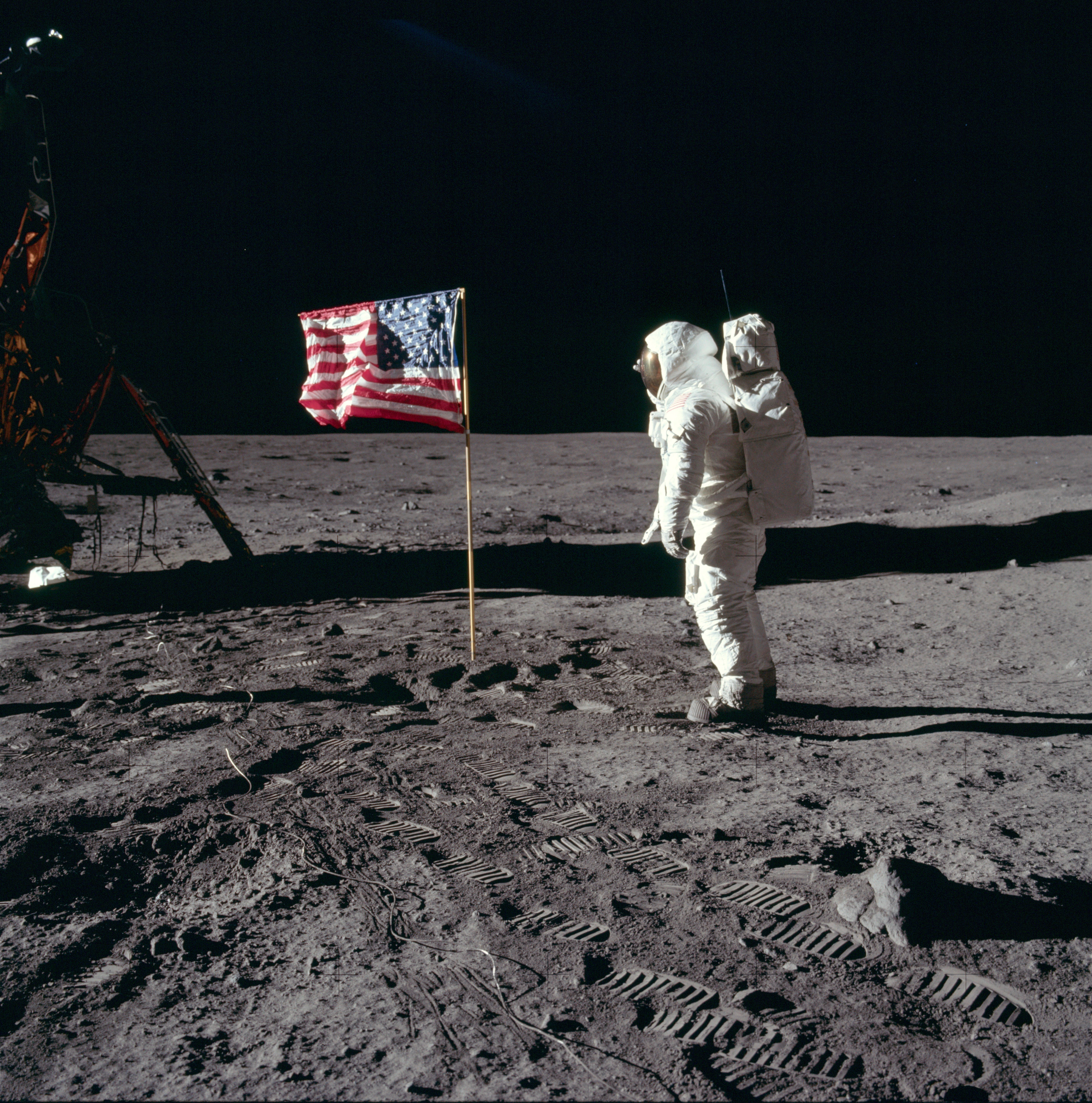
Buzz Aldrin salutes the U.S. flag on Mare Tranquillitatis during Apollo 11 in 1969.

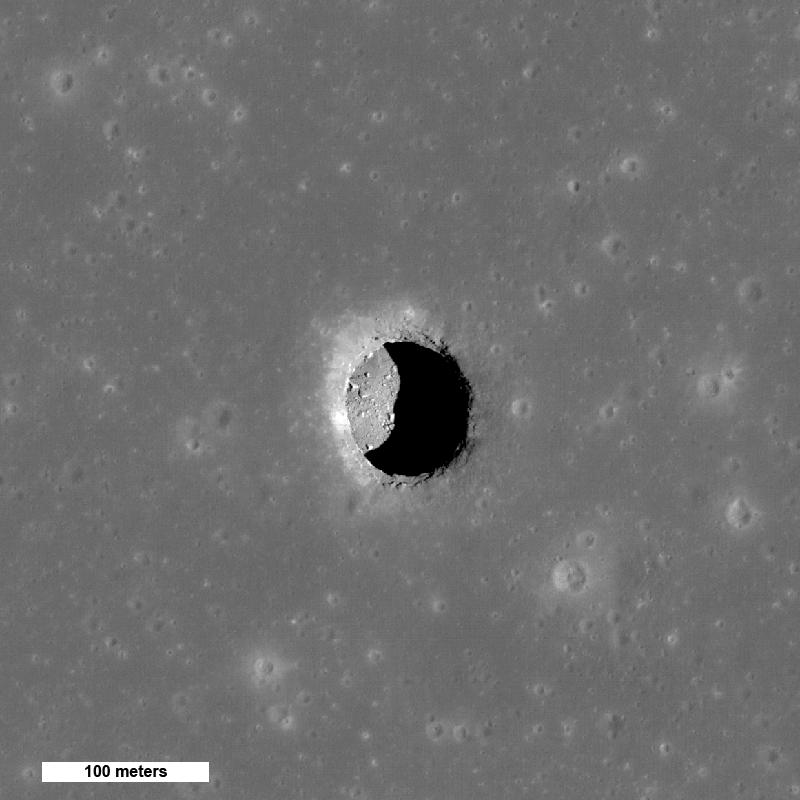
A high sun view of the Mare Tranquillitatis pit crater revealing boulders on an otherwise smooth floor. The image is 400 meters wide, north is up.

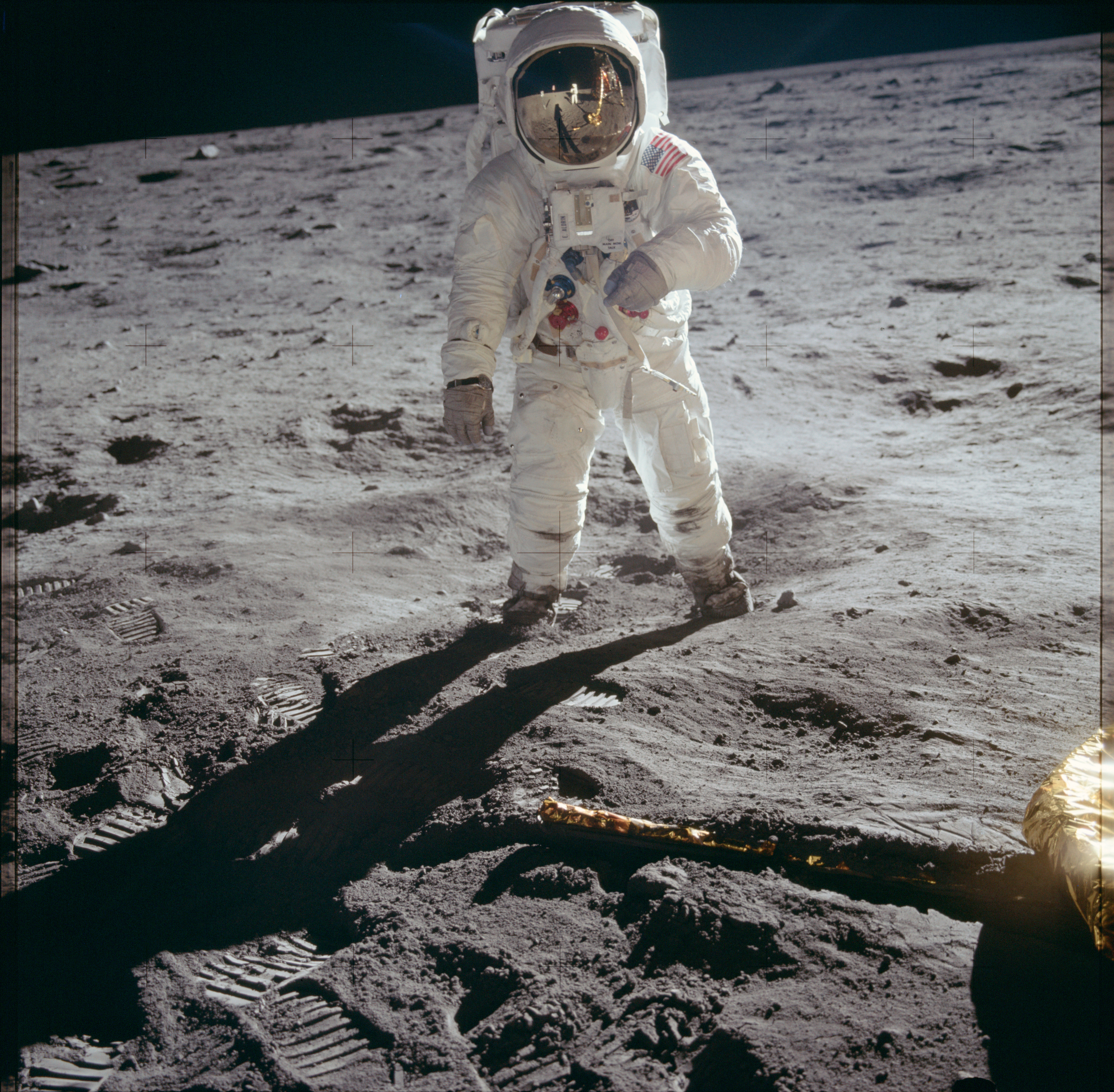
Buzz Aldrin poses for the camera during Apollo 11; often nicknamed A Man on the Moon, it is one of the most iconic photos.

== In popular culture ==
- Sea of Tranquility, a 2022 book by Emily St. John Mandel

== See also ==
- Lists of astronomical objects
- Volcanism on the Moon
