= Tisserand =

Tisserand is a French occupational surname meaning "weaver". Notable people with the surname include:

- Félix Tisserand (1845–1896), French astronomer
- Marcel Tisserand (b. 1993), Congolese footballer

== See also ==
- 3663 Tisserand (minor planet)
- Tisserand (crater)
- Tisserand's criterion
- Tisserand's parameter
- Tisserand Hydroplum
- Tisseur
- Le Tellier
