= Journey of Apollo 15 to the Moon =

Launched at 9:34:00 am EST on July 26, 1971, Apollo 15 took four days to reach the Moon. After spending two hours in orbit around the Earth, the S-IVB third stage of the Saturn V was reignited to send them to the Moon.

During the retrieval of the Apollo Lunar Module (LM) from its stowed position below the command and service module (CSM), a light came on on the control panel that indicated the valves of the service propulsion system were open and the engine should be firing. A short was found in a switch that controlled the redundant valves for the engine. New procedures were developed to deal with this. During their first inspection of the LM, Scott and Irwin found that the glass cover of a tapemeter had broken forcing them to clean up the glass shards lest they breathe them in.

On the fourth day they entered into lunar orbit and prepared for lunar descent.

== Launch and trans-lunar injection ==
Apollo 15 launch
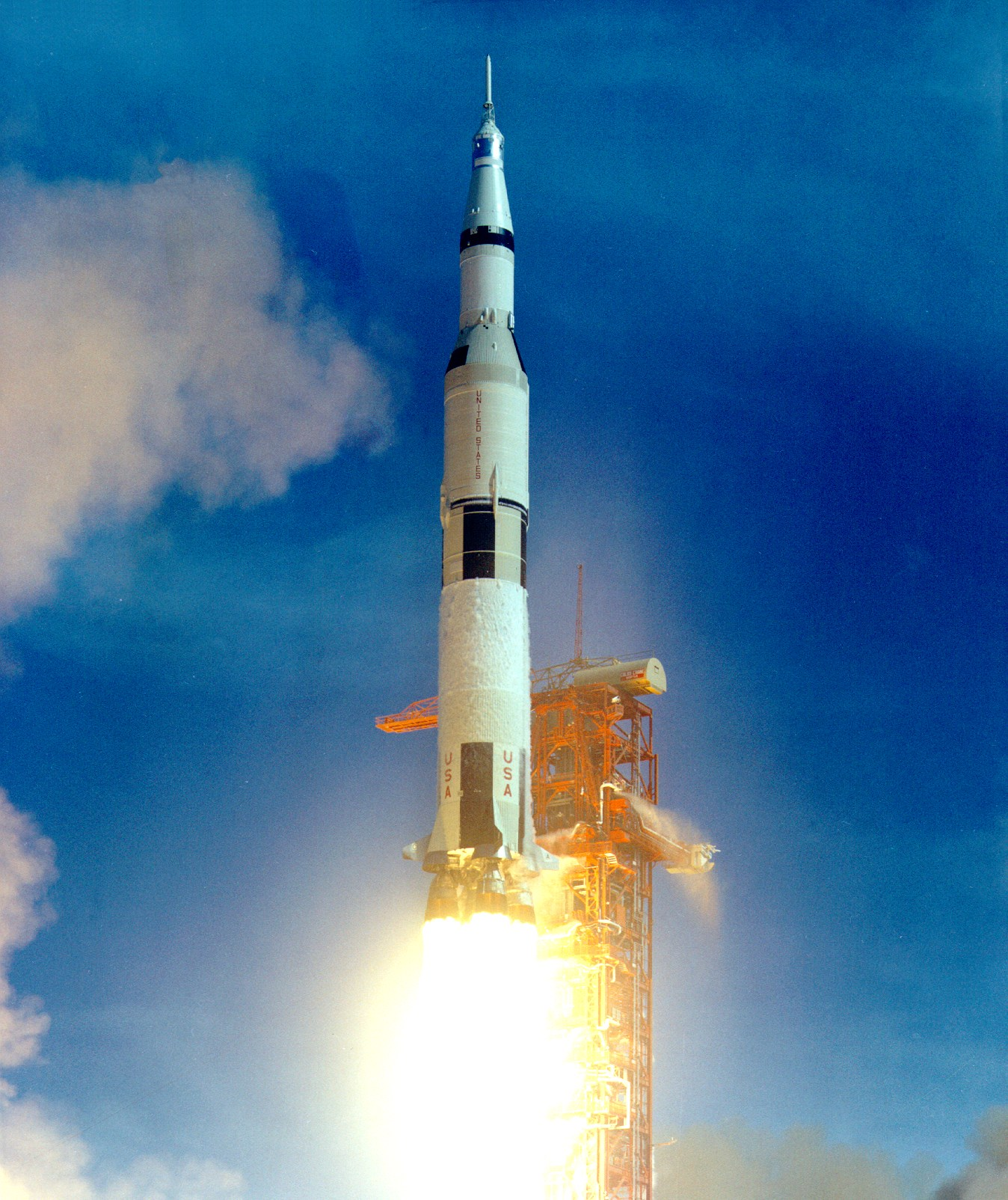

Saturn V launch
- Launch: July 26, 1971, 13:34:00.6 UTC
- Operator: NASA
- Pad: Kennedy LC-39A
- Payload: Apollo CSM-112; Apollo LM-10
- Outcome: Success

Components
- Serial no.: AS-510

The crew were awakened at 4:19 am EST. After brief medical exams, they ate breakfast with the backup and support crews. They then put on their space suits and were taken by van to the launch site, where they arrived at 6:45 am. This was about two-and-a-half hours before launch. During the launch phase of the flight, Scott sat in the left-hand seat of the CSM, Worden in the center seat, and Irwin in the right-hand seat.

Apollo 15 was launched at 9:34:00 am EST on July 26, 1971. One of the few problems encountered during the launch phase came at the separation of the first and second stages. Solid-fuel ullage rockets had been removed from the interstage between the first and second stages. These rockets were used to settle the fuel and oxidizer in the S-II. The first stage also carried only four retrorockets whereas previous missions had used eight. The first stage engines did not cutoff cleanly, taking over four seconds to drop from 2% thrust to zero. This meant that the S-IC was closer to the S-II than planned and the ignition of the second stage disabled the telemetry package on the first stage.

Eleven minutes and 34 seconds after launch the crew were in their Earth parking orbit 92.5 by 91.5 nm (171.3 by 169.5 km). An orbit of this height is not sustainable for very long due to friction with the Earth's atmosphere, but the crew would only spend three hours before reigniting the S-IVB third stage to put them on a lunar-bound trajectory. About 485 lb (220 kg) of liquid oxygen (LOX) was lost through an open vent of the S-IVB after the rocket was pitched down too quickly after cutoff.

One of the windows of the Apollo 15 CSM was specifically designed to transmit ultraviolet radiation, permitting the crew to acquire UV photographs of the Earth and the Moon. These photographs began as soon as they reached Earth orbit and would continue throughout the mission. During times when they were not using the window, Mission Control had them place a cover over the window that blocked the UV, in an effort to minimize their exposure.

Two hours, 50 minutes and 2.6 seconds after launch the S-IVB reignited and burned for 5 minutes and 49 seconds. The burn increased the spacecraft's speed from 25,620 feet per second (7,809 m/s) to 35,522 feet per second (10,827 m/s). The altitude had been raised to 167.4 nautical miles (310.0 km).

== Engine problems ==
The next major task for the crew was transposition, docking, and extraction. The lunar module sat below the command and service module, head-to-tail. As such, it was required for the CSM to separate from the S-IVB, travel a short distance, turn 180 degrees and then dock with and extract the lunar module. First the CSM, Endeavour, separated, taking ten minutes to turn, come back and hard dock. About half an hour later, after pressurizing the lunar module and checking the integrity of the docking latches, the crew extracted Falcon from the S-IVB. The S-IVB would be put on a trajectory so that it would impact the lunar surface at 3°39'S, 7°35'W.

It was sometime during the transposition and docking that the "SPS Thrust" light on the entry monitor system part of the control panel came on. The service propulsion system (SPS) was the rocket engine of the CSM and this particular light was used to indicate the valves in the engine were open and that the rocket should be firing, something that was not in fact happening. As a precaution the crew opened the circuit breakers that controlled the valves to stop them being opened by a short circuit and causing the engine to fire.

After some period of troubleshooting it was determined that there was a short circuit in the "Delta-V Thrust" switch. This switch opened the valves in the SPS. With the cause being in the switch it meant that the engine itself was fine, but new procedures would have to be used when operating the engine to stop accidental ignition.

One of the reasons for the success of the Apollo program was the redundancy of critical systems—in the case of the SPS, there were two independent valve systems for the engine. The short in the switch only affected one of these sets of valves and as such it was still possible to fire the engine. But instead of having both sets of valves open at the start of each ignition, only the trouble-free valves would be used. For long burns, the valves affected by the short would be opened only after ten seconds, and closed before the end of the burn.

Mission Control decided to cancel the first midcourse correction (MCC-1). This would give them a chance to fire the SPS engine at the second planned correction. This cancellation meant that tasks that would have been done later could be brought forward and the crew could get to sleep sooner. These tasks included a water dump and putting the spacecraft into passive thermal control (PTC) or what was often called "barbecue mode", as the spacecraft was put into a slow roll so that there was even heat distribution. Nearly 15 hours after launch, the crew switched off the lights in the cabin and went to sleep.

== Day 2 ==
The second day of Apollo 15 centered around the second planned midcourse correction and a preliminary check of the lunar module, Falcon. Mission Control first got the crew to perform a 0.7 second burn of the SPS engine before the planned second course correction. This was designed to isolate the location of the short in the Delta-V Thrust switch. The burn allowed Mission Control to confirm that the SPS would only be ignited accidentally if the faulty switch was armed. It was found after the flight that a 0.06 inch (1.4 mm) length of wire had found its way into the switch, and had shorted it. The engine burn itself was good enough, adding 5.3 ft/s (1.62 m/s) to their speed, that Mission Control cancelled the planned second and third course corrections.

After venting the atmosphere of the lunar module overboard (in case there was some contamination in the spacecraft), and then replenishing it from the CSM, the crew removed the hatch between Endeavour and Falcon and entered the LM. Scott and Irwin checked the switch settings in the LM to make sure none had changed since launch and also checked the electrical, environmental and communications systems. They found that a glass cover on one of the tapemeters had broken and that there was glass in the cabin. This did not impair the meter's use, but was of concern, as glass could be inhaled by the crew or get into the environmental systems. After replacing the hatch, the crew ate and went to bed to end their first full day in space.

== Day 3 ==
The "morning" of the third day centered around an "eye flash" experiment. Some previous crews had experienced bright flashes even when they closed their eyes. Irwin reported that he had seen them during the two previous sleep periods. The experiment involves the crew facing in the same direction, wearing blindfolds and having placed shades over the windows. They described the position, color and time of the flashes. They spent an hour doing this. It is thought that the flashes were caused by Cherenkov radiation from high energy cosmic rays passing through the eyes.

The crew entered Falcon for a second time. Mission Control had them vacuum the spacecraft and then leave the vacuum cleaner running while they did the rest of their "housekeeping". This was in an effort to remove any glass particles left in the cabin. During this period, the spacecraft passed the point when the lunar gravity becomes stronger than that of the Earth's as felt by Apollo 15.

After a quiet day, the crew had some problems after they discovered a water leak. Due to zero-gravity the water was just a large ball, and although the spacecraft was water-resistant, if it had grown too large and broken apart, water everywhere would have been unpleasant for the crew. The leak came from a loose fitting on the chlorine injector outlet. During the flight the crew would add chlorine to the water to stop any bacterial or fungal growths. The place where this was injected into the tank had come loose.

== Day 4 and LOI ==
The fourth day saw the fourth planned midcourse correction, although it was only the second actually performed on the mission. The burn lasted 0.91 seconds, adding 5.4 ft/s (1.65 m/s) to their speed. The crew then put on their A7L space suits for the jettisoning of the SIM bay door. This door was jettisoned using explosive cord and there was a small risk that it could cause the spacecraft to depressurize. It was possible, in an emergency for the crew to spend the cruise back to Earth in their pressurized space suits.

The major event of day 4 was lunar orbit insertion (LOI). Occurring behind the Moon, out of contact with the Earth, this engine burn put the spacecraft into orbit around the Moon. It was the first test of the new procedures for using both SPS during a long burn.

Loss of signal (LOS) was at 78 hours, 23 minutes and 31 seconds GET as the spacecraft went behind the Moon as seen from the Earth. This was about 8 minutes before LOI. As with all the LOI performed during Project Apollo it was perfect, the SPS burned for 6 minutes and 38 seconds, placing them into a 169 by 59 nautical miles (313 by 109.3 km) orbit.

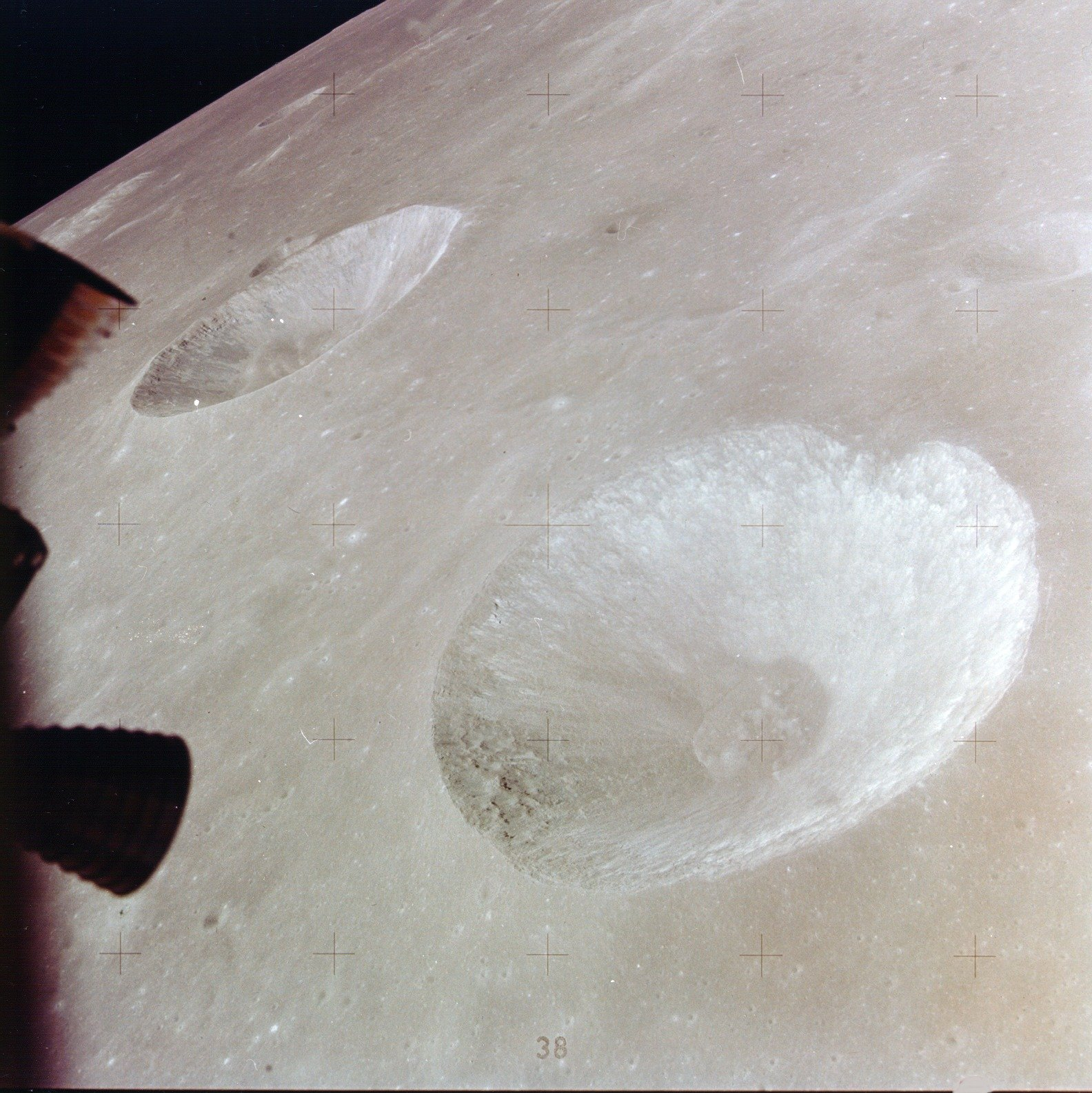
Craters Carmichael and Hill. The black shape on the left is a thruster on the LM. The photo was taken during the 13th orbit of the Moon, by Dave Scott.

Much of the first hour or so in lunar orbit was spent describing the landforms over which they were orbiting. The crew had become highly trained field geologists, especially Worden who spent time observing the Earth from an airplane, trained by Farouk El-Baz. They also photographed many features, with this crew being the first to enter into a highly inclined orbit. Previous Apollo crews had been in lunar orbits that were just over equatorial regions.

The descent orbit insertion (DOI) burn was performed behind the Moon on the second orbit. This burn placed them into a 58.8 by 9.5 nautical mile (108.9 by 17.6 km) orbit, with the low point over Hadley Rille landing site. On Apollo 11 and Apollo 12 this burn was done by the lunar module after it had undocked from the CSM. From Apollo 14 onwards, it was done by the CSM as a way of conserving fuel on the LM, allowing it to land with more equipment and consumables on board.

A major issue for all lunar orbiting spacecraft are mass concentrations or mascons. These are regional areas where denser material is under the surface. Apollo 15 travelled over regions that had never been covered on previous flights, so it was unknown how its orbit would be affected by them. Mission Control predicted that by the time the crew awoke the next "morning", the lowest point of their orbit, perilune, would have dropped to about 8.6 nm (16.1 km) but this turned out to be an underestimate.

== Lunar orbit up to PDI ==
During the crew's sleep period, the mass spectrometer was collecting the prime part of its data. The spacecraft was kept in a perfect attitude for the instrument which was designed to investigate the extremely tenuous lunar atmosphere. The "Apollo 15 Preliminary Science Report" said that most of the measurements of gas made by the spectrometer were actually caused by the spacecraft itself.

The crew was woken 18 minutes early when it was found that their orbit had decayed to 58.8 by 7.6 nm (108.8 by 14.1 km). The low point was lower than planned for and the crew had to perform a small trim burn to raise this. This was done on the opposite side of the Moon to their landing site at the end of their ninth orbit of the Moon. It was a 20-second burn of the reaction control system (RCS) and added 3.1 ft/s (0.94 m/s) to their speed. It raised the lowest point of their orbit to about 9.6 nm (17.8 km).

During the eleventh orbit, Scott and Irwin began to transfer to Falcon. The crew spent the period behind the Moon activating the LM and general housekeeping in preparation for the undocking. They also updated the guidance computer on the LM and made landmark sightings to improve the accuracy of the known position of the landing site.

Undocking was meant to come at the end of their eleventh orbit of the Moon, but was delayed by an improperly attached umbilical that sent the signal to the docking probe to disengage. After Worden fixed the connection, undocking and separation occurred properly about half an orbit late. The only effect of the late separation was the need to delay some landmark sighting by one orbit.

At the end of the twelfth orbit, Worden performed a circularization burn with SPS, raising the perilune of his orbit. The reason for this was that in the case of an abort during landing by Falcon, a circular orbit is much easier for rendezvous than to an elliptic orbit. Without the LM, the SPS only had to burn for 4 seconds, raising its orbit to 65.2 by 54.8 nm (120.7 by 101.4 km). During the 13th orbit, Worden placed Endeavour into the science collecting attitude.

On Falcon, Scott and Irwin continued to check the spacecraft, and prepared for powered descent, when they would burn the descent engine of the LM to begin their landing.

== Media ==
Launch of Apollo 15 running from T-30s through to T+40s

Endeavour docks with Falcon

Endeavour filmed from Falcon after undocking
