= Esclangon (crater) =

Crater on the Moon

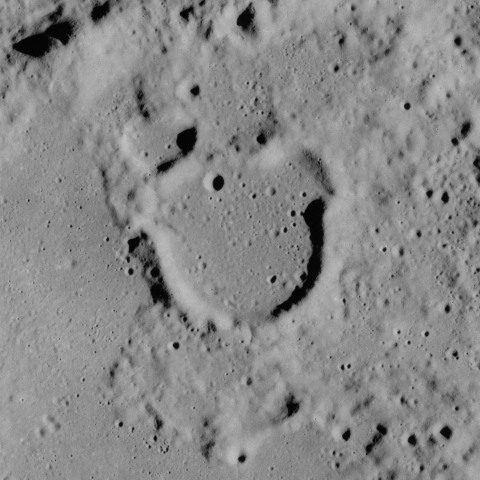
- Apollo 17 Mapping Camera image
- Coordinates: 21.5°N 42.1°E
- Diameter: 15.29 km (9.50 mi)
- Depth: 0.4 km (0.25 mi)
- Colongitude: 318° at sunrise
- Eponym: Ernest Esclangon

Esclangon is a degraded lunar impact crater that is located at the edge of the highlands to the northwest of the prominent crater Macrobius, and east of Sinus Amoris. Its diameter is 15 km. Just to the west-southwest is the crater Hill. Lacus Bonitatis, the Lake of Good, is located to the east and northeast of Esclangon.

The interior of this crater has been flooded, leaving only a low rim above the surface being only about 400 meters deep. The rim is not quite circular, having bulges to the northeast and northwest, most likely the result of smaller craters that have merged with the main rim. The interior surface is level and nearly featureless.

This formation is named after French astronomer Ernest Esclangon (1876-1954). Ts designation was officially adopted by the International Astronomical Union in 1976. It was previously designated Macrobius L.
