= Lacus Bonitatis =

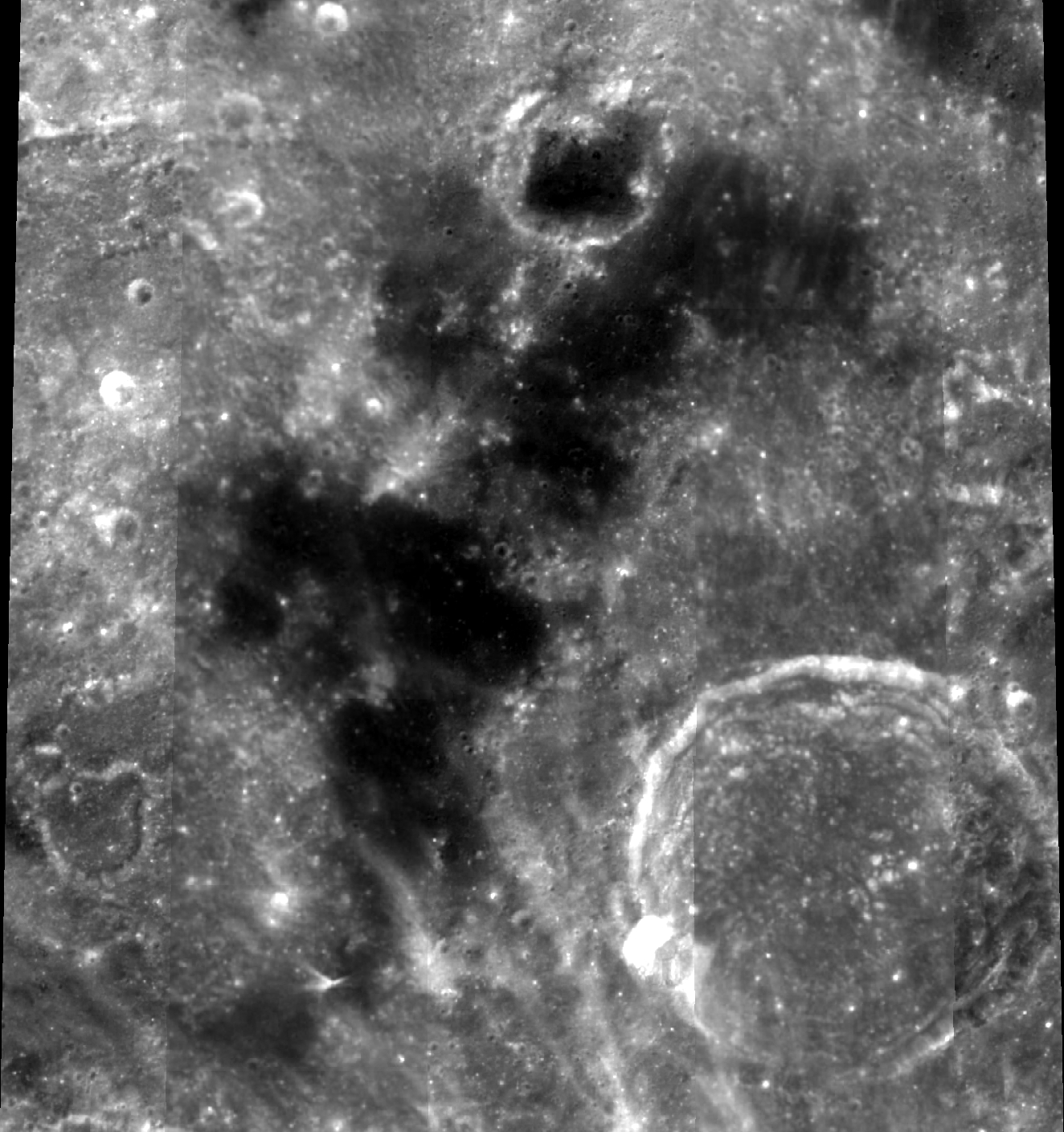
- Coordinates: 23.2°N 44.3°E
- Diameter: 122 km

Lacus Bonitatis (Latin bonitātis, "Lake of Goodness") is a small lunar mare that lies to the northwest of the prominent crater Macrobius and southwest of the bright white looking bowl-shaped crater Tralles A. Further to the north of Lacus Bonitatis is the Montes Taurus mountain range. Southwest of Lacus Bonitatis, the eye-catching pair of bright bowl-shaped craters Carmichael and Hill are noteworthy targets during telescopic observations of the full moon.

This mare is an irregular region of basaltic lava with uneven borders. The mare lies within a diameter of 122 km and the longest dimension trends from the southwest to the northeast. The centre coordinates of Lacus Bonitatis are 23.2°N 44.3°E.

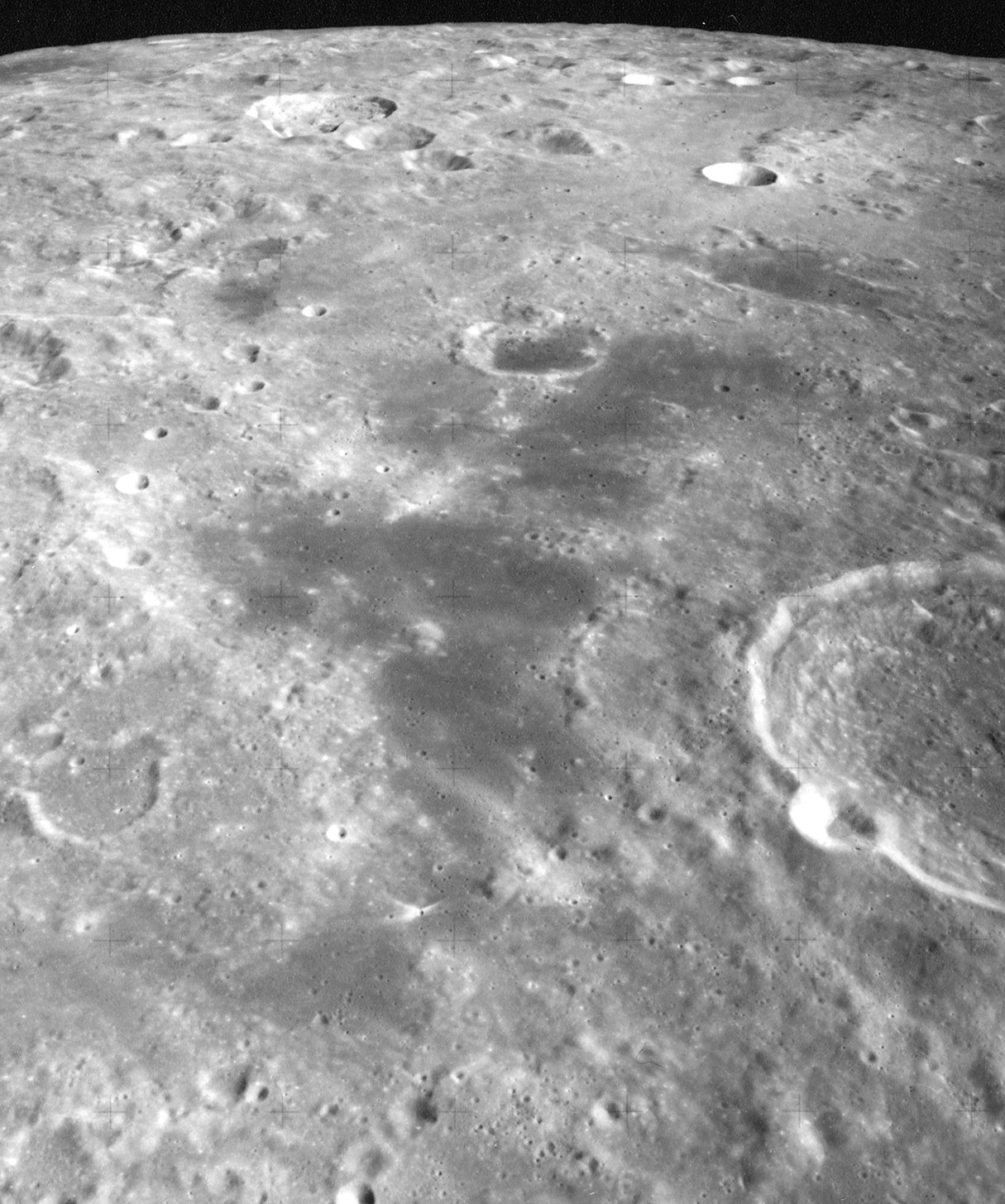
Oblique view from Apollo 17

== See also ==
- Volcanism on the Moon
