= Ernest Esclangon =

French astronomer and mathematician

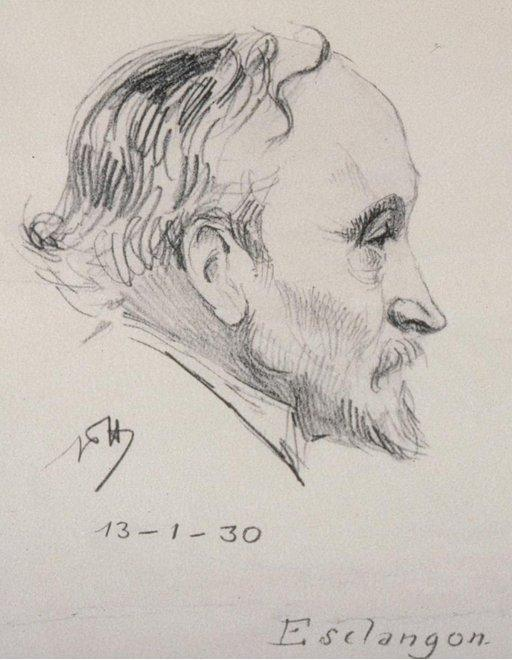
Ernest Esclangon, by Paul Helbronner, 1930.

Ernest Benjamin Esclangon (17 March 1876 – 28 January 1954) was a French astronomer and mathematician.

== Biography ==
Born in Mison, Alpes-de-Haute-Provence, in 1895 he started to study mathematics at the École normale supérieure, graduating in 1898. Looking for some means of financial support while he completed his doctorate on quasi-periodic functions, he took a post at the Bordeaux Observatory, teaching some mathematics at the University of Bordeaux.

During World War I, he worked on ballistics and developed a novel method for precisely locating enemy artillery. When a gun is fired, it initiates a spherical shock wave but the projectile also generates a conical wave. By using the sound of distant guns to compare the two waves, Escaglon was able to make accurate predictions of gun locations.

After the armistice in 1919, Esclangon became director of the Strasbourg Observatory and professor of astronomy at the university the following year. In 1929, he was appointed director of the Paris Observatory and of the International Time Bureau, and elected to the Bureau des Longitudes in 1932. He is perhaps best remembered for initiating in 1933 the first speaking clock service, reportedly to relieve the observatory staff from the numerous telephone calls requesting the exact time. He was elected to the Académie des Sciences in 1939.

His doctoral students include Daniel Barbier, Édmée Chandon, Louis Couffignal, André-Louis Danjon, and Nicolas Stoyko.

Esclangon was the President of the Société astronomique de France (SAF), the French astronomical society, from 1933–1935.

Serving as director of the Paris Observatory throughout World War II and the German occupation of Paris, he retired in 1944. He died in Eyrenville, France.

== Honours ==
In 1935, he received the Prix Jules Janssen, the highest award of the Société astronomique de France.

The binary asteroid 1509 Esclangona is named after him.

The lunar crater Esclangon is named after him.
