= 1509 Esclangona =

Hungaria asteroid and binary system from the inner regions of the asteroid belt

Discovery
- Discovered by: A. Patry
- Discovery site: Nice Obs.
- Discovery date: 21 December 1938

Designations
- Named after: Ernest Esclangon (French astronomer)
- Alternative designations: 1938 YG
- Minor planet category: main-belt · (inner); Hungaria

Orbital characteristics
- Epoch 4 September 2017 (JD 2458000.5)
- Uncertainty parameter 0
- Observation arc: 77.68 yr (28,374 days)
- Aphelion: 1.9263 AU
- Perihelion: 1.8064 AU
- Semi-major axis: 1.8663 AU
- Eccentricity: 0.0321
- Orbital period (sidereal): 2.55 yr (931 days)
- Mean anomaly: 225.08°
- Mean motion: 0° 23^{m} 11.76^{s} / day
- Inclination: 22.320°
- Longitude of ascending node: 283.52°
- Argument of perihelion: 267.82°
- Known satellites: 1

Physical characteristics
- Dimensions: 6.83±1.32 km 7.52±1.78 km 8.17±0.6 km (IRAS:2); 8.18 km (derived); 9.0±1.0 km 9.87±0.37 km
- Synodic rotation period: 2.64±0.02 h 3.247 h 3.247±0.002 h 3.252±0.005 h (Note: Lightcurve plot of 1509 Esclangona Palmer Divide Observatory, B. D. Warner (2013)); 3.2524±0.0003 h 3.25250±0.00005 h 3.25281±0.00002 h (Note: Pravec (2009) web: Date: 2009-10-06. Rotation period 3.25281±0.00002 hours with a brightness amplitude of 0.13 mag. Flagged as binary. Quality code: n.a. Summary figures at Collaborative Asteroid Lightcurve Link (CALL) for (1509) Esclangona); 3.25283±0.00002 h 5.89 h (Note: CALL (2011) web: rotation period 5.89 hours with a brightness amplitude of 0.35 mag. Quality code: n.a. Summary figures at Collaborative Asteroid Lightcurve Link (CALL) for (1509) Esclangona)
- Geometric albedo: 0.107±0.021; 0.160±0.013; 0.185±0.055; 0.2041 (derived); 0.2327±0.038 (IRAS:2); 0.30±0.14; 0.41±0.18
- Spectral type: Tholen = S · K · S B–V = 0.894; U–B = 0.472
- Absolute magnitude (H): 12.33±0.14 (R) · 12.64 · 12.79 · 12.858±0.149 · 13.28±0.0

1509 Esclangona (provisional designation 1938 YG) is a rare-type Hungaria asteroid and binary system from the inner regions of the asteroid belt, approximately 8 kilometers in diameter. It is named after French astronomer Ernest Esclangon.

== Discoveries ==
Esclangona was discovered on 21 December 1938, by French astronomer André Patry at Nice Observatory. The body's observation arc begins with its official discovery observation as no precoveries were taken, and no prior identifications were made. On 13 February 2003, a satellite was discovered by astronomers at ESO's Very Large Telescope (UT4) on Cerro Paranal in Chile.

== Orbit and classification ==
Esclangona is a member of the Hungaria family, which form the innermost concentration of asteroids in the Solar System. It orbits the Sun in the inner main-belt at a distance of 1.8–1.9 AU once every 2 years and 7 months (931 days). Its orbit has an eccentricity of 0.03 and an inclination of 22° with respect to the ecliptic.

== Binary system ==
Esclangona has a small moon, provisionally designated S/2003 (1509) 1, which measures 4 kilometers in diameter, and orbits 140 kilometers from its parent. This wide separation relative to the pair's size is rather unusual and it is believed that both Esclangona and its moon are ejecta from an asteroidal collision in the past that left the scene as a co-orbiting pair; a similar pairing is 3749 Balam and its outer moon.

== Physical characteristics ==
In the Tholen taxonomy, Esclangona is a common stony S-type asteroid. It has since been characterized as a rare K-type asteroid by polarimetric observations.

=== Rotation period ===
In December 2004, photometric measurements of Esclangona made by American astronomer Brian Warner at his Palmer Divide Observatory, California, showed a lightcurve with a rotation period of 3.247±0.002 hours and a brightness variation of 0.17±0.02 in magnitude.

=== Diameter and albedo ===
According to the surveys carried out by the Infrared Astronomical Satellite IRAS, the Japanese Akari satellite, and NASA's Wide-field Infrared Survey Explorer with its subsequent NEOWISE mission, Esclangona measures between 6.83 and 9.87 kilometers in diameter and its surface has an albedo between 0.107 and 0.41. The Collaborative Asteroid Lightcurve Link derives an albedo of 0.2041 and a diameter of 8.18 kilometers with an absolute magnitude of 12.858.

== Naming ==
This minor planet was named after French astronomer Ernest Esclangon (1876–1954), was a director of the Paris Observatory and president of the International Astronomical Union. Naming citation was first mentioned in The Names of the Minor Planets by Paul Herget in 1955 (H 134).
