= Macrobius (crater) =

Crater on the Moon

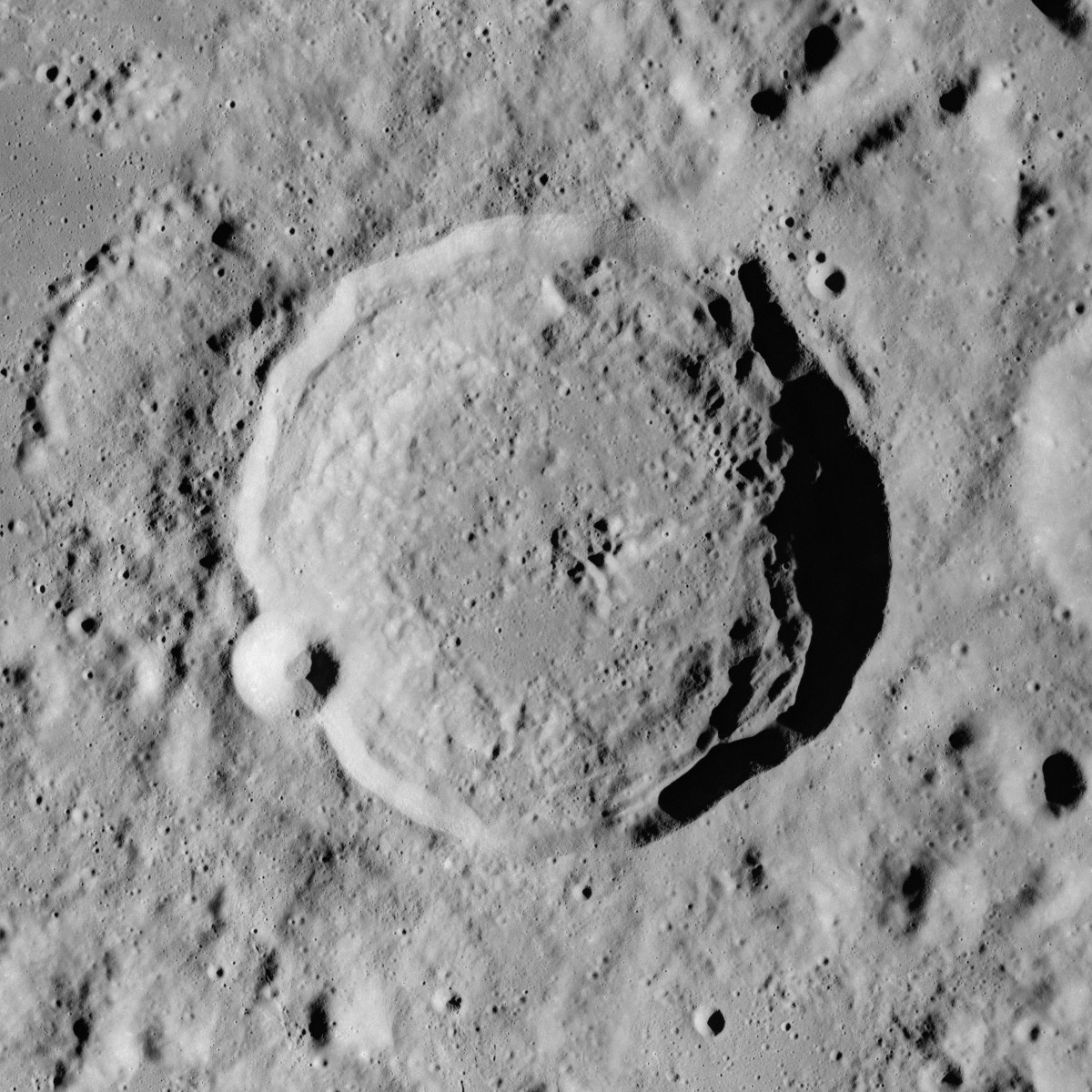
- Apollo 17 mapping camera image
- Coordinates: 21.26°N 45.97°E
- Diameter: 62.79 km (39.02 mi)
- Depth: 3.9 km
- Colongitude: 314° at sunrise
- Formation: Lower Imbrian
- Eponym: Macrobius

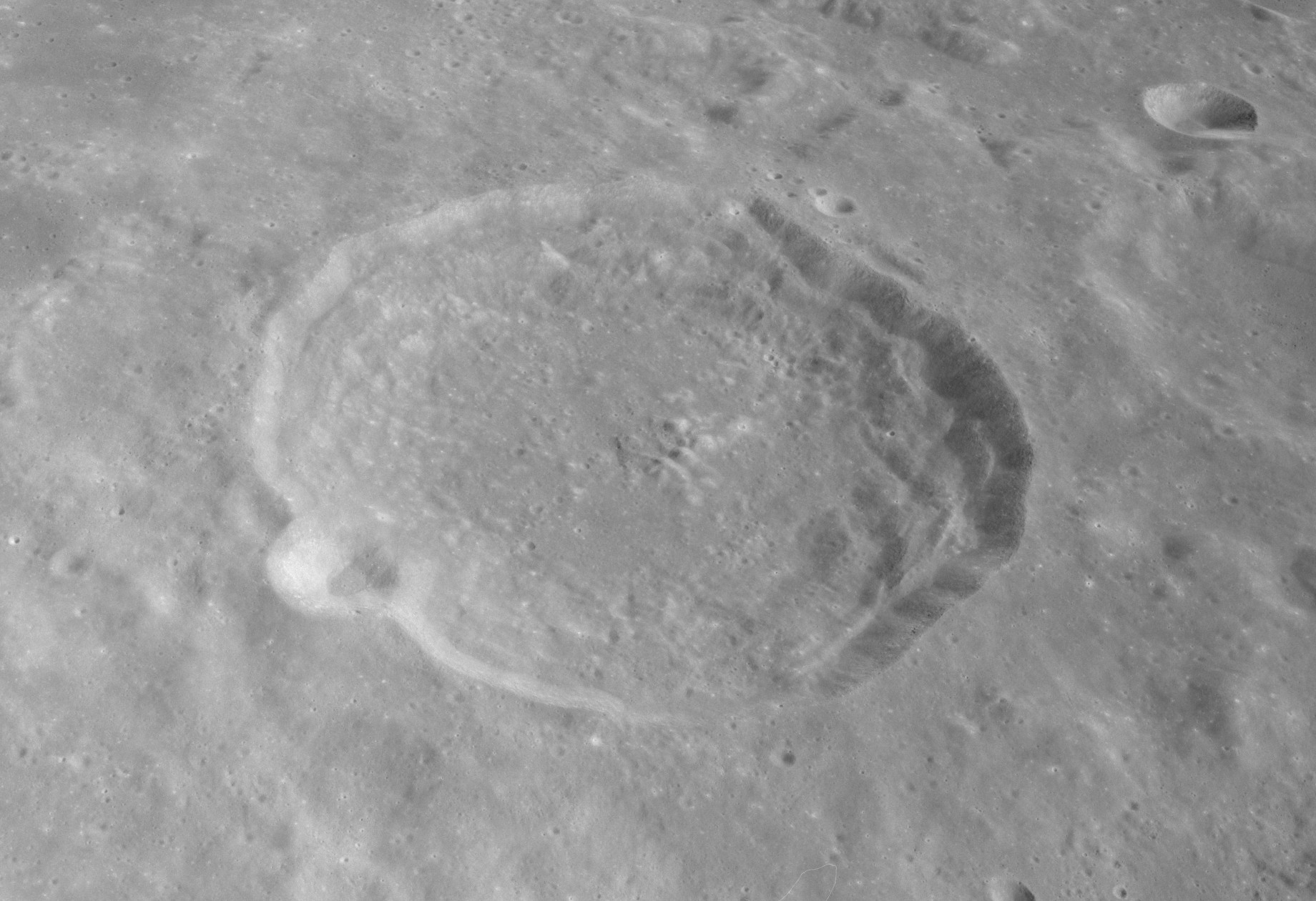
Oblique view from Apollo 17

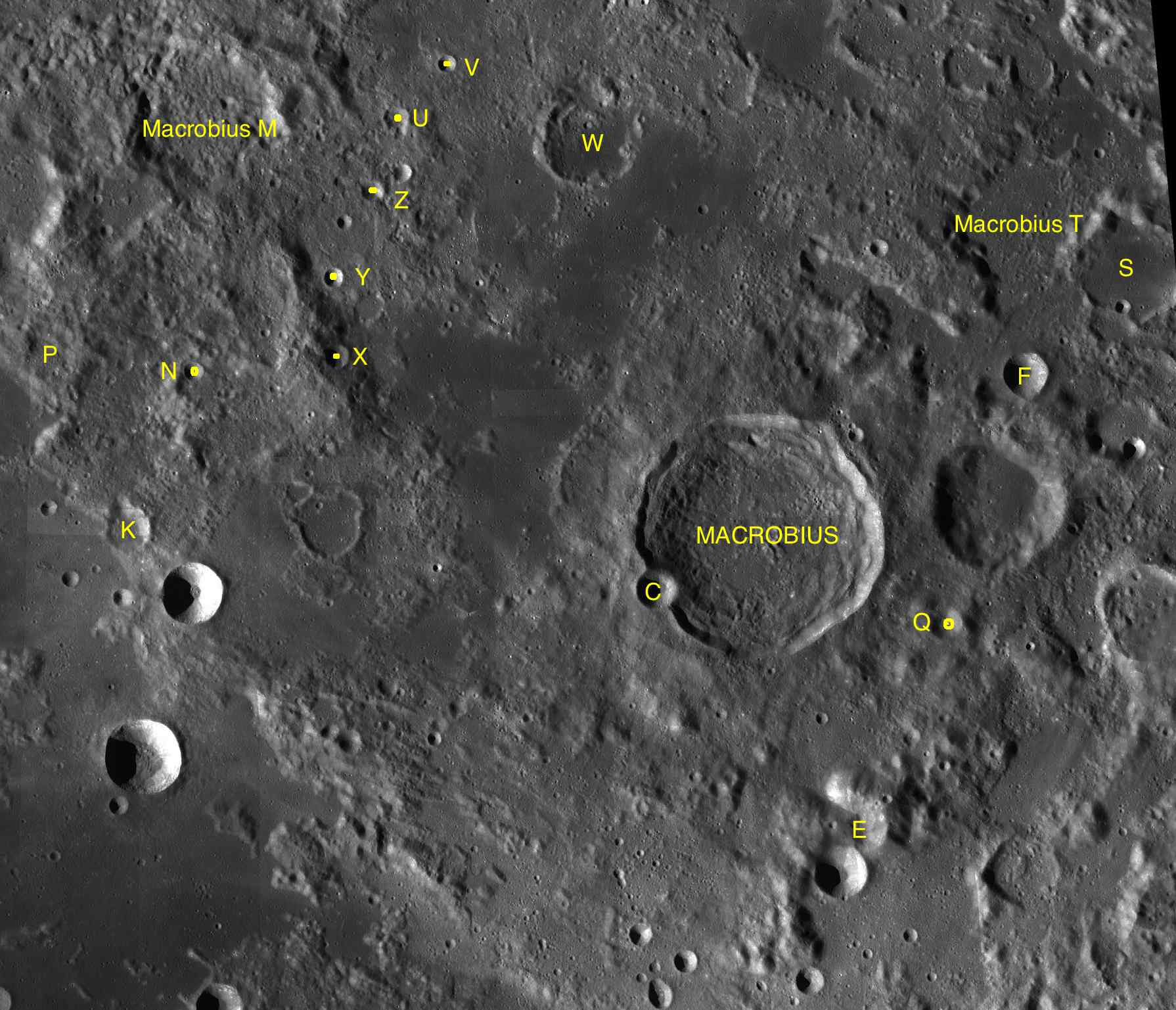
Satellite craters of Macrobius

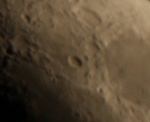
Macrobius at center, near the terminator as viewed from Earth, with Mare Crisium to the right

Macrobius is a prominent lunar impact crater located to the northwest of the Mare Crisium. Its diameter is 63 km. It was named after ancient Roman writer Macrobius. It lies on the southeast edge of the Lacus Bonitatis, a small lunar mare. The somewhat smaller crater Tisserand lies just to the east.

On the lunar geologic timescale, Macrobius dates to the Lower (Early) Imbrian age. The outer wall of Macrobius has a multiply terraced inner surface, with some slumping along the top of the rim. The small satellite crater Macrobius C lies across the western rim, but the wall is otherwise relatively free of significant wear. In the center of the floor is a central mountain complex. There is a low ridge in the western interior, but the remainder of the floor is relatively level.

== Satellite craters ==
By convention these features are identified on lunar maps by placing the letter on the side of the crater midpoint that is closest to Macrobius.

Macrobius	Latitude	Longitude	Diameter
C	20.8° N	45.0° E	10 km
E	18.7° N	46.8° E	10 km
F	22.5° N	48.5° E	11 km
K	21.5° N	40.2° E	12 km
M	25.0° N	41.0° E	42 km
N	22.8° N	40.8° E	5 km
P	23.0° N	39.5° E	18 km
Q	20.4° N	47.6° E	9 km
S	23.3° N	49.6° E	26 km
T	23.8° N	48.6° E	29 km
U	25.0° N	42.8° E	6 km
V	25.4° N	43.3° E	5 km
W	24.8° N	44.6° E	26 km
X	23.0° N	42.2° E	4 km
Y	23.6° N	42.2° E	5 km
Z	24.3° N	42.6° E	5 km

The following craters have been renamed by the IAU.

- Macrobius A — See Carmichael.
- Macrobius B — See Hill.
- Macrobius D — See Fredholm.
- Macrobius L — See Esclangon.
