= Leonard Carmichael =

American educator and psychologist

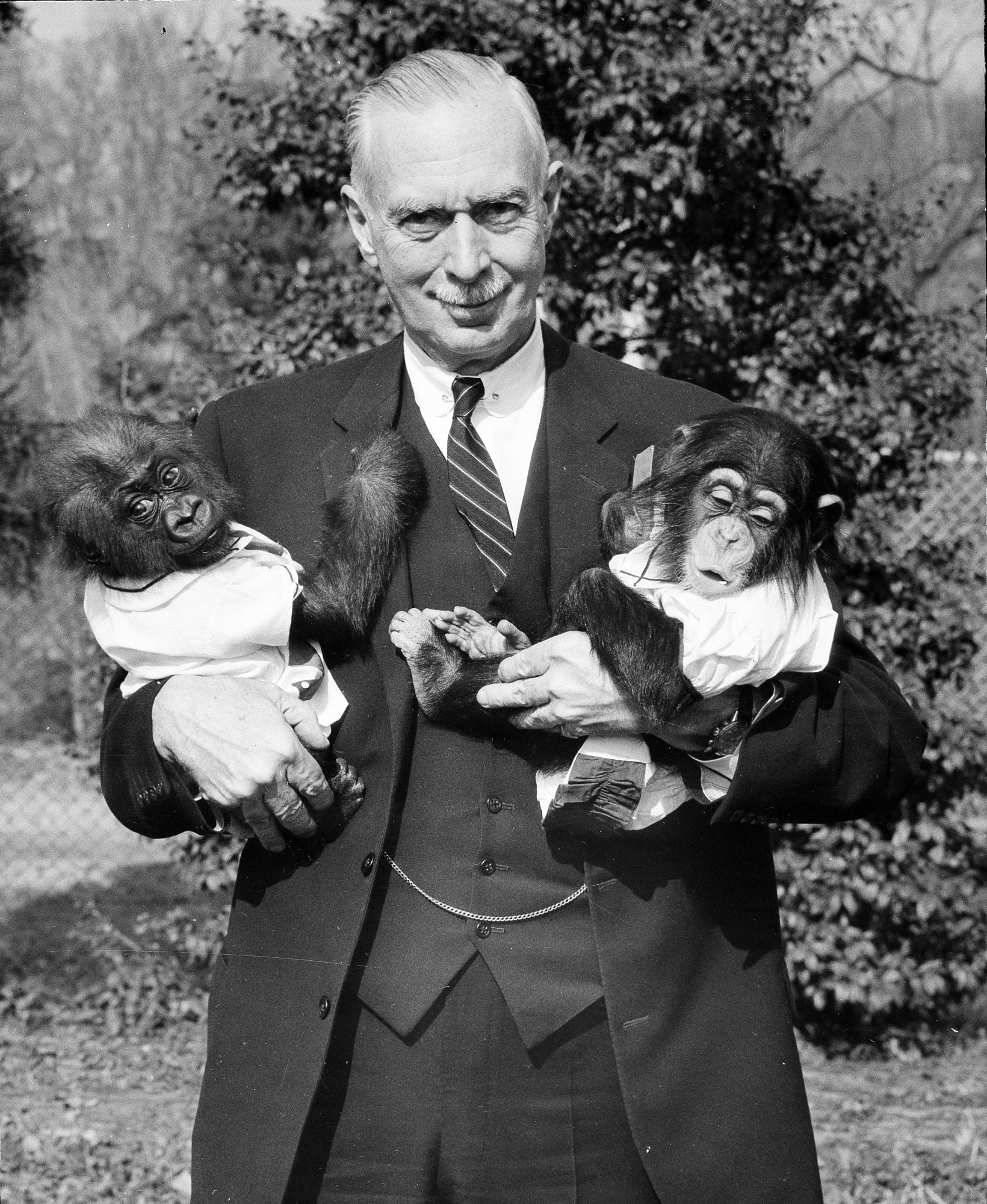

7th Secretary of the Smithsonian Institution
- In office 1953–1964
- Preceded by: Alexander Wetmore
- Succeeded by: Sidney Dillon Ripley

7th President of Tufts College
- In office 1938–1952
- Preceded by: George Stewart Miller
- Succeeded by: Nils Yngve Wessell

Personal details
- Born: November 9, 1898 Philadelphia, Pennsylvania, US
- Died: September 16, 1973 (aged 74) Washington, DC, US
- Known for: Psychology
- Awards: Public Welfare Medal (1972)
- Scientific career
- Education: Tufts University (BS); Harvard University (PhD)
- Institutions: National Geographic
- Doctoral advisor: Walter Fenno Dearborn
- Notable students: Harold Schlosberg

Leonard Carmichael (November 9, 1898 – September 16, 1973) was an American educator and psychologist. In addition, he became the seventh secretary of the Smithsonian Institution in 1953.

== Education and academic career ==
Carmichael, the son of a physician and a teacher, was born in 1898, in Germantown, Pennsylvania. He received his B.S. degree from Tufts University in 1921, and his PhD from Harvard University in 1924. He was a brother in the Theta Delta Chi fraternity during his time at Tufts. He became an instructor at Princeton University's Department of Psychology in 1924 and was appointed to assistant professor in 1926. In 1927 he joined the faculty at Brown University, where he taught for fourteen years and did research on the behavior of primates. He was elected to the American Academy of Arts and Sciences in 1932 and the American Philosophical Society in 1942. In 1937 he moved to the University of Rochester and then, in 1938, he was appointed president of Tufts University, where he remained until his departure for the Smithsonian in 1953.

== Secretary of the Smithsonian ==
Carmichael served as the secretary of the Smithsonian Institution from 1953 to 1964. He was the first Secretary to be hired from outside the Institution, rather than promoted from within. During Carmichael's tenure, the National Portrait Gallery was created, the Patent Office Building was acquired for the American Art and Portrait Galleries, and the Museum of History and Technology (now the National Museum of American History) was opened. New wings were added to the National Museum of Natural History, the Hope Diamond was donated by Harry Winston, and the Fénykövi elephant was unveiled in the rotunda of the Natural History Museum. The Smithsonian Astrophysical Observatory was revitalized and moved to Cambridge, Massachusetts. In 1957, when Sputnik was launched, the observatory was the only US lab capable of tracking the Soviet satellite. After the death of a visitor at the National Zoological Park, Carmichael sought additional funding for major improvements to meet safety regulations. The Friends of the National Zoo was created and a Master Plan for zoo improvement was formulated and initiated.

== Later life and legacy ==
After leaving the Smithsonian, Carmichael became vice-president for research and exploration of the National Geographic Society. In 1972 he was awarded the Public Welfare Medal from the National Academy of Sciences, of which he was also a member. A Tufts University's community service organization, the Leonard Carmichael Society; Carmichael Hall, a dormitory and dining hall on the Tufts campus; and the lunar crater Carmichael were all named in his honor.

Carmichael is sometimes mentioned in connection with the MKULTRA project.

He died on September 16, 1973.
