= Tisserand's parameter =

Orbit parameter conserved in the three-body problem

Tisserand's parameter (or Tisserand's invariant) is a number calculated from several orbital elements (semi-major axis, orbital eccentricity, and inclination) of a relatively small object and a larger "perturbing body". It is used to distinguish different kinds of orbits. The term is named after French astronomer Félix Tisserand who derived it and applies to restricted three-body problems in which the three objects all differ greatly in mass.

== Definition ==
For a small body with semi-major axis $a\,\!$, orbital eccentricity $e\,\!$, and orbital inclination $i\,\!$, relative to the orbit of a perturbing larger body with semimajor axis $a_P$, the parameter is defined as follows:

$$T_P\ = \frac{a_P}{a} + 2\cos i\sqrt{\frac{a}{a_P} (1-e^2)}$$

== Tisserand invariant conservation ==
In the three-body problem, the quasi-conservation of Tisserand's invariant is derived as the limit of the Jacobi integral away from the main two bodies (usually the star and planet). Numerical simulations show that the Tisserand invariant of orbit-crossing bodies is conserved in the three-body problem on Gigayear timescales.

== Applications ==
The Tisserand parameter's conservation was originally used by Tisserand to determine whether or not an observed orbiting body is the same as one previously observed. This is usually known as the Tisserand's criterion.

=== Orbit classification ===
The value of the Tisserand parameter with respect to the planet that most perturbs a small body in the Solar System can be used to delineate groups of objects that may have similar origins.

- T_{J}, Tisserand's parameter with respect to Jupiter as perturbing body, is frequently used to distinguish asteroids (typically $T_J > 3$) from Jupiter-family comets (typically $2< T_J < 3$).
- The minor planet group of damocloids are defined by a Jupiter Tisserand's parameter of 2 or less (T_{J} ≤ 2).
- T_{N}, Tisserand's parameter with respect to Neptune, has been suggested to distinguish near-scattered (affected by Neptune) from extended-scattered trans-Neptunian objects (not affected by Neptune; e.g. 90377 Sedna).
- T_{N}, Tisserand's parameter with respect to Neptune may also be used to distinguish Neptune-crossing trans-Neptunian objects that may be injected onto retrograde and polar Centaur orbits ( –1 ≤T_{N} ≤ 2 ) and those that may be injected onto prograde Centaur orbits ( 2 ≤T_{N} ≤ 2.82).

=== Other uses ===
- The quasi-conservation of Tisserand's parameter constrains the orbits attainable using gravity assist for outer Solar System exploration.
- Tisserand's parameter could be used to infer the presence of an intermediate-mass black hole at the center of the Milky Way using the motions of orbiting stars.

== Related notions ==
The parameter is derived from one of the so-called Delaunay standard variables, used to study the perturbed Hamiltonian in a three-body system. Ignoring higher-order perturbation terms, the following value is conserved:

$$\sqrt{a (1-e^2)} \cos i$$

Consequently, perturbations may lead to the resonance between the orbital inclination and eccentricity, known as Kozai resonance. Near-circular, highly inclined orbits can thus become very eccentric in exchange for lower inclination. For example, such a mechanism can produce sungrazing comets, because a large eccentricity with a constant semimajor axis results in a small perihelion.

== See also ==
- Tisserand's relation for the derivation and the detailed assumptions
