= Tisseur =

Tisseur is a French occupational surname meaning "weaver". Notable people with the surname include:

- Clair Tisseur (1827–1896), French architect
- Françoise Tisseur, French mathematician

== See also ==
- Tisserand
- Le Tellier
