= Félix Tisserand =

French astronomer (1845–1896)

François Félix Tisserand
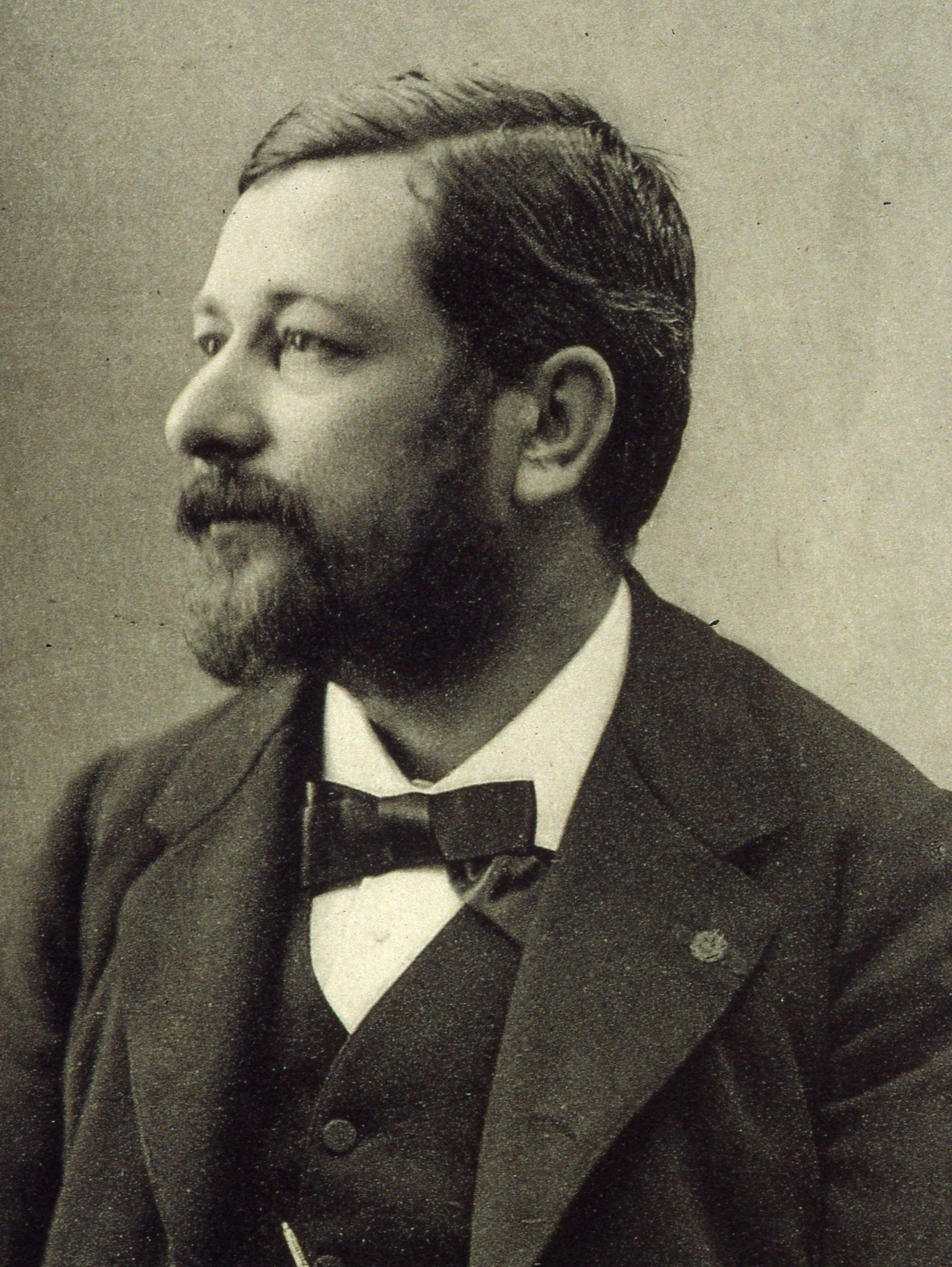
- Born: 13 January 1845; Nuits-Saint-Georges, Côte-d'Or
- Died: 20 October 1896 (aged 51)
- Known for: Traité de mécanique céleste
- Scientific career
- Fields: Astronomy
- Workplaces: Paris Observatory; Toulouse Observatory
- Thesis: Exposition, d'après les principes de Jacobi, de la méthode suivie par M. Delaunay dans sa Théorie du mouvement de la Lune autour de la Terre (1868)

François Félix Tisserand (French pronunciation: [fʁɑ̃swa feliks tisʁɑ̃]; 13 January 1845 – 20 October 1896) was a French astronomer.

== Life ==
Tisserand was born at Nuits-Saint-Georges, Côte-d'Or. In 1863 he entered the École Normale Supérieure, and on leaving he went for a month as professor at the lycée at Metz. Urbain Le Verrier offered him a post in the Paris Observatory, which he entered as astronome adjoint in September 1866. In 1868 he took his doctor's degree with a thesis on Delaunay's Method, which he showed to be of much wider scope than had been contemplated by its inventor. Shortly afterwards he went out to Kra Isthmus with Édouard Stephan and Georges Rayet to observe the 1868 solar eclipse. The French astronomers were accompanied by Mongkut, the King of Siam who had calculated the location and the date of the eclipse by himself two years before and prepared a comfortable watching place for the scientists.

In 1873 he was appointed director of the observatory at Toulouse, where he published his Recueil d'exercices sur le calcul infinitesimal, and in 1874 became corresponding member of the Académie des Sciences. He took part in the French expeditions of 1874, accompanied by Jules Janssen, to Japan, and in 1882, accompanied by Guillaume Bigourdan, to Martinique to observe the transits of Venus. In 1878 he was elected a member of the Académie des Sciences in succession to Le Verrier, and became a member of the Bureau des Longitudes. In the same year he was appointed professeur suppliant to Liouville, and in 1883 he succeeded Puiseux in the chair of celestial mechanics at the Sorbonne.

Tisserand always found time to continue his important researches in mathematical astronomy, and the pages of the Comptes rendus bear witness to his activity. His writings relate to almost every branch of celestial mechanics, and are always distinguished by rigour and simplicity in the solution of the most difficult problems. He treated in a masterly manner (Bulletin astronomique, 1889) the theory of the capture of comets by the larger planets, and in this connection published his valuable Criterion for establishing the identity of a periodic comet, whatever may have been the perturbations brought about in its orbit, between successive appearances, by the action of a planet.

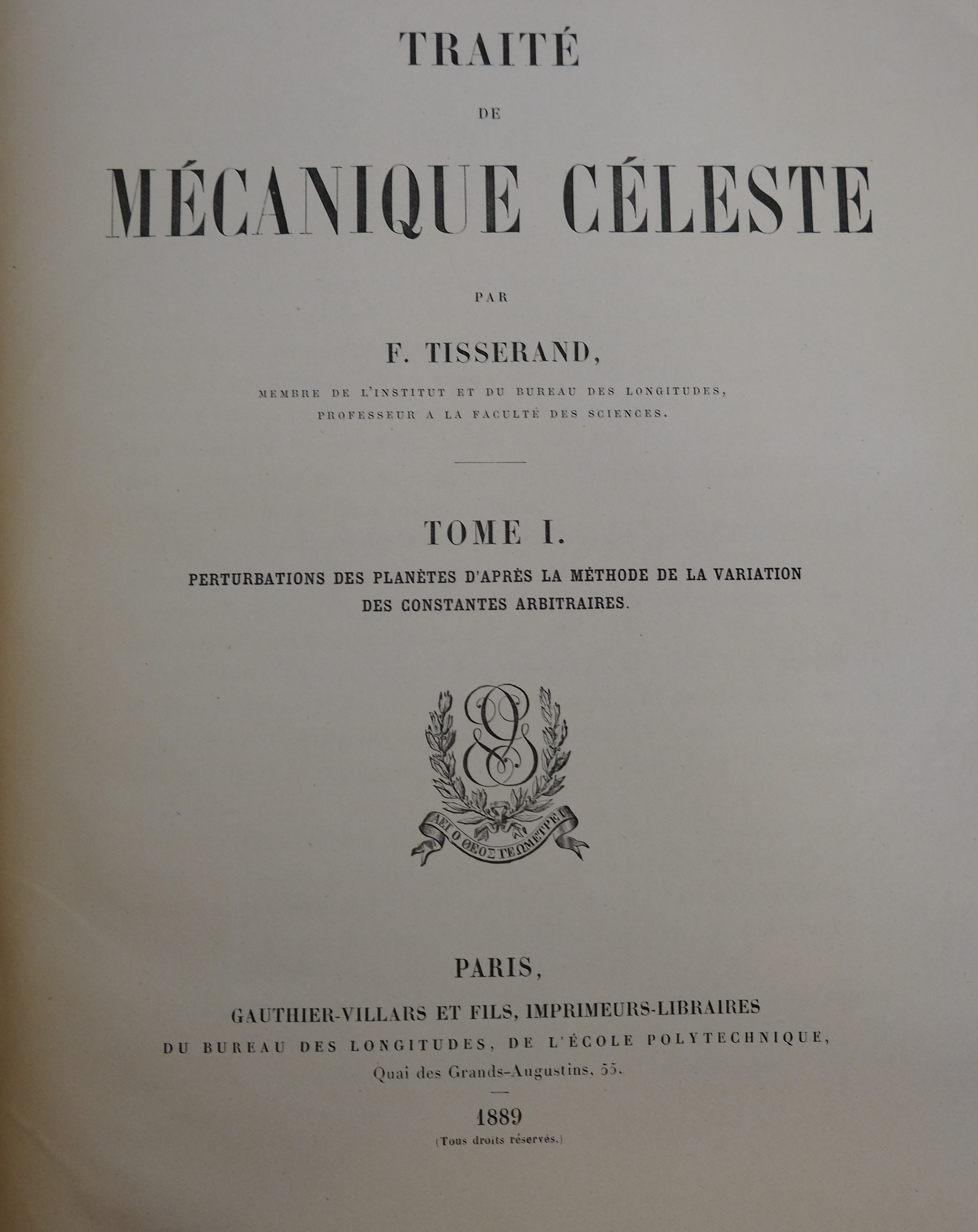
Title page to volume I of Traité de Mécanique Céleste (1889)

His principal work, Traité de mécanique céleste, is a lasting monument to his memory, and is worthy to stand beside the Mécanique céleste of his fellow-countryman Laplace. In this treatise, published in four quarto volumes, the last of which appeared only a few months before his death, he fused into one whole the researches of Laplace and those of other workers in the same field since his time. It furnishes a complete résumé of the state of knowledge in that department of astronomy at the end, as Laplace's work did for the beginning, of the 19th century.

In 1892 he succeeded Mouchez as director of the Paris Observatory, and as president of the committee of the photographic chart of the heavens he contributed largely to the success of that great project. Under his direction the revision of Lalande's catalogue was brought almost to completion, and four volumes of the Annales de l'Observatoire de Paris exhibit the progress made in this important undertaking. He was also editor of the Bulletin astronomique from the beginning, and contributed many important articles to its pages. He died suddenly, in the fullness of his power, of congestion of the brain.

He was elected a member of the Royal Swedish Academy of Sciences in 1892. In 1894 he became foreign member of the Royal Netherlands Academy of Arts and Sciences.

Tisserand served as President of the Société Astronomique de France (SAF), the French astronomical society, from 1893-1895.

The crater Tisserand on the Moon is named after him, as is the asteroid 3663 Tisserand.

== See also ==
- Tisserand's parameter
- Tisserand's criterion
