= Tisserand's criterion =

Tisserand's criterion is used to determine whether or not an observed orbiting body, such as a comet or an asteroid, is the same as a previously observed orbiting body.

While all the orbital parameters of an object orbiting the Sun during the close encounter with another massive body (e.g. Jupiter) can be changed dramatically, the value of a function of these parameters, called Tisserand's relation (due to Félix Tisserand) is approximately conserved, making it possible to recognize the orbit after the encounter.

== Definition ==
Tisserand's criterion is computed in a circular restricted three-body system. In a circular restricted three-body system, one of the masses is assumed to be much smaller than the other two. The other two masses are assumed to be in a circular orbit about the system's center of mass. In addition, Tisserand's criterion also relies on the assumptions that a) one of the two larger masses is much smaller than the other large mass and b) the comet or asteroid has not had a close approach to any other large mass.

Two observed orbiting bodies are possibly the same if they satisfy or nearly satisfy Tisserand's criterion:

$$\frac{1}{2a_1} + \sqrt{a_1(1-e_1^2)} \cos i_1 = \frac{1}{2a_2} + \sqrt{a_2(1-e_2^2)} \cos i_2$$

where a is the semi-major axis (in units of the second body's semi-major axis), e is the eccentricity, and i is the inclination of the small body's orbit relative to the second body.

In other words, if a function of the orbital elements (named Tisserand's parameter) of the first observed body (nearly) equals the same function calculated with the orbital elements of the second observed body, the two bodies might be the same.

== Tisserand's relation ==
The relation defines a function of orbital parameters, conserved approximately when the third body is far from the second (perturbing) mass.

$$\frac{1}{2a} + \sqrt{a(1-e^2)} \cos i \approx {\rm const}$$

The relation is derived from the Jacobi constant selecting a suitable unit system and using some approximations. Traditionally, the units are chosen in order to make μ_{1} and the (constant) distance from μ_{2} to μ_{1} a unity, resulting in mean motion n also being a unity in this system.

In addition, given the very large mass of μ_{1} compared μ_{2} and μ_{3}

$$G (\mu_1+\mu_2) \approx 1 \approx G (\mu_1+\mu_3)$$

These conditions are satisfied for example for the Sun–Jupiter system with a comet or a spacecraft being the third mass.

The Jacobi constant, a function of coordinates ξ, η, ζ, (distances r_{1}, r_{2} from the two masses) and the velocities remains the constant of motion through the encounter.

$$C_J=2 \cdot(\frac{\mu_1}{r_1}+\frac{\mu_2}{r_2})+ 2n(\xi \dot \eta- \eta \dot \xi) - (\dot \xi ^2+\dot \eta ^2+\dot \zeta^2)$$

The goal is to express the constant using orbital parameters.

It is assumed, that far from the mass μ_{2}, the test particle (comet, spacecraft) is on an orbit around μ_{1} resulting from two-body solution. First, the last term in the constant is the velocity, so it can be expressed, sufficiently far from the perturbing mass μ_{2}, as a function of the distance and semi-major axis alone using vis-viva equation

$$(\dot \xi ^2+\dot \eta ^2+\dot \zeta^2) =v^2=\mu\left({{2 \over{r}} - {1 \over{a}}}\right)$$

Second, observing that the $\zeta$ component of the angular momentum (per unit mass) $\mathbf{h}=\mathbf{r}\times\mathbf{\dot r}$ is

$$\xi \dot \eta- \eta \dot \xi = h \cos I$$

where $I\,\!$ is the mutual inclination of the orbits of μ_{3} and μ_{2}, and $h=| \mathbf{h} |=\sqrt{a(1-e^2)}$.

Substituting these into the Jacobi constant C_{J}, ignoring the term with μ_{2}<<1 and replacing r_{1} with r (given very large μ_{1} the barycenter of the system μ_{1}, μ_{3} is very close to the position of μ_{1}) gives

$$\frac{1}{2a} + \sqrt{a(1-e^2)} \cos i \approx {\rm const}$$

== See also ==
- Orbital elements
- Orbital mechanics
- n-body problem
