= Tisserand (crater) =

Crater on the Moon

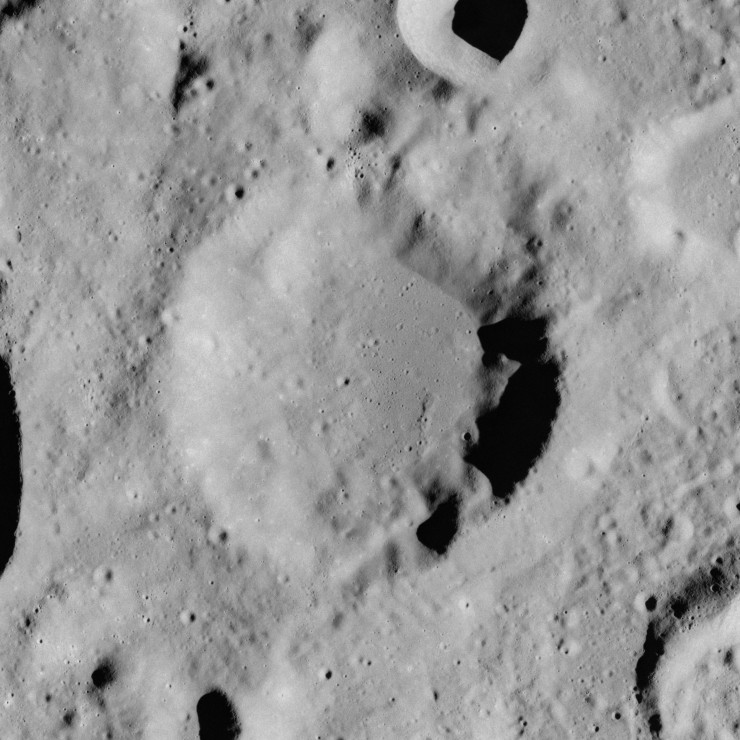
- Apollo 17 mapping camera image
- Coordinates: 21.41°N 48.17°E
- Diameter: 34.63 km (21.52 mi)
- Depth: 2.8 km
- Colongitude: 312° at sunrise
- Formation: Nectarian
- Eponym: François F. Tisserand

Tisserand is a lunar impact crater located just to the east of the larger crater Macrobius, to the northwest of the Mare Crisium. The crater was named after French astronomer François Félix Tisserand in 1935.

The rim of Tisserand has been eroded by impacts, with depressions on the southern and northeastern sides and a winding valley cutting into the inner wall along the northwest. The interior floor is relatively level, with low ridges near the eastern and western inner walls. The eastern half of the floor has a slightly lower albedo than the western half, with the latter part being lightly coated by ray material from Proclus to the south.

Tisserand is a crater of Nectarian age.

== Satellite craters ==
By convention these features are identified on lunar maps by placing the letter on the side of the crater midpoint that is closest to Tisserand.

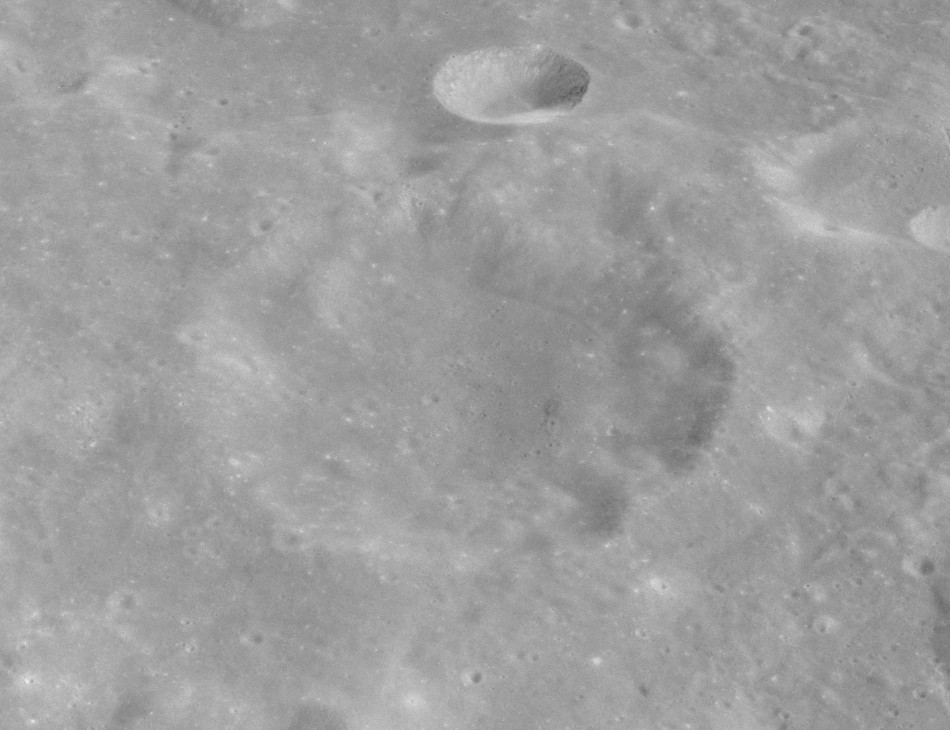
Oblique view also from Apollo 17

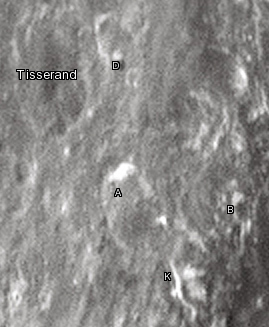
Tisserand and its satellite craters taken from Earth in 2012 at the University of Hertfordshire's Bayfordbury Observatory with the telescopes Meade LX200 14" and Lumenera Skynyx 2-1

Tisserand	Latitude	Longitude	Diameter
A	20.4° N	49.4° E	24 km
B	20.7° N	51.3° E	8 km
D	21.7° N	49.4° E	7 km
K	19.8° N	50.4° E	11 km
