= Carmichael (crater) =

Crater on the Moon

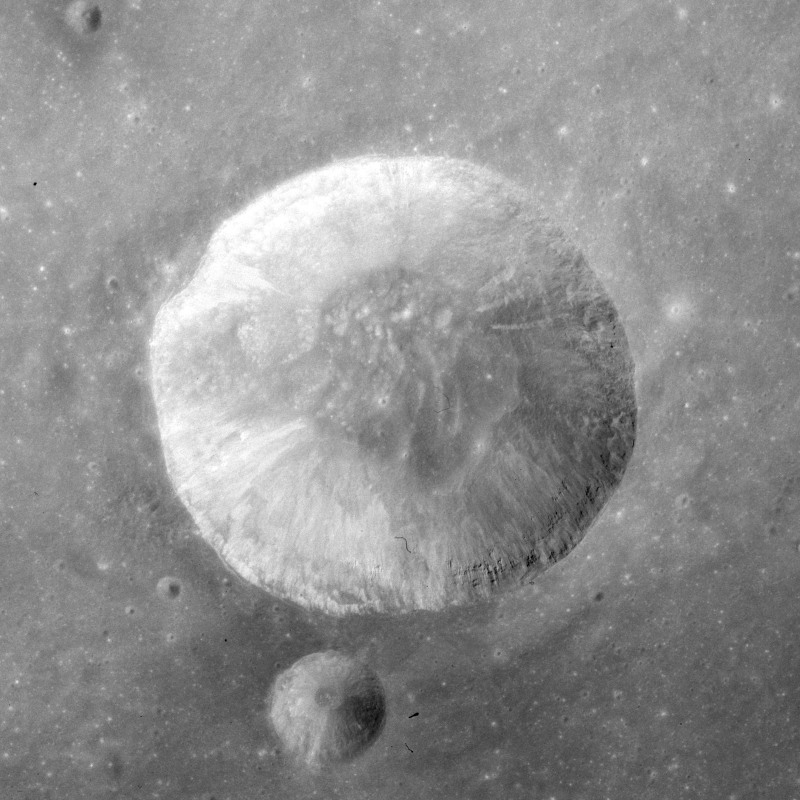
- Apollo 15 image
- Coordinates: 19.6°N 40.4°E
- Diameter: 19.73 km (12.26 mi)
- Depth: 2.75 km (1.71 mi)
- Colongitude: 320° at sunrise
- Eponym: Leonard Carmichael

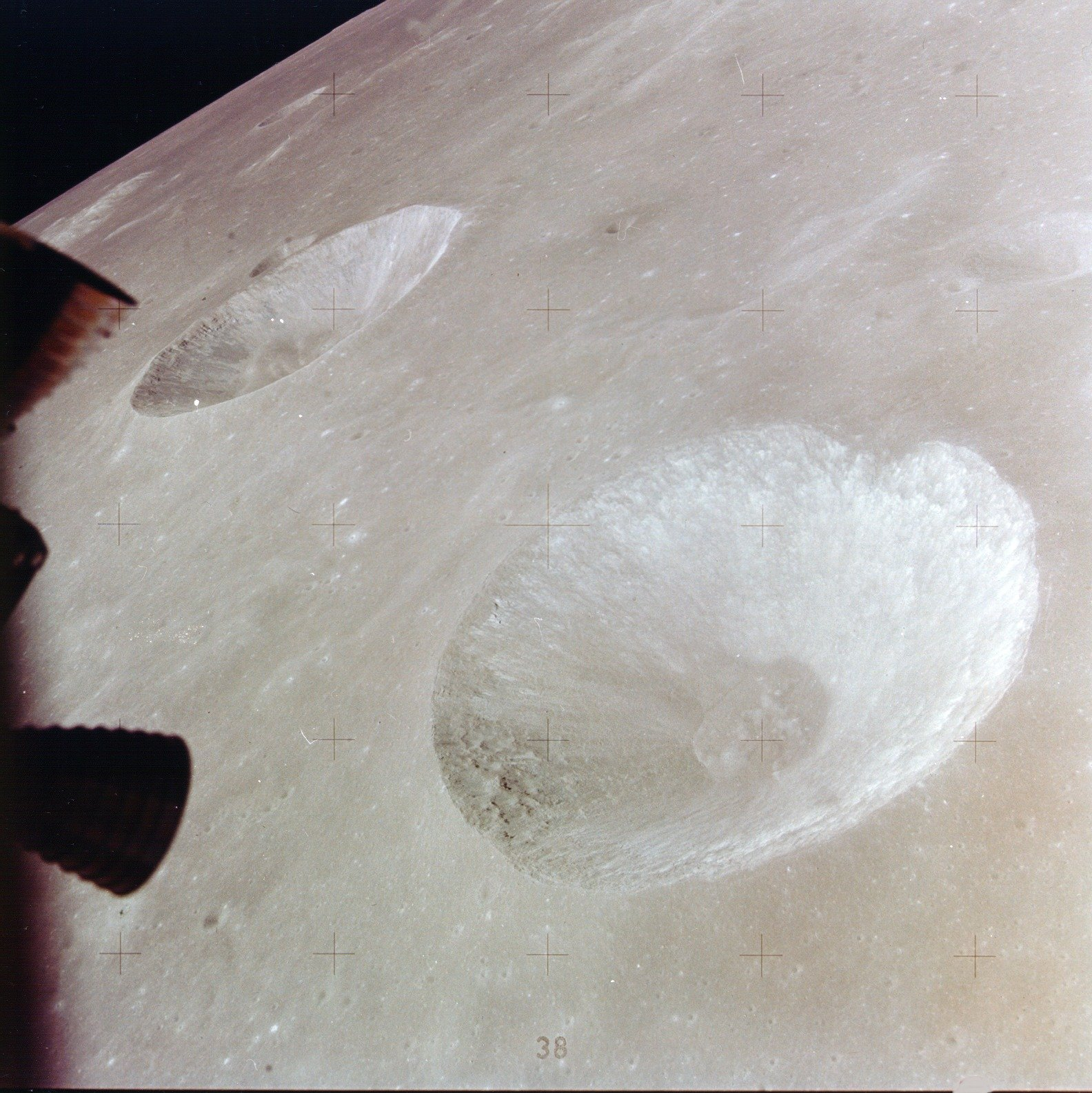
Carmichael crater (upper left) and Hill crater (lower right) from Apollo 15. NASA photo.

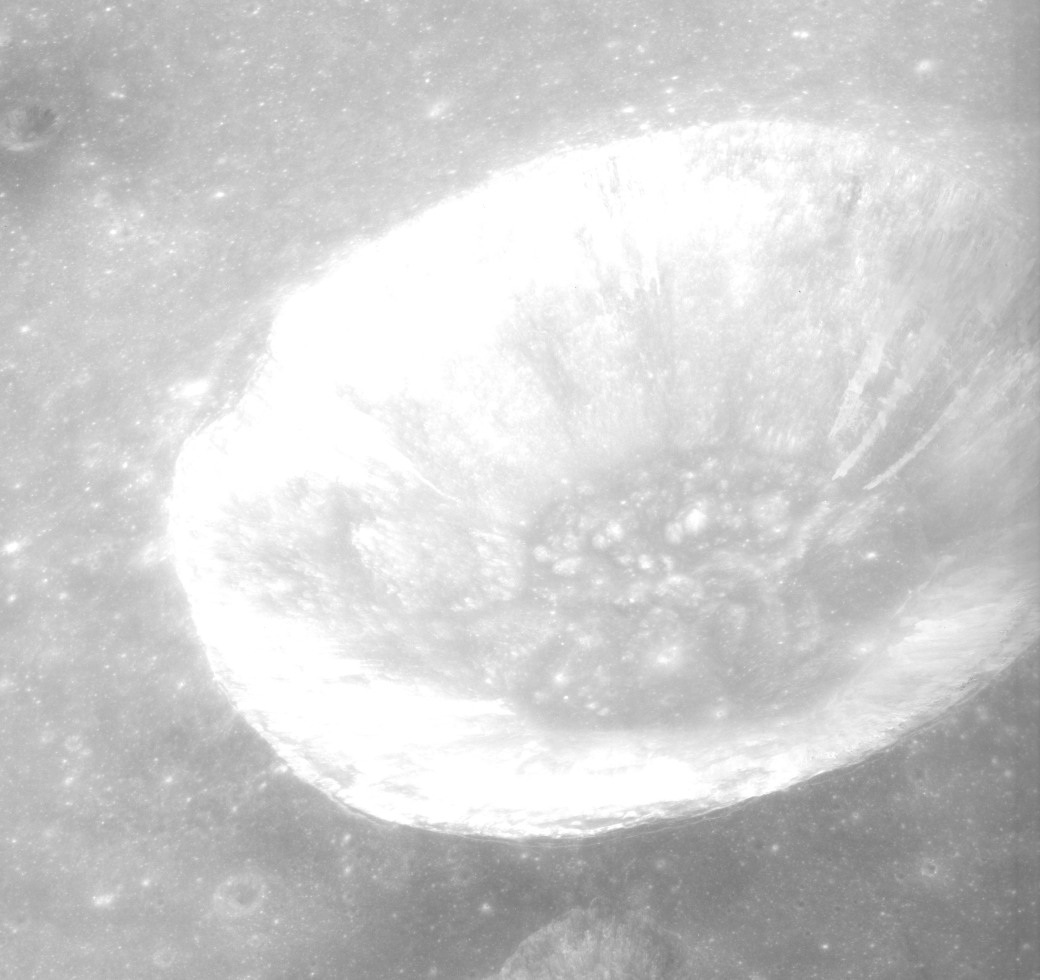
Oblique view of Carmichael also from Apollo 15

Carmichael is a lunar impact crater that is located along the eastern edge of the mare surface named Sinus Amoris, in the northeastern quadrant of the Moon's near side. Its diameter is 20 km. Carmichael lies within a couple of crater diameters south-southwest of the smaller crater Hill. Further to the east-northeast is the prominent crater Macrobius.

Carmichael is generally circular, with a small floor at the middle of the sloping interior walls. There is a low rise of scree along the southeast inner wall. The crater is free of notable impacts along the rim or the interior, although a tiny craterlet is situated in the lunar mare just outside the rim to the south-southwest.

Previously identified as satellite feature Macrobius A, this crater is named after American psychologist Leonard Carmichael (1898-1973). Its designation was officially adopted by the International Astronomical Union in 1973.

== Carmichael and Hill before and during full moon ==
The distinct couple of bright bowl-shaped craters Carmichael and Hill forms with the even brighter raycrater Proclus southeast of the couple a noteworthy trio before and after full moon. The brightness of these three high albedo craters is noticeable on the photographic versions of charts LAC 43 (page 86) and LAC 61 (page 122) in The Clementine Atlas of the Moon (Bussey / Spudis).
