= Hill (crater) =

Crater on the Moon

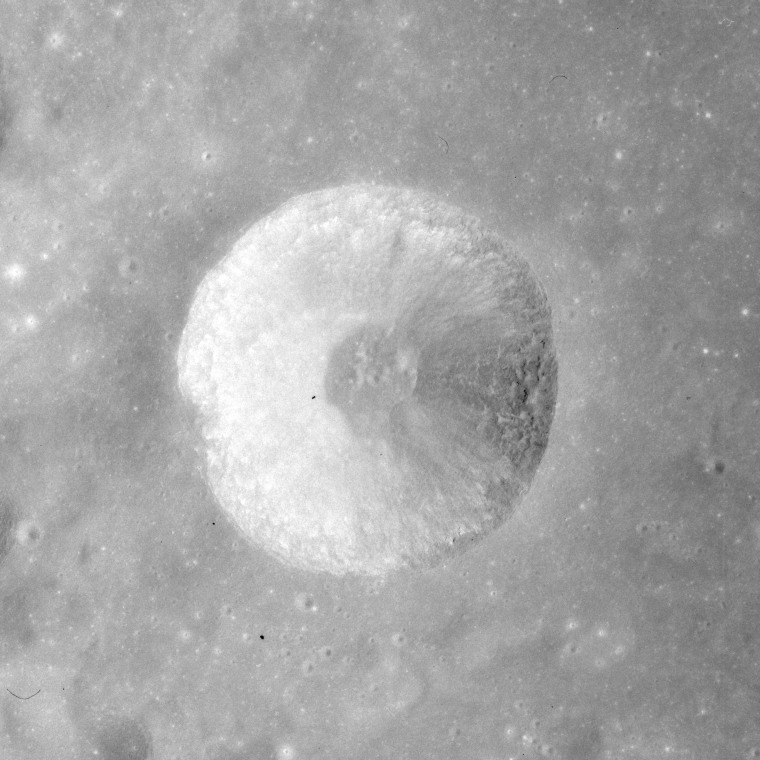
- Apollo 15 image
- Coordinates: 20.9°N 40.8°E
- Diameter: 16 km
- Depth: 3.24 km
- Colongitude: 320° at sunrise
- Eponym: George W. Hill

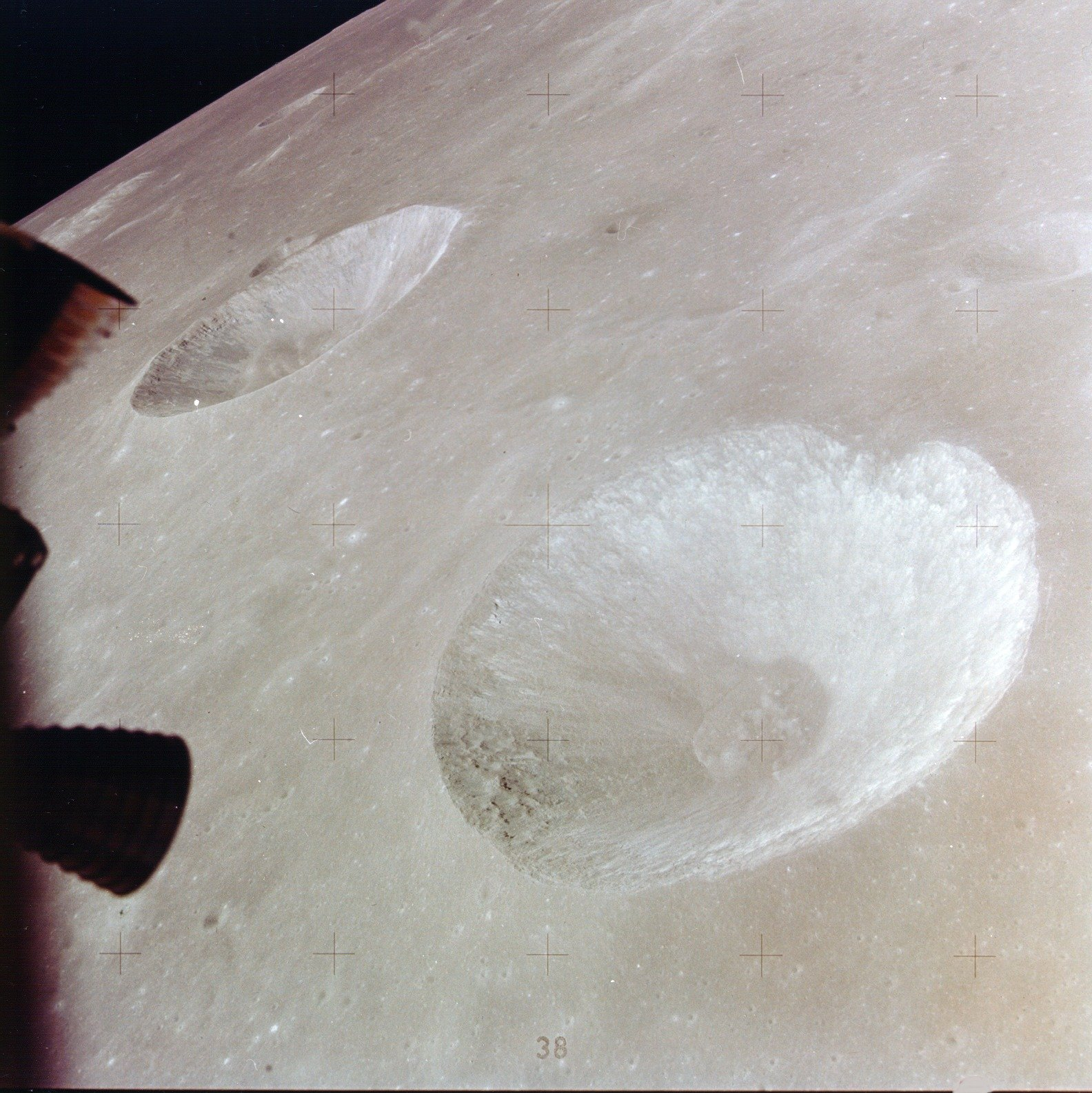
Hill crater (lower right) and Carmichael crater (upper left) from Apollo 15. NASA photo.

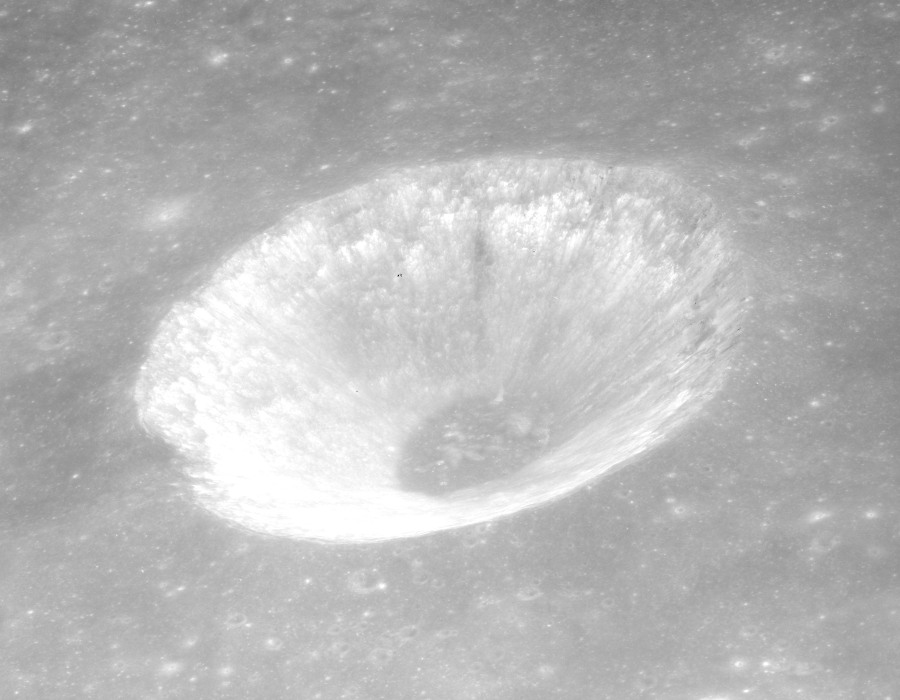
Oblique view of Hill also from Apollo 15

Hill is a small lunar impact crater that is located to the west of the prominent crater Macrobius, near the eastern edge of the Sinus Amoris. Its diameter is 16 km. It was named after American astronomer George William Hill. It was previously designated Macrobius B. It lies just to the north-northeast of Carmichael, another renamed satellite crater of Macrobius.

This is a circular, bowl-shaped crater with an inner wall that has a relatively high albedo compared to the surrounding terrain. The inner walls are symmetrical in form, and slope gently down to the small floor at the midpoint, a surface about one-fourth the diameter of the crater. This formation is not significantly eroded, and is otherwise indistinguishable from many similar craters on the Moon.

The brightness of the distinct couple Hill and Carmichael is also noticeable on the photographic version of chart LAC 43 (page 86) in The Clementine Atlas of the Moon (Bussey / Spudis).
