= Polybius (crater) =

Crater on the Moon

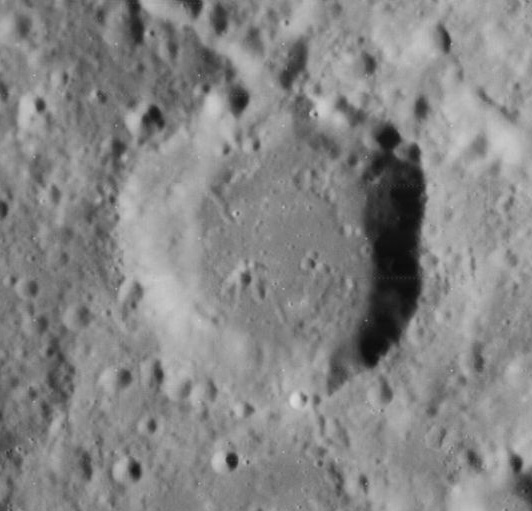
- Lunar Orbiter 4 image
- Coordinates: 22.4°S 25.6°E
- Diameter: 41 km
- Depth: 2.1 km
- Colongitude: 335° at sunrise
- Eponym: Polybius

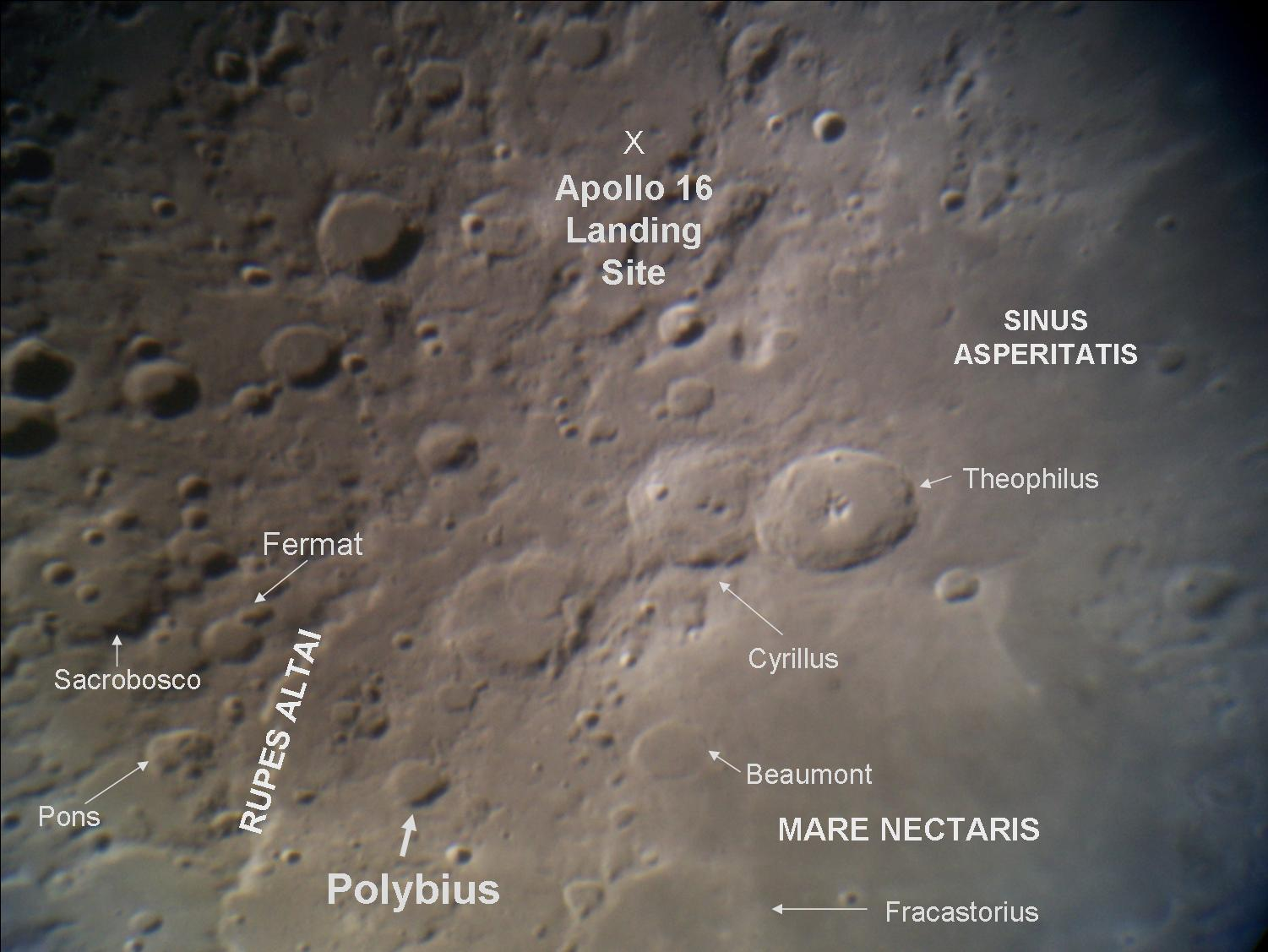
Location of Polybius

Polybius is a lunar impact crater in the southeast part of the Moon, and is named after ancient Greek historian Polybius. It is located to the south-southeast of the larger crater Catharina, in the area framed by the Rupes Altai scarp. Some distance to the northeast is the Mare Nectaris, with the flooded craters Beaumont and Fracastorius.

The crater rim of Polybius appears slightly distended in the northeast, and has a cut through the northern wall. But the wall is otherwise moderately intact with only minor erosion. The interior floor is flat and almost featureless, with no central rise. To the south and east, a ray from Tycho cuts across the bowl-shaped Polybius A and Polybius B craterlets.

== Bright crater Polybius A during full moon ==
Satellite crater Polybius A, east-southeast of Polybius, is an eye-catcher during full moon. The inner slopes and floor of this bowl-shaped crater look bright white. Although both are not related, Polybius A seems to act like a knot in the pronounced northeastern ejectaray from Tycho. The brightness of Polybius A is also noticeable on the photographic version of chart LAC 96 (page 192) in The Clementine Atlas of the Moon (Ben Bussey / Paul D. Spudis).

== Satellite craters ==
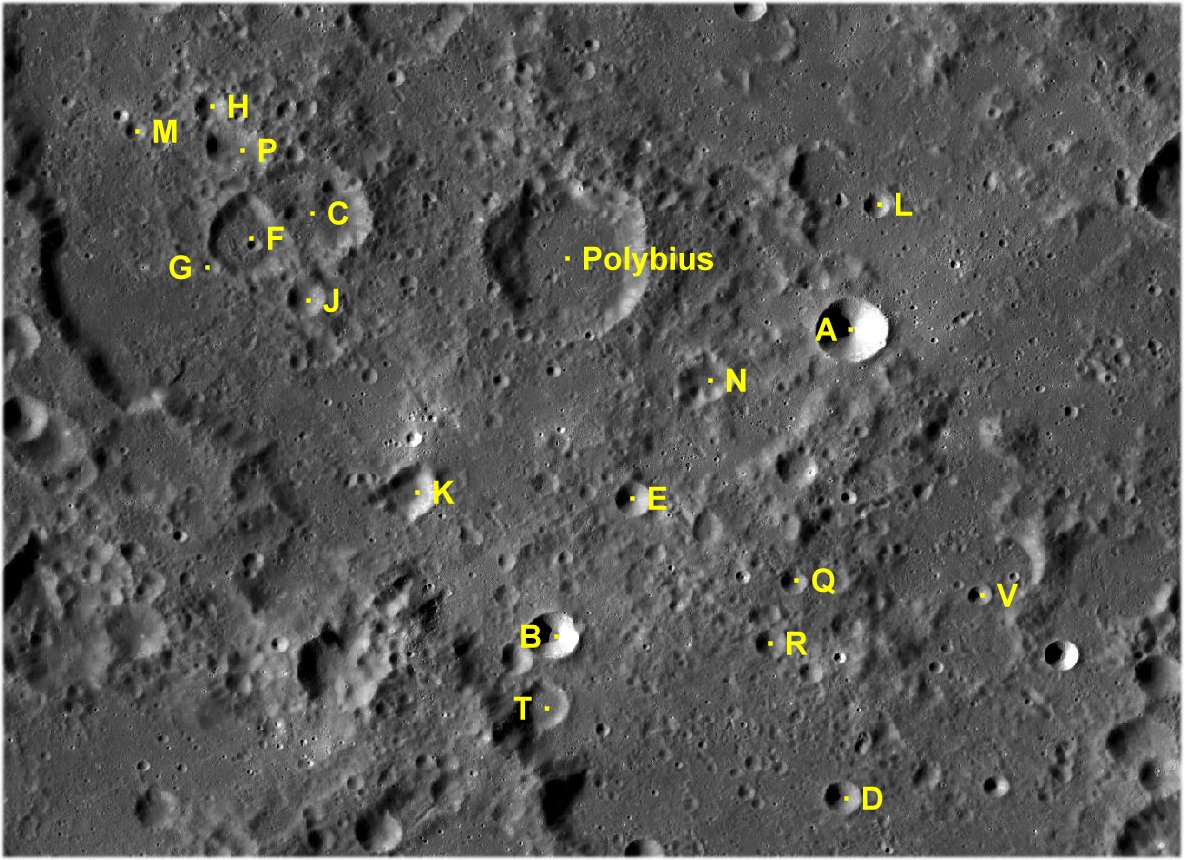
Polybius and its satellite craters

By convention these features are identified on lunar maps by placing the letter on the side of the crater midpoint that is closest to Polybius.

Polybius	Latitude	Longitude	Diameter
A	23.0° S	28.0° E	17 km
B	25.5° S	25.5° E	12 km
C	22.0° S	23.6° E	29 km
D	26.9° S	27.9° E	9 km
E	24.4° S	26.2° E	9 km
F	22.2° S	23.0° E	21 km
G	22.5° S	22.7° E	5 km
H	21.1° S	22.7° E	8 km
J	22.7° S	23.5° E	9 km
K	24.3° S	25.3° E	14 km
L	22.0° S	28.2° E	7 km
M	21.3° S	22.1° E	6 km
N	23.4° S	26.8° E	13 km
P	21.5° S	22.9° E	17 km
Q	25.1° S	27.5° E	6 km
R	25.6° S	27.3° E	7 km
T	26.1° S	25.5° E	12 km
V	25.2° S	29.1° E	6 km

Polybius K is sometimes referred to as "Larrieu’s Dam" because the unusually straight northwest rim of the crater creates the appearance of a dam under certain lighting conditions.

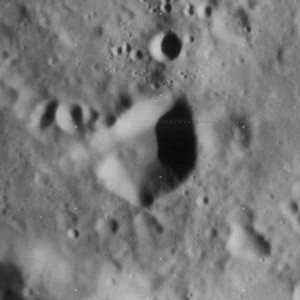
Polybius K crater
