= Mons Penck =

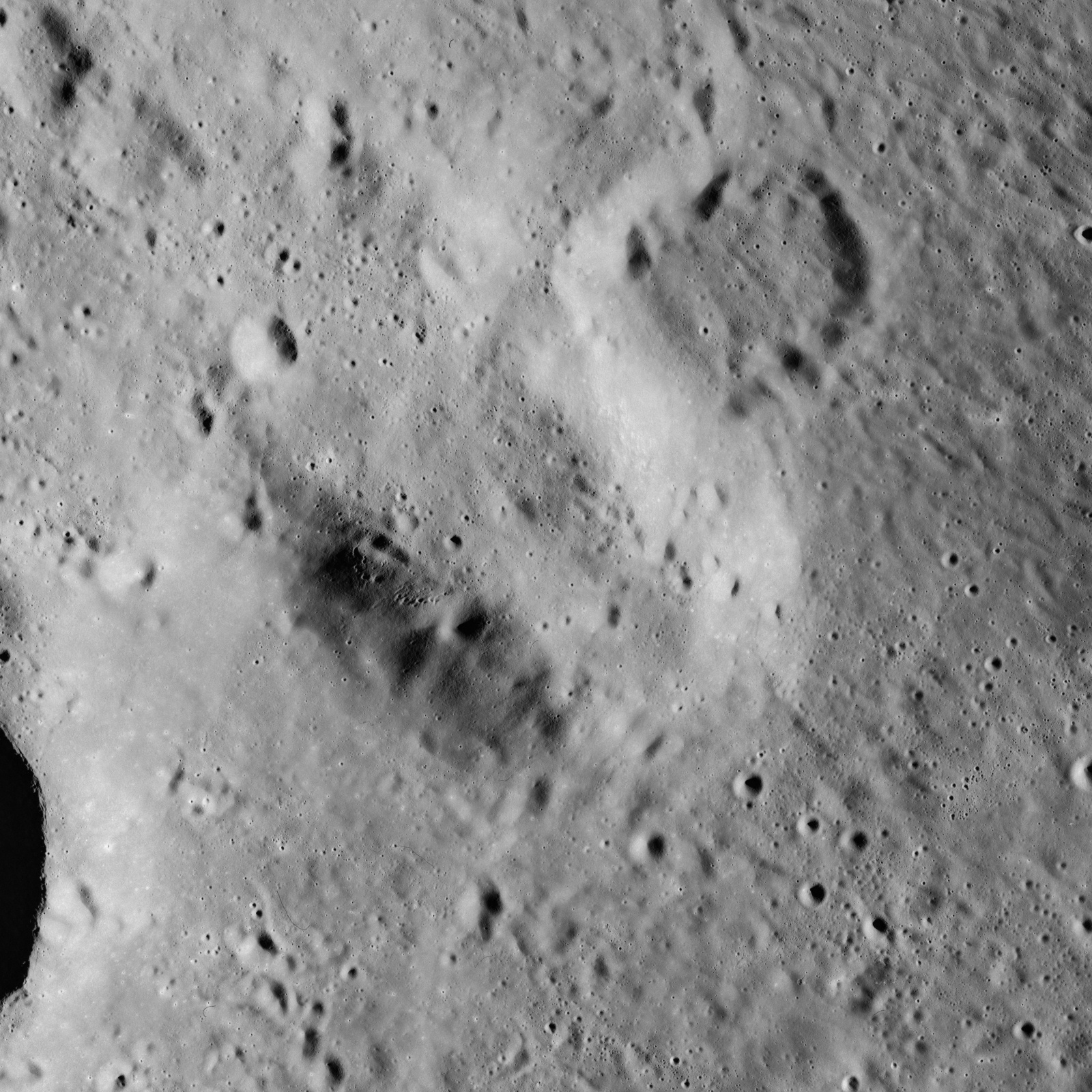
- Apollo 16 image

Highest point
- Elevation: 9890 m (summit)
- Listing: Lunar mountains
- Coordinates: 10.0°S 21.6°E

Naming
- Etymology: Named for Albrecht Penck
- English translation: Penck Mountain
- Language of name: Latin

Geography
- Location: the Moon

Mons Penck is a mountain promontory on the near side of the Moon. It lies just to the northeast of the crater Kant, to the north of Ibn-Rushd and the Rupes Altai scarp. Southeast of Mons Penck are the prominent craters Theophilus and Cyrillus.

The selenographic coordinates of this peak are 10.0° S, 21.6° E. It has a diameter of about 30 km at the base and climbs to an altitude of over 4 km (13,000 feet). It was named after Albrecht Penck (1858–1945), a German geographer and geologist.
