= Tacitus (crater) =

Crater on the Moon

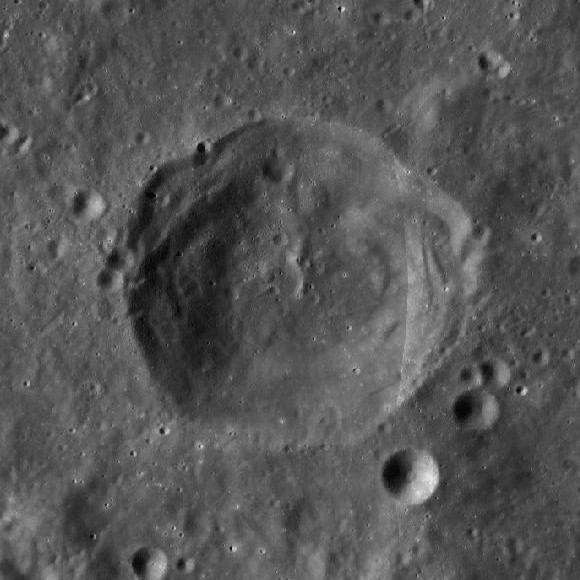
- LRO WAC mosaic
- Coordinates: 16.2°S 19.0°E
- Diameter: 40 km
- Depth: 2.8 km
- Colongitude: 340° at sunrise
- Eponym: Cornelius Tacitus

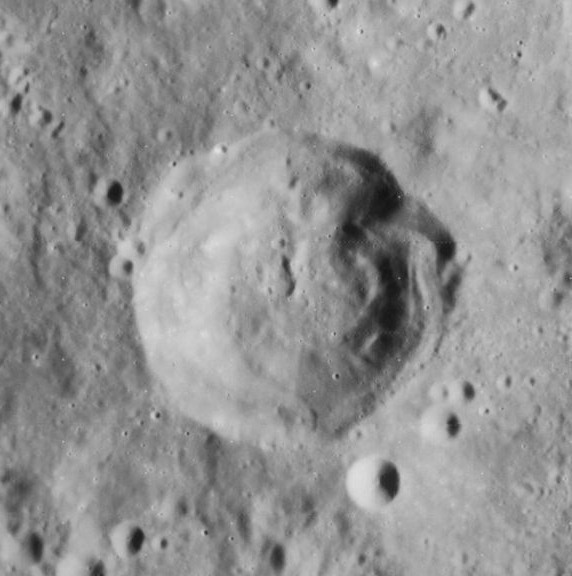
Lunar Orbiter 4 image

Tacitus is a lunar impact crater located to the northwest of the crater Catharina, at the northern extension of the Rupes Altai ridge line. It was named after the 1st century Roman historian and writer Tacitus. Directly west is the crater Almanon, and to the northeast is Cyrillus. To the southeast of Tacitus is a long chain of craters named the Catena Abulfeda. This chain runs to the northwest from the eastern edge of the Rupes Altai, continuing for over 200 kilometers.

The crater terminates a ridge which forms part of the Rupes Altai. The outer wall has a small rampart, and the interior surfaces are terraced. The rim outline has a slight polygonal outline. There is a low ridge on the crater floor running from the north wall.

== Tacitus during full moon ==
Although Tacitus is very difficult to find during full moon, the location of this crater is immediately north of an officially unnamed high albedo ray craterlet of which the eastern section of its bright ejectablanket is absent. The brightness of the western half of this craterlet's ejectablanket is also noticeable on the photographic version of chart LAC 96 (page 192) in The Clementine Atlas of the Moon (Ben Bussey / Paul D. Spudis).

== Satellite craters ==
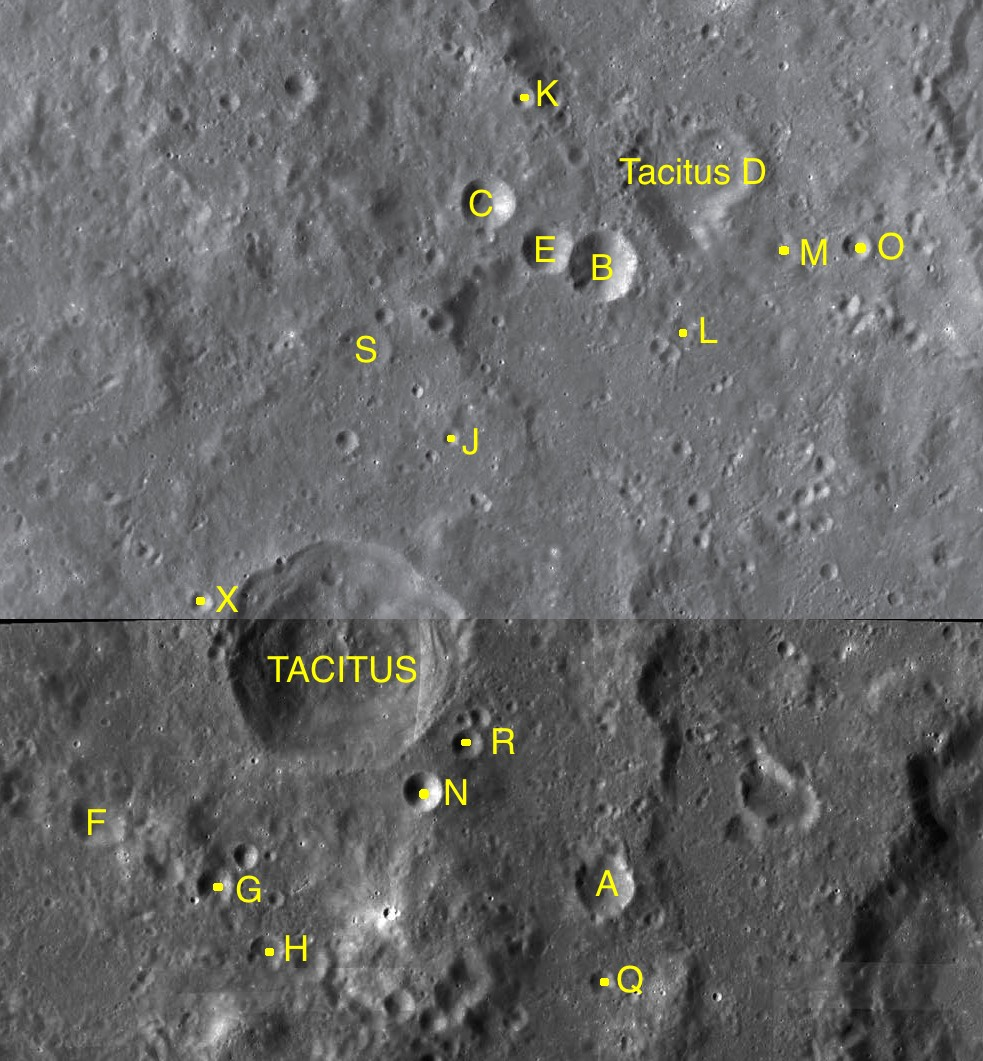
Satellite craters of Tacitus

By convention these features are identified on lunar maps by placing the letter on the side of the crater midpoint that is closest to Tacitus.

| Tacitus | Latitude | Longitude | Diameter |
|---|---|---|---|
| A | 17.4° S | 20.5° E | 11 km |
| B | 14.0° S | 20.4° E | 13 km |
| C | 13.6° S | 19.8° E | 9 km |
| D | 13.5° S | 21.0° E | 15 km |
| E | 13.9° S | 20.1° E | 9 km |
| F | 17.1° S | 17.6° E | 10 km |
| G | 17.4° S | 18.2° E | 6 km |
| H | 17.8° S | 18.5° E | 7 km |
| J | 14.9° S | 19.7° E | 3 km |
| K | 13.1° S | 20.1° E | 3 km |
| L | 14.4° S | 20.9° E | 6 km |
| M | 13.9° S | 21.5° E | 6 km |
| N | 16.9° S | 19.4° E | 7 km |
| O | 14.0° S | 21.9° E | 5 km |
| Q | 18.0° S | 20.5° E | 5 km |
| R | 16.7° S | 19.7° E | 5 km |
| S | 14.5° S | 19.1° E | 10 km |
| X | 15.8° S | 18.2° E | 4 km |
