= Taylor (crater) =

Crater on the Moon

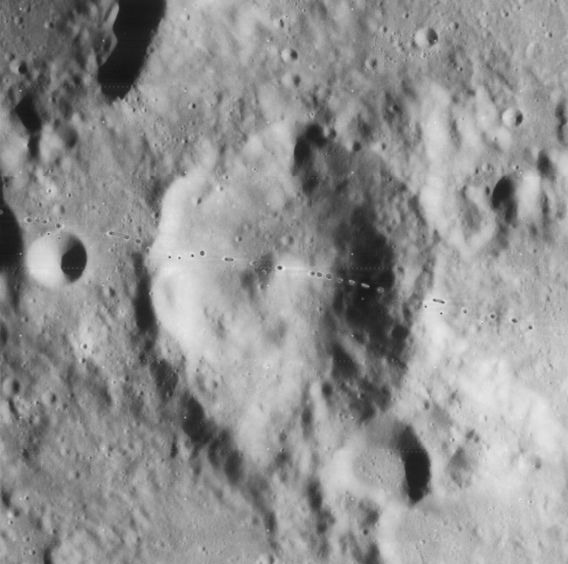
- Lunar Orbiter 4 image
- Coordinates: 5.3°S 16.7°E
- Diameter: 41 km
- Depth: 3.1 km
- Colongitude: 344° at sunrise
- Eponym: Brook Taylor

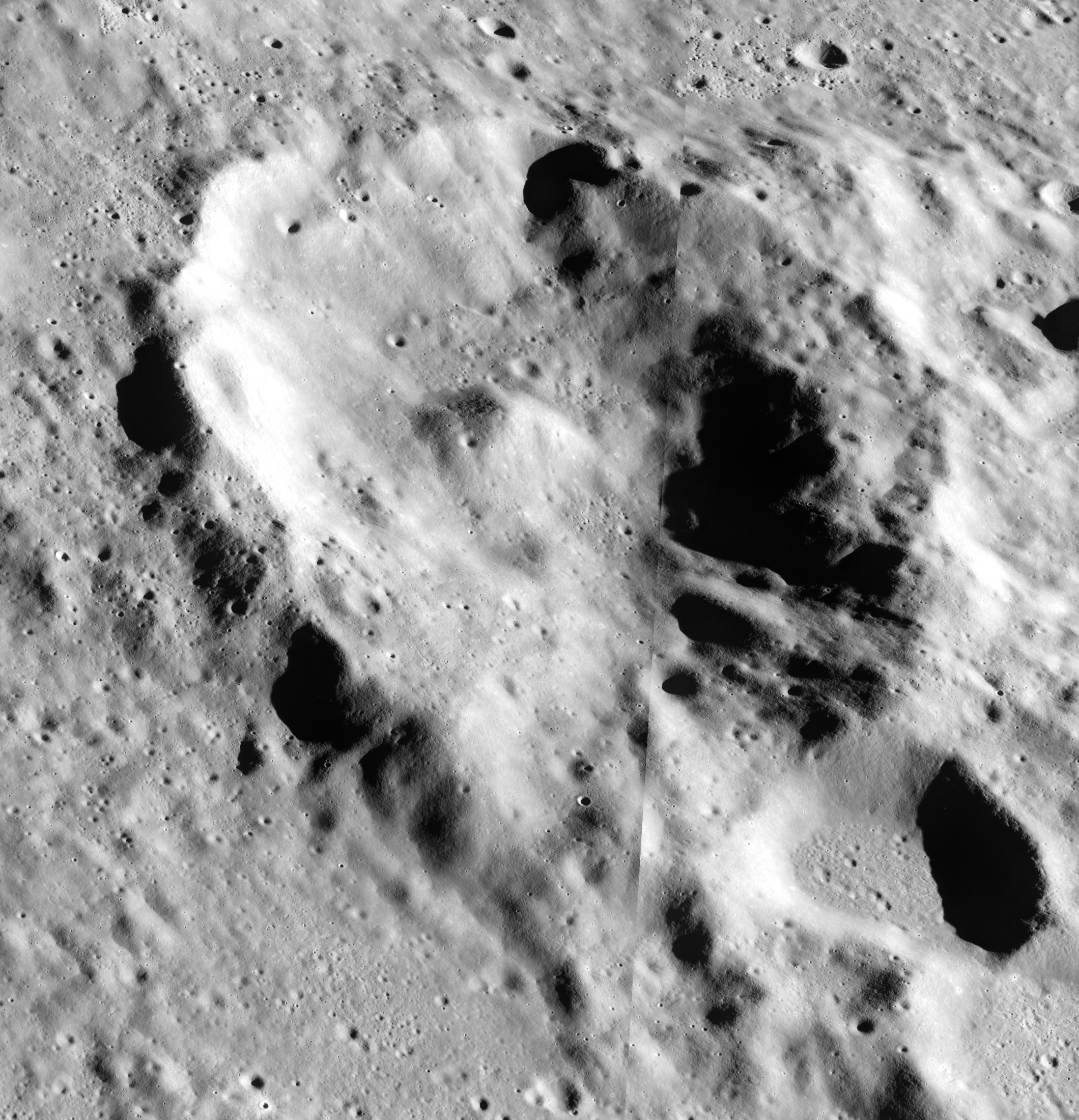
Oblique view of Taylor crater from Apollo 16

Taylor is a lunar impact crater that is located to the south-southwest of Delambre. To the east is the smaller crater Alfraganus, and southeast of Taylor is Zöllner. It was named in honour of British mathematician Brook Taylor.

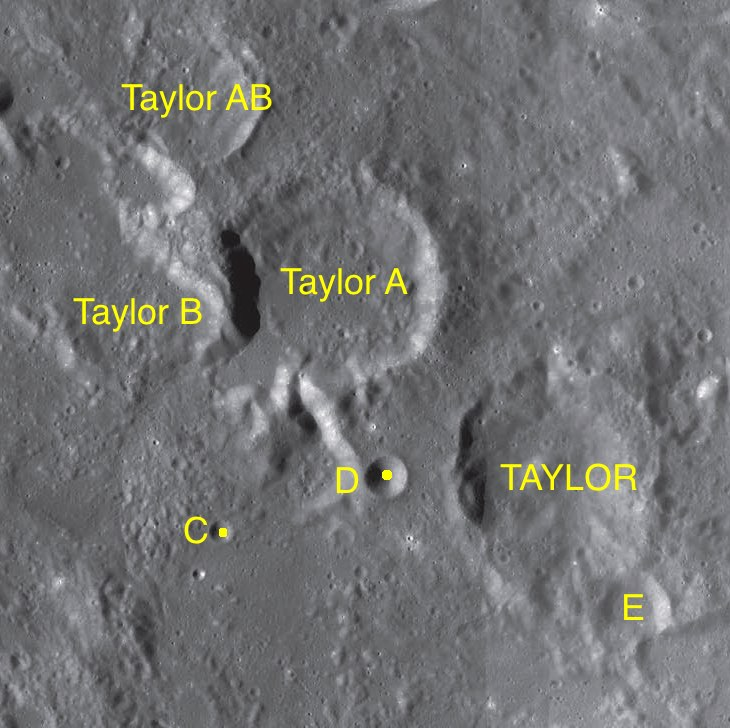
Taylor and its satellite craters

The worn outer rim of Taylor is elongated in the north–south direction, giving it an elliptical appearance. There is a break in the northern wall that forms a narrow valley, and the southern rim is relatively low compared to the peak rim heights along the eastern and western sides. The small satellite crater Taylor E is attached to the exterior of the southeastern rim. There is a central ridge at the midpoint that is slightly elongated in the north–south direction.

== Satellite craters ==
By convention these features are identified on lunar maps by placing the letter on the side of the crater midpoint that is closest to Taylor.

Taylor	Latitude	Longitude	Diameter
A	4.2° S	15.4° E	38 km
AB	3.1° S	14.6° E	23 km
B	4.3° S	14.3° E	29 km
C	5.6° S	14.8° E	5 km
D	5.3° S	15.7° E	8 km
E	6.0° S	17.1° E	14 km
