= Zöllner (crater) =

Crater on the Moon

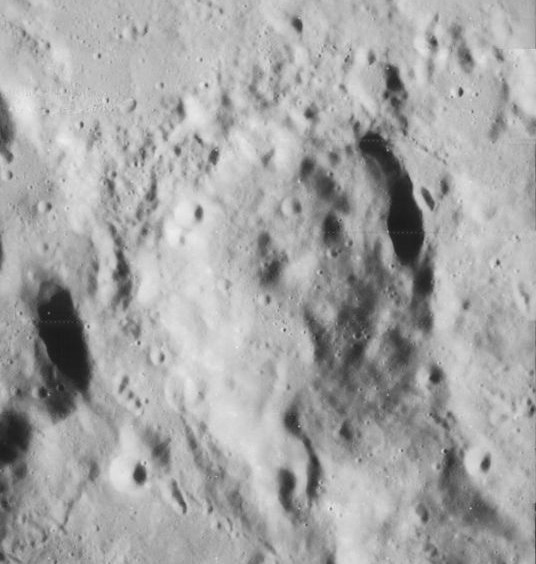
- Lunar Orbiter 4 image
- Coordinates: 8.0°S 18.9°E
- Diameter: 47 × 36 km
- Depth: 2.0 km
- Colongitude: 341° at sunrise
- Eponym: Johann K. F. Zöllner

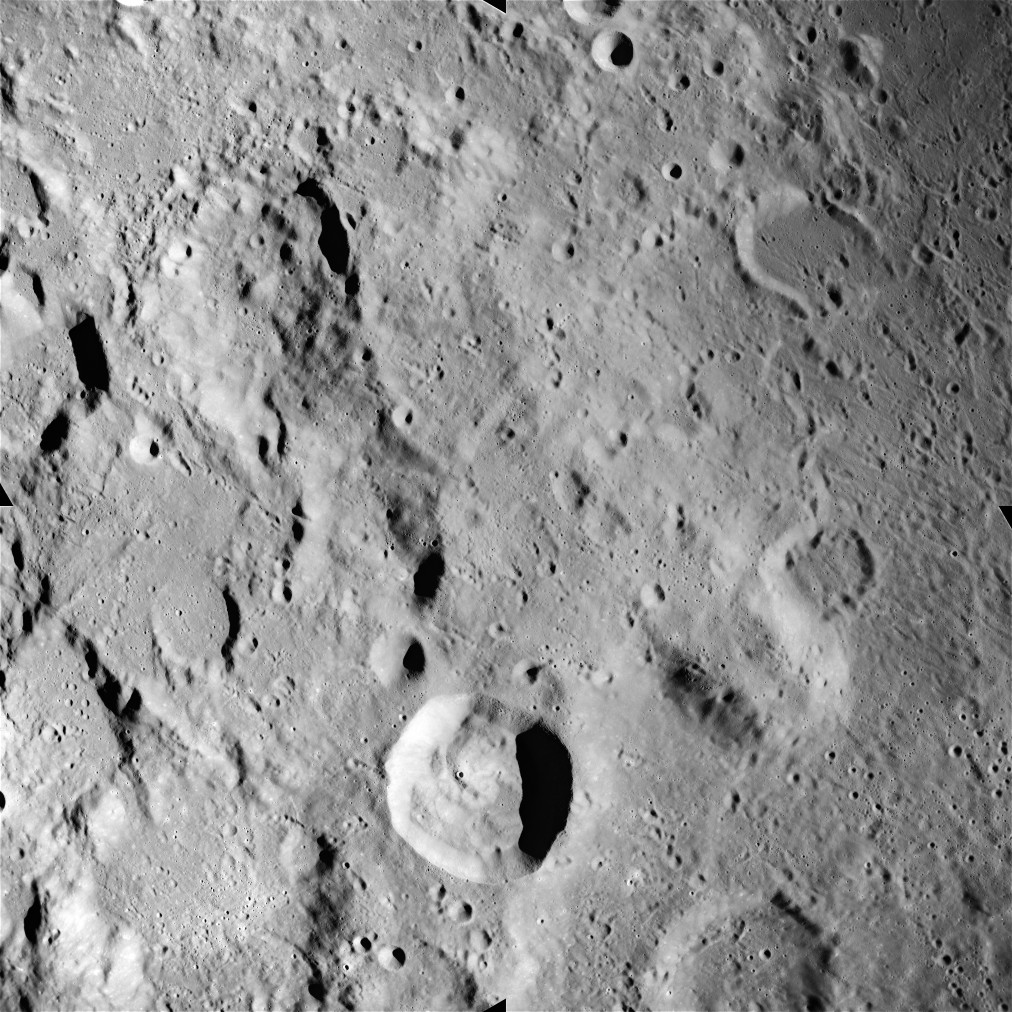
Zöllner (upper left) and Kant (bottom center) from Apollo 16. NASA photo.

Zöllner is a lunar impact crater located to the west of Sinus Asperitatis. It was named after German astrophysicist and astronomer Johann Karl Friedrich Zöllner. To the north is the smaller crater Alfraganus and to the northwest lies the oval-shaped Taylor. Southeast of Zöllner is the smaller crater Kant.

The rim of Zöllner forms an irregular oval, with the formation being longer in a north–south direction. The wall is low and worn, with a distorted, crater-like depression attached to the southeast of the rim. The narrow floor still retains a central peak.

The Apollo 16 landing site is located about 80 kilometers west-southwest of the crater rim.

== Satellite craters ==
By convention these features are identified on lunar maps by placing the letter on the side of the crater midpoint that is closest to Zöllner.

Zöllner	Latitude	Longitude	Diameter
A	7.1° S	21.5° E	7 km
D	8.3° S	17.7° E	24 km
E	8.9° S	18.3° E	6 km
F	7.5° S	21.9° E	25 km
G	7.3° S	20.8° E	10 km
H	7.1° S	19.2° E	8 km
J	6.2° S	20.7° E	11 km
K	6.5° S	20.8° E	7 km
