= Girolamo Fracastoro =

Italian physician, poet, and scholar

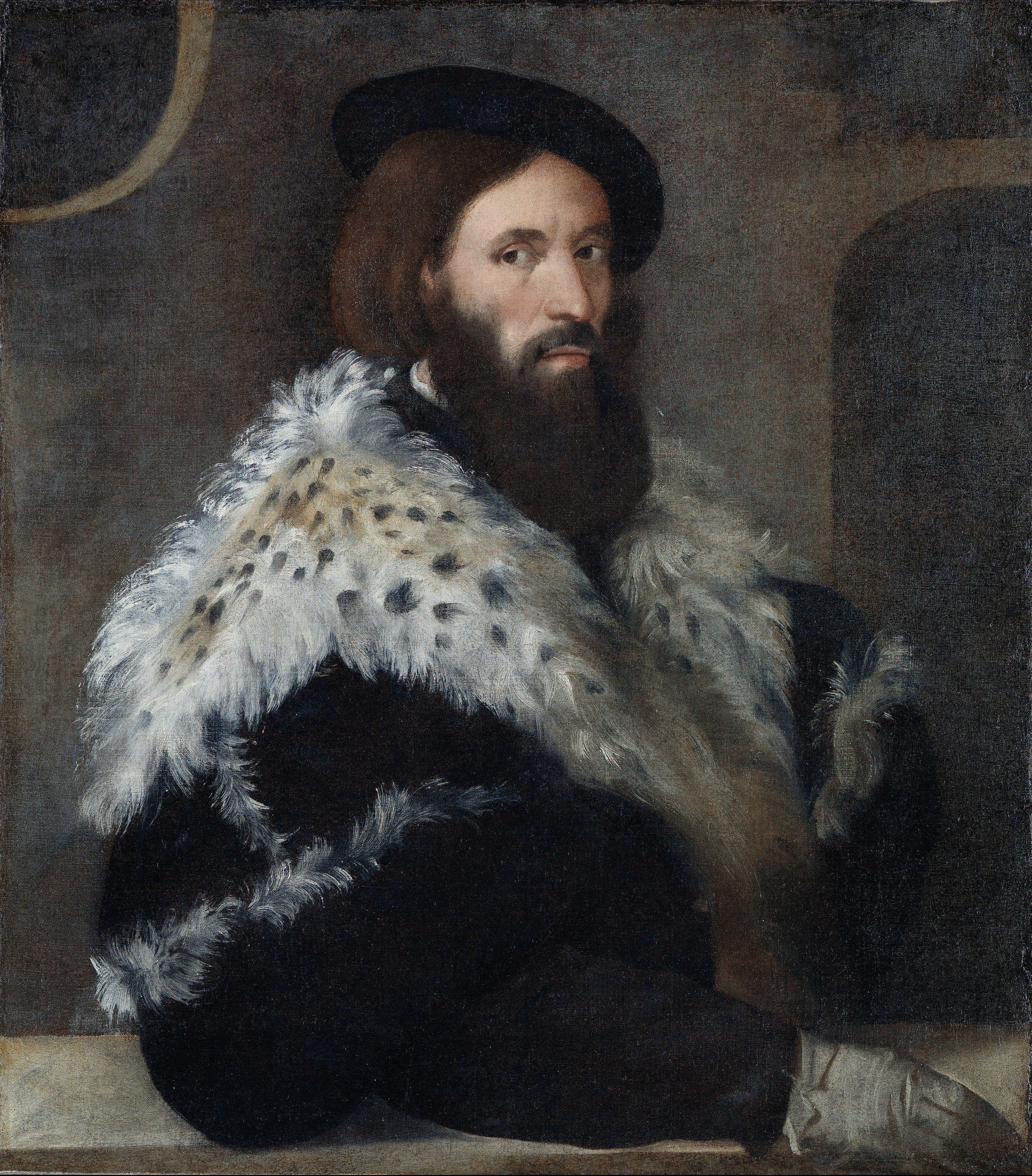
Portrait of Girolamo Fracastoro by Titian, c.1528

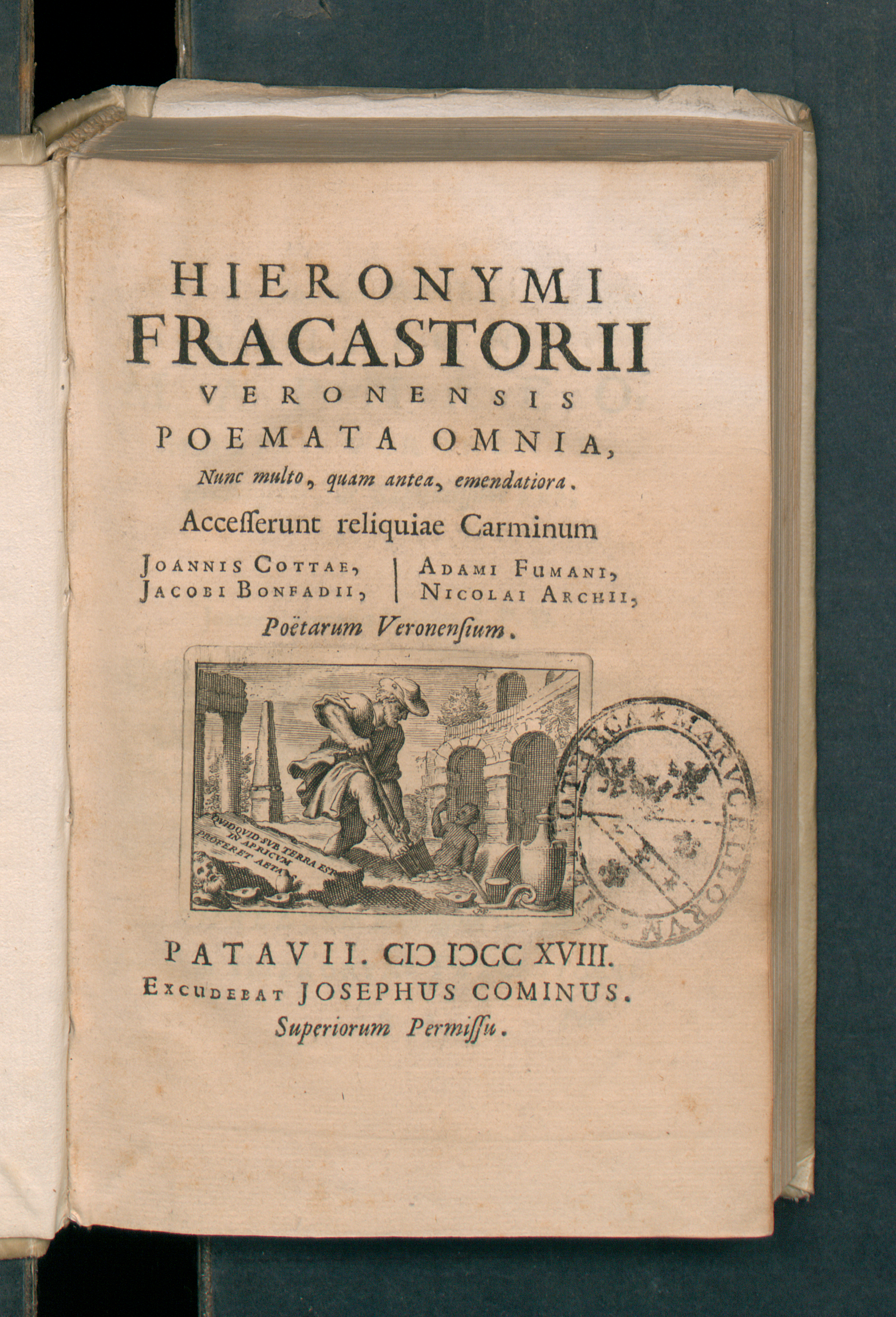
Hieronymi Fracastorii Poemata Omnia (1718)

Girolamo Fracastoro (Latin: Hieronymus Fracastorius; c. 1476/8 – 6 August 1553) was an Italian physician, poet, and scholar in mathematics, geography and astronomy. Fracastoro subscribed to the philosophy of atomism, and rejected appeals to hidden causes in scientific investigation. His studies of the mode of syphilis transmission are an early example of epidemiology.

== Life and medical career ==
Fracastoro was born in Verona, Republic of Venice, and educated at Padua where at the age of 19 he was appointed professor at the university. On account of his eminence in the practice of medicine, he was elected physician of the Council of Trent. A bronze statue was erected in his honor by the citizens of Padua, while his native city commemorated their great compatriot with a marble statue. He lived and practised in his hometown. In 1546 he proposed that epidemic diseases are caused by transferable tiny particles or "spores" that could transmit infection by direct contact, indirect contact, or even without contact over long distances. In his writing, the "spores" of diseases may refer to chemicals rather than to any living entities.

He appears to have first used the Latin word fomes, meaning tinder, in the sense of infectious agent, in his essay on contagion De Contagione et Contagiosis Morbis (On Contagion and Contagious Diseases), published in 1546: "I call fomites [from the Latin fomes, meaning "tinder"] such things as clothes, linen, etc., which although not themselves corrupt, can nevertheless foster the essential seeds of the contagion and thus cause infection." His theory remained influential for nearly three centuries. 19th century bacteriologists studied Fracastoro’s works, and his "seeds of disease" theory is considered as a predecessor to germ theory.

In the same work he also wrote extensively on rabies, speculating that it might be transmitted by rabid dog saliva penetrating the skin.

The name for syphilis is derived from Fracastoro's 1530 epic poem in three books, Syphilis sive morbus gallicus ("Syphilis or The French Disease"), about a shepherd boy named Syphilus who tended the flocks of King Alcinous. Syphilus insulted Sol Pater, the god of the Sun, and was punished by him with a horrible disease. The poem suggests using mercury and "guaiaco" as a cure. In 1546 his book (De contagione, "On Contagion") also gave the first description of typhus. The collected works of Fracastoro appeared for the first time in 1555.

Alongside Syphilis, Fracastoro wrote a Biblical epic in two books, Joseph, and a collection of miscellaneous poems, Carmina. Joseph was translated under the title The Maidens Blush, or Joseph by Josuah Sylvester. A full edition and English translation of Fracastoro's poetry was prepared by James Gardner for The I Tatti Renaissance Library.

The bust of Girolamo Fracastoro

In 1546 Fracastoro described an epidemic in cattle that devastated farmers near Verona, Italy. That disease is now recognized as foot-and-mouth disease (FMD), an animal illness of great antiquity.

== Other pursuits ==
=== Geology and fossils ===
The following is a discussion of the role of Fracastoro in contemporaneous debates about the origin and nature of marine fossils discovered in excavations in Verona during 1517, as quoted from Charles Lyell's Principles of Geology:

It was not till the earlier part of the sixteenth century that geological phenomena began to attract the attention of the Christian nations. At that period a very animated controversy sprung up in Italy, concerning the true nature and origin of marine shells, and other organized fossils found abundantly in the strata of the peninsula. The excavations made in 1517, for repairing the city of Verona, brought to light a multitude of curious petrifactions, and furnished matter for speculation to different authors, and among the rest to Fracastoro, who declared his opinion, that fossil shells had all belonged to living animals, which had formerly lived and multiplied, where their exuviæ are now found. He exposed the absurdity of having recourse to a certain 'plastic force,' which it was said had the power to fashion stones into organic forms; and, with no less cogent arguments, demonstrated the futility of attributing the situation of the shells in question to the Mosaic deluge, a theory obstinately defended by some. That inundation, he observed, was too transient, it consisted principally of fluviatile waters; and if it had transported shells to great distances, must have strewed them over the surface, not buried them at vast depths in the interior of mountains. His clear exposition of the evidence would have terminated the discussion forever, if the passions of mankind had not been enlisted in the dispute; and even though doubts should for a time have remained in some minds, they would speedily have been removed by the fresh information obtained almost immediately afterwards, respecting the structure of fossil remains, and of their living analogues. The clear and philosophical views of Fracastoro were disregarded, and the talent and argumentative powers of the learned were doomed for three centuries to be wasted in the discussion of these two simple and preliminary questions: first, whether fossil remains had ever belonged to living creatures; and secondly, whether, if this be admitted, all the phenomena could be explained by the Noachian deluge.

=== Homocentric spheres ===
Fracastoro further developed Eudoxus' Astronomical model of homocentric or concentric spheres in an attempt to bring it back to the scientific sphere. It was criticised by Christopher Clavius, since homocentric spheres could not account for the change in brightness of the planets over the course of a year.

== Legacy ==
A marble portrait statue of Girolamo Fracastoro by the Carrarese sculptor Danese Cattaneo (completed 1559) stands on an arch in the central Piazza dei Signori of Verona, near the monument to Dante Alighieri. On its base is the inscription: "HIER FRACASTORIO \ PAULLI PHILIPPI F \ EX PUBLICA AUCTORITATE \ DICATA \ AN SAL MDLIX". According to a popular legend the stone ball Fracastoro holds in his right hand, symbolizing the world, will fall on the first honorable person to walk under the arch. Over the centuries many people have passed every day under the arch, but the ball remains in place.

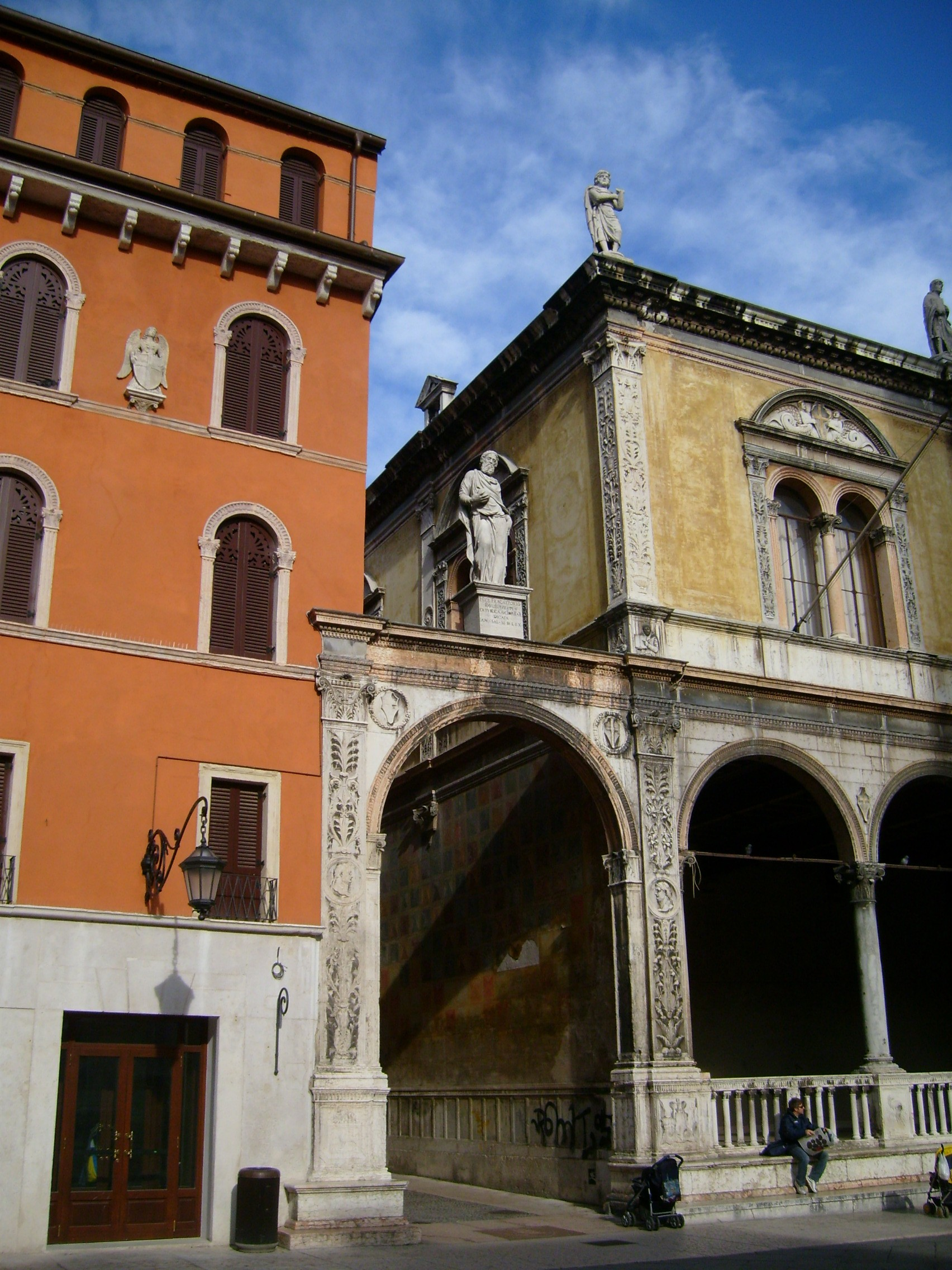
The statue in its context

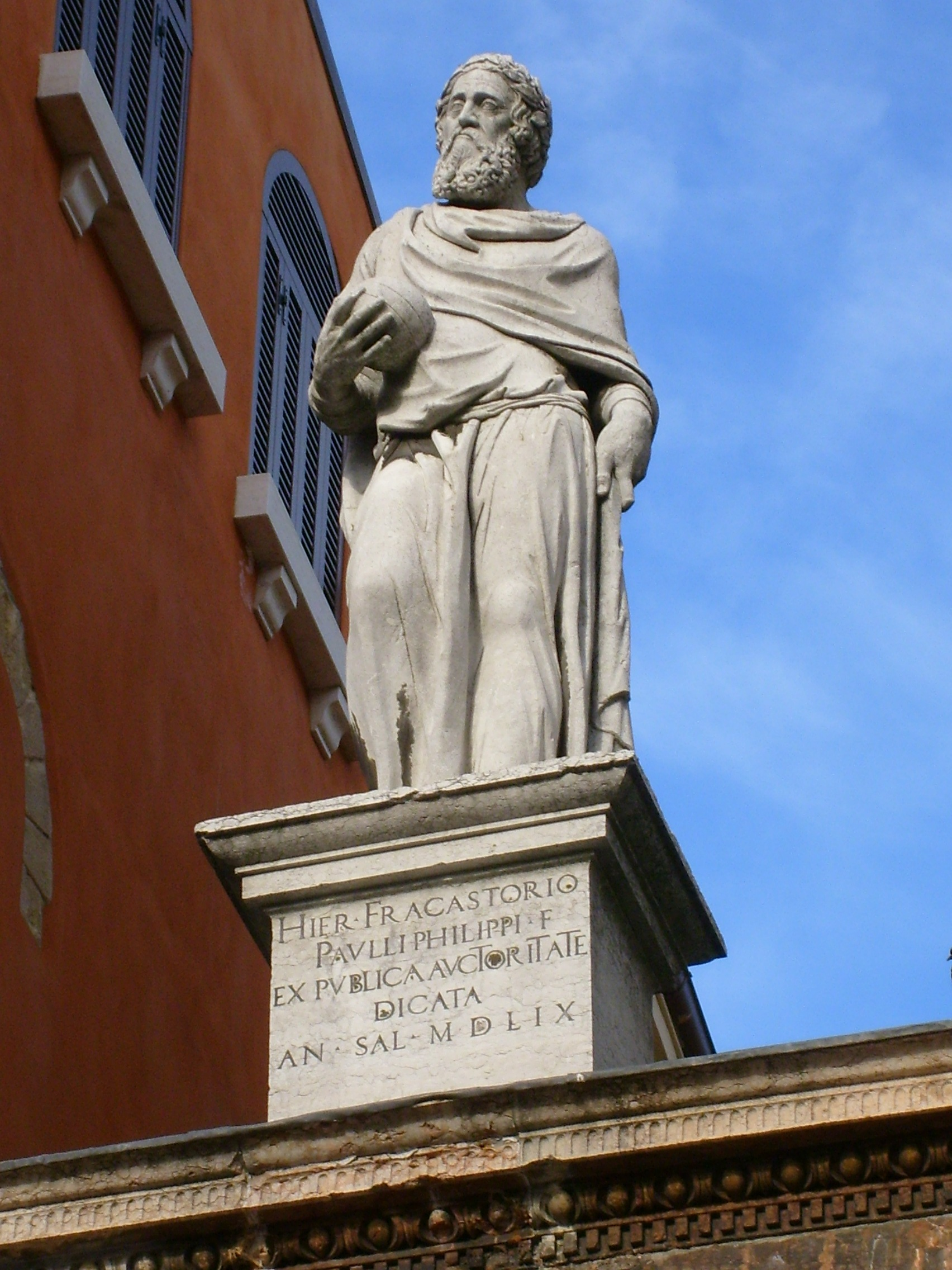
The statue with the inscription

A portrait of Fracastoro that has been in the collection of the National Gallery since 1924 has been attributed to the renowned Italian painter Titian. The re-attribution has led scholars to speculate that Titian may have painted the portrait in exchange for syphilis treatment.

The lunar crater Fracastorius is named after him.

== Works ==
- Syphilis, sive de morbo Gallico (1530)
- Di Vino Temperatura (1534)
- Homocentricorum sive de Stellis, de Causis Criticorum Dierum Libellus (1535)
- Homocentrica (1538)
- Naugerius sive de Poetica Dialogus (c. 1540)
- De Contagione et Contagiosis Morbis (1546)
- Syphilis sive de morbo gallico (1539, poem)
