= Kant (crater) =

Lunar impact crater

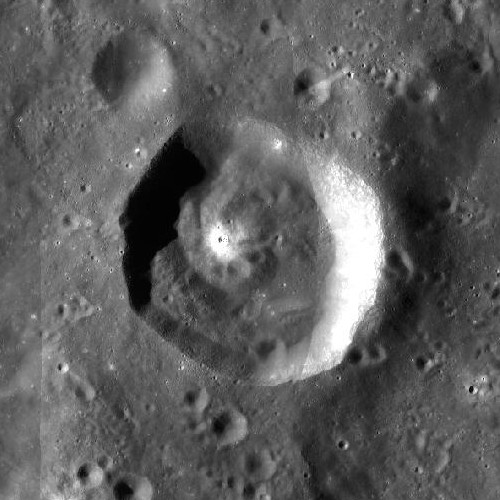
- LRO WAC mosaic
- Coordinates: 10.6°S 20.1°E
- Diameter: 32 km
- Depth: 3.72 km
- Colongitude: 40° at sunrise
- Eponym: Immanuel Kant

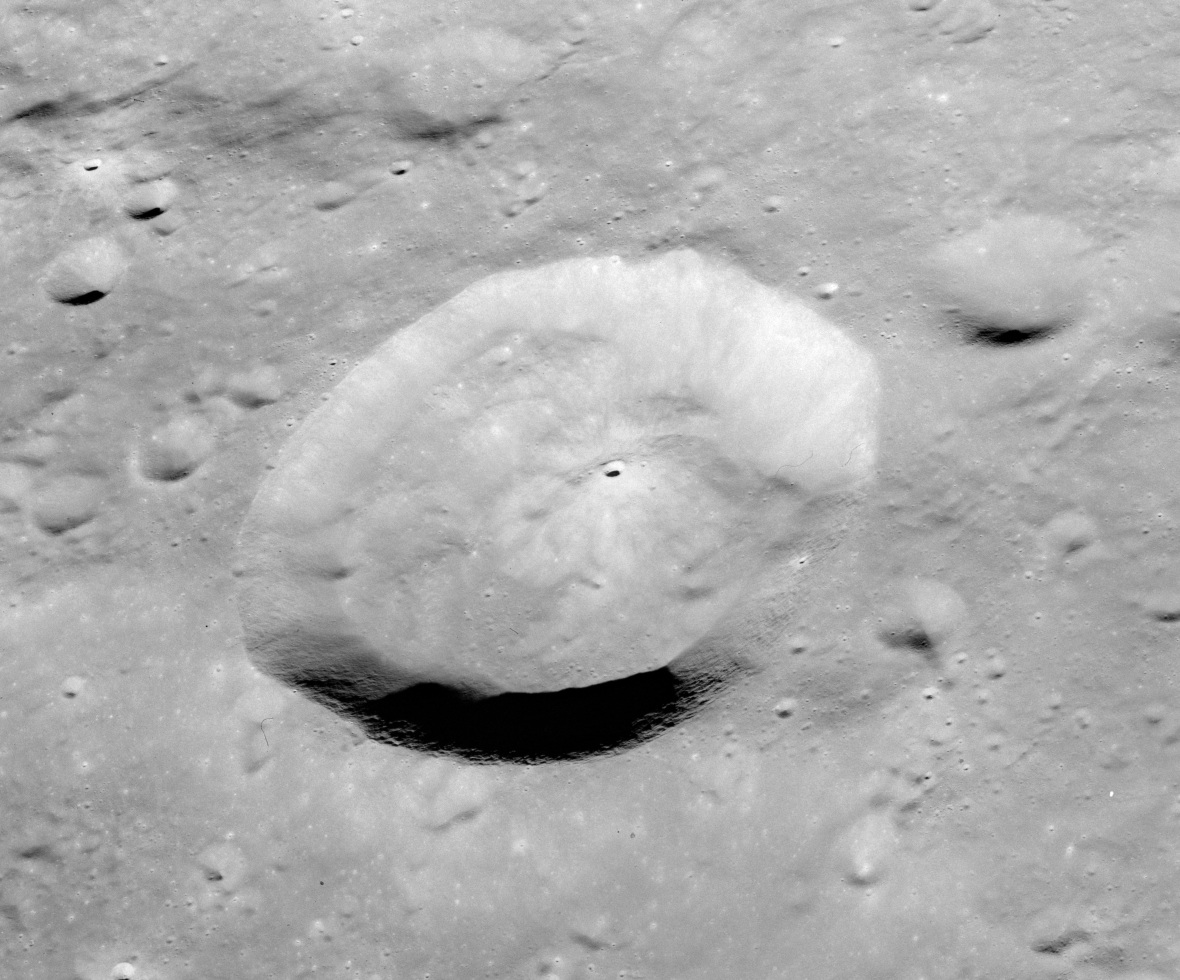
Oblique Apollo 16 image, facing west

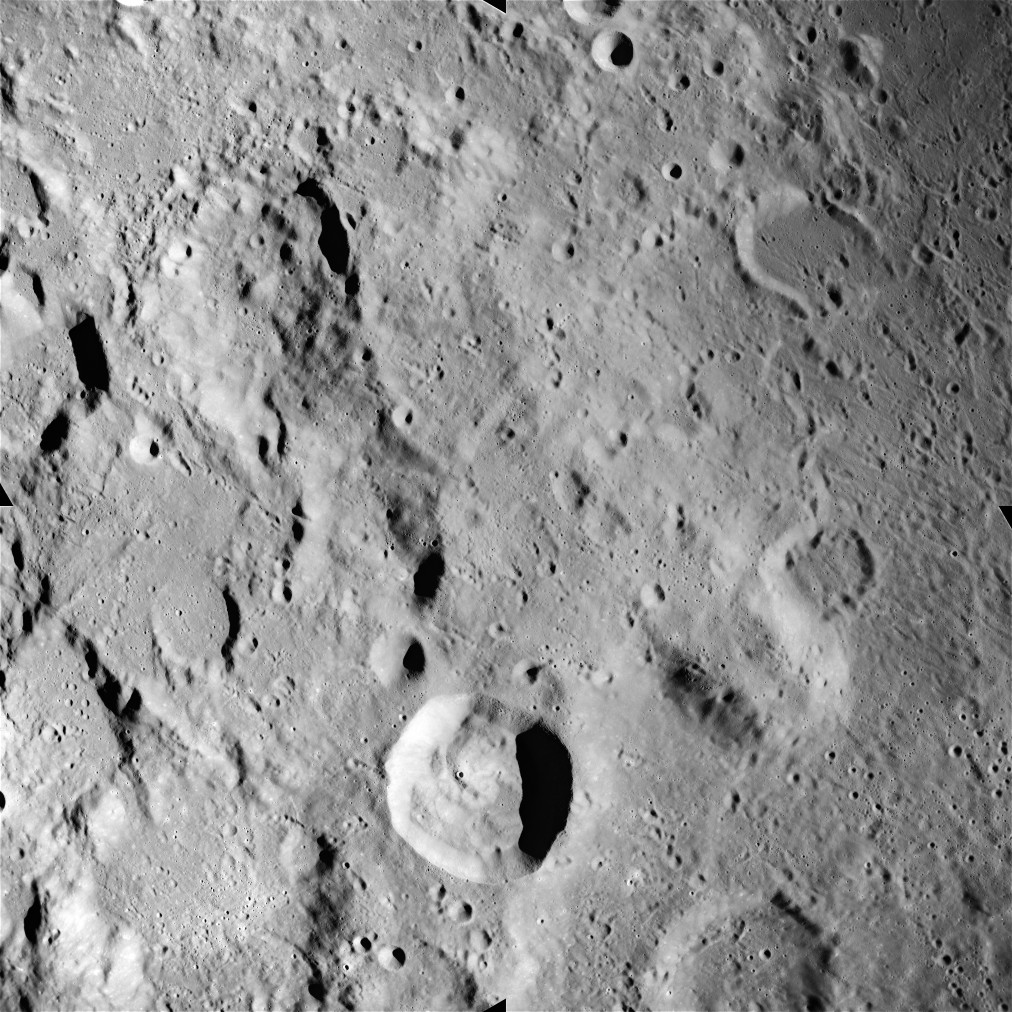
Kant (lower center) and Zöllner (upper left) from Apollo 16. Mons Penck is also visible to the right, below center. NASA photo.

Kant is a small lunar impact crater that is located to the northwest of the prominent crater Cyrillus and the comparably sized Ibn Rushd. To the northwest is Zöllner, and to the east is Mons Penck. This last feature forms a mountainous promontory reaching a height of about 4 km. The crater is named after the German philosopher Immanuel Kant.

This crater has a well-defined and somewhat uneven rim that is roughly circular in shape. The inner walls have a higher albedo than the surrounding surface, giving them a lighter appearance. Parts of the inner wall have slumped across the inner floor, producing an irregular surface.

At the midpoint of the interior is a low central rise, with a craterlet at the summit, giving the appearance of terrestrial volcano, although the peak is probably not volcanic. Anorthosite with a very low mafic abundance has been detected in this rise. The infrared spectrum of pure crystalline plagioclase has been identified on the central floor and the north wall.

== Transient lunar phenomenon in Kant ==
During observations on januari 4th, 1873, a transient lunar phenomenon was reported by Étienne Léopold Trouvelot who stated that crater Kant was 'filled with mist'

== Kant during full moon ==
Telescopic observers of the full moon, looking for Kant, know its appearance as a bright ring with central bright starlike dot, which shows itself slightly off centre to the west. The bright dot is a tiny impact craterlet on the central peak of Kant. The brightness of Kant's ring and the internal bright starlike dot are also noticeable on the photographic version of chart LAC 78 (page 156) in The Clementine Atlas of the Moon (Ben Bussey / Paul D. Spudis).

== Satellite craters ==
By convention these features are identified on lunar maps by placing the letter on the side of the crater midpoint that is closest to Kant.

Kant	Latitude	Longitude	Diameter
B	9.7° S	18.6° E	16 km
C	9.3° S	22.1° E	20 km
D	11.5° S	18.7° E	52 km
G	9.2° S	19.5° E	32 km
H	9.1° S	20.8° E	7 km
N	9.9° S	19.7° E	10 km
O	12.0° S	17.2° E	7 km
P	10.8° S	17.4° E	5 km
Q	13.1° S	18.8° E	5 km
S	11.5° S	19.7° E	5 km
T	11.3° S	20.2° E	5 km
Z	10.4° S	17.5° E	3 km
