= Ibn-Rushd (crater) =

Crater on the Moon

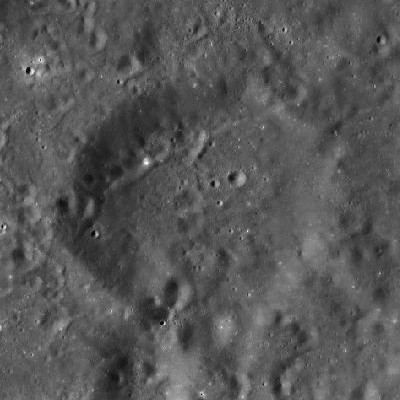
- LRO WAC mosaic
- Coordinates: 11.7°S 21.7°E
- Diameter: 33 km
- Colongitude: 339° at sunrise
- Eponym: Ibn Rushd

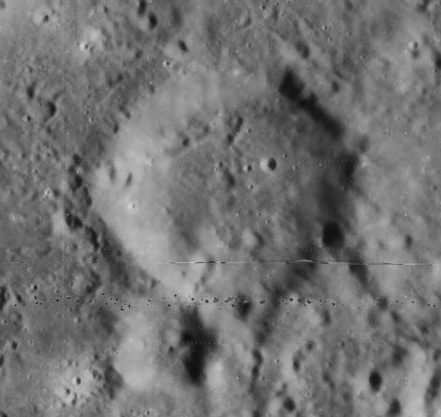
Lunar Orbiter 4 image

Ibn-Rushd is a lunar impact crater located to the northwest of the larger crater Cyrillus. To the northwest is the crater Kant and to the north is Mons Penck, a mountain promontory. The crater is somewhat eroded with age, and the southern rim is overlain by a pair of smaller craters named Cyrillus B and C. The crater floor is relatively flat, and lacks a central peak. In 1976 the crater was named after Ibn Rushd (Latinized as Averroes), the 12th-century Muslim polymath from the Islamic Spain, whose many scientific accomplishments included analysis of the lunar surface. Prior to that, it was identified as Cyrillus B.
