= Catharina (crater) =

Crater on the Moon

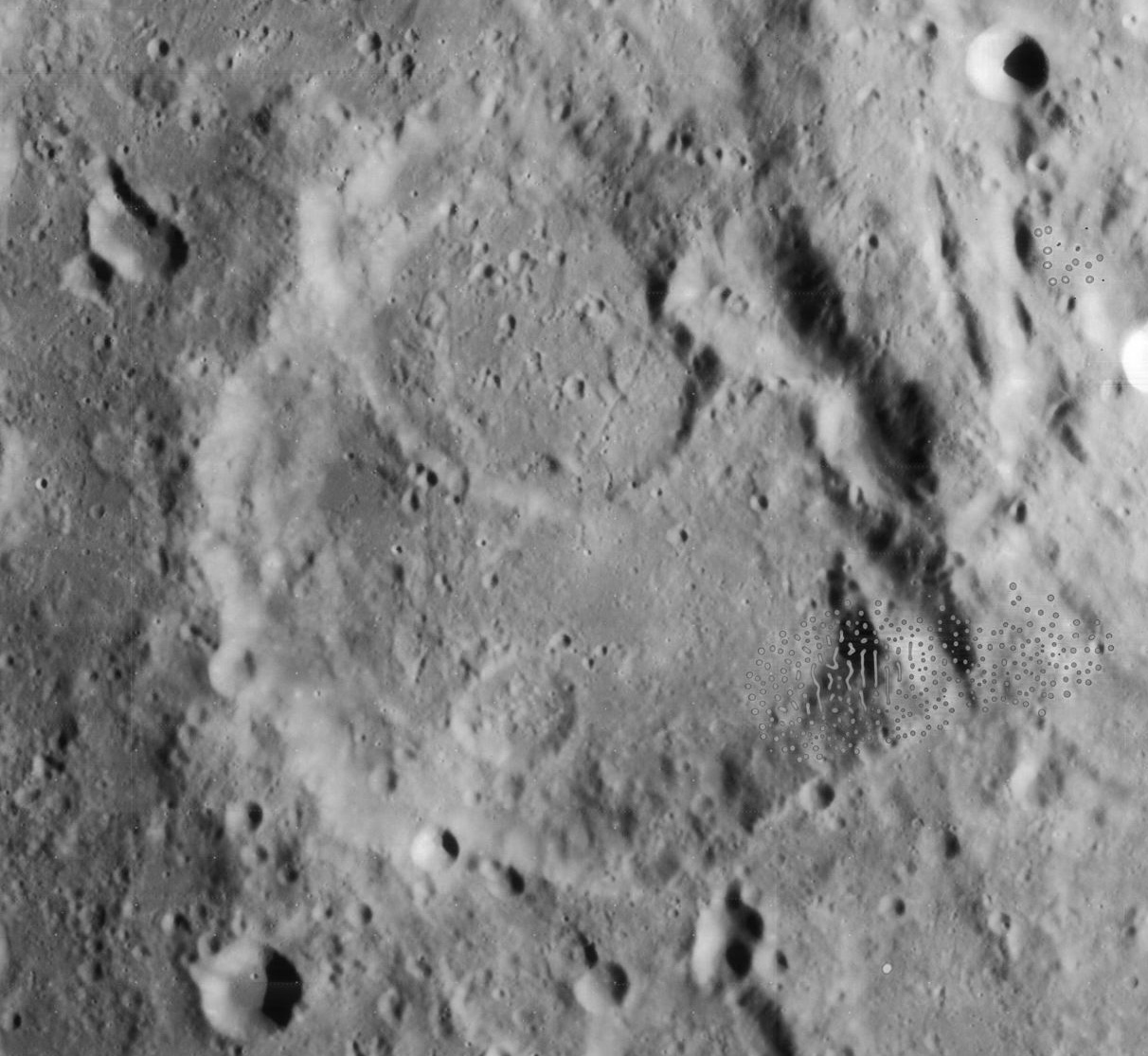
- Lunar Orbiter 4 image
- Coordinates: 18.0°S 23.6°E
- Diameter: 98.77 km (61.37 mi)
- Depth: 3.1 km (1.9 mi)
- Colongitude: 337° at sunrise
- Eponym: Saint Catherine of Alexandria

Catharina is an ancient lunar impact crater located in the southern highlands. British astronomer T. W. Webb calls it "irregular in character". It lies in a rugged stretch of land between the Rupes Altai scarp to the west and Mare Nectaris in the east. To the west-northwest is the crater Tacitus, and the lava-flooded Beaumont lies to the east along the shore of Mare Nectaris. To the south-southeast is Polybius.

With the large craters Cyrillus and Theophilus in the north, Catharina forms a prominent grouping that is framed by the curve of the Rupes Altai, with Catharina being the largest of the three. Together they form a notable feature when the Sun is at a low angle to the surface. There is a distinct difference in the ages of these three craters, with the age increasing significantly from north to south.

The rim of Catharina is heavily worn and irregular, with most of the north wall incised by the low walled, ruined ring of crater Catharina P. The northeast wall is deeply impacted by several smaller craters. No terracing remains on the inner wall, and the outer rampart has been nearly eroded away. The floor is relatively flat but rugged, with a curved ridge formed by Catharina P, and the remains of a smaller crater near the south wall. Nothing remains of a central peak.

Crater data from the Moon Mineralogy Mapper indicates that the percent of FeO by weight varies from 0.02–18.2, with an average wt% of 9.34. TiO_{2} wt% varies from 0.2934–13.987, with an average wt% of 2.56.

This crater is named after the Eygpytian princess and scholar, Saint Catherine of Alexandria (unkn-c. 307). Her name was added to the lunar nomenclature by Italian astronomer Giovanni B. Riccioli in 1651. Its designation was officially adopted by the International Astronomical Union in 1935.

== Satellite craters ==
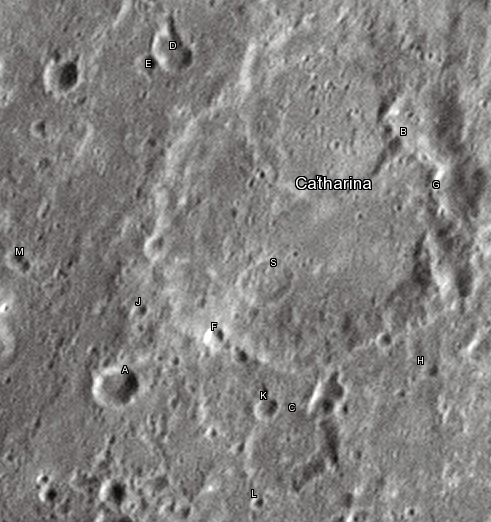
Satellite features

By convention these features are identified on lunar maps by placing the letter on the side of the crater midpoint that is closest to Catharina.

Catharina	Latitude	Longitude	Diameter
A	20.2° S	22.3° E	14 km
B	17.0° S	24.3° E	24 km
C	20.3° S	24.4° E	28 km
D	16.8° S	21.4° E	9 km
E	17.1° S	21.3° E	7 km
F	19.5° S	23.1° E	7 km
G	17.4° S	24.9° E	17 km
H	19.2° S	25.4° E	6 km
J	19.4° S	22.2° E	6 km
K	20.0° S	23.9° E	7 km
L	21.0° S	24.3° E	5 km
M	19.2° S	20.7° E	6 km
P	17.2° S	23.3° E	46 km
S	18.8° S	23.3° E	16 km

== Popular culture ==
Within the Sega CD RPG Lunar: The Silver Star (and all subsequent remakes) there is a region called the Katarina Zone, which is named after the Catharina crater.
