= Rosse (crater) =

Crater on the Moon

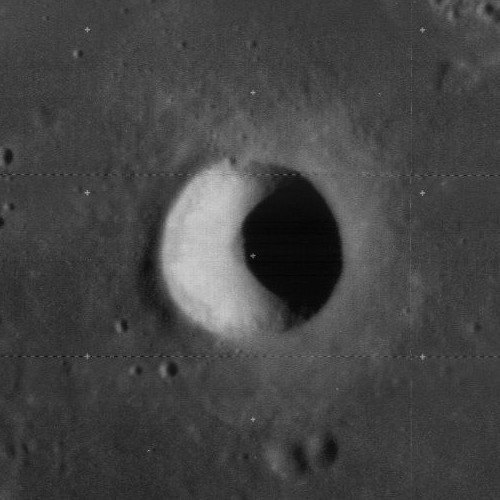
- Lunar Orbiter 4 image
- Coordinates: 17.9°S 35.0°E
- Diameter: 12 km
- Depth: 2.42 km
- Colongitude: 326° at sunrise
- Eponym: Lord Rosse

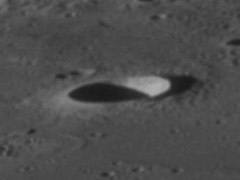
Oblique view from Apollo 11

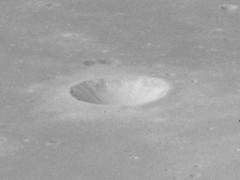
Oblique view from Apollo 16

Rosse is a bowl-shaped lunar impact crater located in the southern part of Mare Nectaris. It was named after Irish astronomer Lord Rosse. To the southwest is the large, flooded crater Fracastorius.

The interior of the crater has a higher albedo than the surrounding lunar mare, making it readily visible. While it lacks a ray system of its own, rays from distant Tycho cross it. Low ridges in the mare lie between this crater and Fracastorius to the southwest.

== Satellite craters ==
By convention these features are identified on lunar maps by placing the letter on the side of the crater midpoint that is closest to Rosse.

Rosse	Latitude	Longitude	Diameter
C	18.5° S	34.4° E	5 km
