= Al-Farghani =

Abbasid astronomer (c. 800 – 870)

Al-Farghānī
- أبو العبّاس أحمد بن محمد بن كثير الفرغاني
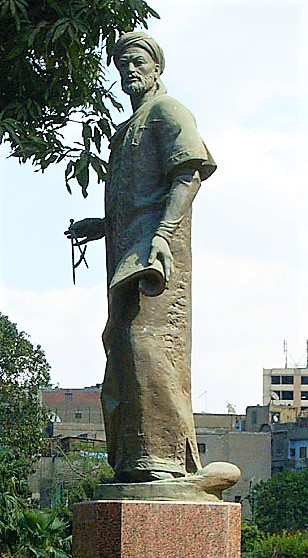
- The statue of al-Farghani in Cairo
- Born: 9th century Fergana valley, Sogdia
- Died: 9th century Egypt

Academic background
- Influences: Ptolemy

Academic work
- Era: Islamic Golden Age
- Main interests: Astronomy
- Notable works: The compendium (jawāmiʿ) of the Almagest, Treatise on the Astrolabe
- Influenced: Christopher Columbus, Nicolaus Copernicus, Al-Jūzjānī, al-Bīrūnī, Al-Qabisi

Abū al-ʿAbbās Aḥmad ibn Muḥammad ibn Kathīr al-Farghānī (Arabic: أبو العبّاس أحمد بن محمد بن كثير الفرغاني) also known as Alfraganus in the West (c. 800 – 870), was an astronomer in the Abbasid court in Baghdad, and one of the most famous astronomers in the 9th century. Al-Farghani composed several works on astronomy and astronomical equipment that were widely distributed in Arabic and Latin and were influential to many scientists. His best known work, Kitāb fī Jawāmiʿ ʿIlm al-Nujūmi (whose name translates to Elements of astronomy on the celestial motions), was an extensive summary of Ptolemy's Almagest containing revised and more accurate experimental data. Christopher Columbus used Al Farghani's calculations for his voyages to America (but mistakenly interpreted Arabic miles as Roman miles). In addition to making substantial contributions to astronomy, al-Farghani also worked as an engineer, supervising construction projects on rivers in Cairo, Egypt. The lunar crater Alfraganus is named after him.

== Life ==
Al-Farghani was born sometime in the early 9th century, and his last name suggests that his birthplace was most likely in Quva city, Farghana, Uzbekistan. He has been described as Arab, Persian, or Turkic. He was involved in the calculation of the diameter of the Earth by the measurement of the meridian arc length, together with a team of scientists under the patronage of the ʿAbbāsid caliph al-Ma'mūn in Baghdad. Later he moved to Cairo, where he composed a treatise on the astrolabe around 856. There, he also supervised the construction of the large Nilometer, called the New Nilometer, on the Rawda Island (in Old Cairo) at the behest of the ʿAbbāsid caliph al-Mutawakkil, which was completed in the year 861. This instrument allowed the height of the Nile to be measured in the event of a flood. Also in Cairo, al-Farghani was tasked with building a canal, called al-Ja‘fari, by the two brothers Muhammad and Ahmad ibn Musa, who were themselves ordered by al-Mutawakkil to oversee the construction of the canal. Reports indicate that al-Farghani made a critical mistake in the design of the canal, and had the entrance of the canal dug too deep for water to enter the rest of the canal without unusually high water levels. Al-Mutawakkil was enraged when he heard of the mistake, and so he sent Sanad ibn ‘Ali to assess the culpability of the brothers Muhammad and Ahmad who contracted al-Fraghani to build it. Sanad ibn ‘Ali ultimately reported (deceitfully) to al-Mutawakkil that there was no mistake in the design of the canal created by al-Farghani, which delayed any consequences long enough for the controversy to cease abruptly after the assassination of al-Mutawakkil in 861 that resulted in the canal remaining unfinished. Al-Farghani died in Egypt sometime after 861.

There is some debate about whether the two names for al-Farghani, Muhammad ibn Kath lr and Ahmad ibn Muhammad ibn Kat, mentioned in historical sources refer to two different people, but most historians argue that both names describe just one al-Farghani.

== Works ==
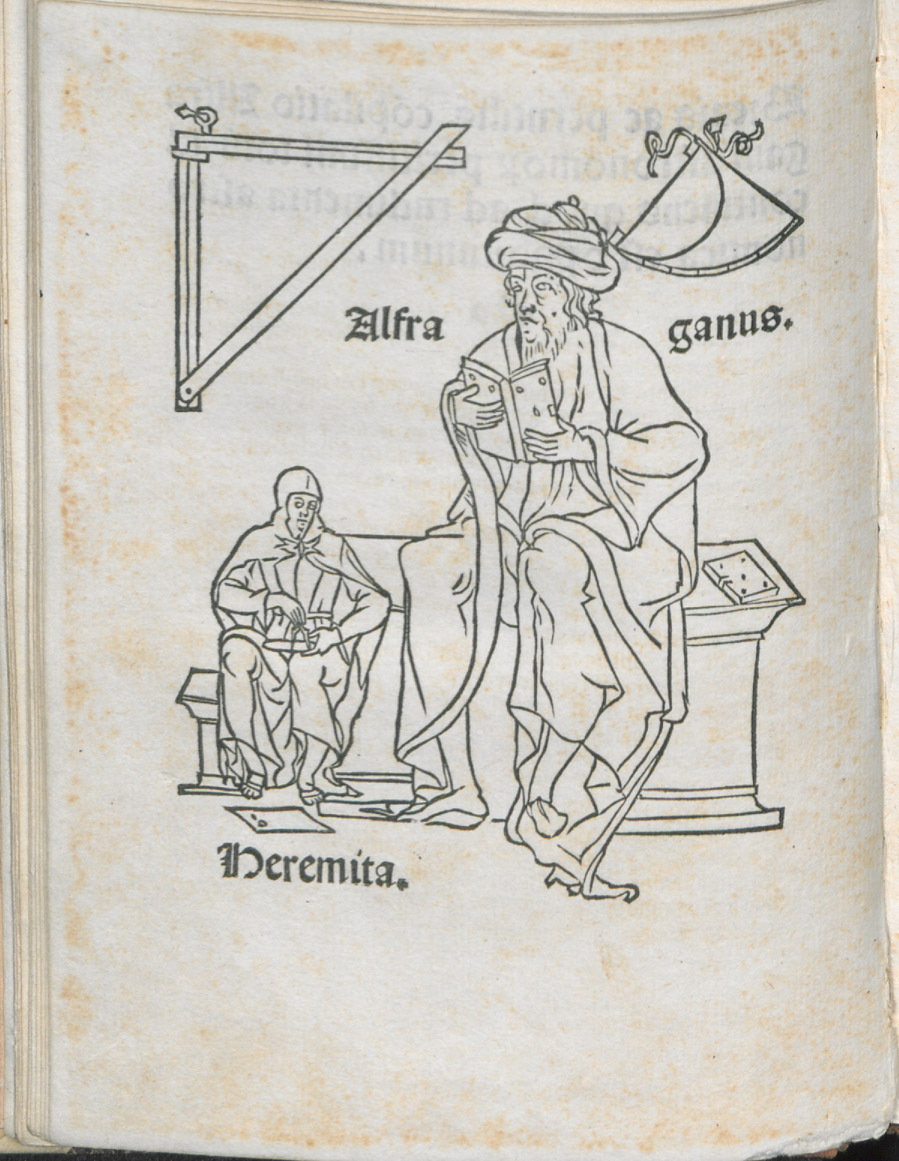
Portrait of Alfraganus in the Compilatio astronomica, 1493

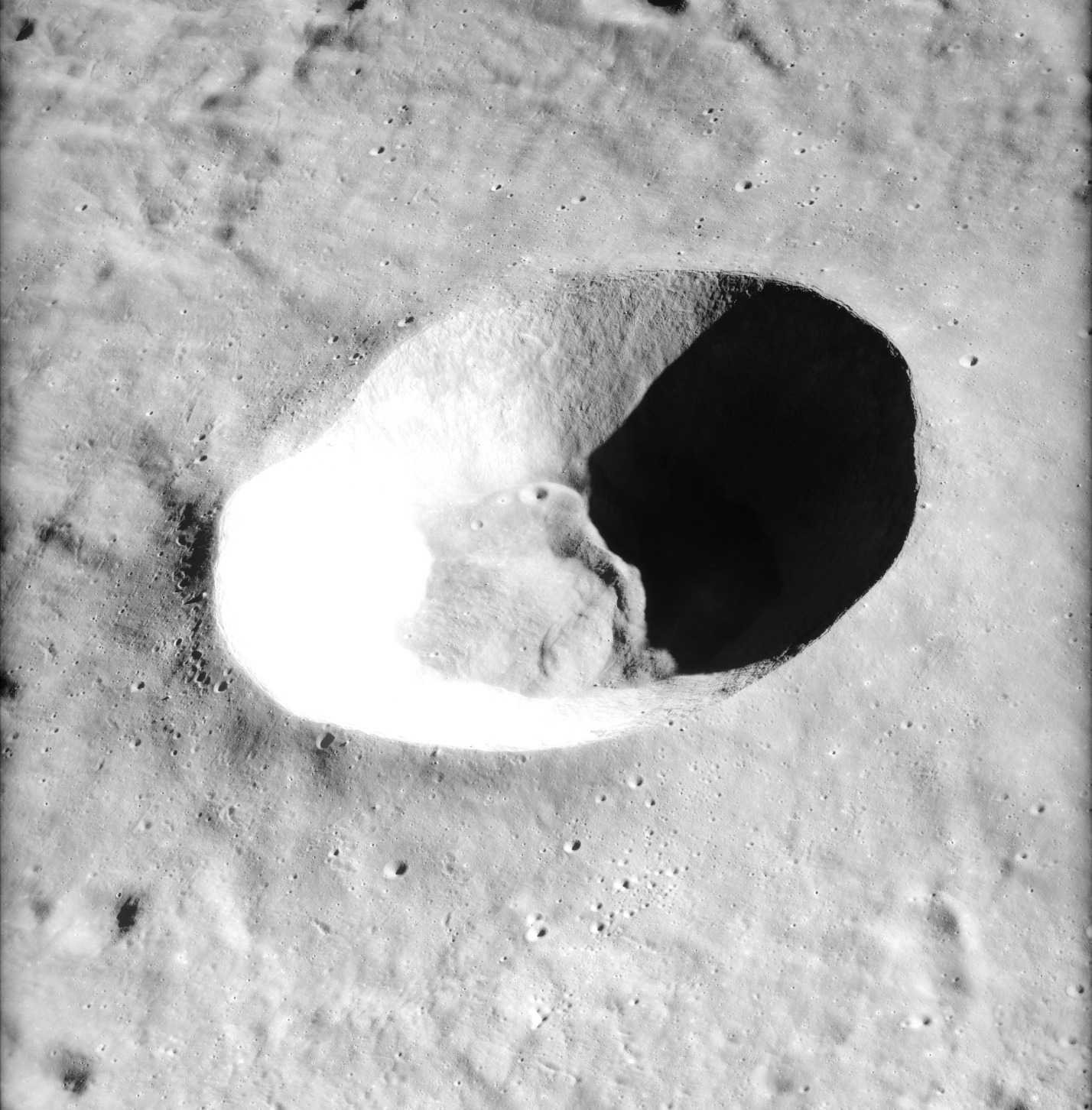
The Ferghani lunar crater is named after him.

The most influential work produced by al-Farghani was his textbook Kitāb fī Jawāmiʿ ʿIlm al-Nujūm (كتاب في جوامع علم النجوم A Compendium of the Science of the Stars) or Elements of astronomy on the celestial motions, written sometime between about 833 and 857. Elements was a descriptive summary of Ptolemy's Almagest that included the findings and revised values of earlier Islamic astronomers. Among the revisions included in the book were corrections to calculations of the circumference of the Earth, the Earth's axial tilt, and the apsides of the Sun and the Moon. Though al-Farghani's summary of Almagest contained these numerical corrections, the summary itself did not emphasize the mathematics of Ptolemy's astronomical theory and was instead focused more on conveying the conceptual parts of the theory in an easily-understood manner. Al-Farghani's book was translated into Latin in the 12th century by John of Seville in 1135 and later by Gerard of Cremona prior to 1175. These translations remained very popular in Europe until the time of Regiomontanus. Dante Alighieri's knowledge of Ptolemaic astronomy, which is evident in his Divina Commedia as well as other works such as the Convivio, seems to have been drawn from his reading of Alfraganus. Elements was also translated into Hebrew by Jacob Anatoli sometime from 1231 to 1235. This translation of Elements contains an additional section discussing Ptolemy's 48 constellations, which was probably also written by al-Farghani, but is not found in other translations of the book. Drawing primarily from Anatoli's Hebrew translation, but also from John of Seville's previous Latin translation, Jacob Christmann translated yet another Latin translation of Elements in 1590. In the 17th century the Dutch orientalist Jacob Golius published the Arabic text on the basis of a manuscript he had acquired in the Near East, accompanied by Golius' own Latin translation, the last recorded, and extensive notes and revisions.

Al-Farghani also wrote several documents about astronomical instruments. His most famous is his treatise on the astrolabe, which is the oldest surviving document that details the theoretical construction and use of the tool. Although historical sources indicate that there were probably other documents regarding the theory of astrolabes (including one written by al-Khwarizmi) circulating around the time that al-Farghani wrote his treatise, al-Farghani notes in his treatise that he was not aware of any such documents, suggesting that his treatise was a purely original work. Al-Farghani's treatise on the astrolabe provides the mathematical basis for the construction of the astrolabe, along with tables containing thousands of data points enabling the construction of astrolabes that function at varying lines of longitude. Though a theoretical basis for the construction of an astrolabe is presented in this work, the treatise lacked specific methods for physical construction because the purpose of the treatise was not to give instructions for building an astrolabe, but rather to provide mathematical justification for the functionality of the astrolabe. The work Kitāb al-Fihrist by Ibn al-Nadim suggests that al-Farghani was also responsible for writing a book about the use and function of sundials, though no copies exist in the present day.

In the 15th century, Christopher Columbus used al-Farghani's estimate for the Earth's circumference as the basis for his voyages to America. However, Columbus mistook al-Farghani's 7091-foot Arabic mile to be a 4856-foot Roman mile. This error caused him to underestimate the Earth's circumference, leading him to sail to North America while he believed that he was taking a shortcut to Asia.

== See also ==
- List of Iranian scientists and scholars
