= Brook Taylor =

English mathematician

Brook Taylor FRS
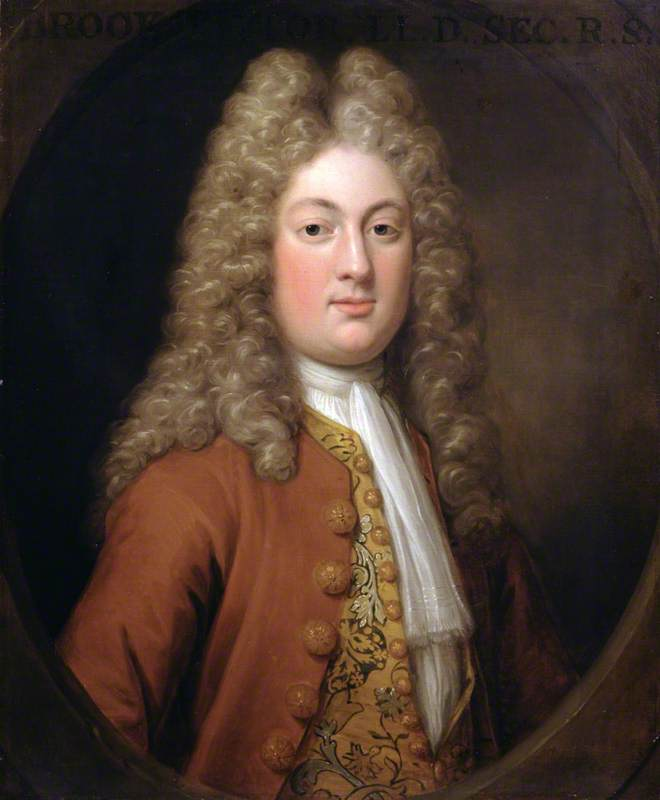
- Portrait, c. 1720
- Born: Brook Taylor; 18 August 1685; Edmonton, Middlesex, England
- Died: 29 December 1731 (aged 46); London, England
- Resting place: St Ann's, Soho
- Citizenship: English
- Education: St John's College, Cambridge
- Known for: Taylor's theorem Taylor series Finite difference Integration by parts
- Scientific career
- Fields: Mathematics
- Workplaces: St John's College, Cambridge
- Academic advisors: John Machin and John Keill

Brook Taylor FRS (18 August 1685 – 29 December 1731) was an English mathematician and barrister best known for several results in mathematical analysis. Taylor's most famous developments are Taylor's theorem and the Taylor series, essential in the infinitesimal approach of functions in specific points.

== Life and work ==
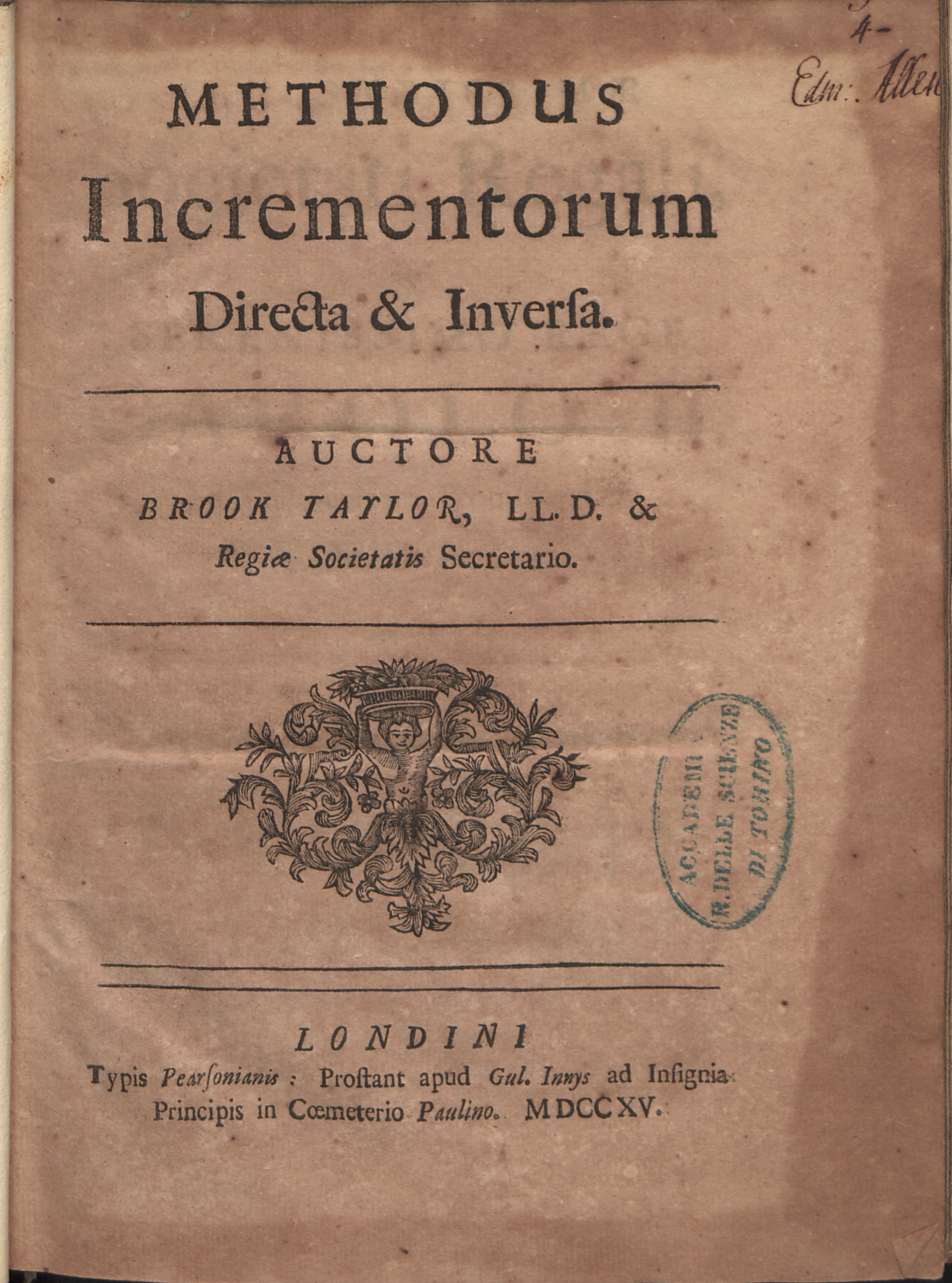
Methodus incrementorum directa et inversa, 1715

Brook Taylor was born in Edmonton (former Middlesex). Taylor was the son of John Taylor, MP of Patrixbourne, Kent and Olivia Tempest, the daughter of John Tempest of Edmonton, and not Sir Nicholas Tempest, Baronet of Durham.

He entered St John's College, Cambridge, as a fellow-commoner in 1701, and took degrees in LL.B. in 1709 and LL.D. in 1714. Taylor studied mathematics under John Machin and John Keill, leading to Taylor obtaining a solution to the problem of "center of oscillation". Taylor's solution remained unpublished until May 1714, when his claim to priority was disputed by Johann Bernoulli.

Taylor's Methodus Incrementorum Directa et Inversa (1715) ("Direct and Indirect Methods of Incrementation") added a new branch to higher mathematics, called "calculus of finite differences". Taylor used this development to determine the form of movement in vibrating strings. Taylor also wrote the first satisfactory investigation of astronomical refraction. The same work contains the well-known Taylor's theorem, the importance of which remained unrecognized until 1772, when Joseph-Louis Lagrange realized its usefulness and termed it "the main foundation of differential calculus".

In Taylor's 1715 essay Linear Perspective, Taylor set forth the principles of perspective in a more understandable form, but the work suffered from brevity and obscurity problems which plagued most of his writings, meaning the essay required further explanation in the treatises of Joshua Kirby (1754) and Daniel Fournier (1761).

Taylor was elected as a fellow in the Royal Society in 1712. In the same year, Taylor sat on the committee for adjudicating the claims of Sir Isaac Newton and Gottfried Leibniz. He acted as secretary to the society from 13 January 1714 to 21 October 1718.

From 1715 onward, Taylor's studies took a philosophical and religious bent. He corresponded with the Comte de Montmort on the subject of Nicolas Malebranche's tenets. Unfinished treatises written on his return from Aix-la-Chapelle in 1719, On the Jewish Sacrifices and On the Lawfulness of Eating Blood, were afterwards found among his papers.

Taylor was one of few English mathematicians, along with Isaac Newton and Roger Cotes, who was capable of holding his own with the Bernoullis, but a lack of clarity affected a great part of his demonstrations and Taylor lost brevity through his failure to express his ideas fully and clearly.

His health began to fail in 1717 after years of intense work.

Taylor married Miss Brydges of Wallington, Surrey in 1721 without his father's approval. The marriage led to an estrangement with his father, which improved in 1723 after Taylor's wife died in childbirth while giving birth to a son. Taylor's son did not survive.

He spent the next two years with his family at Bifrons, and in 1725 he married with his father's approval, Sabetta Sawbridge of Olantigh, Kent. She died in childbirth in 1730, though his only daughter, Elizabeth, survived.

Taylor's father died in 1729, leaving Taylor to inherit the Bifrons estate.

Taylor died at the age of 46, on 29 December 1731, at Somerset House, London.

== Selected writings ==
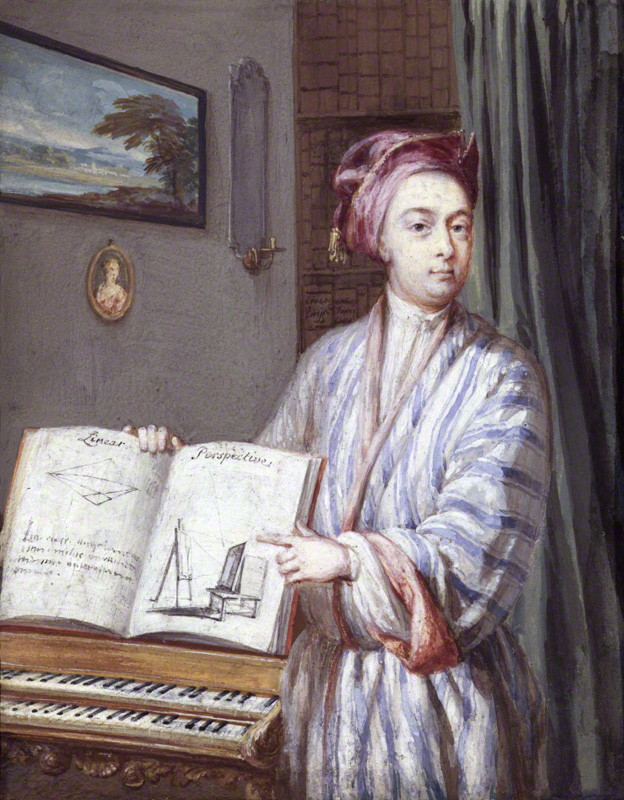
Brook Taylor

Taylor's grandson, Sir William Young, printed a posthumous work entitled Contemplatio Philosophica for private circulation in 1793, (2nd Bart., 10 January 1815). The work was prefaced by a biography, and had an appendix containing letters addressed to him by Bolingbroke, Bossuet, and others.

Several short papers by Taylor were published in Phil. Trans., vols. xxvii to xxxii, which including accounts of experiments in magnetism and capillary attraction. In 1719, Brook issued an improved version of his work on perspective, New Principles of Linear Perspective, which was revised by John Colson in 1749. A French translation was published in 1757. It was reprinted, with a portrait and short biography, in 1811.

- Taylor, Brook (1715a), Methodus Incrementorum Directa et Inversa, London: William Innys.
  - Annotated English translation by Ian Bruce
- Taylor, Brook (1715b), Linear Perspective: Or, a New Method of Representing Justly All Manner of Objects as They Appear to the Eye in All Situations, London: R. Knaplock.

== Tribute ==
Taylor is an impact crater located on the Moon, named in honor of Brook Taylor in 1935.
