= Alfraganus (crater) =

Crater on the Moon

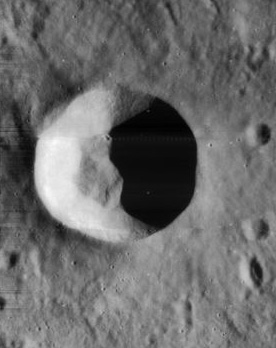
- Lunar Orbiter 4 image
- Coordinates: 5.4°S 19.0°E
- Diameter: 20.52 km
- Depth: 3.8 km
- Colongitude: 343° at sunrise
- Formation: Copernican
- Eponym: Alfraganus

Alfraganus is a small, deep lunar impact crater that lies in the rugged highland region to the southwest of the Mare Tranquillitatis. Northwest of Alfraganus is the crater Delambre, and to the south is the irregular Zöllner.

This impact is dated to the Copernican period, so it is relatively young and bright. The rim of Alfraganus is circular and retains a sharp edge that has not received a significant amount of wear due to subsequent impacts. The interior floor is roughly half the diameter of the crater rim, with two ridges aligned at right angles to each other. The crater lies at the center of a minor ray system.

This crater is named after the Muslim astronomer Alfraganus (unknown – c. 840). Its designation was formally adopted by the International Astronomical Union in 1935. The name was introduced into lunar nomenclature by Italian astronomer G. B. Ricciolli in 1651.

== Satellite craters ==
By convention these features are identified on lunar maps by placing the letter on the side of the crater midpoint that is closest to Alfraganus.

Alfraganus	Latitude	Longitude	Diameter
A	3.0° S	20.3° E	13 km
C	6.1° S	18.1° E	11 km
D	4.0° S	20.1° E	8 km
E	4.6° S	19.0° E	4 km
F	3.5° S	20.8° E	9 km
G	2.6° S	21.2° E	6 km
H	4.4° S	19.1° E	13 km
K	5.3° S	19.5° E	4 km
M	5.6° S	19.6° E	3 km

== Alfraganus C during full moon ==
Satellite crater Alfraganus C, southwest of Alfraganus, looks bright during full moon. This brightness is also noticeable on the photographic version of chart LAC 78 (page 156) in The Clementine Atlas of the Moon (Ben Bussey / Paul D. Spudis).

== Gallery ==
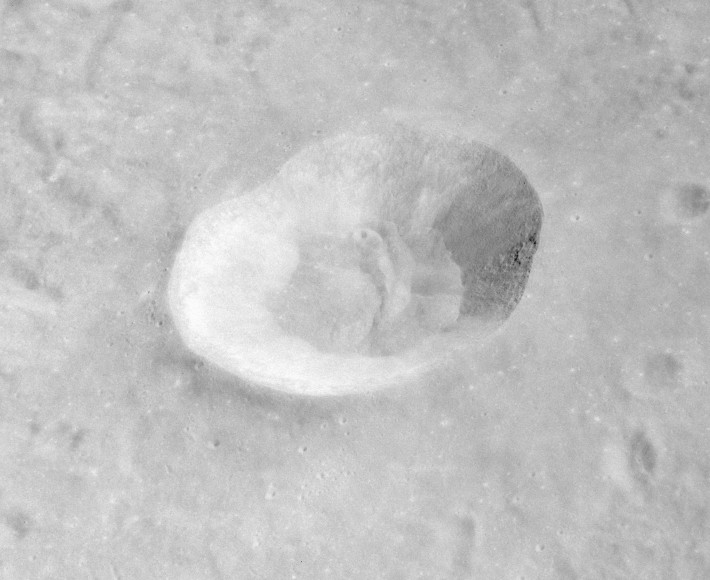
Oblique view of Alfraganus from Apollo 16 Metric Camera

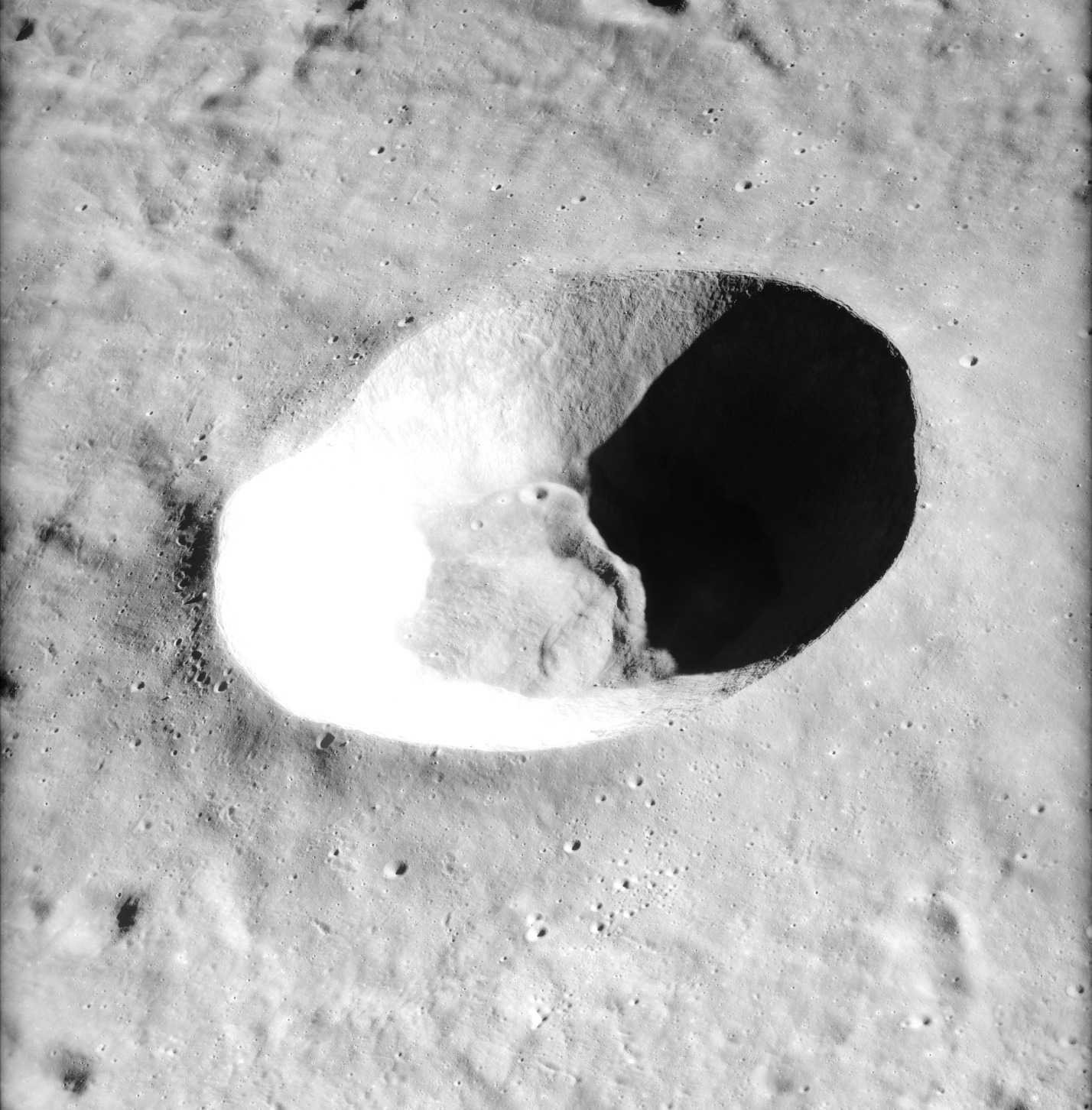
Oblique view of Alfraganus from Apollo 16 Panoramic Camera
