= Beaumont (crater) =

Crater on the Moon

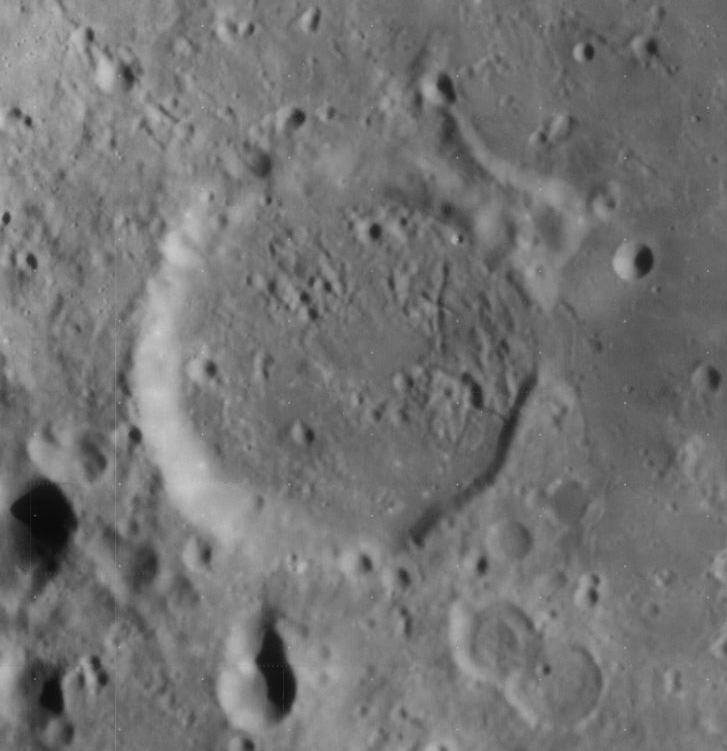
- Lunar Orbiter 4 image
- Coordinates: 18.0°S 28.8°E
- Diameter: 50.69 km
- Depth: 1.7 km
- Colongitude: 332° at sunrise
- Eponym: L. É. de Beaumont

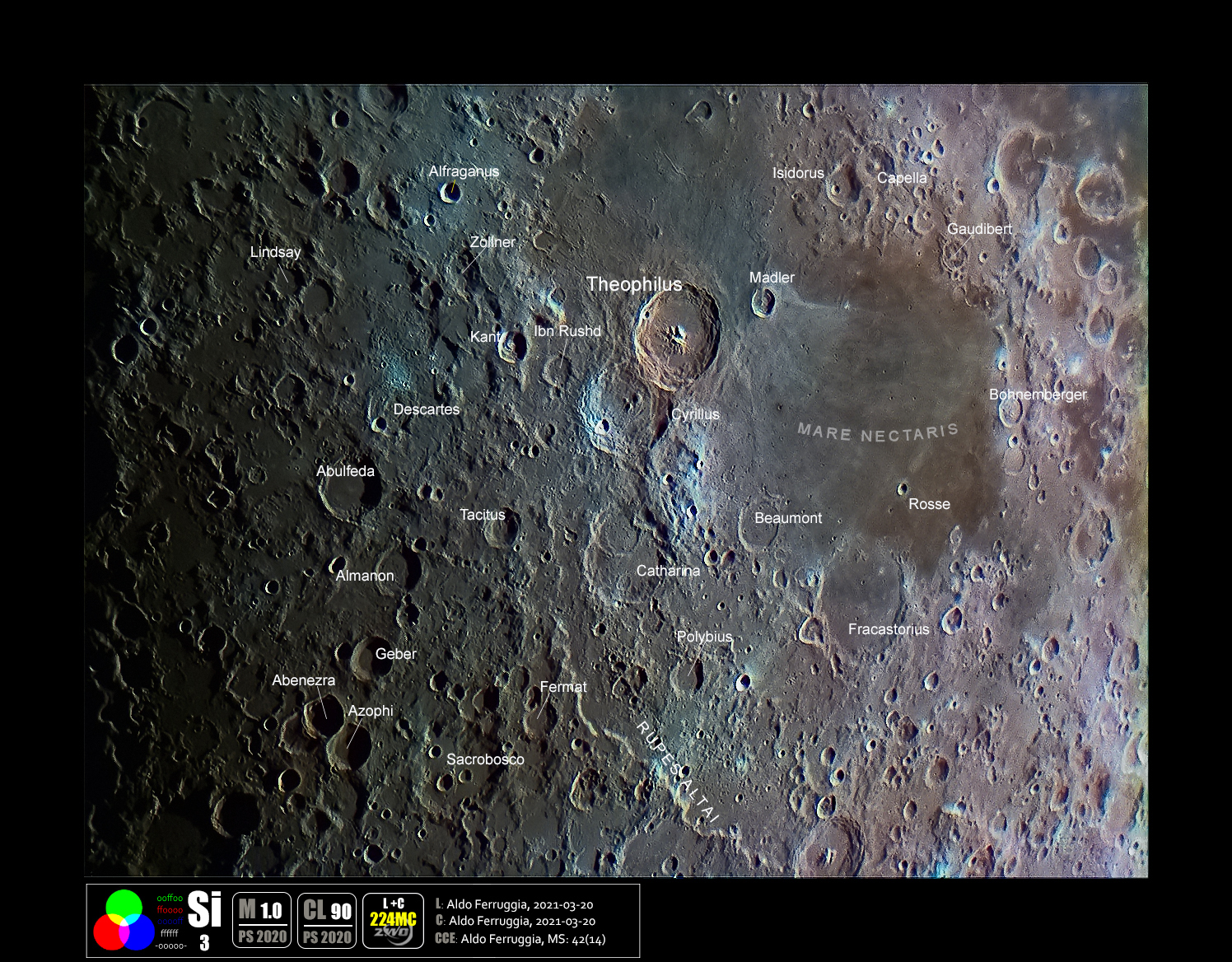
Location of Beaumont (center-right)

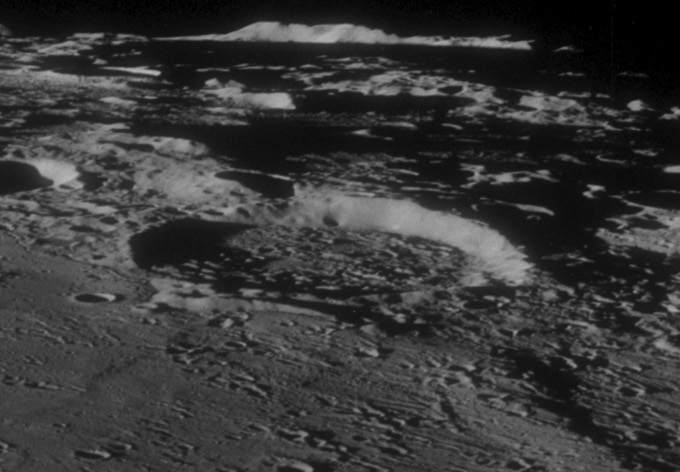
Oblique view facing south from Apollo 11

Beaumont is a basalt-flooded crater located on the southwestern shore of the Mare Nectaris on Earth's Moon. English amateur astronomer Patrick Moore called this "an excellent example of a bay". It lies to the northwest of the similarly flooded crater remnant Fracastorius. To the west is the prominent crater Catharina.

The rim of Beaumont is breached in the east, where the basaltic flow from Mare Nectaris broached the crater and flooded the interior. Now only a worn and crater-impacted outer wall remains. If the crater once possessed a central peak, it is no longer apparent. The floor contains several hills and small craters. To the west of the breach, a narrow 10-km long rille runs southward across the floor. A low ridge runs northward from the crater rim across the Mare Nectaris. The infrared spectrum of pure crystalline plagioclase has been identified on the southeast floor.

The crater is named after French geologist Léonce Élie de Beaumont (1798-1874). The name was incorporated into lunar nomenclature by German astronomer Johann Mädler in the 19th century. It was formally adopted by the International Astronomical Union in 1935.

== Beaumont during full moon ==
Although almost everything of Beaumont is invisible or unrecognizable during full moon, bright satellite crater Beaumont D, northwest of Beaumont itself, is an eye catcher which forms a distinctive triangle with the bright satellite craters Cyrillus E and Cyrillus G. The brightness of these three satellite craters is also noticeable on the photographic versions of charts LAC 78 (page 156) and LAC 96 (page 192) in The Clementine Atlas of the Moon (Ben Bussey / Paul D. Spudis).

== Satellite craters ==
By convention these features are identified on lunar maps by placing the letter on the side of the crater midpoint that is closest to Beaumont.

Beaumont	Latitude	Longitude	Diameter
A	16.3° S	27.7° E	14 km
B	18.6° S	26.8° E	16 km
C	20.2° S	28.0° E	6 km
D	17.0° S	26.2° E	11 km
E	18.8° S	27.5° E	18 km
F	18.3° S	26.6° E	10 km
G	20.3° S	27.1° E	8 km
H	17.2° S	28.4° E	6 km
J	19.9° S	26.5° E	5 km
K	17.5° S	30.1° E	6 km
L	14.4° S	30.0° E	4 km
M	19.4° S	28.6° E	10 km
N	16.9° S	27.7° E	5 km
P	19.9° S	29.6° E	17 km
R	17.9° S	30.7° E	4 km

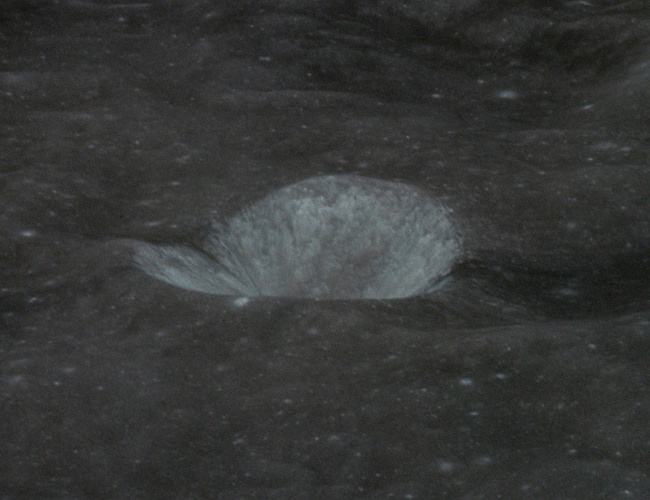
Beaumont D from Apollo 14

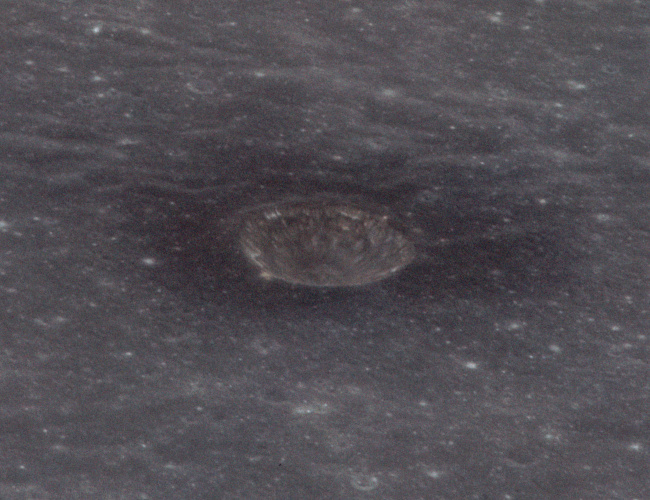
The small dark-halo crater Beaumont L, from Apollo 14

Satellite crater Beaumont L on Mare Nectaris is a dark-halo crater, which means that the impact event unearthed cryptomare material that now covers the surrounding surface. The spectrum shows the excavated material is rich in olivine. Beaumont D is associated with an outcropping of pure anorthosite.

Rusty colored bands and a brownish hue on the floor of satellite crater Beaumont L were observed by the crew of Apollo 14 while they were in orbit around the moon.
