= Fracastorius (crater) =

Crater on the Moon

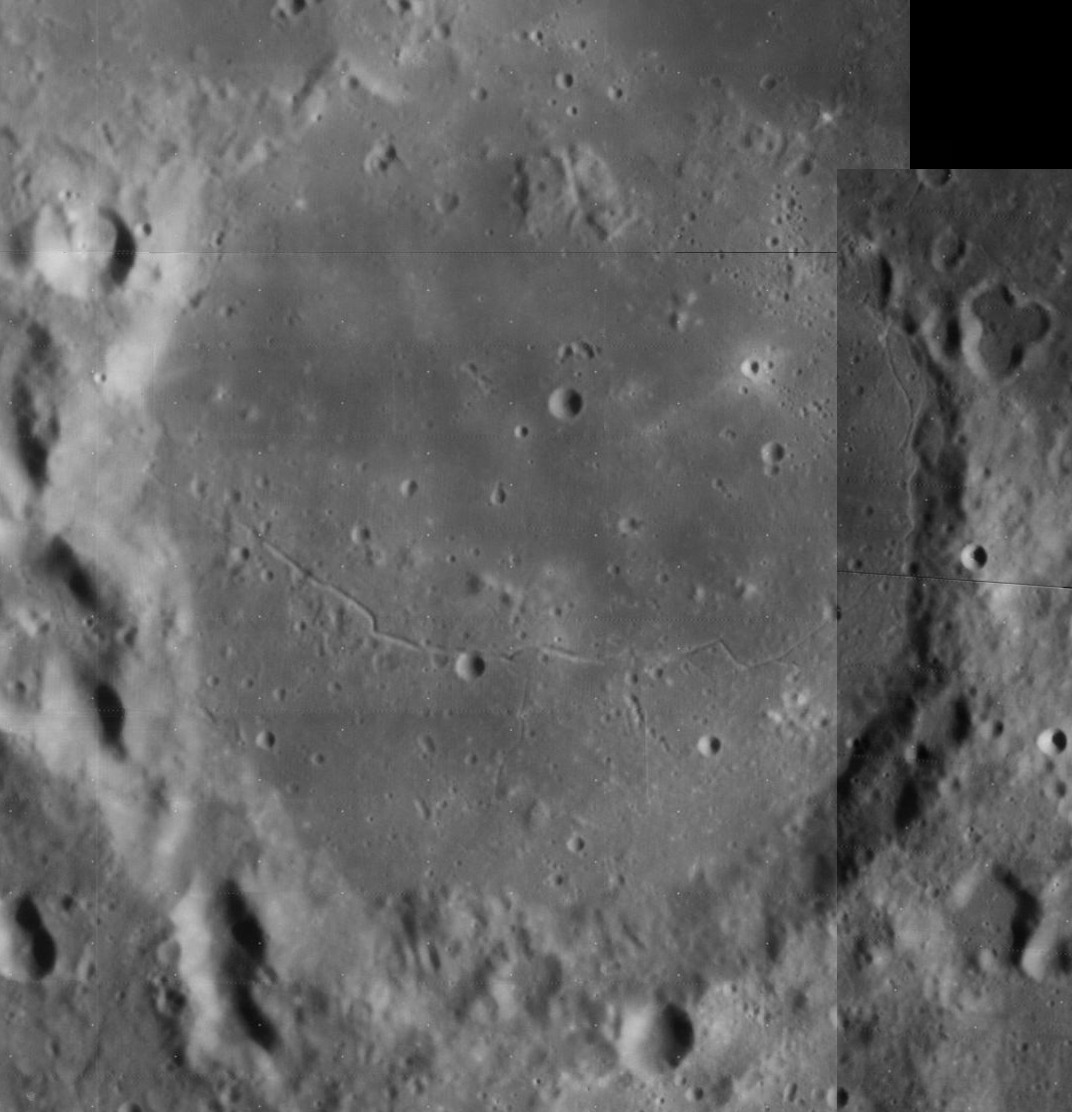
- Mosaic of Lunar Orbiter 4 images
- Coordinates: 21.2°S 33.0°E
- Diameter: 120.58 km (74.92 mi)
- Depth: None
- Colongitude: 327° at sunrise
- Eponym: Girolamo Fracastoro

Fracastorius is the lava-flooded remnant of an ancient lunar impact crater located at the southern edge of Mare Nectaris. T. W. Webb describes this as "a partially destroyed ring." To the northwest of this formation lies the crater Beaumont, while to the northeast is Rosse.

The northern wall of this crater is missing, with only mounds appearing in the lunar mare to mark the outline. The lava basalt that formed Mare Nectaris also invaded this crater, so the structure now forms a bay-like extension. The remainder of the rim is heavily worn and covered in lesser impact craters, leaving little of the original rim intact. The maximum elevation of the rim is 2.4 km. The most prominent of these craters is Fractastorius D, which overlies a portion of the western rim. Fracastorius has no central peak, but a long, slender rille runs across the southern half of the floor in a generally east–west direction.

There is a dome with a vent structure located in the boundary area between Fracastorius and Mare Nectaris. It has a height of 241.5 m (792 ft) with a diameter of 28.6 km (17.8 mi).

This crater commemorates the Italian scholar, astronomer and poet Girolamo Fracastoro, "Fracastorius" (1478–1553). His name was incorporated into lunar nomenclature by Italian astronomer Giovanni B. Riccioli in 1651. Its designation was formally adopted by the International Astronomical Union in 1935.

== Satellite craters ==
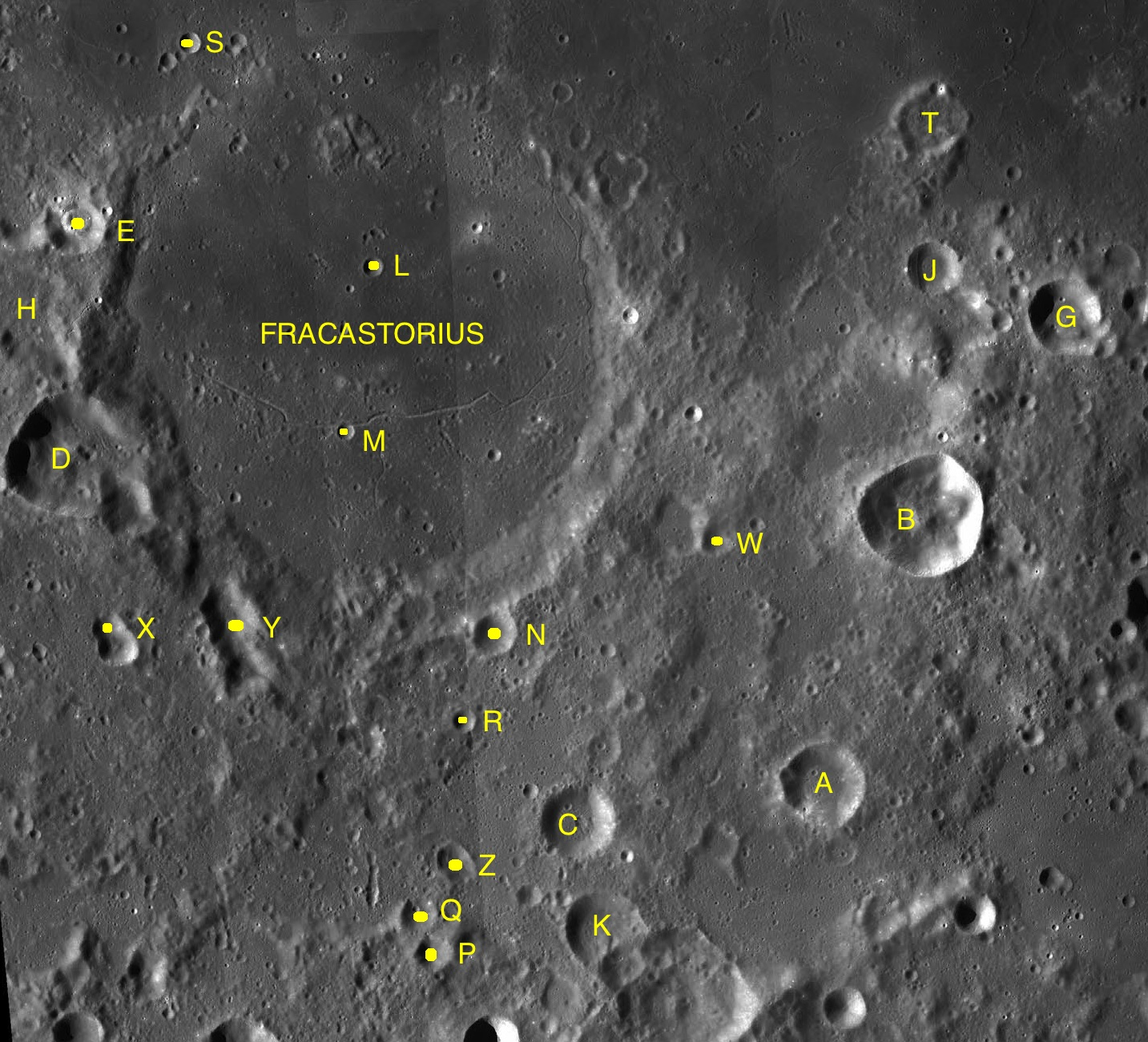
Satellite craters of Fracastorius

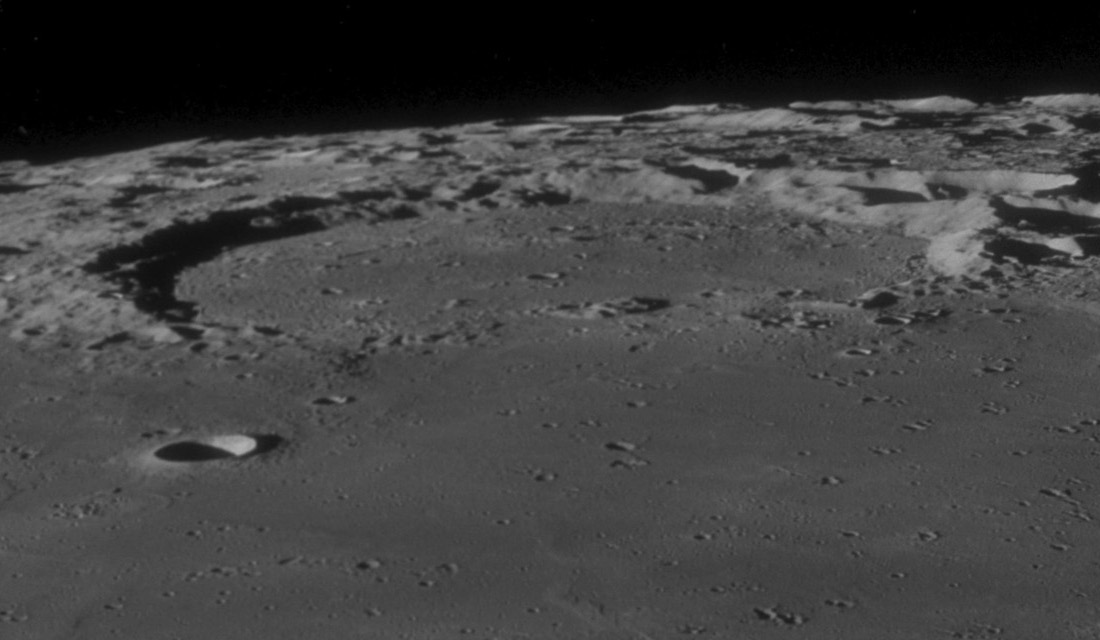
Oblique view facing south from Apollo 11. The small crater in left foreground is Rosse.

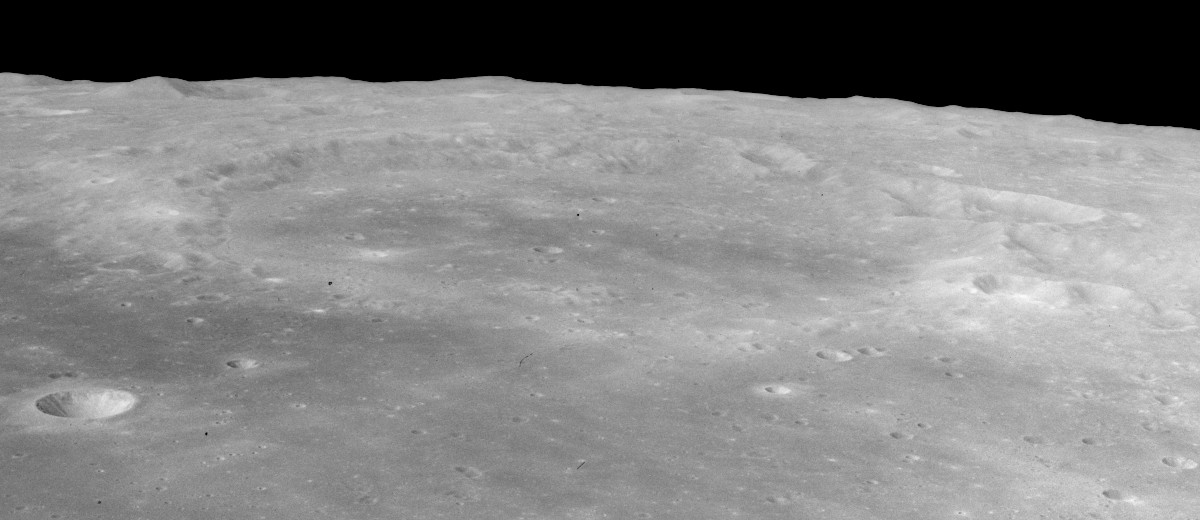
Similar view with different lighting from Apollo 16

By convention these features are identified on lunar maps by placing the letter on the side of the crater midpoint that is closest to Fracastorius.

Fracastorius	Latitude	Longitude	Diameter
A	24.4° S	36.5° E	18 km
B	22.5° S	37.2° E	27 km
C	24.6° S	34.6° E	16 km
D	21.8° S	30.9° E	28 km
E	20.2° S	31.0° E	13 km
G	21.2° S	38.3° E	16 km
H	20.7° S	30.6° E	21 km
J	20.8° S	37.4° E	12 km
K	25.4° S	34.7° E	17 km
L	20.6° S	33.2° E	5 km
M	21.7° S	32.9° E	4 km
N	23.2° S	34.0° E	10 km
P	25.5° S	33.3° E	8 km
Q	25.1° S	33.2° E	8 km
R	23.8° S	33.7° E	5 km
S	19.0° S	31.9° E	5 km
T	19.8° S	37.4° E	14 km
W	22.6° S	35.7° E	7 km
X	23.0° S	31.1° E	7 km
Y	23.0° S	32.0° E	12 km
Z	24.8° S	33.6° E	9 km
