= Rupes Altai =

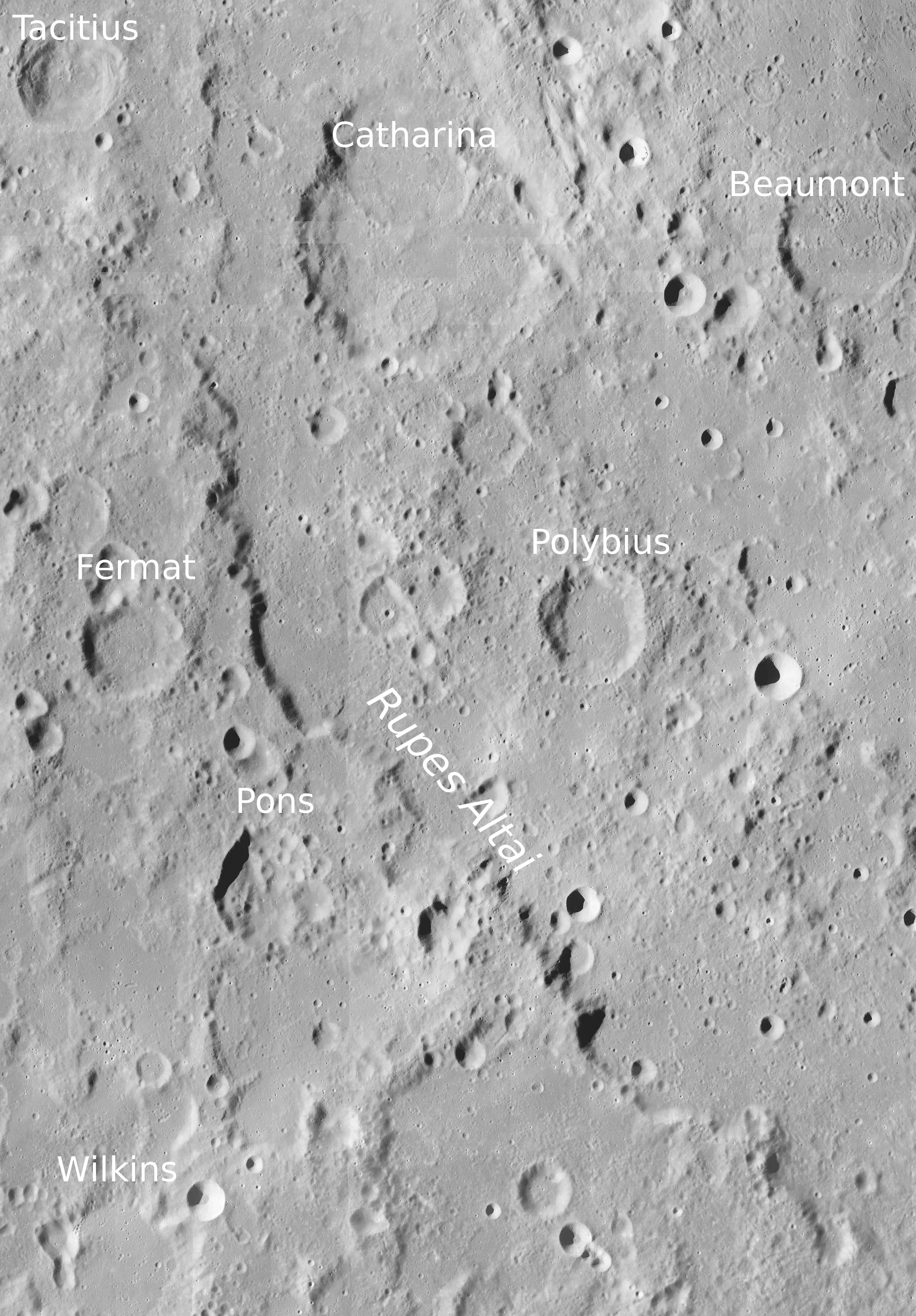
Rupes Altai in the middle

Rupes Altai is an escarpment in the lunar surface that is located in the southeastern quadrant of the Moon's near side. It is named for the Altai Mountains in Asia, and is the most prominent lunar escarpment. The selenographic coordinates of this feature are 24.3°S 22.6°E, and it has a length of about 427 km.

The southeastern end of the cliff terminates along the western edge of the crater Piccolomini. It then arcs irregularly towards the north, climbing to heights of nearly a kilometer. The northern end of the arc is an irregular region with no clearly defined terminus, where it brackets the prominent craters Theophilus, Cyrillus, and Catharina. This cliff forms the southwestern rim of the Nectaris impact basin.

This feature is difficult to locate during the full moon when the sunlight is nearly overhead. It appears as a bright, winding line about five days after the new moon, and casts a long, irregular shadow about four days after the full moon, when the sunset terminator is nearby and the sunlight is arriving at a low angle.
