= Cyrillus (crater) =

Crater on the Moon

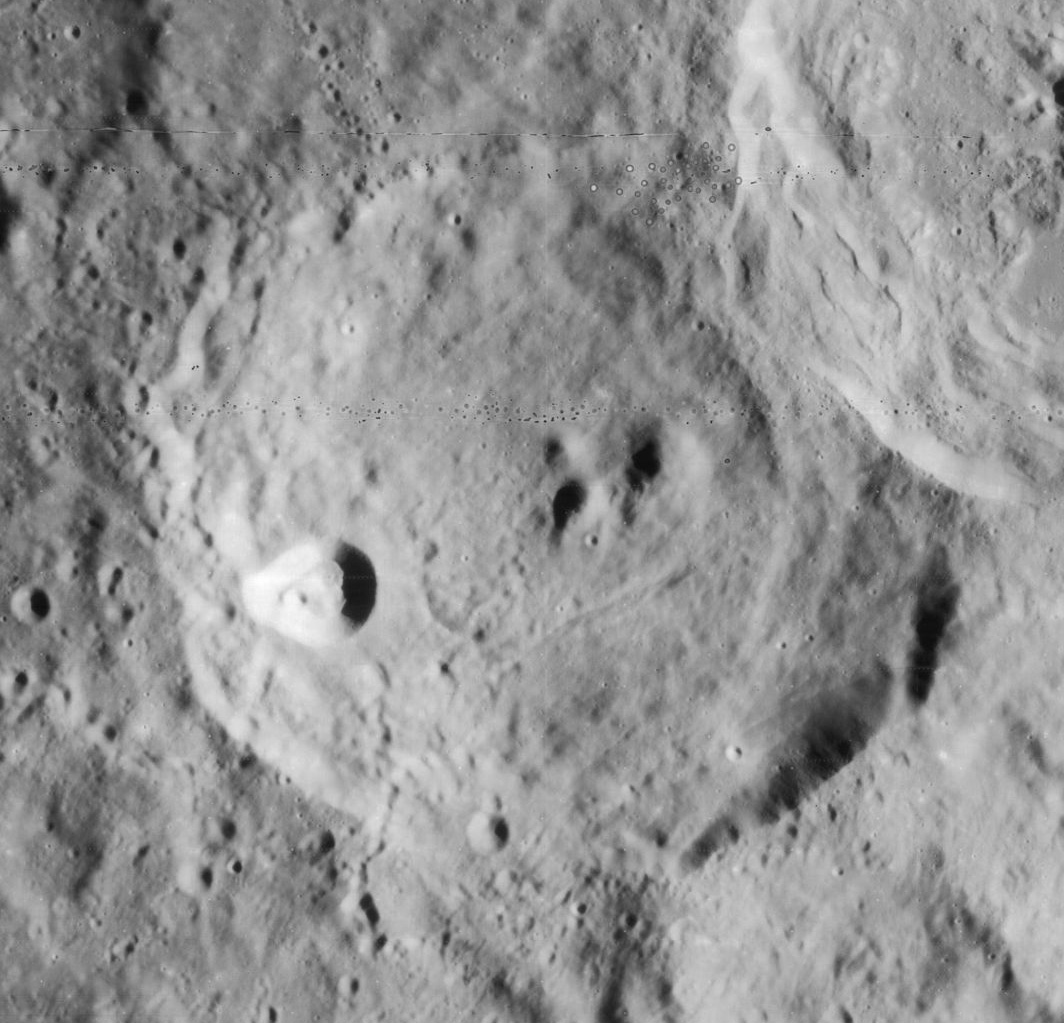
- Lunar Orbiter 4 image
- Coordinates: 13.2°S 24.0°E
- Diameter: 98.09 km (60.95 mi)
- Depth: 3.6 km (2.2 mi)
- Colongitude: 335° at sunrise
- Formation: Nectarian
- Eponym: Saint Cyril

Cyrillus is a lunar impact crater located on the northwest edge of Mare Nectaris. Intruding into the northeast rim is the slightly larger, and younger crater Theophilus. To the south is another prominent crater named Catharina. Together these three craters form a prominent trio in the southeast quadrant of the Moon. To the northwest are the Ibn-Rushd and Kant craters.

This formation is named after Saint Cyril of Alexandria, a 5th-century Patriarch and theologian. His name was included as 'S. Cyrillus Alex.' in the lunar nomenclature of Italian astronomer Giovanni B. Riccioli in 1651. Its modern designation was formally adopted by the International Astronomical Union in 1935.

== Description ==
This formation dates to the Nectarian epoch of the lunar geologic timescale. The floor of Cyrillus contains a reduced central hill and the considerable crater Cyrillus A. The walls of the broken formation of Cyrillus remain intact until the point of junction with Theophilus. The central peak of Cyrillus and ejecta to the southwest are olivine-rich. Slightly northeast of its center, three rounded mountains rise to heights of 1,000 metres above Cyrillus' floor: Cyrillus Alpha, Delta, and Eta.

A tiny crater with bright rays on the east side of Cyrillus has been named Shioli. A point to the east of Shioli was the proposed landing site of Japan's SLIM lander. It landed on the Moon on January 19, 2024, within 100m of the targeted landing zone.

== Cyrillus during full moon ==
The bright satellite crater Cyrillus A on the west-southwestern inner slopes of Cyrillus itself is a handy guide for observers of the full moon, to find the location of the very difficult to trace Cyrillus. The bright white looking Cyrillus A and the almost invisible appearance of Cyrillus are also noticeable on the photographic version of chart LAC 78 (page 156) in The Clementine Atlas of the Moon (Ben Bussey / Paul D. Spudis).

== Satellite craters ==
By convention these features are identified on lunar maps by placing the letter on the side of the crater midpoint that is closest to Cyrillus.

| Cyrillus | Latitude | Longitude | Diameter |
|---|---|---|---|
| A | 13.8° S | 23.1° E | 17 km |
| C | 12.3° S | 21.5° E | 12 km |
| E | 15.8° S | 25.3° E | 11 km |
| F | 15.3° S | 25.5° E | 44 km |
| G | 15.6° S | 26.6° E | 8 km |

The following craters have been renamed by the IAU.

- Cyrillus B — See Ibn-Rushd crater.
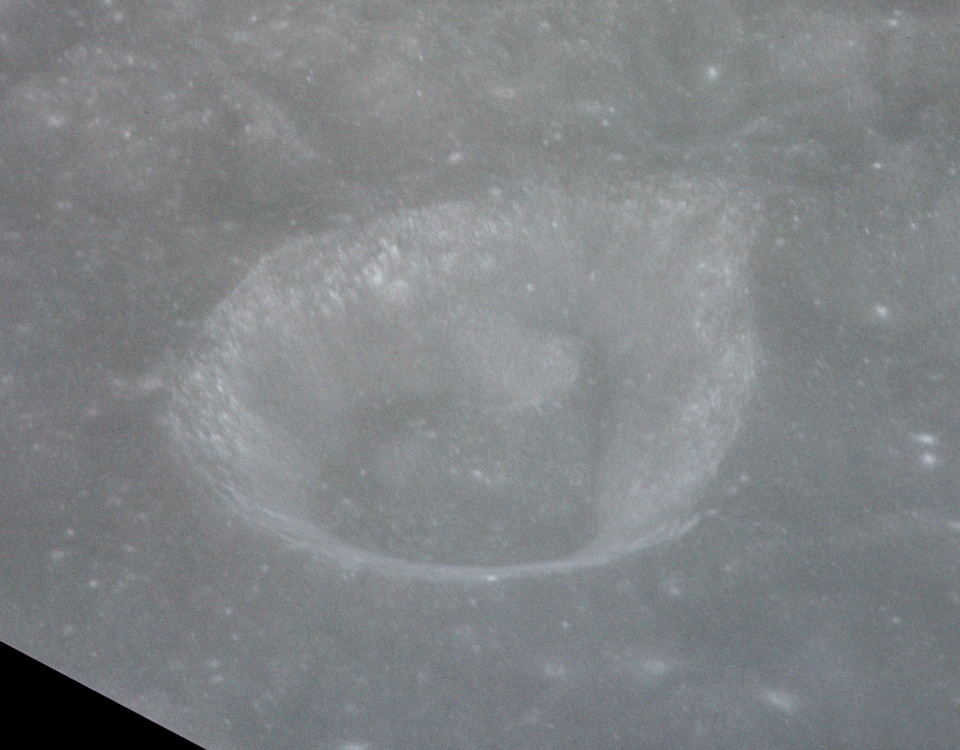
Cyrillus A, facing southwest, from Apollo 14

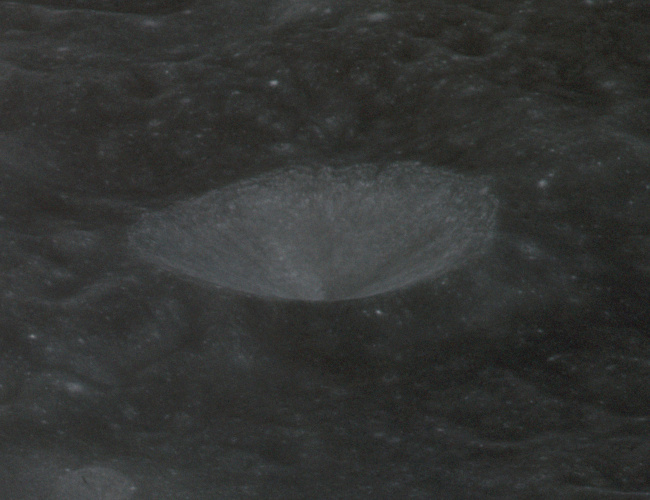
Cyrillus E, facing southwest, from Apollo 14

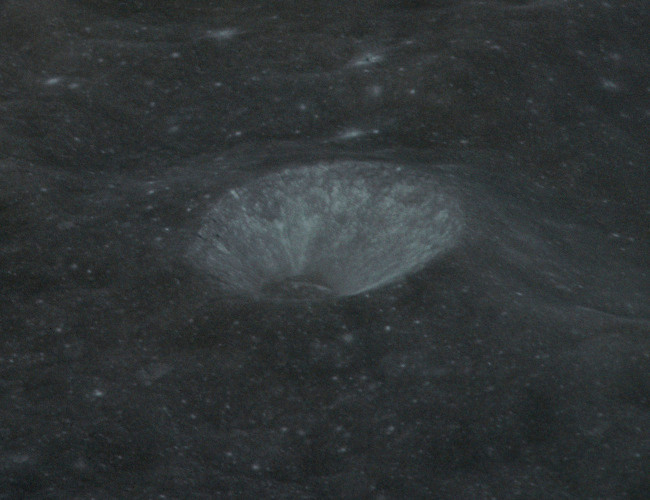
Cyrillus G, facing southwest, from Apollo 14
