= Hase (disambiguation) =

Hase is a river in north-western Germany.

Hase may also refer to:

== Places ==
- Hase (crater), on the Moon
- Hase, Nagano, a village in Kamiina District, Nagano, Japan

== People ==
- Hase (surname)
- Hase Ferhatović (1933–1987), Yugoslav footballer

== Other uses ==
- Hase, an outdoor sculpture at Colletto Fava near Genoa, Italy
- September Hase, an alternative rock band from Nashville, Tennessee
