= Hase (surname) =

Hase is a surname, and may refer to:

- Annemarie Hase (1900–1971), German actress and cabaret artist
- Arihiro Hase (1965–1996), Japanese voice actor
- Carl Benedict Hase (1780–1864), French Hellenist
- Chieko Hase (born 1956), Japanese football player
- Conrad Wilhelm Hase (1818–1902), German architect and academic
- Dagmar Hase (born 1969), German swimmer
- Elisabeth Hase (1905–1991), German photographer
- Ella Hase (born 2002), American soccer player
- Georgia Hase (1938–2015), American roller derby manager
- Henry Hase (politician) (1847–1929), American politician from Milwaukee
- Henry Hase (cashier) (1763–1829), Chief Cashier of the Bank of England
- Hiroshi Hase (born 1961), Japanese wrestler
- Hitomi Hase (born Hokkaido), Japanese voice actress
- Hitoshi Hase (born 1973), Japanese lightweight rower
- Juan Carlos Hase (1948–2022), Argentine chess master
- Karl Hase (1800–1890), German Protestant theologian and church historian
- Keiji Hase (born 1935), Japanese swimmer
- Johann Matthias Hase (1684–1742), German mathematician, astronomer and cartographer
- Marica Hase, Japanese porn actress
- Mika Hase (born 1984), Japanese singer and songwriter
- Minerva Fabienne Hase (born 1999), German pair skater
- Patrick Hase, British Hong Kong historian
- Sanji Hase (1936–2002), Japanese voice actor
- Tomohiro Hase, Japanese electrical engineer
- William Frederick Hase (1874–1935), United States Army major general
- Yurina Hase (born 1979), Japanese singer-songwriter and idol

== See also ==
- von Hase
- Hasse
