= Adams (lunar crater) =

Lunar impact crater

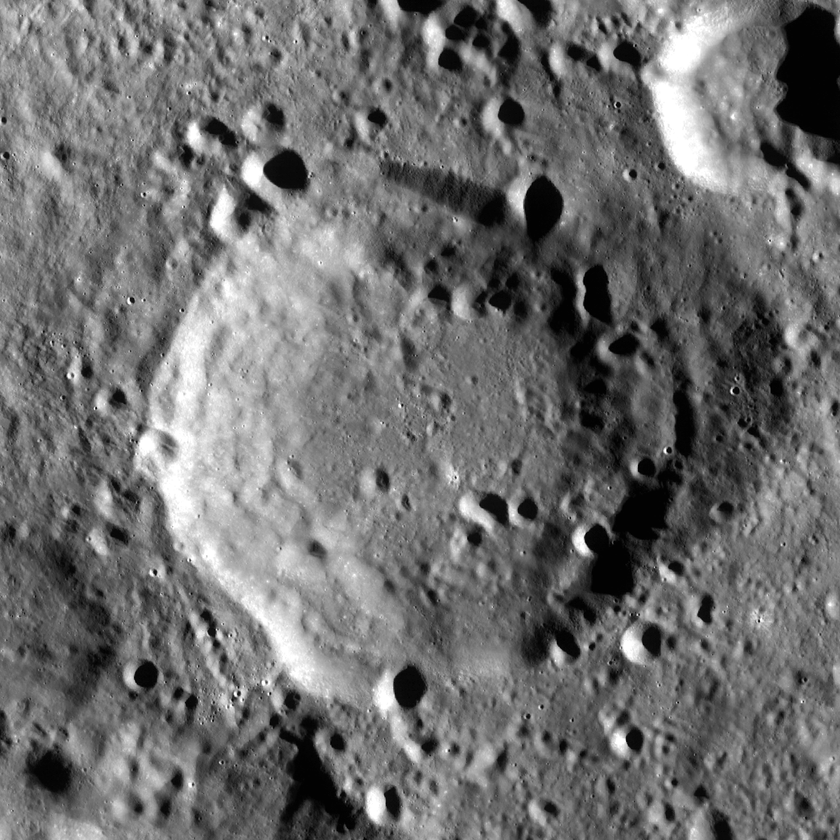
- LRO image of Adams
- Coordinates: 31.9°S 68.2°E
- Diameter: 63.27 km
- Depth: 2.0 km
- Colongitude: 293° at sunrise
- Formation: Nectarian
- Eponym: John C. Adams; Walter S. Adams; Charles H. Adams

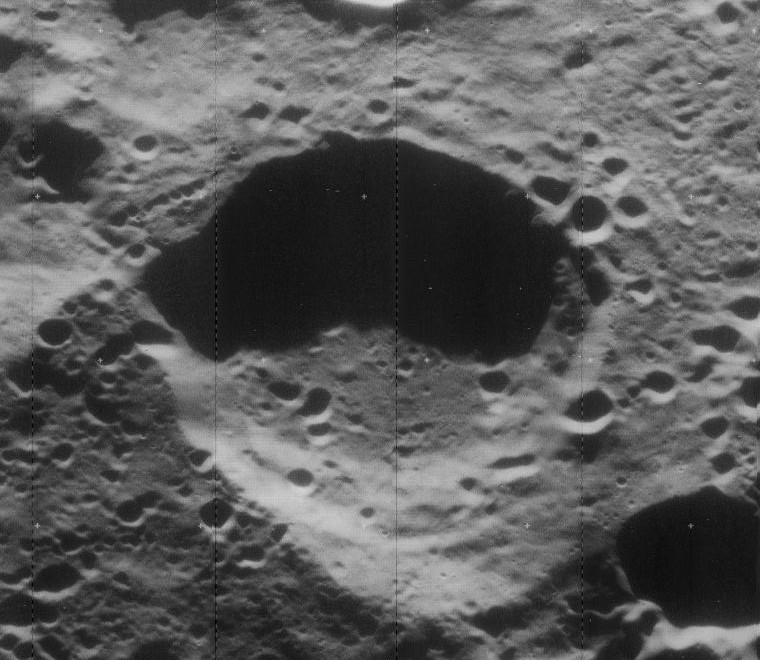
Oblique Lunar Orbiter 4 image, facing west

Adams is a lunar impact crater that is located in the rugged southeastern section of the Moon, near the lunar limb. It lies just to the southwest of the crater Legendre. To the northwest are the craters Hase and Petavius, and to the southwest is Furnerius. To the southwest of Adams is a system of rilles designated the Rimae Hase. The longest of these rilles follows a course to the southeast.

Adams is a crater of Nectarian age on the lunar geologic timescale. The rim of Adams is generally circular in form, but somewhat worn by small impact craters. There is a slight notched protrusion at the southern end of the wall. The floor is undistinguished, with no significant protrusions, and only minor craters. There are some small hills around the floor.

Adams' name jointly honours three astronomers of that name: John Couch Adams, Walter Sydney Adams and Charles Hitchcock Adams. This designation was formally adopted by the International Astronomical Union in 1970. It was introduced into lunar nomenclature by William R. Birt and John Lee during the 19th century.

== Satellite craters ==
By convention these features are identified on lunar maps by placing the letter on the side of the crater midpoint that is closest to Adams.

Adams	Latitude	Longitude	Diameter
B	31.5° S	65.6° E	28 km
C	32.3° S	65.5° E	10 km
D	32.5° S	71.6° E	42 km
M	34.8° S	69.2° E	24 km
P	35.2° S	71.0° E	24 km

== See also ==
- 1996 Adams, asteroid
