= Palitzsch (disambiguation) =

Johann Georg Palitzsch (1723–1788) was a German astronomer.

Palitzsch may also refer to:

- Gerhard Palitzsch (1913–1944), German SS non-commissioned officer in Auschwitz concentration camp
- Palitzsch (crater) and Vallis Palitzsch, moon features
- 11970 Palitzsch, an asteroid
- Peter Palitzsch (1918–2004), a German theatre director associated with Bertold Brecht
