= Legendre (crater) =

Crater on the Moon

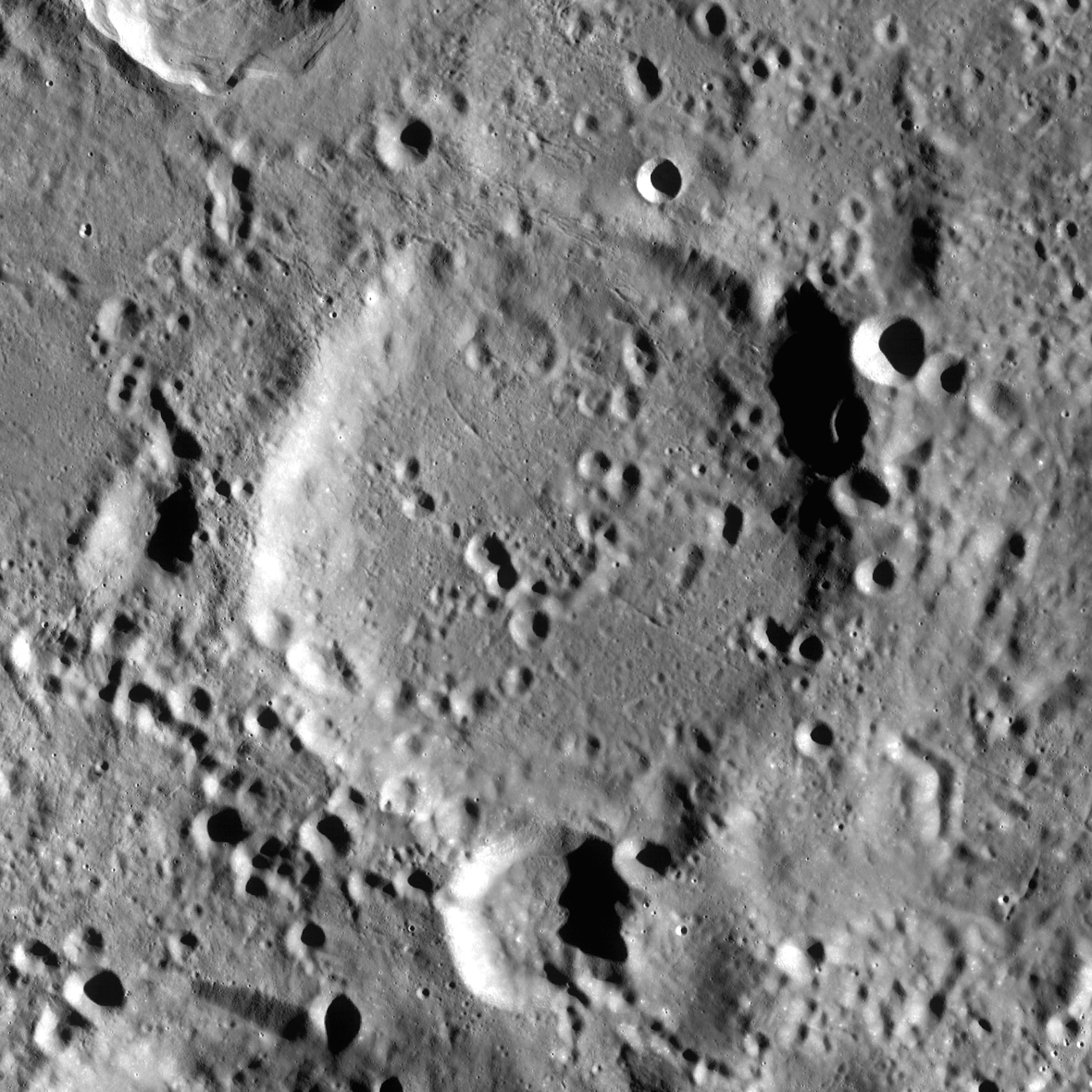
- Lunar Reconnaissance Orbiter image
- Coordinates: 28.92°S 70.02°E
- Diameter: 78 km
- Depth: 2.7 km
- Colongitude: 292° at sunrise
- Eponym: Adrien M. Legendre

Legendre is a lunar impact crater that is located near the eastern limb of the Moon. Just to the southwest is the crater Adams. To the northwest is Palitzsch and the prominent Petavius.

The rim of Legendre is worn and eroded, with many small craterlets along the rim and the sides of the outer wall. A small crater approximately 25 kilometers in diameter lies across the southern rim. There is also a narrow gap in the northeast rim that provides a valley leading into the interior. The crater floor is relatively flat, but is marked by multiple small craterlets.

== Satellite craters ==
By convention these features are identified on lunar maps by placing the letter on the side of the crater midpoint that is closest to Legendre.

Legendre	Coordinates	Diameter, km
D	31.60°S 75.15°E	58
E	33.86°S 78.57°E	26
F	33.66°S 76.12°E	40
G	32.23°S 73.92°E	17
H	32.44°S 78.17°E	8
J	30.63°S 74.10°E	12
K	29.79°S 72.21°E	92
L	28.12°S 73.50°E	31
M	28.17°S 71.61°E	10
N	27.47°S 70.50°E	6
P	27.31°S 69.28°E	7
