= Biot (crater) =

Crater on the Moon

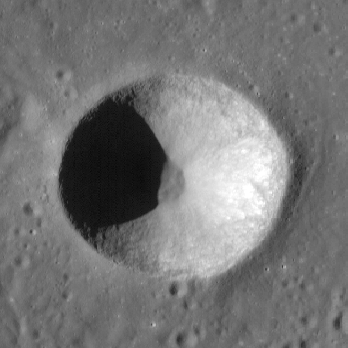
- Photo by Lunar Reconnaissance Orbiter
- Coordinates: 22.7°S 51.1°E
- Diameter: 13.01 km (8.08 mi)
- Depth: 1.5 km (0.93 mi)
- Colongitude: 309° at sunrise
- Eponym: Jean-Baptiste Biot

Biot is a small, bowl-shaped lunar impact crater located in the southern reaches of the Mare Fecunditatis. It lies between Santbech crater to the west and Petavius in the east. The crater Wrottesley lies to the southeast.

This is a fresh crater with a circular form and a sharp-edged rim that has not been significantly degraded. The inner walls slope down to a relatively small interior floor, with a distinct morphological break where they meet. The albedo of the wide inner walls is higher than the surrounding lunar mare, giving it a light hue. A delicate rift runs from the south wall toward Petavius.

This crater is named after French astronomer Jean-Baptiste Biot (1774-1862). The name was incorporated into lunar nomenclature by the German astronomer Johann Mädler during the 19th century. Its designation was officially adopted by the International Astronomical Union in 1935.

== Satellite craters ==
By convention, these features are identified on lunar maps by placing the letter on the side of the crater midpoint that is closest to Biot.

Biot	Latitude	Longitude	Diameter
A	22.2° S	48.9° E	15 km
B	20.4° S	49.6° E	28 km
C	22.0° S	51.1° E	8 km
D	24.3° S	50.3° E	9 km
E	24.6° S	50.9° E	8 km
T	21.4° S	49.9° E	5 km

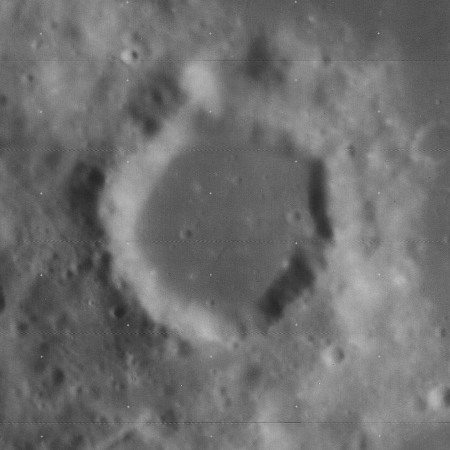
Biot B crater
