= Von Hase =

von Hase is a surname, and may refer to:

- Karl Hase (Karl August von Hase) (1800–1890), German Protestant theologian and church historian
- Karl-Günther von Hase (1917–2021), German diplomat a
- Paul von Hase (1885–1944), German soldier and resistance figure
- Raimar von Hase (born 1948), Namibian farmer

== See also ==
- Hase (surname)
