= Wrottesley (crater) =

Crater on the Moon

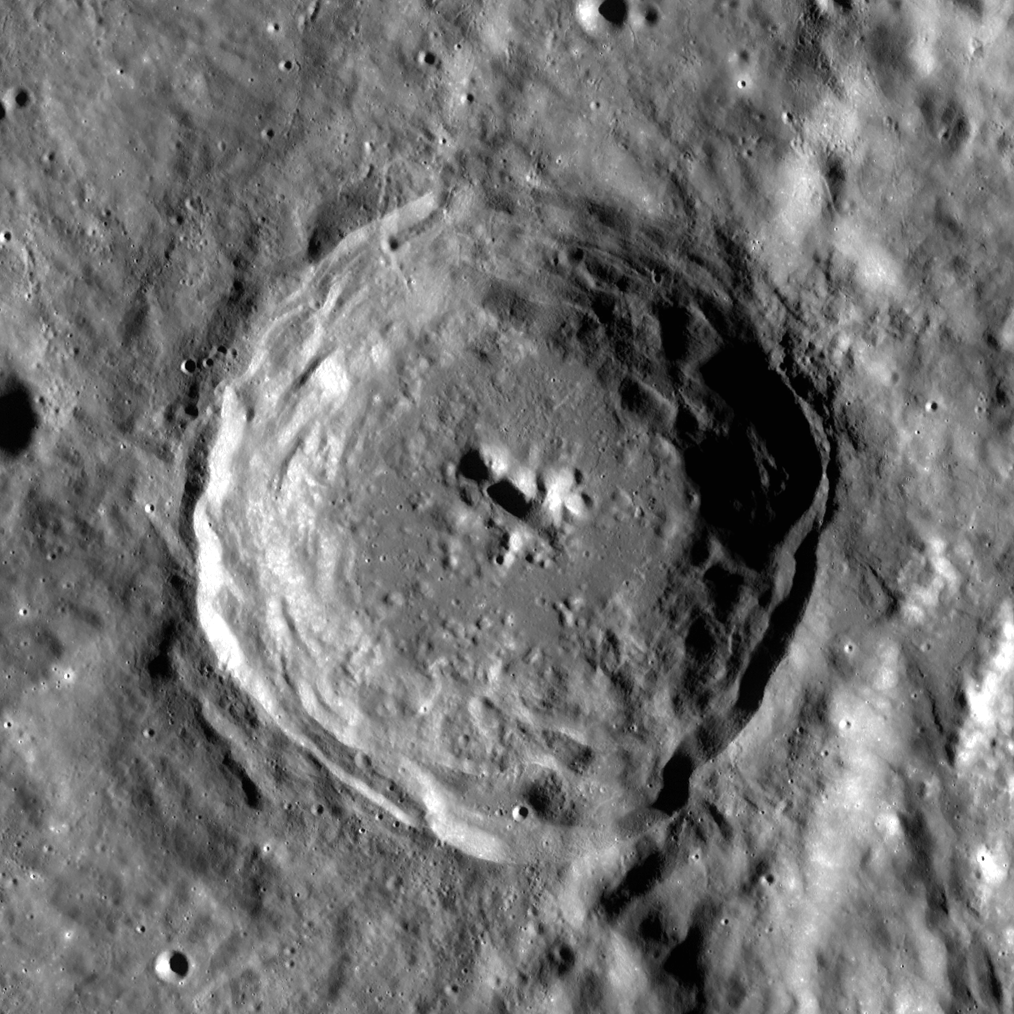
- Lunar Reconnaissance Orbiter image
- Coordinates: 23.9°S 56.8°E
- Diameter: 57 km
- Depth: 2.3 km
- Colongitude: 304° at sunrise
- Eponym: John Wrottesley

Wrottesley is a lunar impact crater that is attached to the west-northwestern rim of the larger crater Petavius, and lies along the southeast edge of Mare Fecunditatis. It lies in the southeast part of the moon and appears somewhat foreshortened when viewed from the earth.

This crater is generally circular in shape, with a slight outward bulge to the south and a system of terraces lining the inner walls. The outer wall has a moderate rampart which merges with that of the neighboring Petavius along the southeastern half. The interior floor is nearly level, except for a central peak formation that rises at the midpoint of the interior.

== Satellite craters ==
By convention these features are identified on lunar maps by placing the letter on the side of the crater midpoint that is closest to Wrottesley.

Wrottesley	Latitude	Longitude	Diameter
A	23.5° S	54.9° E	10 km
B	24.8° S	56.7° E	10 km
