= Gelitin =

Austrian art collective

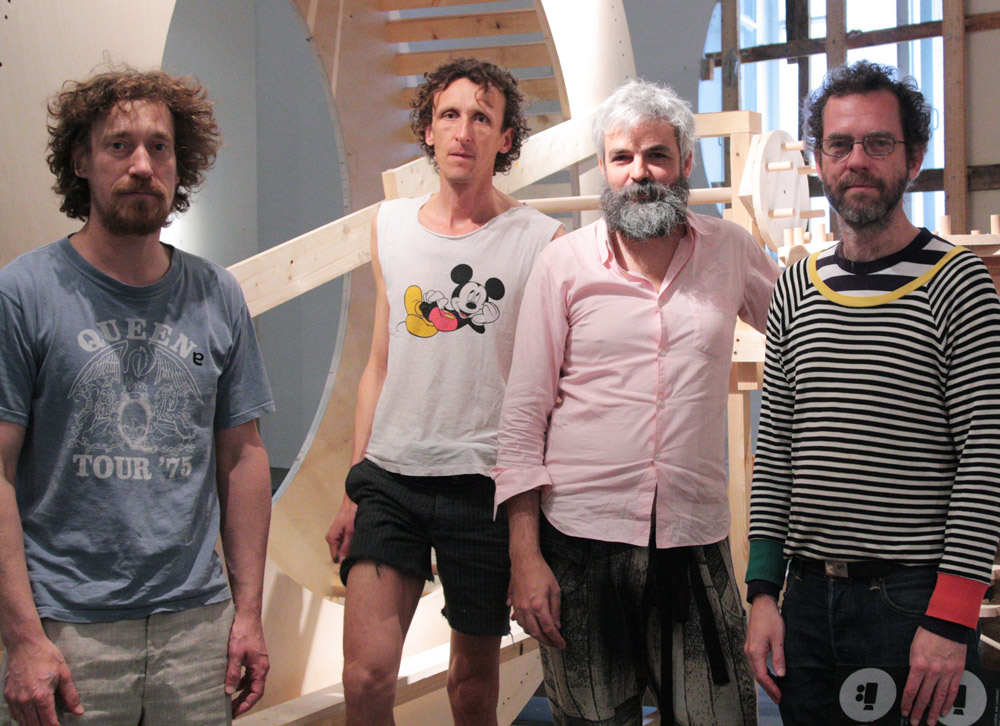
Gelitin in 2014. From left to right: Wolfgang Gantner, Florian Reither, Ali Janka and Tobias Urban

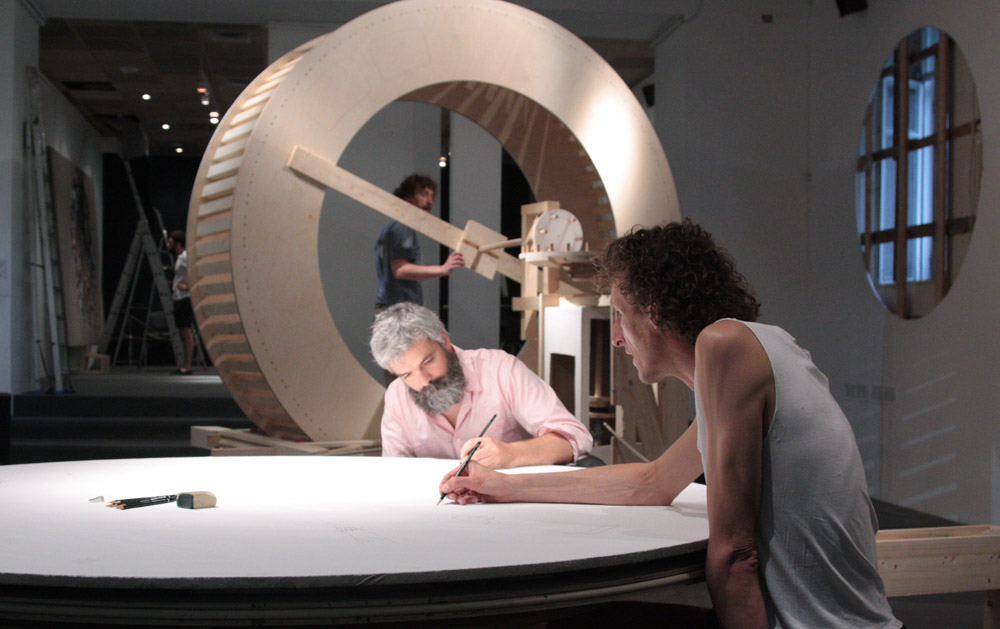
Artists at work on a 2014 project in Moscow

Gelitin (stylized in lowercase as gelitin) is an Austrian artist collective formed in Vienna. The group was formerly known as Gelatin, and changed their name in 2005. They are known for creating art events in the tradition of relational aesthetics, often with a sense of humor.

== Works ==
One of Gelitin's best known art projects occurred in March 2000. During a six-month lease in a vacant space at the 91st floor of the World Trade Center's North Tower (WTC1), where the lease was secured through a Lower Manhattan Cultural Council program for resident artists, the group of four (then known as Gelatin) removed one of the windows on the same floor and installed, temporarily, a narrow balcony made of secured wooden panels. For a while, a helicopter chartered by the crew flew around the building, taking photographs of the jutting balcony for their upcoming book, The B-Thing, which takes the name of the art project itself. The balcony stood for 19 minutes before being dismantled and the glass pane restored. The book was published in July 2001 and had even, by that time, taken on an air of urban legend.

The floor on which the project was conducted, the 91st, was the topmost one from which anyone could have escaped after American Airlines Flight 11 had struck the North Tower. No one from floor 92nd and upwards survived.

Another of their projects is a gigantic plush toy: a 55-metre (180 ft) reclining pink Bunny installed on Colletto Fava (near Genoa, Italy), intended to remain there until 2025.

In November 2005, the group had a show at Leo Koenig, Inc. in New York, a project called Tantamounter 24/7. The artists called their project a "gigantic, complex and very clever machine", which functioned as a kind of art-copier. The group erected a barrier blocking off one half of the space, locking themselves inside for one week. They asked visitors to insert items that they wanted copied into an opening through the barrier; hand-made copies were later returned through another opening.

Other works include:

- Vorm - Fellows - Attitude (2018) at the Museum Boijmans Van Beuningen, Rotterdam, The Netherlands: giant sculptures of feces, with visitors encouraged to put on costumes representing nude men and women
- Sculpture for a Sculpturepark (2018) a temporary interactive clay pit for visitors to make sculptures, at the Middelheim Open Air Sculpture Museum, Antwerp
- Die Wachauer Nase (2014), a giant nose on the bank of the Danube River, in St. Lorenz (Rossatz-Arnsdorf), Wachau, Austria
- Die Tusovka Runde (2014) in Moscow, Russia
- La Louvre, Paris (2008) at ARC, Musée d'Art Moderne de la Ville de Paris
- Tantamounter 24/7 (2005), a "gigantic, complex and very clever machine" created at Leo Koenig, New York
- Hase / Rabbit / Coniglio (2005), a 55-metre (180 ft) knitted pink rabbit on Colletto Fava
- Zapf de Pipi (2005), a giant icicle of frozen urine as contributed by the visitors at the Moscow Biennale of Contemporary Art
- Otto Volante (2004), a roller coaster inside a gallery in Milan, Italy
- Arc de Triomphe (2003), a 7-metre (23 ft) tall fountain picturing a urinating figure made of 2,000 kilograms (4,400 lb) of plasticine, in Salzburg, Austria
- Armpit (2002), a human elevator of body builders for the Liverpool Biennial
- Schlund (2001), a human scaffolding of fat people at the Bavarian Theatre, Munich, Germany
- Die totale Osmose (2001), a swamp surrounding the Austrian Pavilion at the Venice Biennale
- The B-Thing (2000), a small temporary external balcony outside the 91st floor of the World Trade Center
- Weltwunder (2000), a hidden underwater cave, only accessible by diving through a pipe 5 meters deep, as part of the Expo 2000 in Hannover, Germany
- Percutaneous Delights (1998), temporary courtyard installation at the P.S.1 Contemporary Art Center, New York City, featuring a cooling tower of refrigerators, a climbable tower of cabinetry, and an inflatable transparent swimming pool.
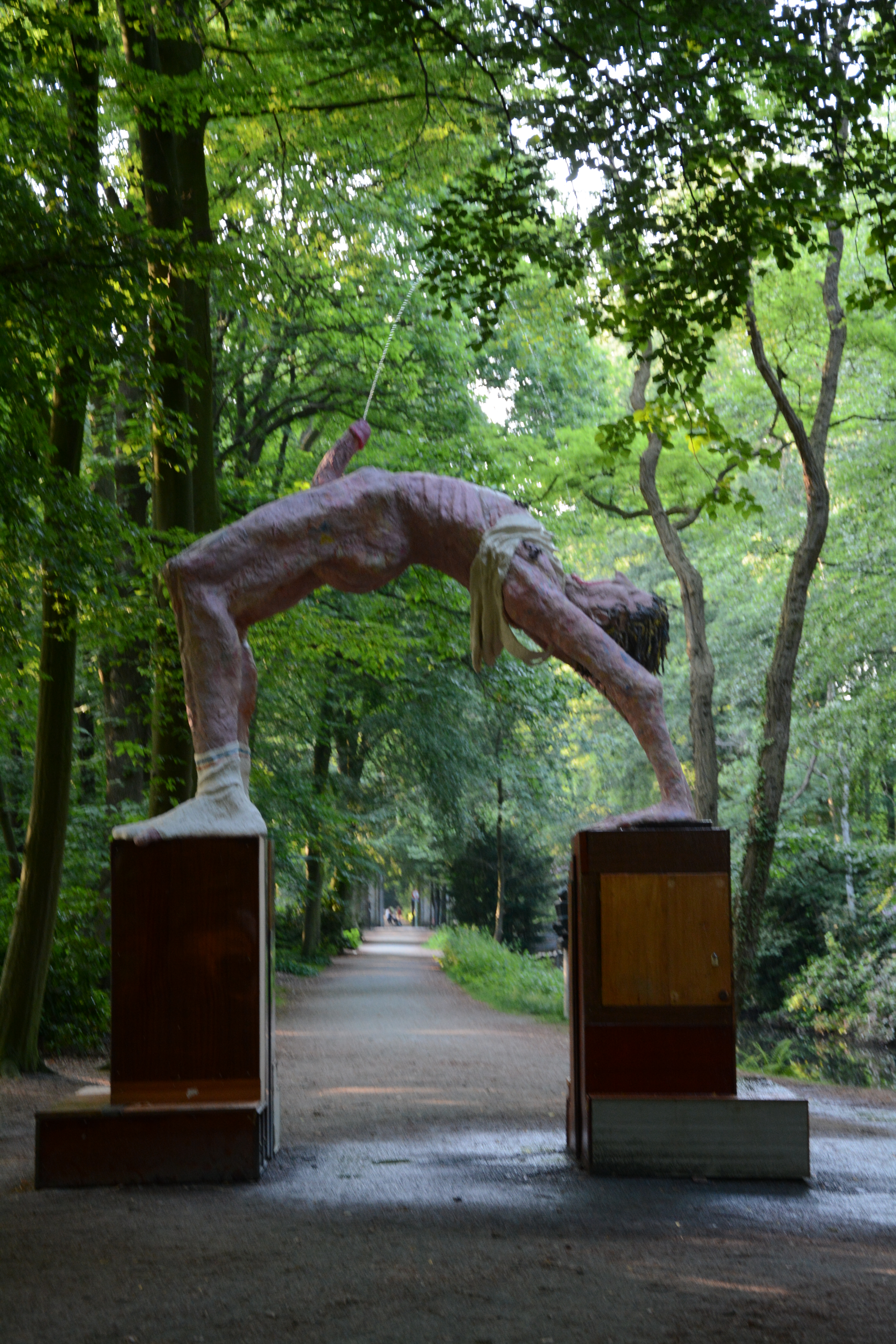
Arc de Triomphe (2003)

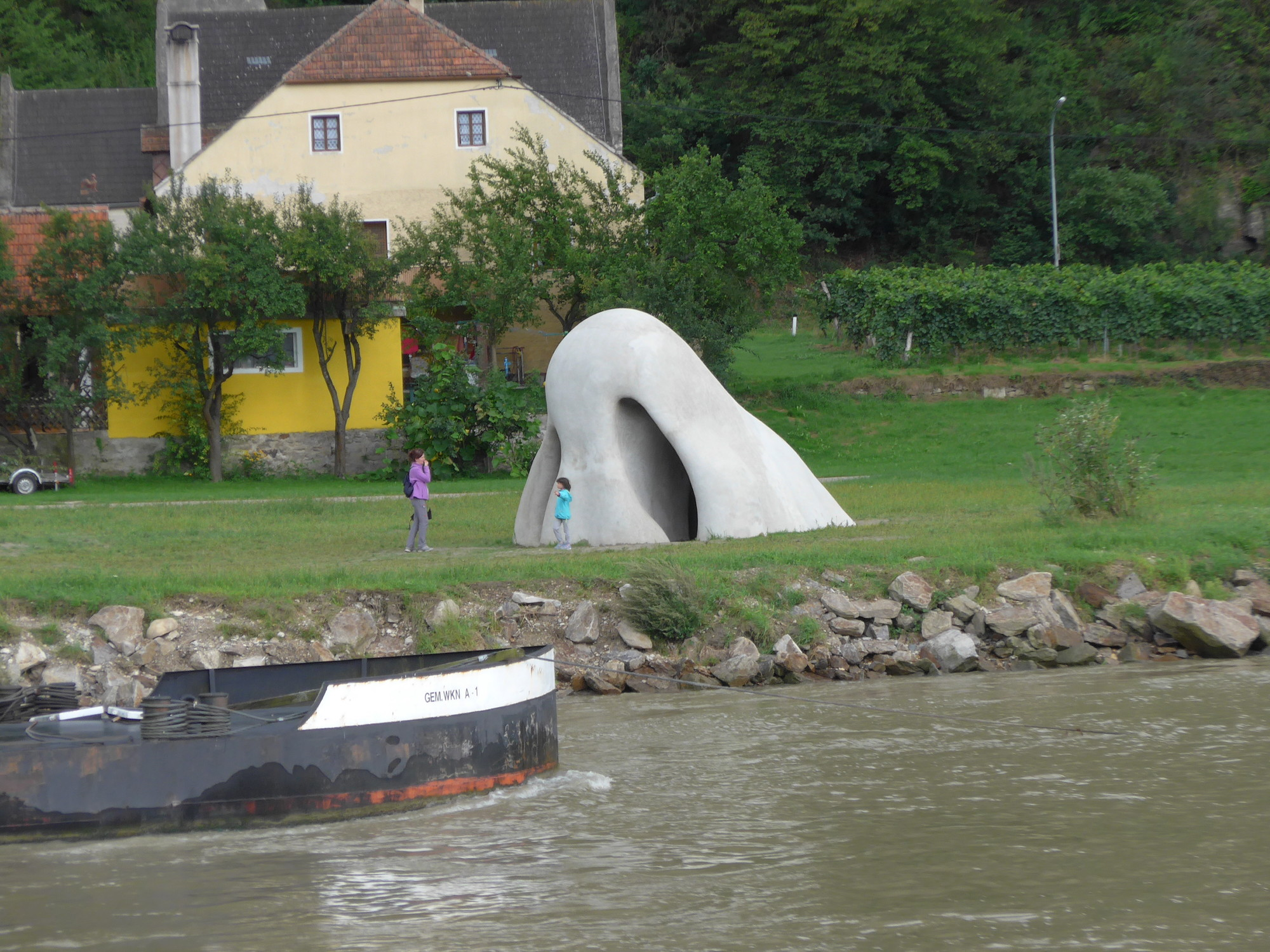
Wachauer-Nase ("Wachauer Nose") (2014)

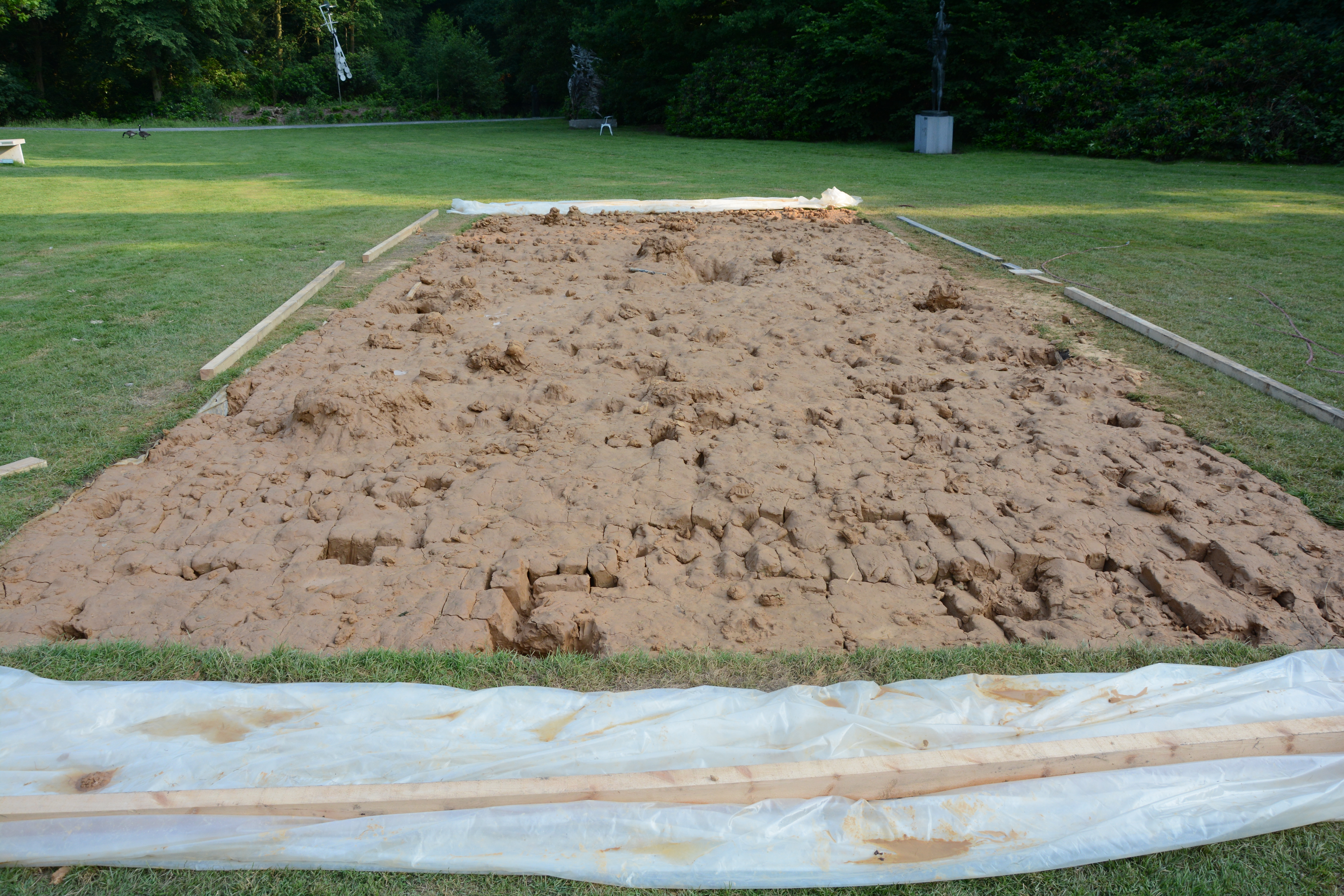
Sculpture for a Sculpturepark (2018), interactive clay pit for visitors

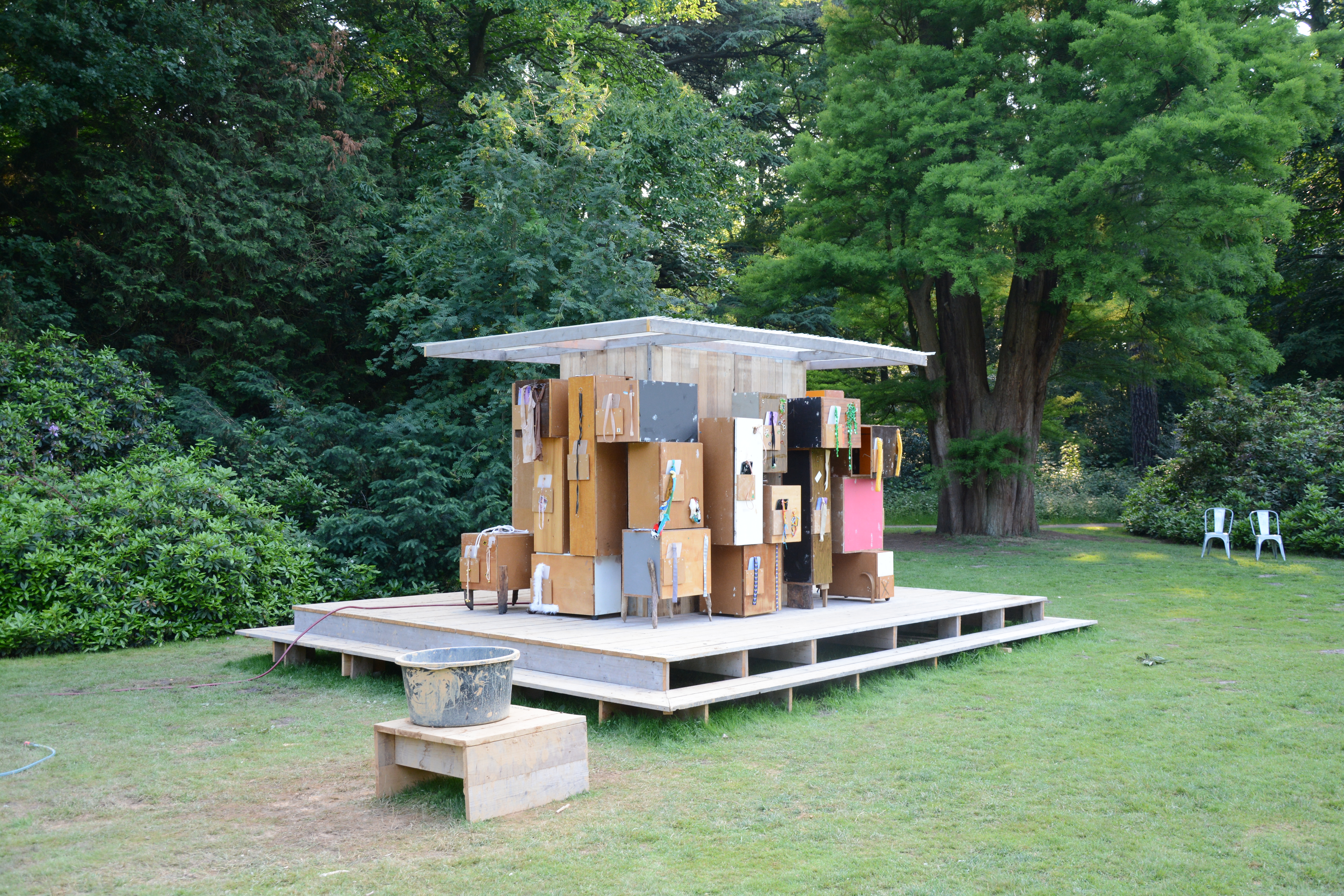
Sculpture for a Sculpturepark (2018), lockers and shower for visitors

== Publications ==
- Gelatin Atlas. Köln: Verlag der Buchhandlung Walther und Franz König. 2022. ISBN 9783753302133.
