= Vallis Palitzsch =

Lunar valley

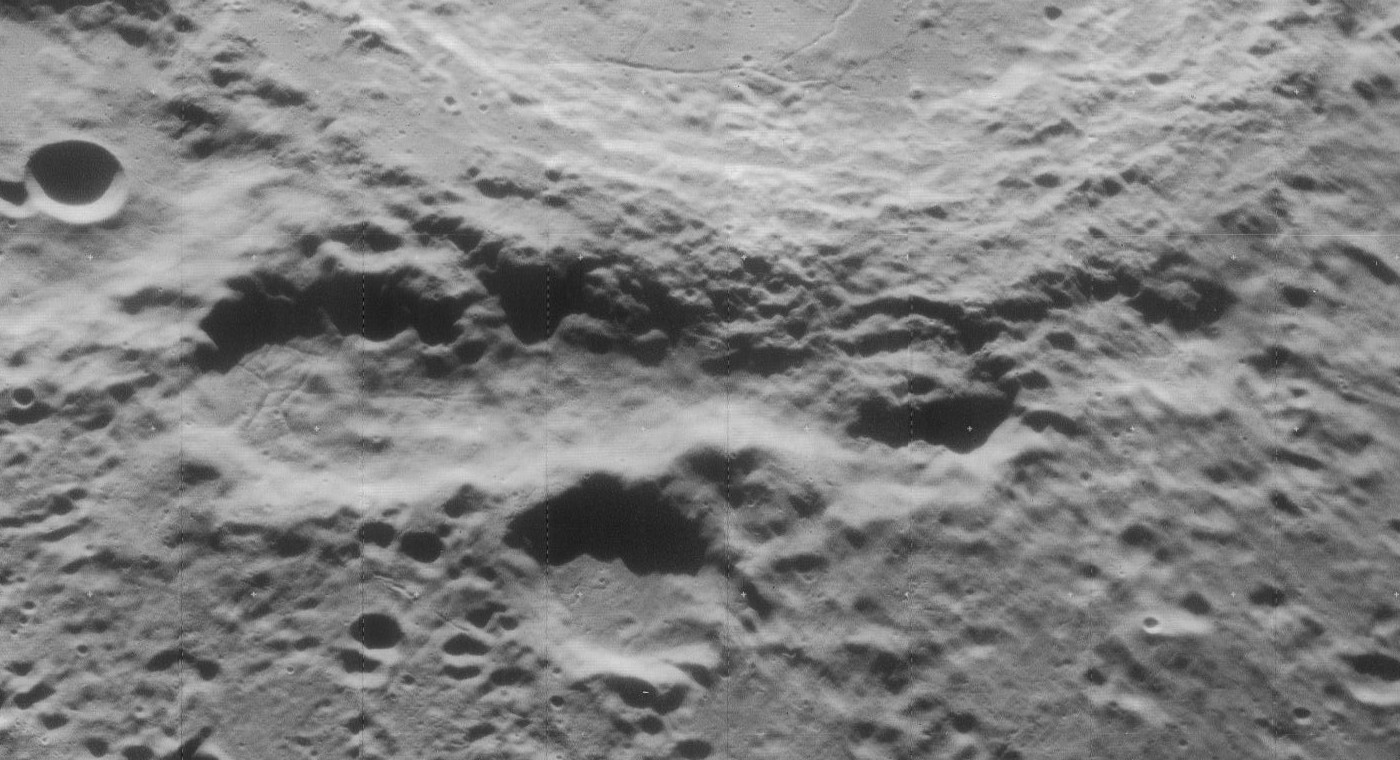
- Oblique view of Palitzsch crater (left), Vallis Palitzsch (center), and the east rim of Petavius (top), facing west.
- Length: 110.5 km (68.7 mi)

Geography
- Coordinates: 26.16°S 64.64°E
- Interactive map of Vallis Palitzsch

The Vallis Palitzsch is a geological structure of the surface of the Moon. The name of the valley was given in 1964 by the International Astronomical Union and comes from the adjacent crater, which in turn was named after the German astronomer Johann Georg Palitzsch (1723–1788).
