= Walter Sydney Adams =

American astronomer (1876–1956)

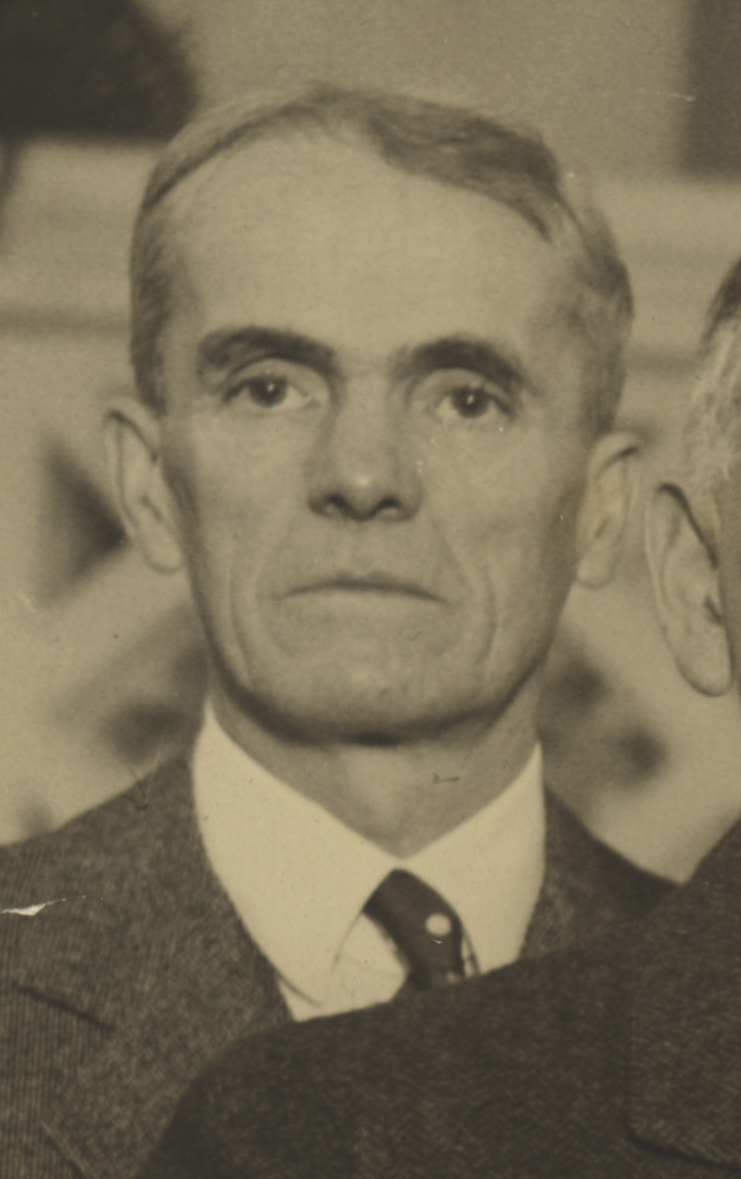
- Adams in 1931
- Born: December 20, 1876; Antioch, Turkey
- Died: May 11, 1956 (aged 79); Pasadena, California, U.S.
- Education: Dartmouth College; University of Chicago
- Awards: Gold Medal of the Royal Astronomical Society (1917); Henry Draper Medal (1918); Valz Prize (1923); Bruce Medal (1928); ForMemRS (1950)
- Scientific career
- Fields: Astronomy
- Workplaces: Mount Wilson Observatory; Yerkes Observatory

Walter Sydney Adams (December 20, 1876 – May 11, 1956) was an American astronomer. He is renowned for his pioneering work in spectroscopy.

== Early life and education ==
Adams was born in Antioch, Ottoman Empire, to Lucien Harper Adams and Nancy Dorrance Francis Adams, missionary parents, and was brought to the U.S. in 1885 He graduated from Dartmouth College in 1898, then continued his education in Chicago and in Germany.

== Career ==
After returning to the U.S., Adams began a career in astronomy and later became the director of the Mount Wilson Observatory.

His primary interest was the study of stellar spectra. He worked on solar spectroscopy and co-discovered a relationship between the relative intensities of certain spectral lines and the absolute magnitude of a star. He was able to demonstrate that spectra could be used to determine whether a star was a giant or a dwarf. In 1915 he began a study of the companion of Sirius and found that despite a size only slightly larger than the Earth, the surface of the star was brighter per unit area than the Sun and it was about as massive. Such a star later came to be known as a white dwarf. In 1925, he reported a gravitational redshift caused by Sirius B; this was regarded as significant confirmation of Albert Einstein's theory of General Relativity. It is now known that his reported measurements were incorrect. Along with Theodore Dunham, he discovered the strong presence of carbon dioxide in the infrared spectrum of Venus.

Adams at the Fourth Conference International Union for Cooperation in Solar Research at Mount Wilson Observatory, 1910

== Awards and honors ==
Awards and honors

- Member of the American Philosophical Society (1915)
- Gold Medal of the Royal Astronomical Society (1917)
- Member of the United States National Academy of Sciences (1917)
- Henry Draper Medal from the National Academy of Sciences (1918)
- Fellow of the American Academy of Arts and Sciences (1922)
- Valz Prize from the French Academy of Sciences (1923)
- Prix Jules Janssen, the highest award of the Société astronomique de France, the French astronomical society (1926)
- Bruce Medal (1928)
- Janssen Medal from the French Academy of Sciences (1934)
- Foreign Member of the Royal Society (ForMemRS) (1950)
- Henry Norris Russell Lectureship (1947)

Named after him

- The asteroid 3145 Walter Adams.
- The crater Adams, a crater on Mars.
- The crater Adams on the Moon is jointly named after him, John Couch Adams and Charles Hitchcock Adams.

== Personal life ==
Adams died at the age of 79 in Pasadena, California.
