= Palitzsch (crater) =

Crater on the Moon

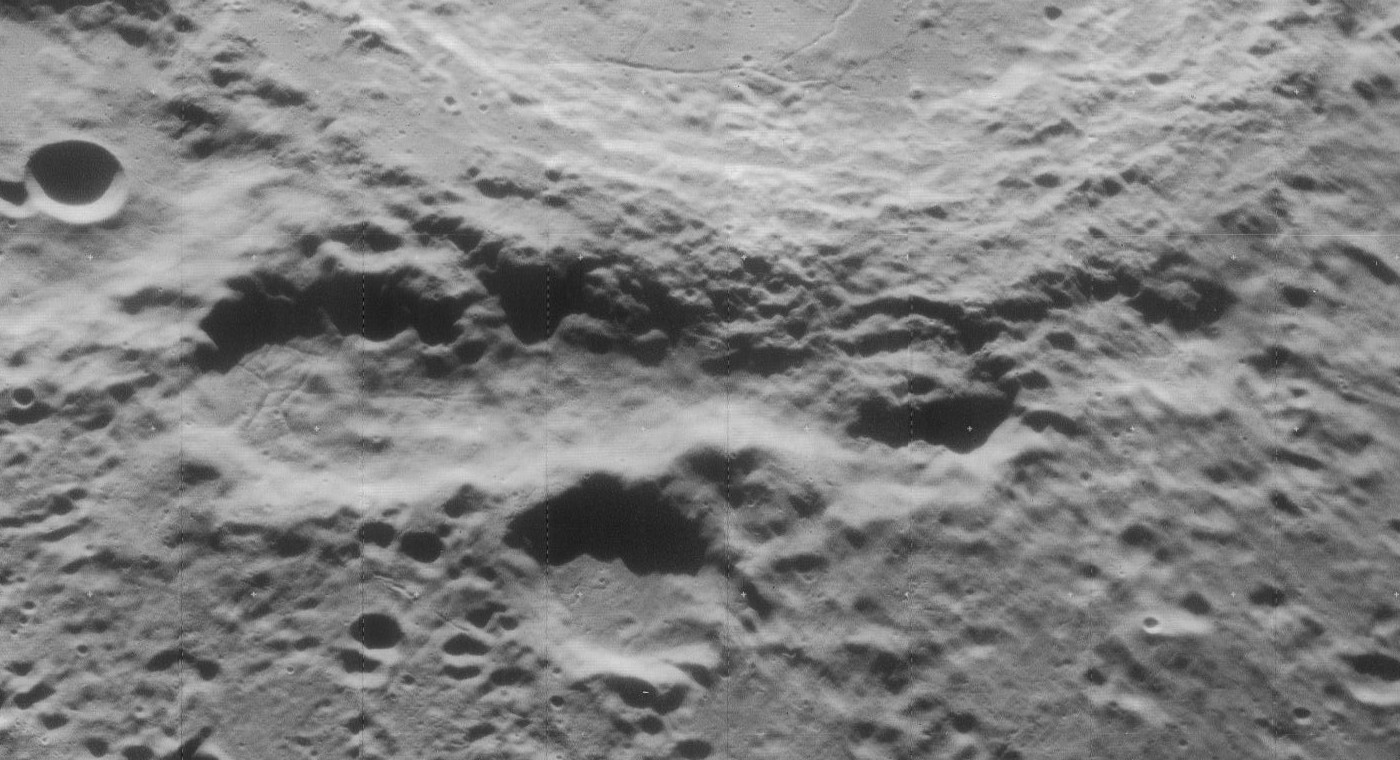
- Oblique Lunar Orbiter 4 image, facing west
- Coordinates: 28.0°S 64.5°E
- Diameter: 41 km
- Depth: Unknown
- Colongitude: 296° at sunrise
- Eponym: Johann G. Palitzsch

Palitzsch is a lunar impact crater that is located in the southeast part of the Moon, near the southeast rim of the crater Petavius. Just to the southwest of Palitzsch is Hase, while to the east-southeast is Legendre.

The northeast rim of Palitzsch forms the southern end of Vallis Palitzsch, a lunar valley that follows the eastern rim of Petavius for a distance of about 110 kilometers. The crater rim is relatively low and inconspicuous, while the floor forms a depression in the surface that follows the contours of the neighboring valley.

== Satellite craters ==
By convention these features are identified on lunar maps by placing the letter on the side of the crater midpoint that is closest to Palitzsch.

Palitzsch	Latitude	Longitude	Diameter
A	26.9° S	65.8° E	31 km
B	26.4° S	68.4° E	39 km

Due to its rays, Palitzsch B is mapped as part of the Copernican System.
