= 1996 Adams =

Stony main-belt asteroid

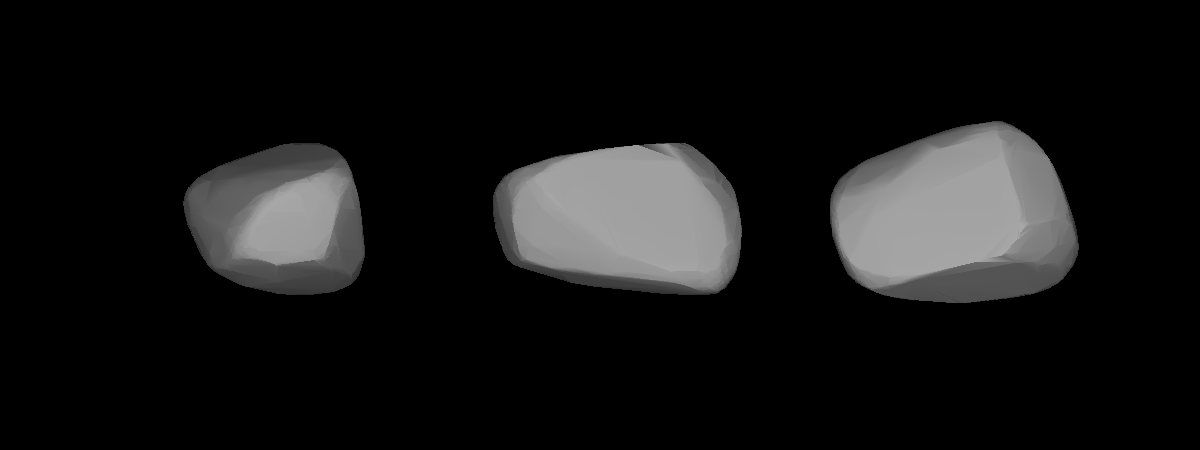
- Lightcurve-based 3D-model of Adams

Discovery
- Discovered by: Indiana University (Indiana Asteroid Program)
- Discovery site: Goethe Link Obs.
- Discovery date: 16 October 1961

Designations
- Named after: John Couch Adams (mathematician)
- Alternative designations: 1961 UA · 1932 RM; 1961 TB_{2} · 1969 TW_{2} 1971 BY_{1} · 1973 SJ_{3}
- Minor planet category: main-belt Eunomia · Maria

Orbital characteristics
- Epoch 4 September 2017 (JD 2458000.5)
- Uncertainty parameter 0
- Observation arc: 55.66 yr (20,331 days)
- Aphelion: 2.9123 AU
- Perihelion: 2.2058 AU
- Semi-major axis: 2.5591 AU
- Eccentricity: 0.1380
- Orbital period (sidereal): 4.09 yr (1,495 days)
- Mean anomaly: 259.97°
- Mean motion: 0° 14^{m} 26.88^{s} / day
- Inclination: 15.132°
- Longitude of ascending node: 1.0923°
- Argument of perihelion: 355.05°

Physical characteristics
- Dimensions: 10.12±0.41 km 12.05±0.44 km 12.417±0.158; 13.529±0.069 km 13.88 km (calculated)
- Synodic rotation period: 3.27±0.02 h 3.311±0.001 h (Note: Mazzone (2011) web: rotation period 3.311±0.001 hours with a brightness amplitude of 0.44 mag. Summary figures for (1996) Adams at Collaborative Asteroid Lightcurve Link (CALL)); 3.31138±0.00006 h 3.316±0.079 h (Note: Aznar (2011) web: web: rotation period 3.316±0.079 hours with a brightness amplitude of 0.6 mag. Summary figures for (1996) Adams at Collaborative Asteroid Lightcurve Link (CALL)) h 3.560 h
- Geometric albedo: 0.1405±0.0118; 0.177±0.014; 0.183±0.053; 0.21 (assumed); 0.395±0.066
- Spectral type: S
- Absolute magnitude (H): 11.6 · 11.06±0.14 · 12.1

1996 Adams, provisional designation 1961 UA, is a stony Eunomia asteroid from the middle region of the asteroid belt, approximately 13 kilometers in diameter. It was discovered on 16 October 1961, by the Indiana Asteroid Program at Goethe Link Observatory near Brooklyn, Indiana, United States. It was later named after mathematician John Couch Adams.

== Classification and orbit ==
The Collaborative Asteroid Lightcurve Link (CALL) classifies Adams as a member of the Eunomia family, a large group of stony S-type asteroid and the most prominent family in the intermediate main-belt. However, based on its concurring orbital elements, Alvarez-Candal from the Universidad Nacional de Córdoba, groups the asteroid into the Maria family, which is named after 170 Maria (also see 9175 Graun).

Adams orbits the Sun in the central main-belt at a distance of 2.2–2.9 AU once every 4 years and 1 month (1,495 days). Its orbit has an eccentricity of 0.14 and an inclination of 15° with respect to the ecliptic. Adams was first identified as 1932 RM at Johannesburg Observatory. It first used observation was a precovery made at the discovering observatory just ten days prior to the official discovery observation.

== Physical characteristics ==
Several rotational lightcurves of Adams were obtained from photometric observations in 2010 and 2012. Best-rated lightcurve analysis gave a rotation period of 3.311 hours with a brightness variation between 0.40 and 0.46 magnitude (U=3/3/3/3). Additional photometric observations gave similar periods of 3.316, 3.27 and 3.560 hours with an amplitude of 0.60, 0.28 and 0.34, respectively (U=2+/1/3).

According to the surveys carried out by the Japanese Akari satellite and NASA's Wide-field Infrared Survey Explorer with its subsequent NEOWISE mission, Adams measures between 10.1 and 13.5 kilometers in diameter and its surface has an albedo between 0.141 and 0.395. The Collaborative Asteroid Lightcurve Link assumes an albedo of 0.21 – derived from 15 Eunomia, the family's largest member and namesake – and calculates a diameter of 13.9 kilometers with an absolute magnitude of 11.6.

== Naming ==
This minor planet was named after John Couch Adams (1819–1892), British mathematician and astronomer, who predicted the existence and position of Neptune, simultaneously with French mathematician Urbain Le Verrier, (also see 1997 Leverrier). The lunar crater Adams is also named in his honour. The official naming citation was published by the Minor Planet Center on 15 October 1977 (M.P.C. 4237).
