= Hase (crater) =

Crater on the Moon

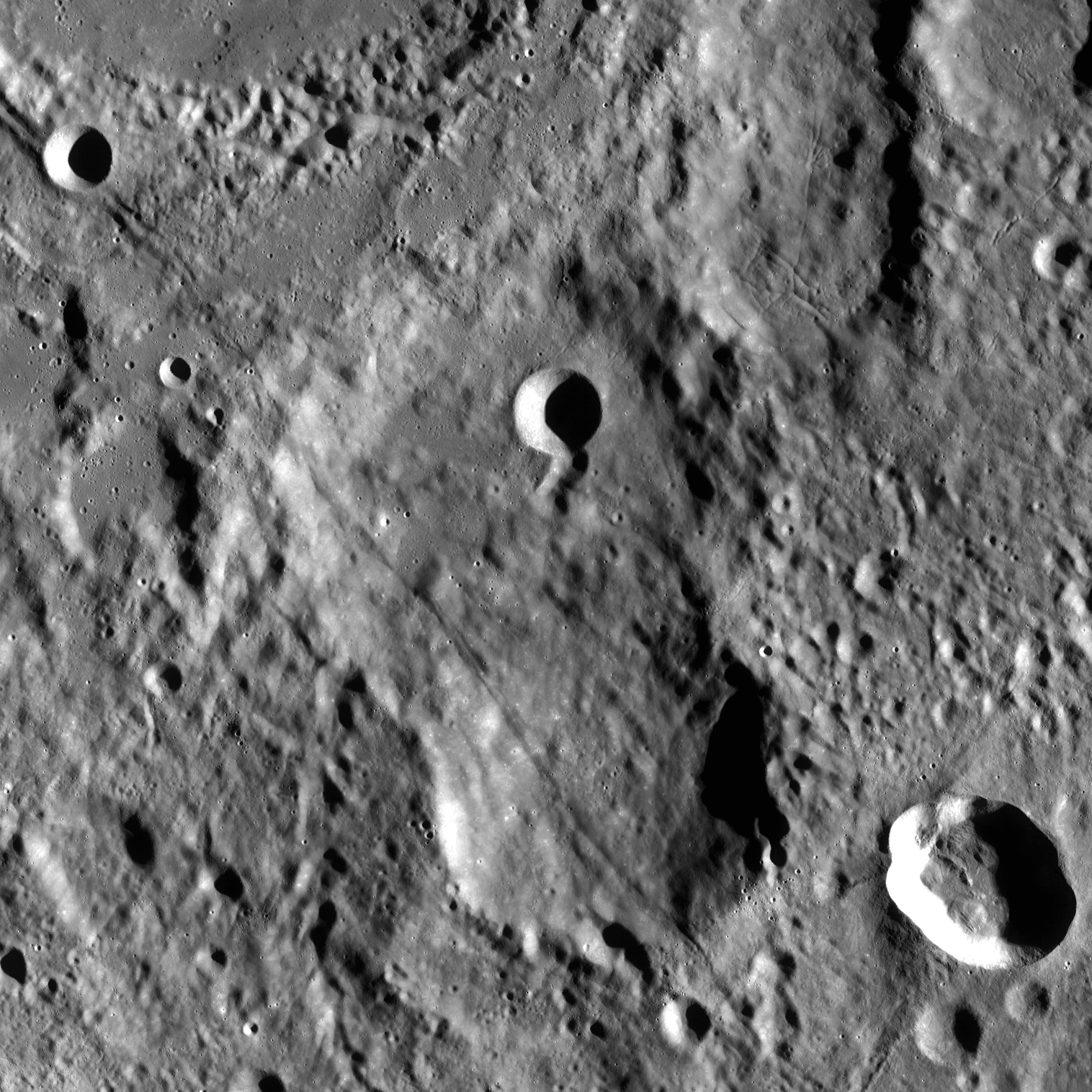
- Craters Hase (upper) and Hase D (lower)
- Coordinates: 29.37°S 62.68°E
- Diameter: 83 km
- Depth: 2.5 km
- Colongitude: 299° at sunrise
- Eponym: Johann M. Hase

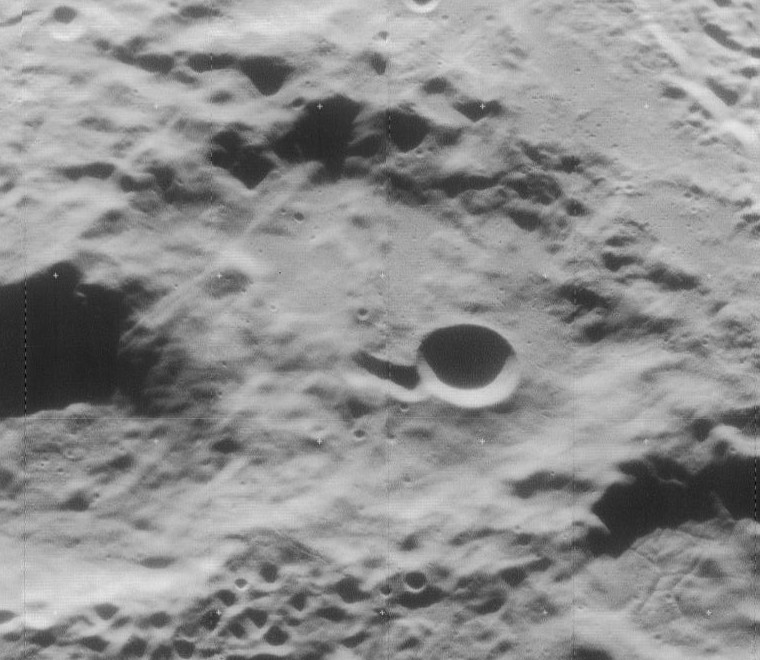
Oblique Lunar Orbiter 4 image, facing west

Hase is a lunar impact crater that is located in the rugged southeast part of the Moon, to the south-southwest of the prominent feature Petavius, a walled plain. Palitzsch and Vallis Palitzsch are attached to the northeastern rim of Hase.

The rim of this crater has been damaged and eroded by a long history of subsequent impacts. The most prominent of these is Hase D, a comparably sized crater that has overlain the southern rim, leaving only a low rim between the two formations. Hase A is a small crater that lies in the interior of Hase, near the irregular northern rim. The remainder of the floor is rough and irregular.

To the southeast of Hase D is a system of linear rilles designated Rimae Hase. Their north-western extension transects western part of Hase and Hase D.

== Satellite craters ==
By convention these features are identified on lunar maps by placing the letter on the side of the crater midpoint that is closest to Hase.

Hase	Coordinates	Diameter, km
A	29.06°S 62.94°E	15
B	31.51°S 60.06°E	20
D	31.11°S 63.30°E	57
