= USS General W. F. Hase =

American military transport ship

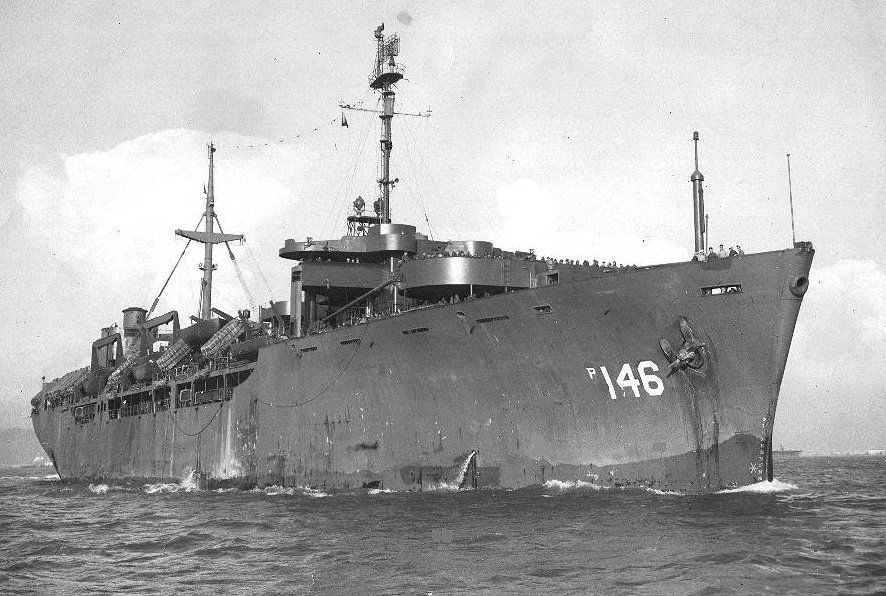
- USS General W. F. Hase (AP-146), date and location unknown.

History

United States
- Name: General W. F. Hase
- Namesake: Major General William Frederick Hase
- Ordered: as a Type C4-S-A1 hull, MC hull 703
- Builder: Kaiser No. 3 Yard, Richmond, California
- Yard number: 10
- Launched: 15 December 1943
- Commissioned: 22 April 1944 (partial)
- Commissioned: 6 June 1944 (full)
- Decommissioned: 6 June 1946
- Identification: Hull symbol: AP-146; Code letters: NJHR
- Fate: Returned to War Shipping Administration (WSA), 6 June 1946; Transferred to the US Army Transportation Service (ATS), 6 June 1946

United States
- Operator: ATS
- In service: 6 June 1946
- Out of service: 1 March 1950
- Identification: Hull symbol: USAT AP-146
- Fate: Returned to Navy, 1 March 1950; Assigned to Military Sea Transportation Service (MSTS)

United States
- Operator: MSTS
- In service: 1 March 1950
- Out of service: July 1954, laid up
- Identification: Hull symbol: T-AP-146
- Honors and awards: 8 × battle stars for Korean War service
- Fate: Returned to the Maritime Administration (MARAD), 8 January 1960, laid up in National Defense Reserve Fleet, Suisun Bay, California; Transferred to Hudson Waterways Corporation, 16 July 1968

United States
- Operator: Hudson Waterways Corporation
- In service: 30 July 1968
- Out of service: 14 October 1974
- Renamed: Transidaho, November 1969
- Fate: Sold to Puerto Rico Maritime Shipping Authority, 14 October 1974

United States
- Name: Transidaho
- Operator: Puerto Rico Maritime Shipping Authority
- In service: 14 October 1974
- Out of service: 10 July 1981
- Renamed: Carolina, 1 March 1975
- Identification: US Official number:
- Fate: Sold to Point Vigilance Corporation, 10 July 1981

United States
- Name: Point Manatee
- Operator: Point Vigilance Corporation
- In service: 10 July 1981
- Out of service: 15 October 1984
- Identification: IMO number: 6904856
- Fate: Sold for scrapping, 15 October 1984

General characteristics
- Class & type: General G. O. Squier-class transport ship
- Displacement: 9,950 long tons (10,110 t) (light); 17,250 long tons (17,530 t) (full)
- Length: 522 ft 10 in (159.36 m)
- Beam: 71 ft 6 in (21.79 m)
- Draft: 24 ft (7.3 m) (mean); 26 ft 6 in (8.08 m)
- Installed power: 2 × Babcock & Wilcox header-type boilers, 465 psi (3,210 kPa) 765 °F (407 °C); 9,000 shp (6,700 kW)
- Propulsion: 1 × Westinghouse geared turbine; 1 × propeller
- Speed: 16.5 kn (30.6 km/h; 19.0 mph)
- Capacity: 1,900 long tons (1,900 t) DWT; 70,000 cu ft (2,000 m^{3}) (non-refrigerated)
- Troops: 228 Officers 5,858 Enlisted
- Complement: 32 Officers 445 Enlisted
- Armament: 4 × 5 in (127 mm)/38 caliber dual purpose gun; 2 × twin 40 mm (1.6 in) Bofors anti-aircraft (AA) gun mounts; 15 × twin 20 mm (0.8 in) Oerlikon cannons AA mounts

USS General W. F. Hase (AP-146) was a General G. O. Squier-class transport ship for the US Navy in World War II. She was named in honor of US Army Major General William Frederick Hase. She was transferred to the US Army as USAT General W. F. Hase in 1946. On 1 March 1950 she was transferred to the Military Sea Transportation Service (MSTS) as USNS General W. F. Hase (T-AP-146). She was later sold for commercial operation in 1968, before being scrapped in 1985.

== Construction ==
General W. F. Hase was launched under a Maritime Commission (MARCOM) contract, MC hull No. 662, 15 December 1943 by the Kaiser Shipbuilding Company's No. 3 Yard, Richmond, California; sponsored by Mrs. John E. Wood Jr.; acquired by the Navy and simultaneously placed in a ferry commission 22 April 1944, during transfer for conversion to a transport by Kaiser's shipyard at Vancouver, Washington; and placed in full commission at Portland, Oregon, 6 June 1944.

== Service history ==
After shakedown out of San Pedro, General W. F. Hase departed San Francisco 15 July 1944, with 3,000 troops and $29 million in military currency. After touching at Pearl Harbor, she debarked the fighting men at Eniwetok, returning to San Francisco 26 August, with 2,100 soldiers. Between 20 September and 1 November, the transport steamed out of Seattle, carrying more than 2,000 troops to Pearl Harbor and 2,800 thence to Manus, Admiralty Islands, before returning to San Francisco with 2,500 veterans of the New Guinea campaign on board. Continuing to support the westward drive of naval forces in the Western Pacific, between 23 November and 20 April 1945, she made two round trips out of San Francisco, shuttling troops to New Guinea and the Philippines and bringing home veterans from New Caledonia and Manus.

During the next 12 months General W. F. Hase made six round-trip voyages, including two circumnavigations of the earth, while deploying troops to and from the United States. Departing San Pedro 9 May, she carried 2,600 troops to Melbourne, Australia, where she arrived 27 May. After steaming to Fremantle, Australia, she reached Calcutta, India, 14 June, and embarked 2,500 homebound soldiers. She then sailed for the United States via Ceylon and the Suez Canal and arrived Norfolk 20 July. She departed Norfolk 5 August for the Mediterranean; and as part of the "Magic Carpet" fleet, she embarked more than 3,000 troops at Marseilles, France, before returning to New York 27 August. Operating out of New York between 1 September and 27 December, she sailed twice to Calcutta and back with more than 6,000 troops. On 11 January 1946, she again departed New York for Calcutta; and, after embarking 2,900 troops 8 February, she steamed via Manila to the West Coast, arriving San Francisco 8 March. Between 1 and 15 April, she carried 1,000 occupation troops to Yokohama, Japan; and on her final "Magic Carpet" voyage she returned 2,800 veterans to Seattle 28 April.

== Decommissioning – transfer to US Army ==
General W. F. Hase steamed to San Francisco 3 to 4 May, decommissioned there 6 June, and, simultaneously, was returned to War Shipping Administration (WSA) for use as a transport by the Army Transportation Service (ATS).

== Transfer to Military Sea Transportation Service ==
She was reacquired by the Navy 1 March 1950, and assigned to duty with Military Sea Transportation Service (MSTS)). Crewed by civilians, she operated out of San Francisco, carrying more than 75,000 troops and their combat cargo to the Far East in support of the Korean War. Between 1950 and 1953 she made 19 round-trip voyages to Japan and Korea, and she returned to San Francisco from her final Far East deployment 29 August 1953. Towed to San Diego in June 1954, she was placed out of service in reserve in July, and remained inactive until returned to the Maritime Administration (MARAD) 8 January 1960, when she was berthed in the National Defense Reserve Fleet at Suisun Bay, California.

== Merchant service ==
Title was transferred to Hudson Waterways Corporation, 16 July 1968, under the MARAD Exchange program for SS Zephyrhills ex-Seven Pines, and she was delivered to Hudson Waterways Corp. on 30 July 1968. The ship was converted to a container ship by the Maryland Shipbuilding and Drydock Company in 1969 and renamed SS Transidaho, USCG ON 515622, IMO 6904856, in November. Upon completion she began hauling containerized cargo for Seatrain Lines. On 14 October 1974 the ship was sold to the Puerto Rico Maritime Shipping Authority and she was renamed SS Carolina on 1 March 1975. She was resold to the Point Vigilance Corp. on 10 July 1981 and renamed SS Point Manatee. She was sold for scrapping on 15 October 1984 to Goldwiles Texas Inc. and was broken up in Taiwan in 1985.

== Awards ==
General W. F. Hase received eight battle stars for Korean war service.

== Notes ==
Citations

== Bibliography ==
- "General W. F. Hase (AP-146)". Dictionary of American Naval Fighting Ships. Naval History and Heritage Command. 13 July 2015. This article incorporates text from this source, which is in the public domain.
- Colton, Tim (13 October 2010). "Kaiser Permanente No. 3, Richmond CA". ShipbuildingHistory.com. Archived from the original on 12 January 2020.
- "General W. F. Hase (AP-146)". NavSource. 6 September 2013.
- "General W. F. Hase (AP-146)". Maritime Administration, US Department of Transportation. Archived from the original on 28 June 2017.
- Sawyer, L. A.; Mitchell, W. H. (1981). From America to United States, Part 2. World Ship Society. ISBN 0-905617-12-6.
- Williams, Greg H. (2013). World War II U.S. Navy Vessels in Private Hands. McFarland Books. ISBN 978-0-7864-6645-0.
