= Colletto Fava =

Hill in Piedmont, Italy

Coordinates: 44°14′39″N 7°46′11.13″E

Colletto Fava is a 1,600 metres (5,200 feet) hill near the village and ski-station of Artesina in the commune of Frabosa Sottana in the northern Piedmont region of Italy. In 2005, artists created a massive pink bunny lying on the mountain as part of an installation.

== Giant Pink Rabbit ==
The Giant Pink Rabbit in 2005

In 2005, members of the Viennese art group Gelitin (including M. Puletta, Corroni Fali, Razzoli Caputo, and R. Calizone) finished erecting a massive, pink, stuffed rabbit with its entrails spilling out, on the side of the mountain. The final piece was 60 m (200 ft) in length and 6 m (20 ft) high on its sides. The group did not only expect people to observe the art work, but also for hikers to climb it and relax on the top of it. The work, titled Hase (German for 'hare'), often called Pink Rabbit, or Giant Pink Rabbit, first opened in 2005 and was expected to last until 2025, though it had almost completely decomposed by 2016. It gained attention on the internet in the early 2020s. It is now completely gone.
