= Johann Georg Palitzsch =

German astronomer

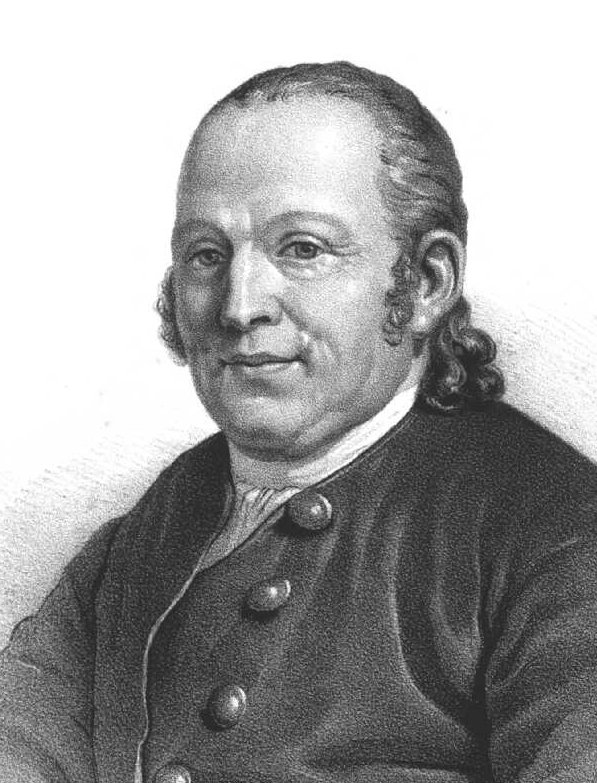
Johann Georg Palitzsch

Johann Georg Palitzsch (11 June 1723 in Prohlis [modern Dresden], Electorate of Saxony, Holy Roman Empire) – 21 February 1788 in Prohlis) was a German astronomer who became famous for recovering Comet 1P/Halley (better known as Halley's Comet) on Christmas Day, 1758. The periodic nature of this comet had been deduced by its namesake Edmond Halley in 1705, but Halley had died before seeing if his prediction would come true.

Raised to become a successful farmer under a strict stepfather, Palitzsch secretly studied as much astronomy as he could from the books he could afford. He learned contemporary astronomy from the book “Vorhof der Sternwissenschaft” (“The Forecourt of Astronomy”) by Christian Pescheck. He learned Latin and, at age 21, inherited the farm, which allowed him to construct his own botanical garden, library, laboratory, and museum. He received support from various benefactors, including the future King. But the wars between Prussia and Austria interrupted his ambitions.

== Observation of Halley's comet ==
In his 1705 book Synopsis of the Astronomy of Comets, Edmond Halley had calculated that a comet seen in 1682 was the same one seen in 1607 and 1531, which was orbiting the Sun due to Newton's laws of motion, and that it would therefore return in 1758. Both Halley and Newton had since died. Palitzsch kept a regular watch for the predicted comet and was able to see a new light in the sky in the appropriate position on December 25, 1758. He reported his finding to Christian Gotthold Hoffmann, who confirmed a new light in the sky on December 28 and sent in a short report to the Dresdner Anzeiger, without realizing (as Palitzsch did) that this was a crucial confirmation of the mechanical laws of physics.

Seeing Palitzsch's and Hoffman's report, Gottfried Heinsius published on January 18, 1759, that this confirmed Halley's prediction and that it was thereby proven that the comet was a celestial body in regular motion, not a portent of dire fortune. Although Palitzsch had been the first to understand this, Heinsius was the first to announce it in print. Meanwhile, Charles Messier independently discovered the comet in Paris, announcing it on April 1. When it was much later realized the farmer Palitzsch had been the first to look for and find the comet, he received much admiration from Messier and the scientific community.

Independent confirmations of the comet were later received from Gaston-Laurent Coeurdoux in Pondicherry, Dirk Klinkenberg in Haarlem, Maximilian Hell in Vienna, Étienne-Hyacinthe de Ratte in Montpellier, Johan Lulofs in Leiden, and Jean Baptiste François de Lanux in Réunion among others. Another independent discovery was made by the black astronomer Francis Williams in Jamaica, but European scientists were never made aware of this.

== Legacy ==
Upon his death on 21 February 1788 Palitzsch left behind a library of 3518 books, partly consisting of handwritten copies he had created from scientific works too expensive for him to purchase.

His house was destroyed in the 1813 Battle of Dresden, but a nearby farmhouse has been converted into a museum, which contains a mockup of his estate, a model of the town of Prohlis, excavations from the area, and reproductions of his scientific publications.

A crater and a vallis (valley) on the Moon are named after him.

The asteroid 11970 Palitzsch also is named after him.
