= William Frederick Hase =

United States Army general (1874–1935)

William F. Hase
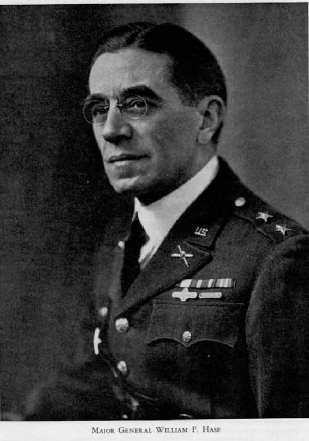
- Born: August 31, 1874; Milwaukee, Wisconsin, US
- Died: January 20, 1935 (aged 60)
- Burial place: Arlington National Cemetery
- Military career
- Allegiance: United States
- Branch: United States Army
- Service years: 1898–1935
- Rank: Major general
- Conflicts: World War I
- Awards: Distinguished Service Medal

William Frederick Hase (August 31, 1874 – January 20, 1935) was a major general in the United States Army.

== Biography ==
Hase was born on August 31, 1874, in Milwaukee, Wisconsin. Later he attended the University of Wisconsin-Madison. He married two times. First to Daisy Sames, who died on August 14, 1903. Second to Pearl Newman, who died on March 27, 1941. On January 20, 1935, Hase died in Washington, D.C. He, along with both Daisy and Pearl, is buried at Arlington National Cemetery.

== Career ==
Hase joined the Army in 1898 and served in the Coast Artillery Corps. During World War I he served in France. He received the Army Distinguished Service Medal for his service during the war. Following the war Hase served in various locations throughout the United States until being named Chief of the Coast Artillery Corps in 1934, succeeding John W. Gulick. Hase served as Chief until his death and was succeeded by Harry L. Steele.

The United States Navy vessel USS General W. F. Hase (AP-146) was named for him.
