= Johann Matthias Hase =

German mathematician, astronomer and cartographer

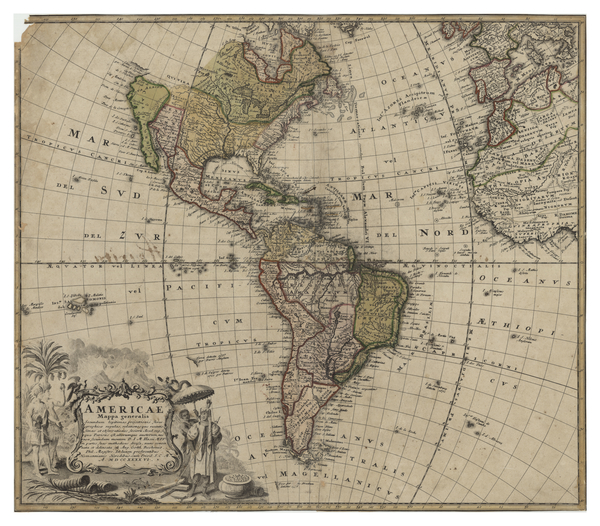
Americae mappa generalis secundum legitimas projectionis stereographicae regulas (1746)

Johann Matthias (Matyhias) Hase (Haas, Haase) (anglicised as Johannes Hasius) (14 January 1684 – 24 September 1742) was a German mathematician, astronomer, and cartographer.

== Biography ==
Hase taught at Leipzig and his native Augsburg. In 1720, he became professor of mathematics at the University of Wittenberg.

Hase made maps for the publishing firm of Homännische Erben ("Homännis' Heirs"), such as the following:

- A map of Africa, Africa Secundum legitimas Projectionis Stereographiae regulas (1737) which itself was based on the maps developed by Leo Africanus

Map of Africa based on works of Leo Africanus detailing political demarcations of the African continent as known by Leo Africanus as of 1550.

- Kingdoms of David and Solomon (1739). At Nuremberg, Hase published his Regni Davidici et Salomonaei descriptio geographica et historica, una cum delineatione Syriae et Aegypti pro statu temporum sub Seleucidis et Lagidis regibus mappis luculentis exhibita, et probationibus idoneis instructa. Juncta est huic operi consideratio urbium maximarum veterum et recentiorum, ac operum quorundam apud antiquos celebrium. This work, as a historical survey of the kingdoms of David and Solomon, as well as of the dominions of the Seleucids, included maps of Syria and Egypt .
- Europa secundum legitimas projectionis stereographieae regulas (1743). It depicts Europe.
- Asia secundum legitimas projectionis stereographieae regulas (1744). It shows Asia.

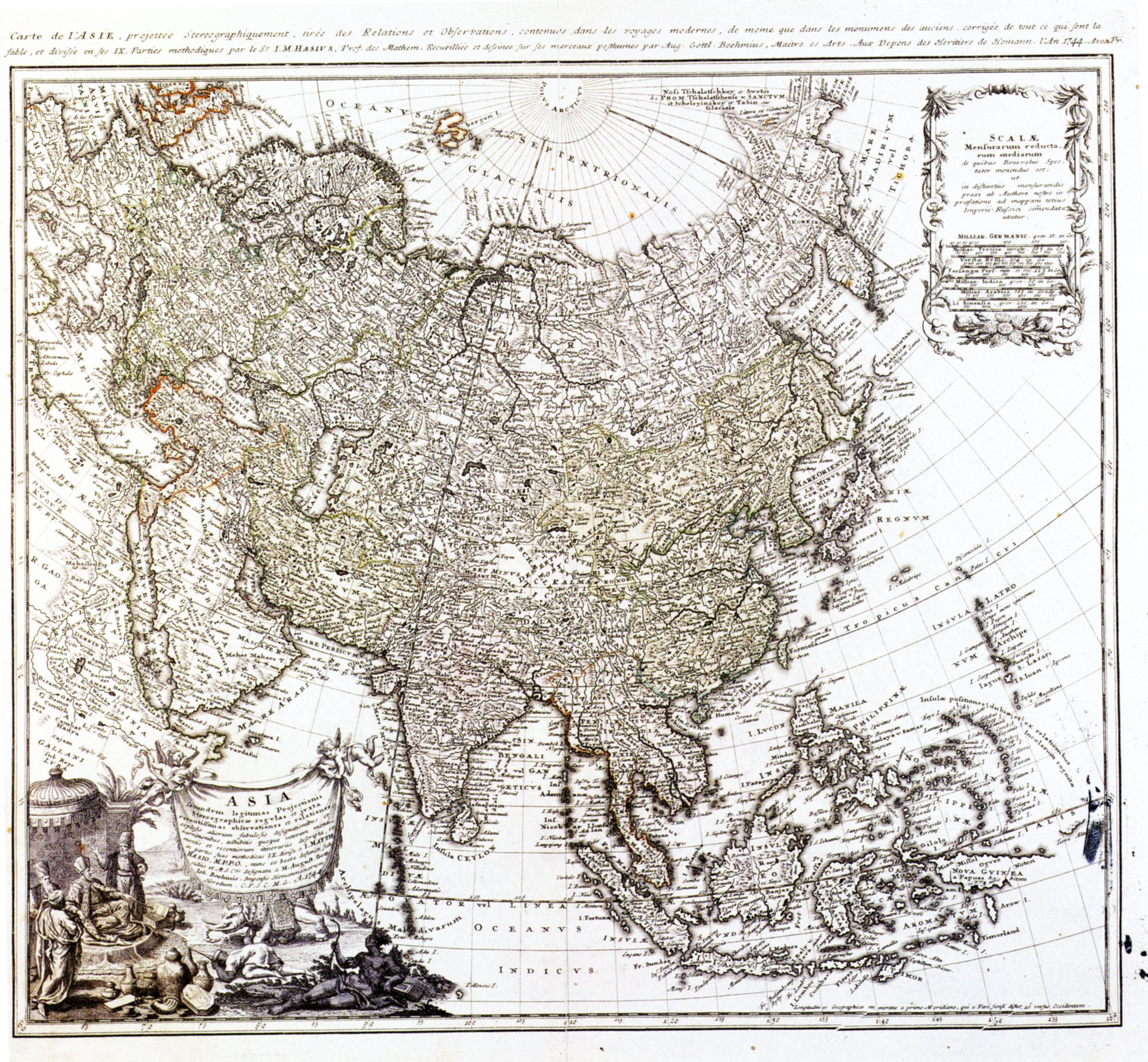
Map of Asia, Johann Matthias Hase, National Palace Museum, Taipei

- Hungariae ampliori significatu et veteris vel Methodicae complexae Regna (1744), published at Nuremberg. It shows the Kingdom of Hungary, as well as countries along the Danube and in Southeast Europe.

Hase died in Wittenberg. The crater Hase on the moon is named after him.

== Allegories ==
Hase's primary contribution to the Africa map was adding a cultural explanation through allegorical cartoons, though his role may have been more significant in other maps. On the Africa map, he included a large allegorical scene in the lower corner depicting a finely dressed woman in clothing resembling modern-day attire. The men are shown in servant's clothes, African ruler's garb, or European traders' outfits. Notably, the indigenous African ruler sits on a human used as a stool. The allegory also includes lions, other animals, and elements of life on the continent, similar to the Asia map's allegory.
