= Tomohiro Hase =

Japanese electrical engineer

Tomohiro Hase from Ryukoku University, in Shiga, Japan was the founder and general chair of the first IEEE Global Conference on Consumer Electronics (GCCE) in 2012. Hase was named Fellow of the Institute of Electrical and Electronics Engineers (IEEE) in 2016 for contributions to embedded software for real-time applications.
