= Karl Hase =

German theologian (1800–1890)

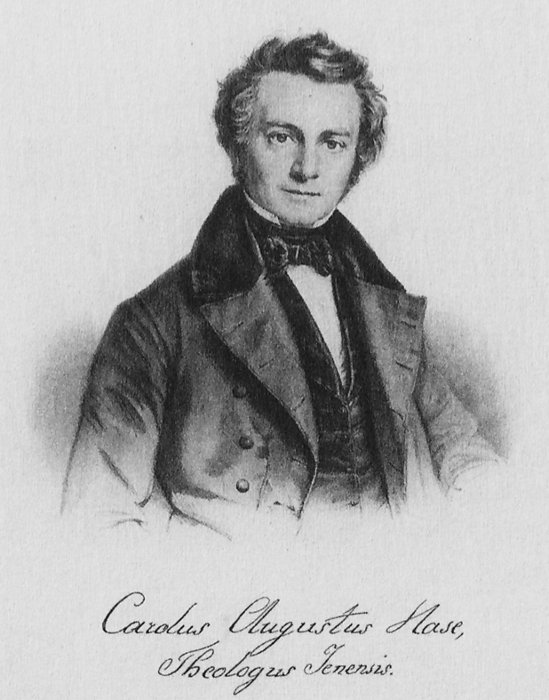
Karl von Hase (ca. 1830–35)

Karl August von Hase (25 August 1800 – 3 January 1890) was a German Protestant theologian and church historian.

== Background ==
He was born at Steinbach (near Penig) in Saxony. He studied at Leipzig and Erlangen, and in 1829 was called to Jena as professor of theology. He retired in 1883 and was made a baron. He was the great-grandfather of Dietrich Bonhoeffer.

Hase's aim was to reconcile modern culture with historical Christianity in a scientific way. But though a liberal theologian, he was no dry rationalist. Indeed, he vigorously attacked rationalism, as distinguished from the rational principle, charging it with being unscientific inasmuch as it ignored the historical significance of Christianity, shut its eyes to individuality and failed to give religious feeling its due.

== Works ==
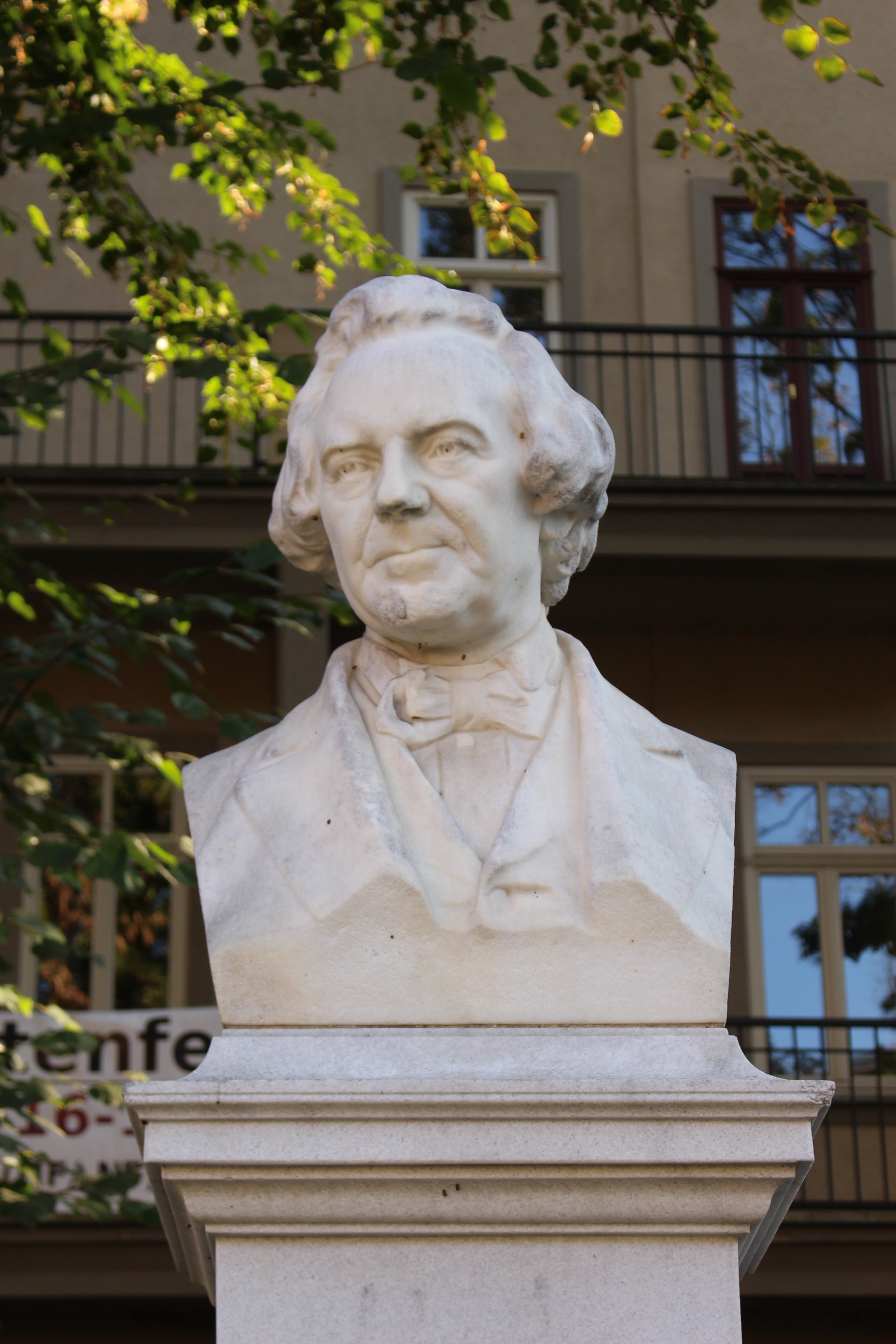
Karl Hase statue in Jena

His views are presented scientifically in his Evangelisch-protestantische Dogmatik (1826; 6th edition, 1870), the value of which "lies partly in the full and judiciously chosen historical materials prefixed to each dogma, and partly in the skill, caution and tact with which the permanent religious significance of various dogmas is discussed" (Otto Pfleiderer). More popular in style is his Gnosis: Oder evangelische Glaubenslehre, für die gebildeten in der Gemeinde, (volume 1, 1827; volume 2, 1828; volume 3, 1829; second edition in two volumes, 1869 & 1870). But his reputation rests chiefly on his treatment of church history in his Kirchengeschichte, Lehrbuch zunächst für akademische Vorlesungen (1834, 12th edition, 1900; English translation, 1870).

His biographical studies, Franz von Assisi (1856; second edition, 1892), Caterina von Siena (1864; second edition, 1892), Neue Propheten (Die Jungfrau von Orleans, Savonarola, Thomas Münzer) are judicious and sympathetic. Other works are:

- Hutterus Redivivus, or, doctrine of the Evangelical Lutheran Church (1827; 12th edition, 1883), a work in which he sought to present the teaching of the Protestant church in such a way as Leonhard Hutter would have reconstructed it, had he still been alive.
- Das Leben Jesu (1829; 5th edition, 1865; English translation, 1860); in an enlarged form, Geschichte Jesu (second edition, 1891).
- Handbuch der protestantischen Polemik gegen die Römisch-katholische Kirche (1862; 7th edition, 1900; English translation, volume 1, volume 2, 1906).

For his life, see his Ideale und Irrtümer (1872; 5th edition, 1894) and Annalen meines Lebens (1891); and for comparison — Otto Pfleiderer, "The development of theology in Germany since Kant" (1890) and Frédéric Lichtenberger, "History of German theology in the nineteenth century" (1889).
