= Petavius (crater) =

Lunar impact crater

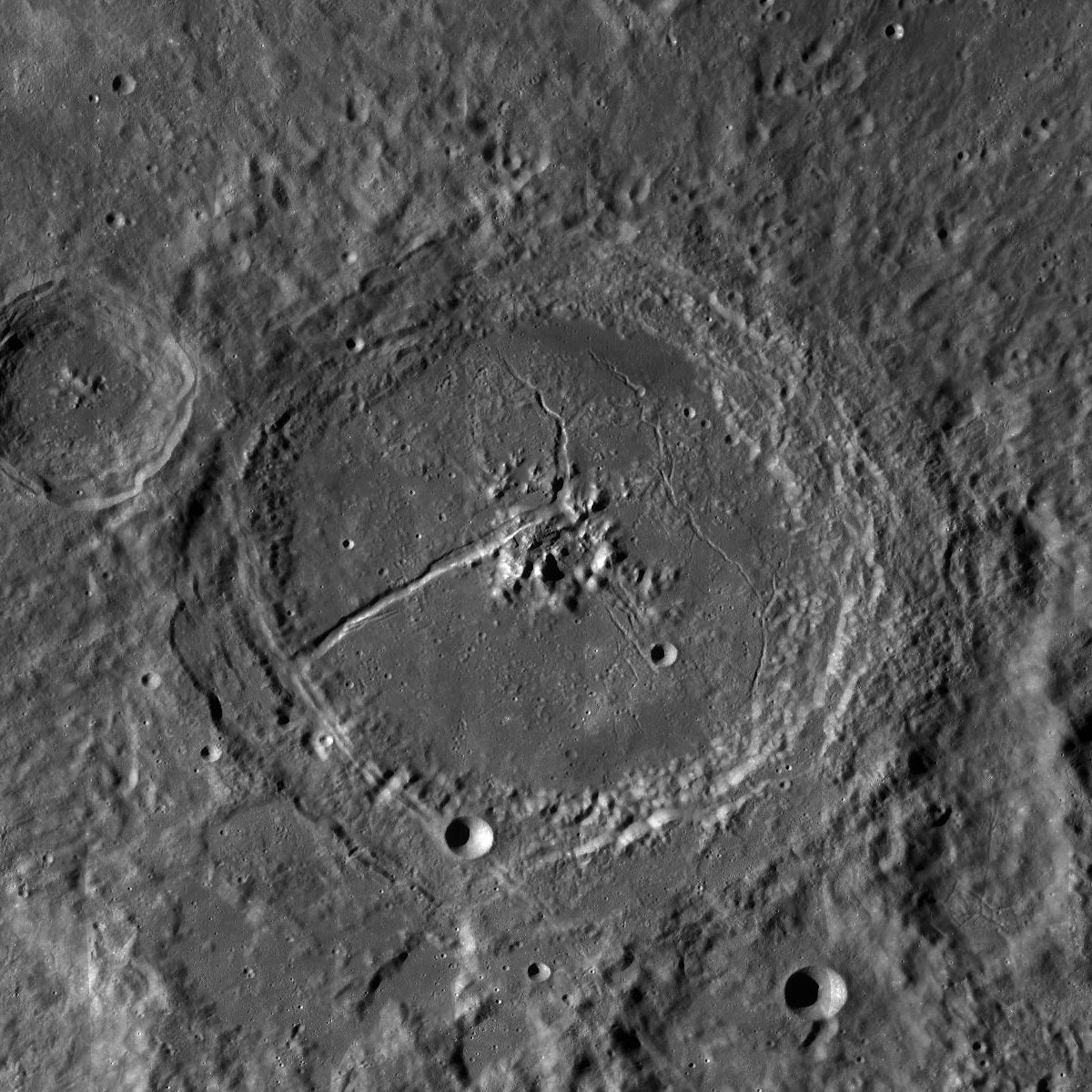
- LRO mosaic
- Coordinates: 25.3°S 60.4°E
- Diameter: 177 km
- Depth: 3.4 km
- Colongitude: 300° at sunrise
- Formation: Lower Imbrian
- Eponym: Denis Pétau

Petavius is a large lunar impact crater located to the southeast of the Mare Fecunditatis, near the southeastern lunar limb. Attached to the northwest rim is the smaller crater Wrottesley. To the southeast are Palitzsch, Vallis Palitzsch, and Hase. Farther to the north is the large crater Vendelinus. Petavius appears oblong when viewed from the Earth due to foreshortening. Petavius is Imbrian in age.

== Observations ==
Rev. T. W. Webb described Petavius as,

"one of the finest spots in the Moon: its grand double rampart, on east side nearly 11,000 ft (3,400 m). High, its terraces, and convex interior with central hill and cleft, compose a magnificent landscape in the lunar morning or evening, entirely vanishing beneath a Sun risen but halfway to the meridian."

The most favorable time for viewing this feature through a telescope is when the Moon is only three days old. By the fourth day the crater is nearly devoid of shadow.

On the lunar geologic timescale, Petavius is one of the largest craters of Lower (Early) Imbrian age. The outer wall of Petavius is unusually wide in proportion to the diameter, and displays a double rim along the south and west sides. The height of the rim varies by as much as 50% from the lowest point, and a number of ridges radiate outwards from the rim.

The convex crater floor has been resurfaced by lava flow, and displays a rille system named the Rimae Petavius. The large central mountains are a prominent formation with multiple peaks, climbing 1.7 kilometers above the floor. Anorthosite with a very low mafic abundance has been detected in this rise, and the infrared spectrum of pure crystalline plagioclase has been identified. A deep fracture runs from the peaks toward the southwest rim of the crater.

70-cm radar images of this crater and its surroundings show that the region of the surface beyond the wide outer rampart of Petavius has a dark halo, characteristic of a smooth surface free of boulders. It is thought that this may have been created by radial outbursts during the original impact that swept the area clean.

== Satellite crater Petavius B - Orus ==
Petavius B to the north-northwest of Petavius has a small ray system that lies across the surface of Mare Fecunditatis. Due to these rays, Petavius B is mapped as part of the Copernican System. This raycrater was called Orus by Hugh Percy Wilkins and Patrick Moore. Although this name was not officially recognized by the International Astronomical Union (IAU), it is still seen on older lunar maps such as the Swiss Hallwag moonmap created by Hans Schwarzenbach.

== Satellite craters ==
By convention these features are identified on lunar maps by placing the letter on the side of the crater midpoint that is closest to Petavius.

Petavius	Latitude	Longitude	Diameter
A	26.0° S	61.6° E	5 km
B	19.9° S	57.1° E	33 km
C	27.7° S	60.1° E	11 km
D	24.0° S	64.4° E	17 km

== Views ==
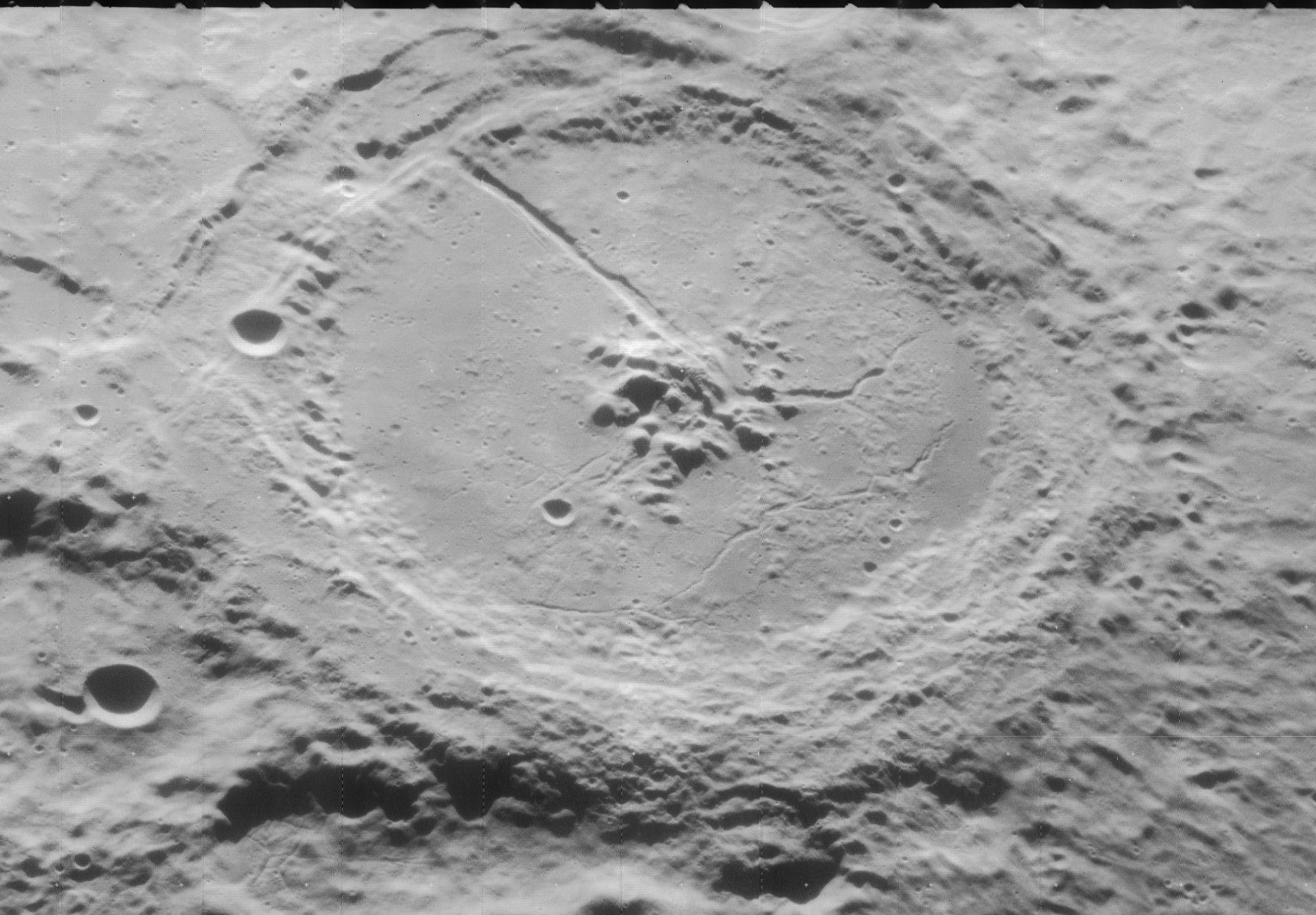
Oblique view from Lunar Orbiter 4

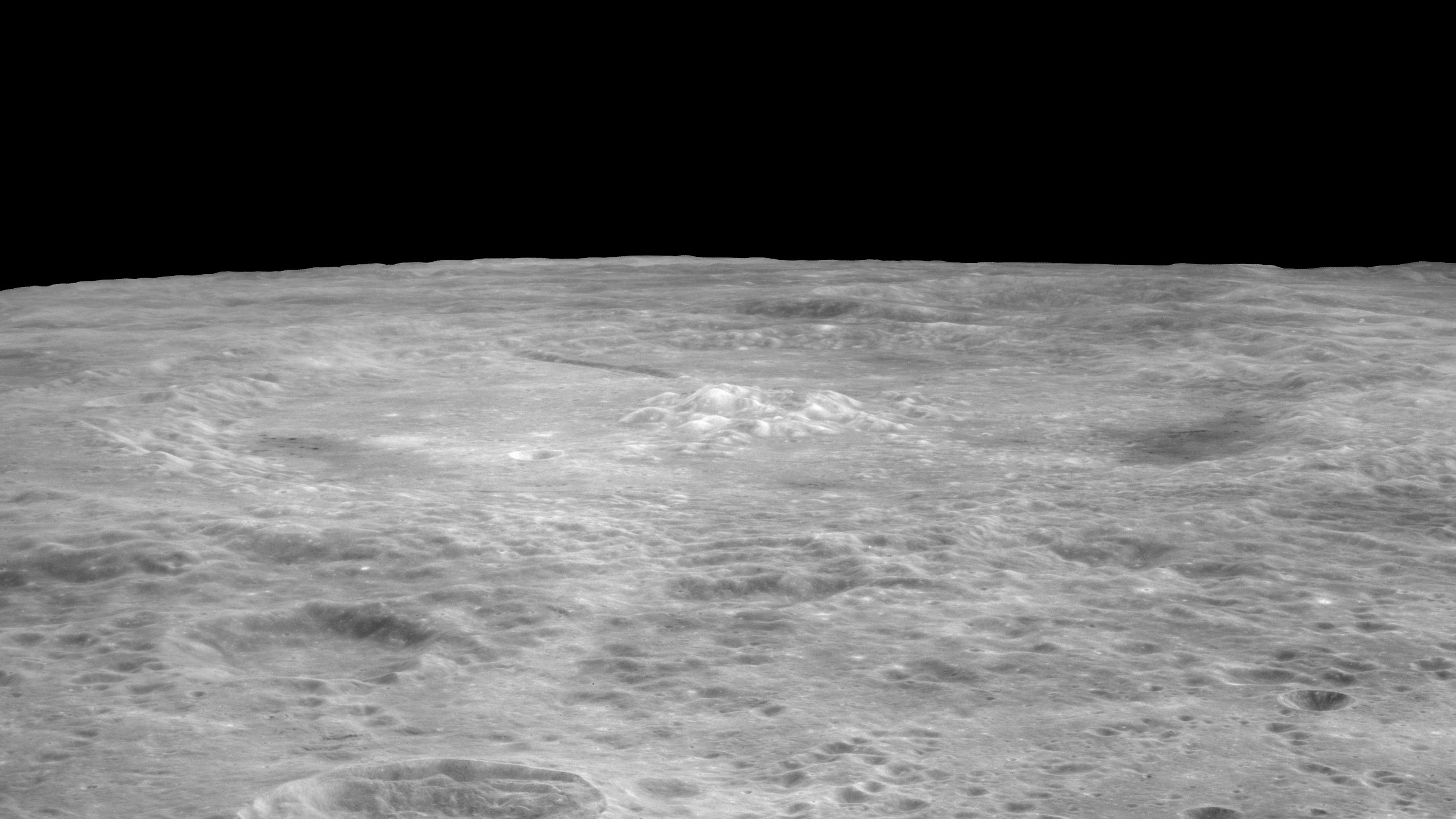
Oblique view from Apollo 17

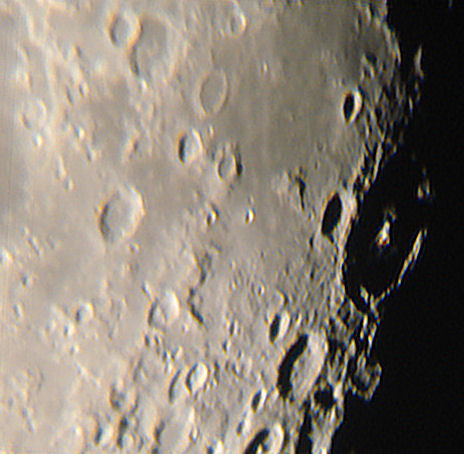
Petavius crater at the terminator, from Earth

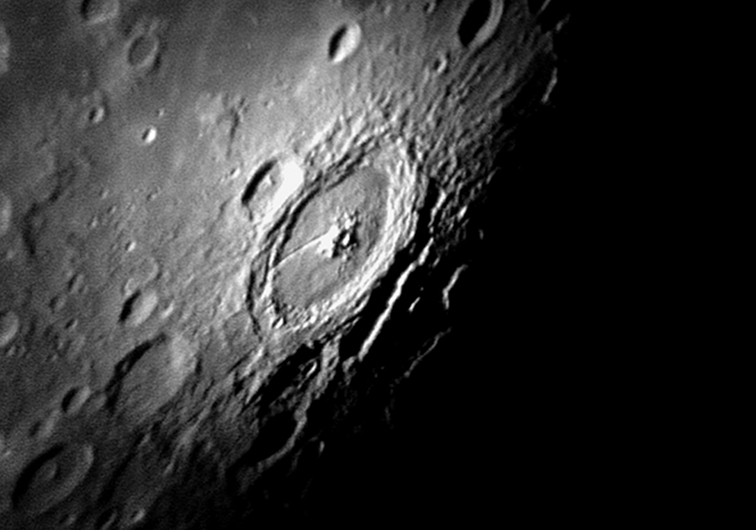
Petavius crater viewed from Earth

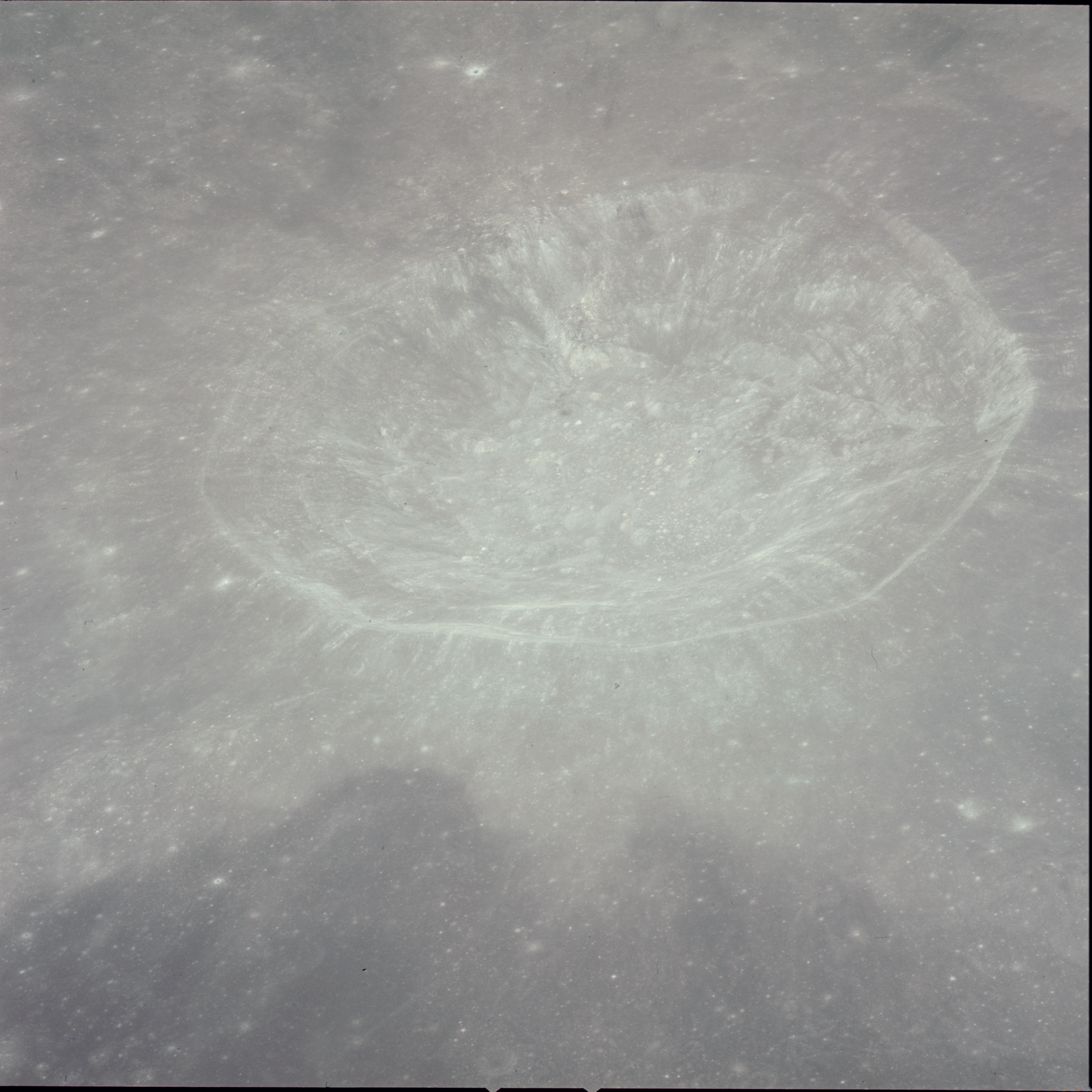
Petavius B crater, from Apollo 12

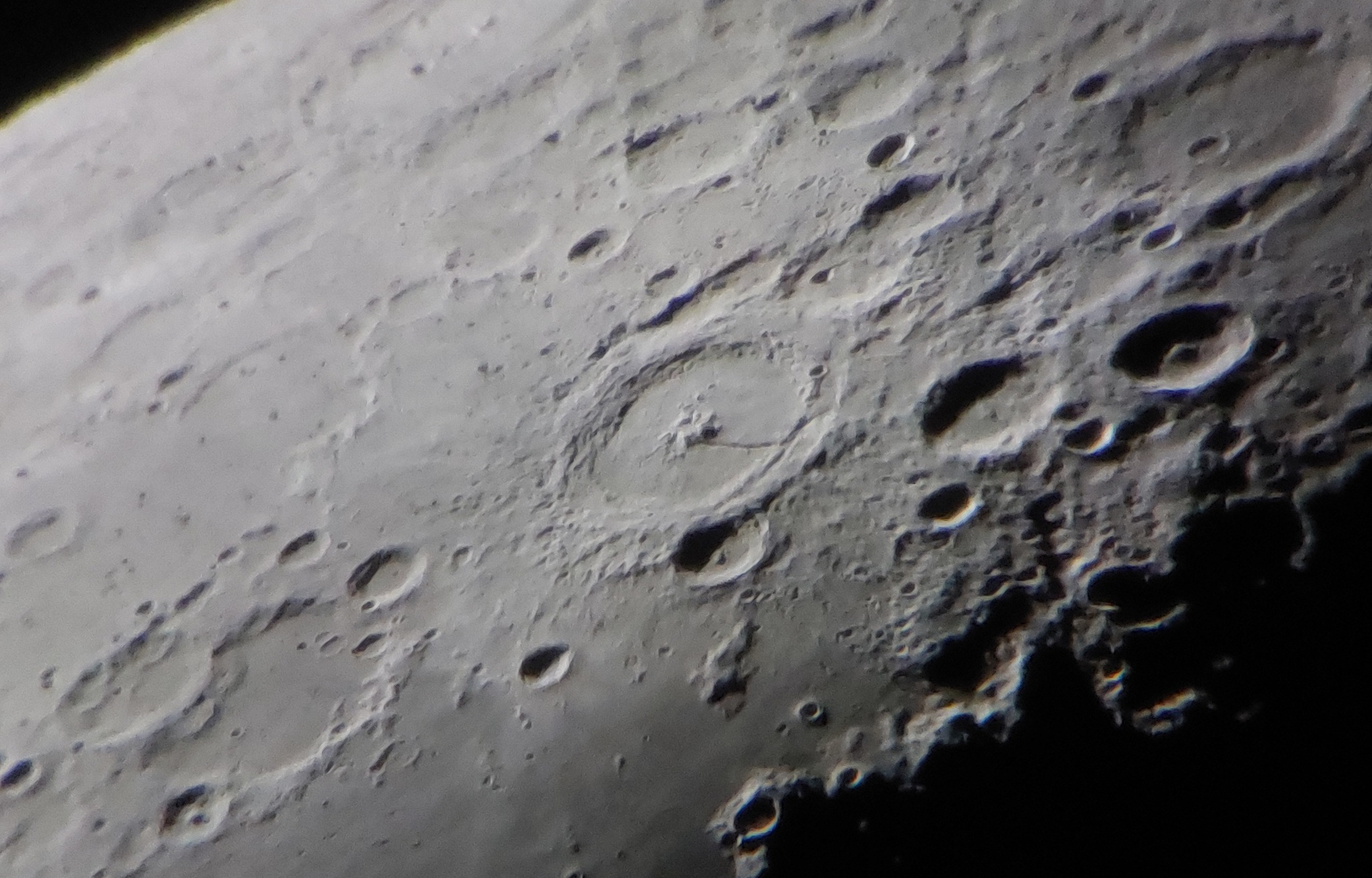
Petavius crater viewed through an 8 inch dobson telescope
