= Neander =

Neander may refer to:

== Surname ==
- August Neander (1789–1850), a German theologian and church historian
- Ernst Neumann-Neander (1871–1954), founder of the now defunct Neander motorcycle manufacturer
- Joachim Neander (1650–1680), Calvinist teacher
- Joachim Neander (researcher), b. 1938, Holocaust researcher, mathematician and poet based since 1999 in Krakow
- Karen Neander (1954–2020), philosopher and professor at Duke University.
- Michael Neander (1529–1581), professor of medicine at the University of Jena
- Michael Neander (philologist) (1525–1595), philologist from Sorau, Germany

== Other uses ==
- Neander crater on the Moon
- Neander Lake, a lake in Minnesota
- Neander, character from Essay of Dramatick Poesie
- Neander (motorcycle)

== See also ==
- Neandertal (valley) (formerly Neanderthal) in Germany
- Neanderthal
