= List of valleys on the Moon =

There are several large valleys that have been given names on the surface of the Moon. These are listed below. Most of these valleys are named after a nearby crater; see the list of craters on the Moon for more information.

Valley	Coordinates	Dimension	Eponym	Crater
Vallis Alpes	48.5°N 3.2°E	166 km	Latin name meaning "Alpine valley"	None
Vallis Baade	45.9°S 76.2°W	203 km	Walter Baade	Baade
Vallis Bohr	12.4°N 86.6°W	80 km	Niels Bohr	Bohr
Vallis Bouvard	38.3°S 83.1°W	284 km	Alexis Bouvard	None
Vallis Capella	7.6°S 34.9°E	49 km	Martianus Capella	Capella
Vallis Inghirami	43.8°S 72.2°W	148 km	Giovanni Inghirami	Inghirami
Vallis Palitzsch	26.4°S 64.3°E	132 km	Johann Palitzsch	Palitzsch
Vallis Planck	58.4°S 126.1°E	451 km	Max Planck	Planck
Vallis Rheita	42.5°S 51.5°E	445 km	Anton Maria Schyrleus of Rheita	Rheita
Vallis Schrödinger	67.0°S 105.0°E	310 km	Erwin Schrödinger	Schrödinger
Vallis Schröteri	26.2°N 50.8°W	168 km	Johann Hieronymus Schröter	Schröter
Vallis Snellius	31.1°S 56.0°E	592 km	Willebrord Snell	Snellius

== See also ==
- List of craters on the Moon
- List of features on the Moon
- List of maria on the Moon
- List of mountains on the Moon
