= Inghirami =

Inghirami is a surname. Notable people with the surname include:

- Jacopo Inghirami (1565–1624), admiral of the Grand Duchy of Tuscany and marquis of Montevitozzo
- Curzio Inghirami (1614 — 1655), Italian archaeologist and historian
- Giovanni Inghirami (1779–1851), Italian astronomer, Catholic priest and Piarist
- Francesco Inghirami (1772-1846), Italian archeologist, brother of Giovanni
- Tommaso Inghirami (1470–1516) (also known as Phaedra, Phaedrus, or Fedra), Italian renaissance humanist and deacon of the Catholic Church

== See also ==
- Inghirami (crater), lunar impact crater
