= McClure (crater) =

Crater on the Moon

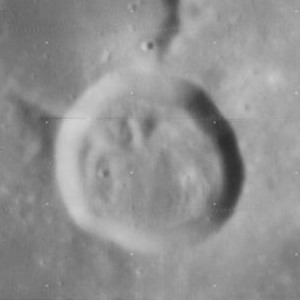
- Lunar Orbiter 4 image
- Coordinates: 15.3°S 50.3°E
- Diameter: 24 km
- Depth: 1.5 km
- Colongitude: 310° at sunrise
- Eponym: Robert le M. McClure

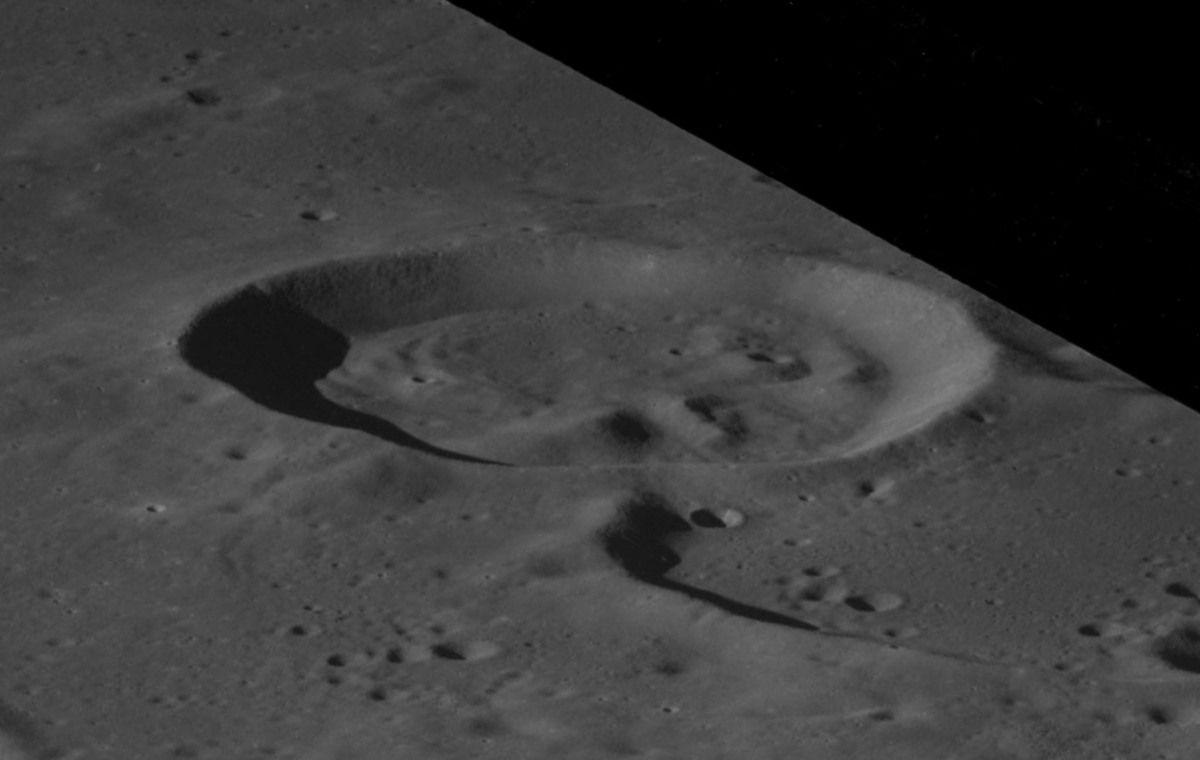
Oblique view facing south from Apollo 8

McClure is a small lunar impact crater. It is located along the western edge of the Mare Fecunditatis, due east of the prominent crater Colombo. To the north of McClure is the similar Crozier, and to the southwest is the larger Cook. The outer rim is nearly circular and not significantly worn. The inner walls slope down to a somewhat irregular interior floor. McClure C is attached to the exterior of the northwest rim.

== Satellite craters ==
By convention these features are identified on lunar maps by placing the letter on the side of the crater midpoint that is closest to McClure.

McClure	Latitude	Longitude	Diameter
A	15.7° S	49.1° E	6 km
B	15.4° S	49.3° E	9 km
C	14.7° S	49.8° E	27 km
D	14.8° S	51.8° E	22 km
M	14.2° S	51.3° E	21 km
N	14.2° S	52.7° E	9 km
P	14.8° S	53.5° E	16 km
S	13.8° S	53.4° E	4 km
