= Rheita =

Rheita can refer to:

- Rheita (crater), the lunar crater
- Vallis Rheita, the lunar valley
- Anton Maria Schyrleus of Rheita (1597-1660), the Austrian-Czech astronomer after whom the crater and the valley are named
