= Brisbane (crater) =

Crater on the Moon

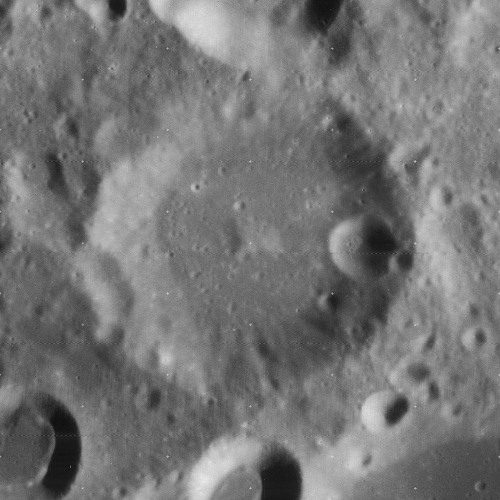
- Lunar Orbiter 4 image
- Coordinates: 49.1°S 68.5°E
- Diameter: 44.32 km (27.54 mi)
- Depth: 1.7 km (1.1 mi)
- Colongitude: 292° at sunrise
- Formation: Pre-Nectarian
- Eponym: Thomas Brisbane

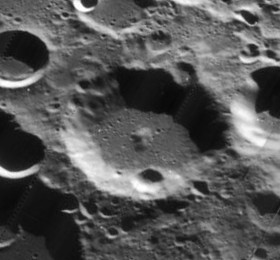
Oblique view also from Lunar Orbiter 4, facing west

Brisbane is a lunar impact crater that is located in the southeastern part of the Moon, to the south of the crater Peirescius. To the northwest lie the craters Vega and Reimarus, and farther to the east is the walled plain named Lyot. Due to its proximity to the limb, foreshortening of this crater causes it to appear somewhat elliptical in shape, even though it is actually circular.

On the lunar geologic timescale, this feature dates to the Pre-Nectarian period. It is an old, eroded crater with features that have become somewhat softened and rounded due to a history of subsequent impacts. There are small craterlets along the rim, most notably along the western wall and the northeast inner wall. The interior floor is nearly level and contains no significant impacts. The surface is light plains material with no impact melt. There is a slight central rise at the midpoint.

This crater is named after Scottish astronomer Thomas Brisbane (1773-1860). His name was added to lunar nomenclature in 1878 by German astronomer Johann F. J. Schmidt. Its designation was officially adopted by the International Astronomical Union in 1935.

== Satellite craters ==
By convention these features are identified on lunar maps by placing the letter on the side of the crater midpoint that is closest to Brisbane.

| Brisbane | Latitude | Longitude | Diameter |
|---|---|---|---|
| E | 50.0° S | 71.2° E | 56 km |
| H | 50.3° S | 64.9° E | 43 km |
| X | 50.4° S | 67.4° E | 20 km |
| Y | 51.4° S | 69.8° E | 17 km |
| Z | 52.8° S | 72.4° E | 64 km |
