= Vallis =

Vallis (plural Valles) is Latin for valley, vale; it may refer to the following :

Places and jurisdictions on Earth

- the Swiss canton Wallis
- Vallis (see), an ancient city, former bishopric and Latin Catholic titular see in Africa Proconsularis
- Vallis Vale in Somerset

Astronomy

- Vallis (planetary geology)
- Vallis Alpes on the Moon
- Vallis Rheita on the Moon
- Vallis Snellius on the Moon
- Valles Marineris on Mars

== See also ==
- Valles (disambiguation)
