= Borda (crater) =

Lunar impact crater

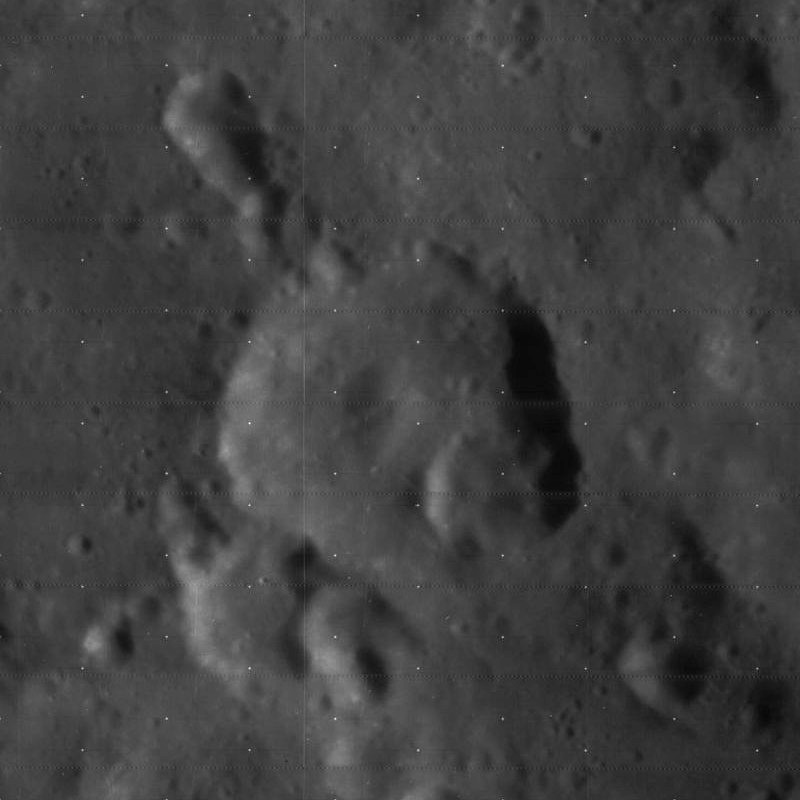
- Lunar Orbiter 4 image
- Coordinates: 25.1°S 46.6°E
- Diameter: 45.40 km (28.21 mi)
- Depth: 2.9 km (1.8 mi)
- Colongitude: 314° at sunrise
- Eponym: Jean-Charles de Borda

Borda is a lunar impact crater that lies between Santbech to the north-northwest and Reichenbach slightly further away to the south-southeast. It has a low rim that is broken along the southeast by a smaller crater. The rim is intruded into by another small crater along the southwest side, and there is an irregular cleft along the northwest face. There is a central peak at the midpoint of the floor. Vallis Snellius extends eastward from south of this crater to Hase D, a length of 500 km.

This crater is named after French astronomer Jean-Charles de Borda (1733-1799). His name was incorporated into lunar nomenclature by German astronomer J. H. von Mädler in 1837. Its designation was formally adopted by the International Astronomical Union in 1935.

== Satellite craters ==
By convention these features are identified on lunar maps by placing the letter on the side of the crater midpoint that is closest to Borda.

Borda	Latitude	Longitude	Diameter
A	26.8° S	51.0 E	19 km
D	24.5° S	46.3° E	6 km
E	24.0° S	45.5° E	12 km
F	26.3° S	47.5° E	11 km
G	26.2° S	45.4° E	6 km
H	26.7° S	46.7° E	10 km
J	26.9° S	47.0° E	17 km
K	27.5° S	47.2° E	12 km
L	27.0° S	47.7° E	12 km
M	25.4° S	43.9° E	15 km
R	27.4° S	50.5° E	17 km
