= Peiresc =

Peiresc may refer to:

- Nicolas-Claude Fabri de Peiresc (1580–1637), French astronomer, antiquary and savant
- 19226 Peiresc, an outer main-belt asteroid named after the astronomer
- Peirescius (crater), a crater located in the southeastern part of the Moon, also named after the astronomer
