= Bellot (crater) =

Lunar crater

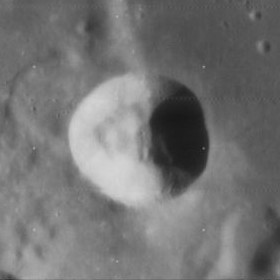
- Lunar Orbiter 4 image
- Coordinates: 12.4°S 48.2°E
- Diameter: 17.50 km (10.87 mi)
- Depth: 2.2 km (1.4 mi)
- Colongitude: 312° at sunrise
- Eponym: Joseph R. Bellot

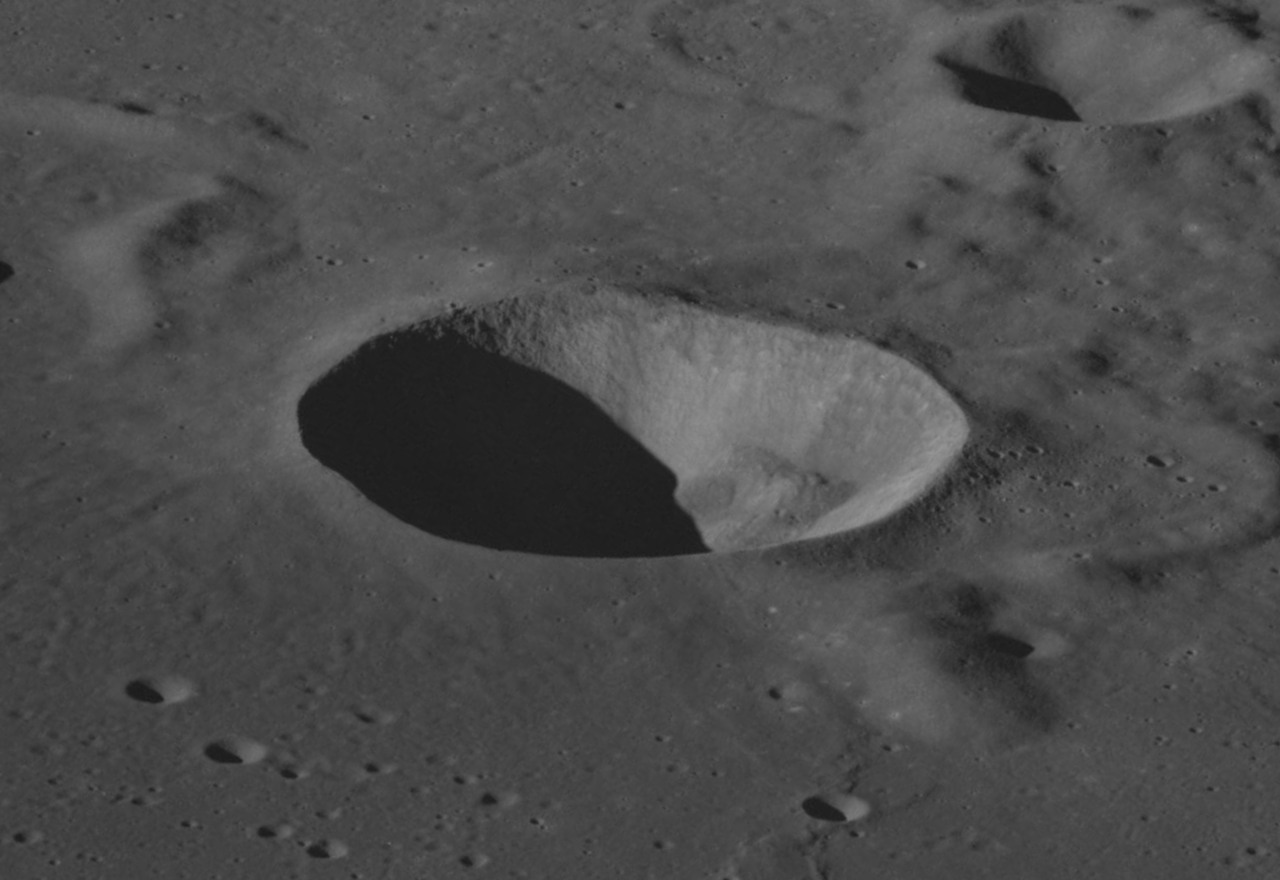
Oblique view facing south from Apollo 8

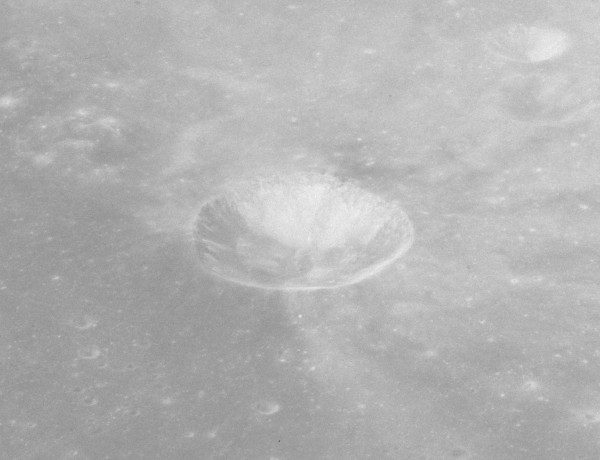
Oblique view facing south from Apollo 16

Bellot is a small lunar impact crater that is located on the southwest edge of Mare Fecunditatis. It lies between the craters Goclenius to the northwest and Crozier to the southeast. To the southwest is Colombo, and to the west is Magelhaens.

This formation is circular and bowl-shaped, with inner sides that slope down to the small interior floor. The inner walls have a higher albedo than the nearby lunar mare. Some slumping is visible along the base of the walls.

This crater is named after French explorer Joseph R. Bellot (1826-1853). The name was incorporated into lunar nomenclature by William R. Birt and John Lee in the 19th century. Its designation was officially adopted by the International Astronomical Union in 1935.

== Bellot during full moon ==
As seen through telescopes, the southern inner slopes of Bellot show an eye catching white looking brightness which is distinctive before and during full moon. The bright southern section of Bellot is also noticeable on the photographic version of chart LAC 79 (page 158) in The Clementine Atlas of the Moon (Ben Bussey / Paul D. Spudis).

== Satellite craters ==
By convention these features are identified on lunar maps by placing the letter on the side of the crater midpoint that is closest to Bellot.

Bellot	Latitude	Longitude	Diameter
A	13.4° S	47.7° E	8 km
B	13.5° S	47.8° E	7 km
