= Mallet (crater) =

Lunar impact crater

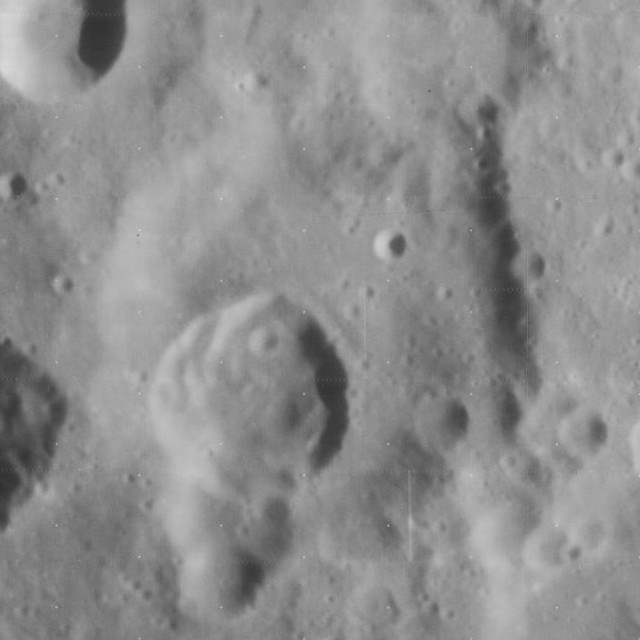
- Lunar Orbiter 4 image
- Coordinates: 45.4°S 54.2°E
- Diameter: 58 km
- Depth: 2.3 km
- Colongitude: 307° at sunrise
- Eponym: Robert Mallet

Mallet is a crater on the near side of the Moon. It is located next to the linear valley named Vallis Rheita, in the rugged southeastern quadrant. To the northwest along the same valley formation is the crater Young.

This is an old formation with a worn and rounded outer rim. The satellite crater Mallet A lies across the southwest part of the interior floor, and encroaches along the southwestern inner wall. Mallet B is nearly attached to the exterior only a few kilometers from Mallet A. The Vallis Rheita passes across the northeastern part of the rim, forming a nearly linear face along the outer rim. The remaining interior floor is marked by a small craterlet near the northern inner wall.

== Satellite craters ==
By convention these features are identified on lunar maps by placing the letter on the side of the crater midpoint that is closest to Mallet.

Mallet	Latitude	Longitude	Diameter
A	45.9° S	53.8° E	28 km
B	46.6° S	52.0° E	32 km
C	44.0° S	53.8° E	28 km
D	46.0° S	57.0° E	42 km
E	45.0° S	54.3° E	5 km
J	48.7° S	55.9° E	52 km
K	47.6° S	57.0° E	43 km
L	47.7° S	55.5° E	13 km
