= Monge (crater) =

Crater on the Moon

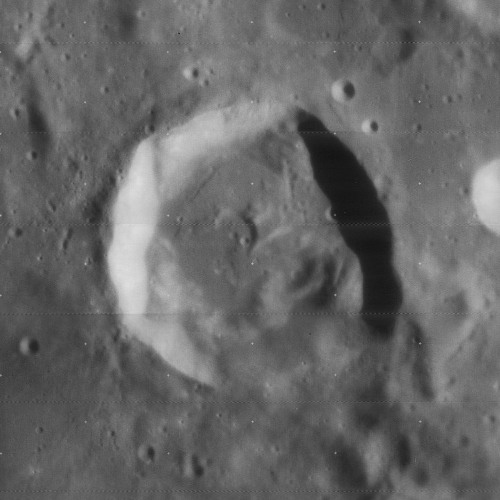
- Lunar Orbiter 4 image
- Coordinates: 19.24°S 47.54°E
- Diameter: 36.6 km (22.7 mi)
- Depth: 2.6 km (1.6 mi)
- Colongitude: 313° at sunrise
- Eponym: Gaspard Monge

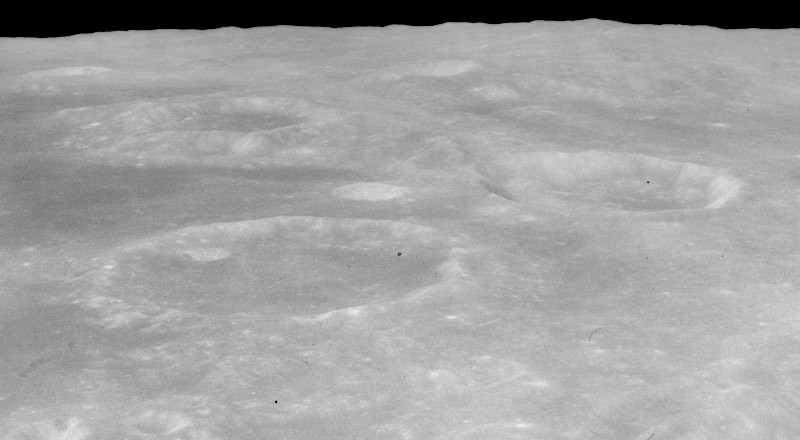
Oblique view of Cook crater (below left of center) and Monge crater (above right of center), facing south, from Apollo 16

Monge is a lunar impact crater that lies along the southwestern edge of the Mare Fecunditatis. It was named after French mathematician Gaspard Monge. The outer rim is somewhat irregular in shape, with an outward bulge to the east and smaller bulges to the north and northwest. The interior floor is somewhat irregular in the eastern half, and there are accumulations along the bases of the sloping interior walls. The nearest named crater is Cook to the northeast, while the larger Santbech is located to the west-southwest.
