= Reimarus (crater) =

Crater on the Moon

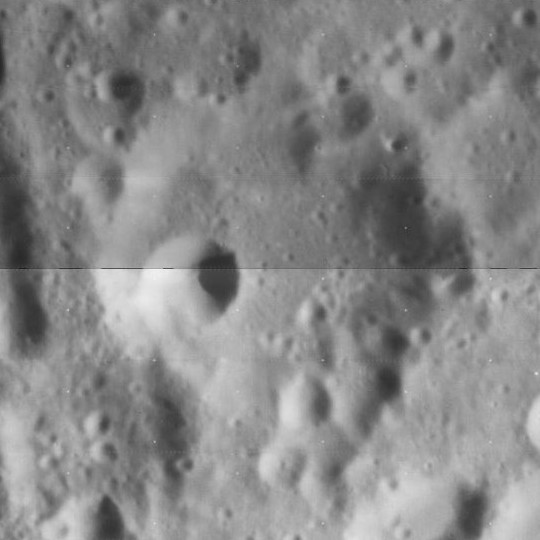
- Lunar Orbiter 4 image
- Coordinates: 47.7°S 60.3°E
- Diameter: 48 km
- Depth: 2.7 km
- Colongitude: 301° at sunrise
- Eponym: N. Reymers Bär

Reimarus is a lunar impact crater, located in the southeastern part of the Moon's near side. The eroded southeastern end of the long Vallis Rheita (Rheita valley) passes just to the west. To the northeast is the larger and heavily worn crater Vega.

This is a heavily worn and eroded crater, with an outer rim that has been incised and battered by multiple lesser, later impacts, particularly in the western half. Several small craterlets lie along the rim edge and the inner walls, and the outer rise is generally uneven and rugged. On the southwest part of the interior floor is a small crater. The remainder of the floor is generally featureless and marked only by a few tiny craterlets.

== Satellite craters ==
By convention these features are identified on lunar maps by placing the letter on the side of the crater midpoint that is closest to Reimarus.

Reimarus	Latitude	Longitude	Diameter
A	48.8° S	59.9° E	29 km
B	49.5° S	60.6° E	16 km
C	50.2° S	59.5° E	11 km
F	49.5° S	58.7° E	7 km
H	49.3° S	62.3° E	10 km
R	47.7° S	63.9° E	35 km
S	47.8° S	62.8° E	9 km
T	48.4° S	63.5° E	24 km
U	48.5° S	62.2° E	20 km
