= Santbech (crater) =

Crater on the Moon

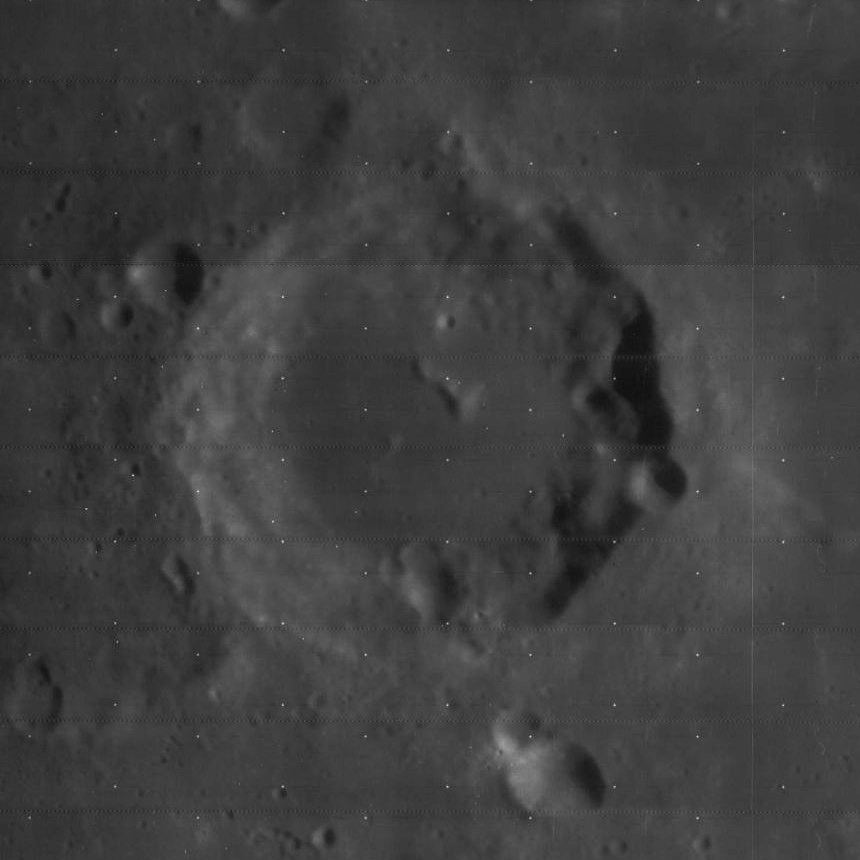
- Lunar Orbiter 4 image
- Coordinates: 20.9°S 44.0°E
- Diameter: 64 km
- Depth: 4.5 km
- Colongitude: 317° at sunrise
- Eponym: Daniel Santbech (Noviomagus)

Santbech is a lunar impact crater that is located to the southeast of Mare Nectaris. It lies south-southwest of the prominent crater Colombo. About one crater diameter to the east-northeast is the smaller Monge. The terrain around the crater, although rugged in places, has been flooded by lava and so has a low albedo and a relatively flat surface. It was named after the 16th-century Dutch mathematician and astronomer Daniel Santbech Noviomagus. It is from the Pre-Imbrian period, 4.55 to 3.85 billion years ago.

The outer rim of this crater stands above the surrounding terrain, with an irregular outer rampart. The rim perimeter is somewhat irregular, and has been disturbed in several locations by subsequent impacts. There are small craters along the eastern and northwestern rim, and an asymmetrical formation along the southern inner wall. The northern rim is uneven, with a diagonal gouge running to the southeast. Much of the interior floor is level and nearly featureless, with a small central peak offset to the north-northeast of the midpoint.

== Satellite craters ==
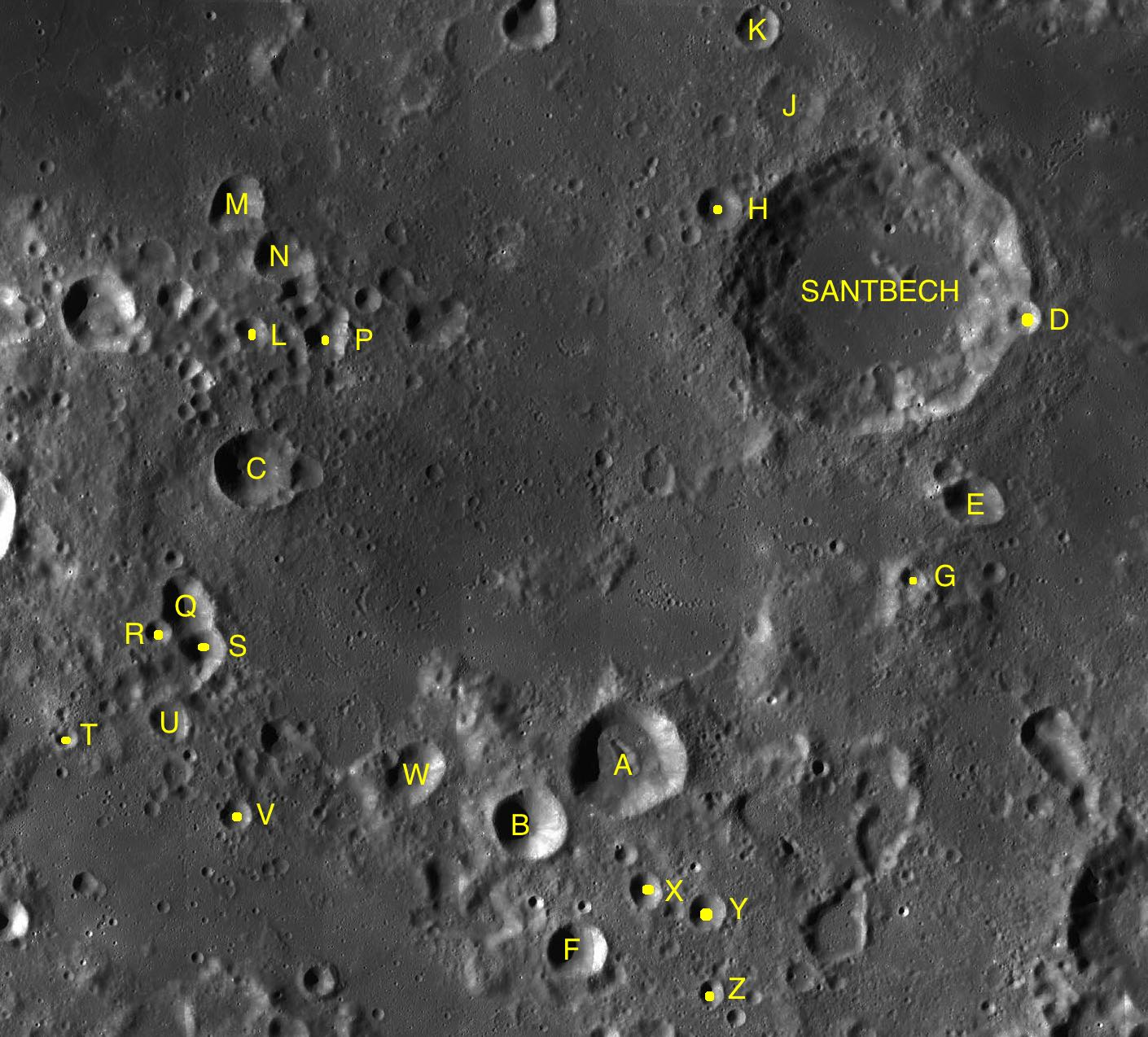
Santbech and its satellite craters

By convention these features are identified on lunar maps by placing the letter on the side of the crater midpoint that is closest to Santbech.

Santbech	Latitude	Longitude	Diameter
A	24.2° S	42.3° E	25 km
B	24.7° S	41.6° E	16 km
C	22.3° S	39.5° E	18 km
D	21.0° S	45.2° E	8 km
E	22.3° S	44.8° E	12 km
F	25.5° S	41.9° E	13 km
G	22.9° S	44.5° E	5 km
H	20.4° S	42.8° E	10 km
J	19.7° S	43.3° E	14 km
K	19.1° S	43.1° E	10 km
L	21.3° S	39.4° E	8 km
M	20.4° S	39.3° E	13 km
N	20.8° S	39.6° E	13 km
P	21.3° S	40.0° E	9 km
Q	23.2° S	39.0° E	12 km
R	23.3° S	38.9° E	5 km
S	23.5° S	39.1° E	10 km
T	24.1° S	38.1° E	5 km
U	24.0° S	38.8° E	9 km
V	24.6° S	39.3° E	7 km
W	24.3° S	40.7° E	13 km
X	25.2° S	42.5° E	7 km
Y	25.2° S	42.9° E	8 km
Z	25.8° S	43.1° E	5 km
