= Neander (crater) =

Lunar impact crater

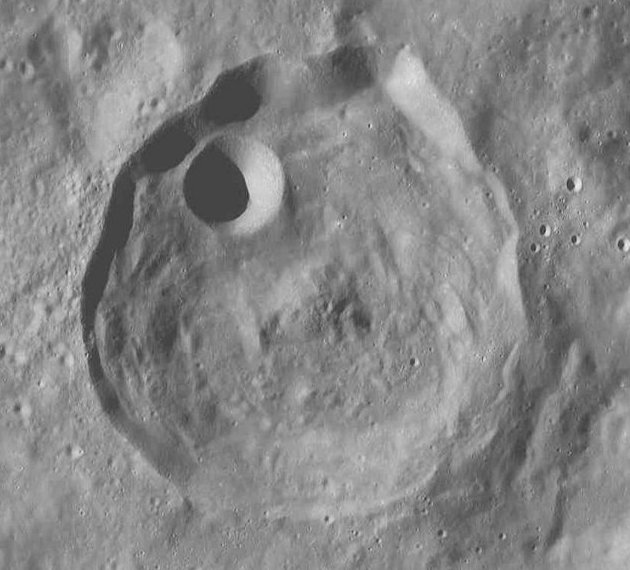
- LRO image
- Coordinates: 31.3°S 39.9°E
- Diameter: 50 km
- Depth: 3.4 km
- Colongitude: 321° at sunrise
- Eponym: Michael Neander

Neander is a lunar impact crater that is located to the south of Mare Nectaris, in the southeastern part of the Moon's near side. It was named after 16th century German mathematician Michael Neander. To the west-northwest lies the prominent crater Piccolomini. The northwestern extension of the Vallis Rheita lunar valley passes about a crater diameter to the west of this formation.

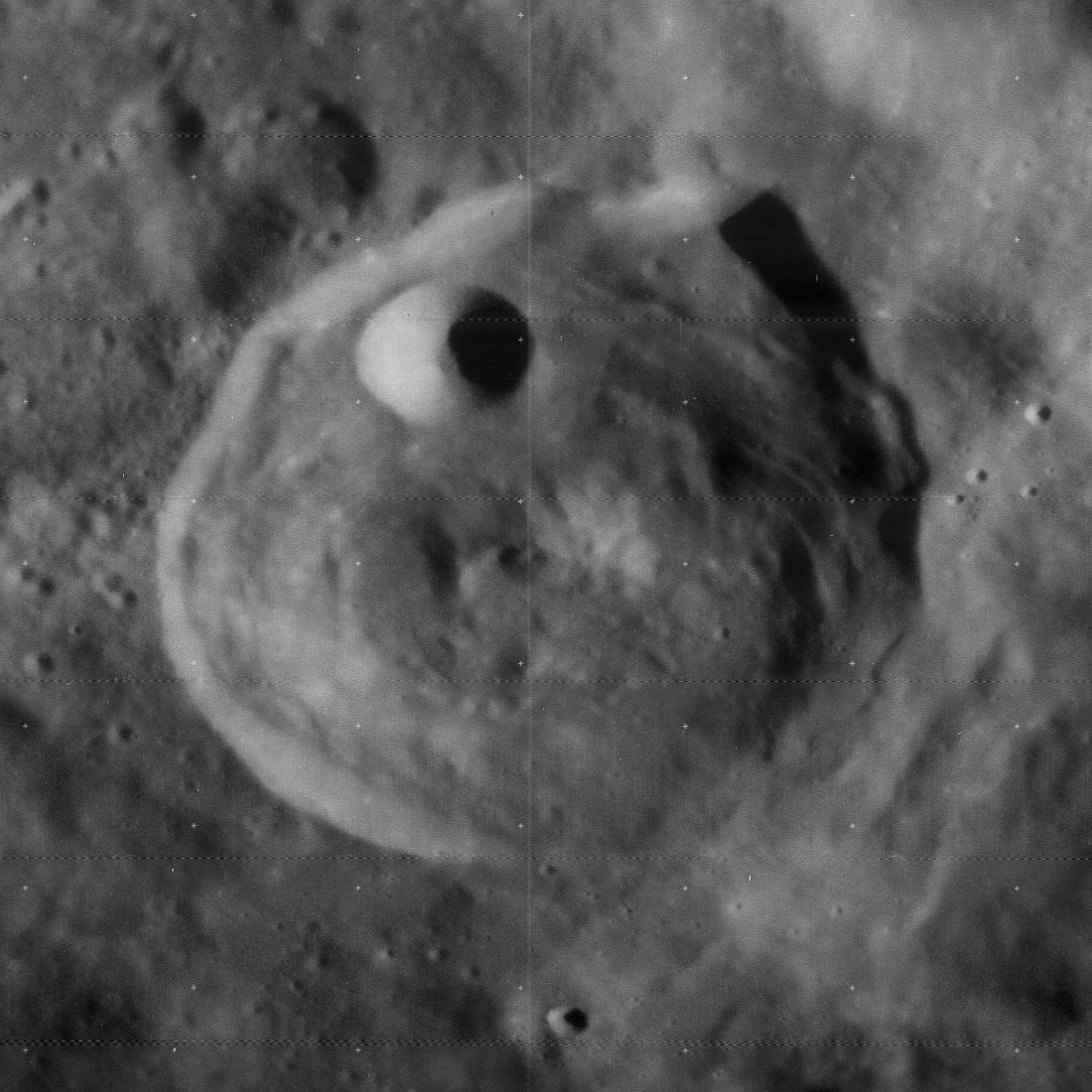
Lunar Orbiter 4 image (North on the photo is slightly 10-15 degrees to the right from center to top)

The rim of Neander is roughly circular and somewhat sharp-edged, with some ledges formed along the inner sides. The circular, cup-shaped Neander A lies along the northwestern inner wall. The interior floor is uneven, with a formation of central peaks located at the midpoint.

== Satellite craters ==
By convention these features are identified on lunar maps by placing the letter on the side of the crater midpoint that is closest to Neander.

Neander	Latitude	Longitude	Diameter
A	30.9° S	39.6° E	11 km
B	28.2° S	40.1° E	9 km
C	28.6° S	36.0° E	20 km
D	26.5° S	42.4° E	11 km
E	29.8° S	40.7° E	25 km
F	32.1° S	37.9° E	22 km
G	33.4° S	43.8° E	18 km
H	33.0° S	42.4° E	13 km
J	34.0° S	43.4° E	13 km
K	35.0° S	39.8° E	14 km
L	31.3° S	41.8° E	21 km
M	34.8° S	37.7° E	11 km
N	32.4° S	37.2° E	17 km
O	35.6° S	39.1° E	13 km
P	28.4° S	41.1° E	6 km
Q	28.8° S	41.4° E	6 km
R	33.2° S	38.6° E	12 km
S	31.9° S	42.1° E	12 km
T	29.9° S	38.4° E	10 km
V	31.3° S	38.2° E	5 km
W	32.3° S	38.5° E	9 km
X	33.1° S	37.8° E	8 km
Y	34.5° S	38.2° E	8 km
Z	33.8° S	42.0° E	7 km
