= Crozier (crater) =

Crater on the Moon

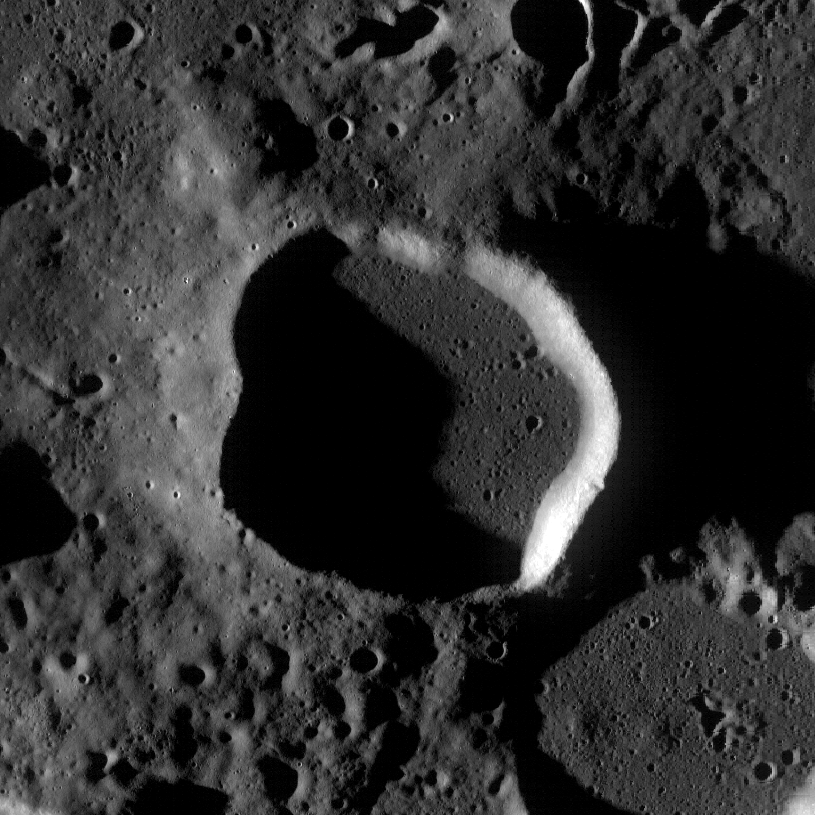
- LRO image
- Coordinates: 13.5°S 50.8°E
- Diameter: 22.51 km (13.99 mi)
- Depth: 1.3 km (0.81 mi)
- Colongitude: 310° at sunrise
- Eponym: Francis R. M. Crozier

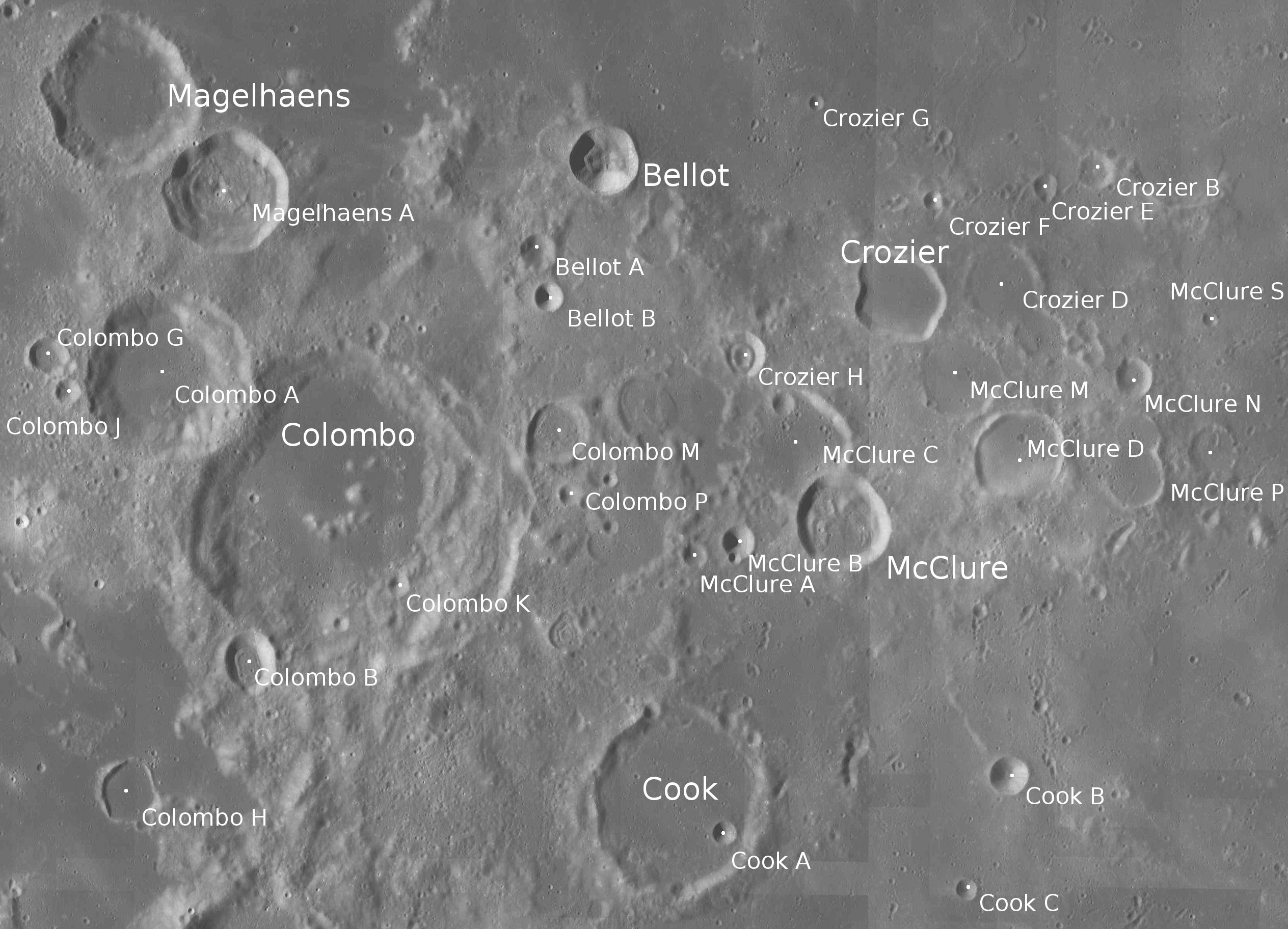
Neighborhood of Crozier, including satellite features

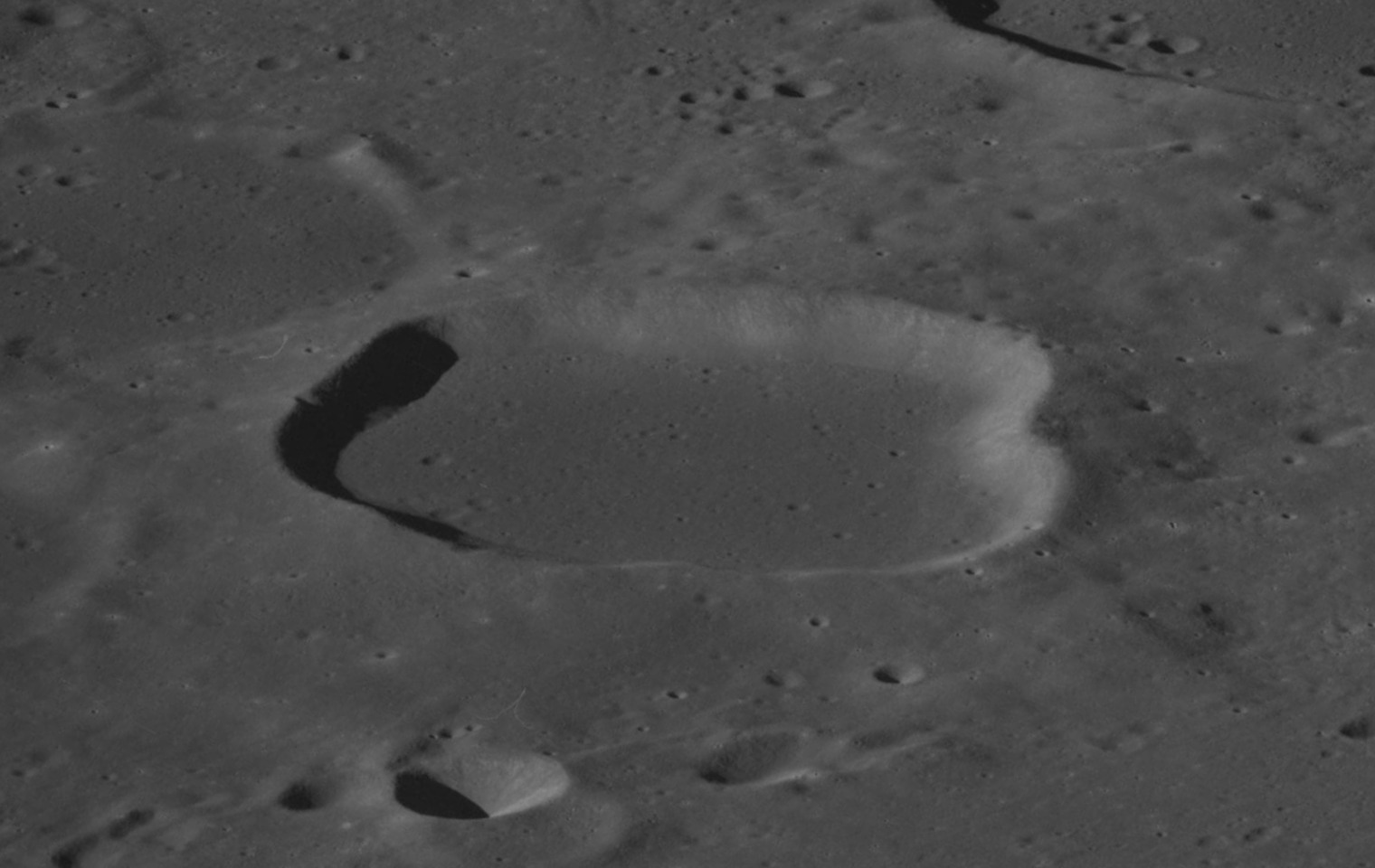
Oblique view facing south from Apollo 8

Crozier is a lunar impact crater that is located on the southwest edge of Mare Fecunditatis, a lunar mare in the eastern part of the Moon's near side. It lies to the east-northeast of the prominent crater Colombo, and southeast of the small crater Bellot.

The narrow rim of this crater forms a distorted enclosure that has outward bulges along the northwest, southwest, and southeastern sides. The interior has been resurfaced and nearly filled by basaltic lava, producing a level floor with a low albedo that matches the dark hue of the nearby lunar mare. Nearly adjacent to the outer rim are the similar flooded craters Crozier D to the east and Crozier M to the southeast. A diffuse lunar swirl occurs to the southeast of Crozier.

The crater is named after Irish Royal Navy officer and polar explorer Francis Crozier (1796-1848). His name was introduced in the lunar nomenclature of William R. Birt and John Lee during the 19th century. Its designation was officially adopted by the International Astronomical Union in 1935.

== Satellite craters ==
By convention these features are identified on lunar maps by placing the letter on the side of the crater midpoint that is closest to Crozier.

Crozier	Coordinates	Diameter, km
B	12.55°S 52.39°E	8.9
D	13.46°S 51.59°E	19.4
E	12.67°S 51.95°E	6.0
F	12.79°S 51.00°E	4.6
G	12.02°S 49.99°E	4.1
H	14.01°S 49.38°E	10.5
L	10.00°S 51.50°E	8.4
M	8.84°S 51.36°E	5.9

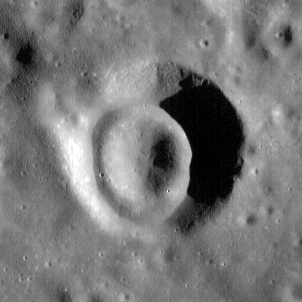
The concentric crater Crozier H

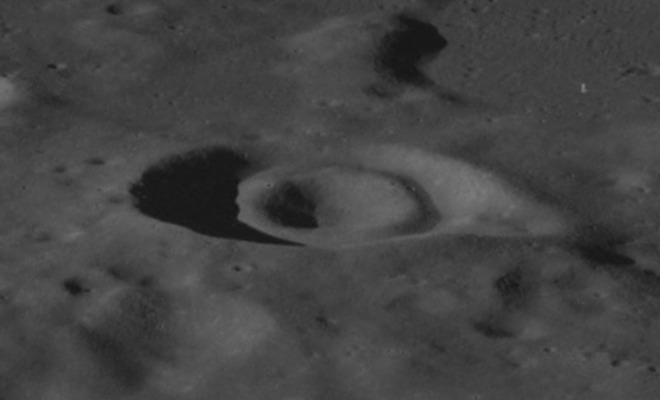
Crozier H, from Apollo 8
