= Daniel Santbech =

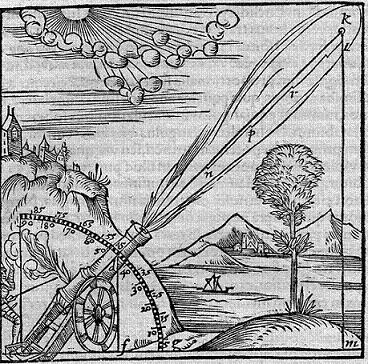
Detail from Santbech's Problematum astronomicorum et geometricorum

Daniel Santbech (fl. 1561) was a Dutch mathematician and astronomer. He adopted the Latinized name of Noviomagus, possibly suggesting that he came from the town of Nijmegen, called Ulpia Noviomagus Batavorum by the Romans.

In 1561, Santbech compiled a collected edition of the works of Regiomontanus (1436–1476), De triangulis planis et sphaericis libri quinque (first published in 1533) and Compositio tabularum sinum recto, as well as Santbech's own Problematum astronomicorum et geometricorum sectiones septem. It was published in Basel by Henrich Petri and Petrus Perna.

Santbech's work consisted of studies on astronomy, sundials, surveying, and levelling for water courses. It also includes descriptions of astronomical instruments, information for navigators and geographers, and general information about astronomy in the first years after Nicolaus Copernicus.

Santbech also studied the subject of gunnery and ballistics as a theoretic discourse as well as for the practical application of war, and utilized the foundations of geometry, with ample references to Euclid and Ptolemy, in order to do so. Santbech seem not to have been aware of similar studies by Niccolò Fontana Tartaglia.

Santbech's text included theoretical illustrations of trajectories. These were depicted with abruptly acute angles and straight lines, allowing him to create a right-angled triangle from which ranges were computed with the help of a table of sines. Santbech was of course fully aware that a cannonball's true trajectory would not consist of a straight line and a sudden drop, but these depictions were meant to assist with mathematical calculations.

In 1651, Riccioli gave Santbech's name to the crater Santbech on the Moon.
