= Cook (crater) =

Lunar impact crater

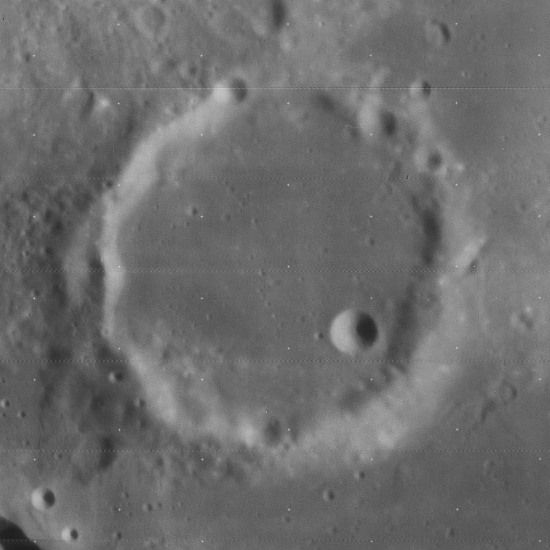
- Lunar Orbiter 4 image
- Coordinates: 17.50°S 48.81°E
- Diameter: 45.16 km (28.06 mi)
- Depth: 1.2 km (0.75 mi)
- Colongitude: 312° at sunrise
- Eponym: James Cook

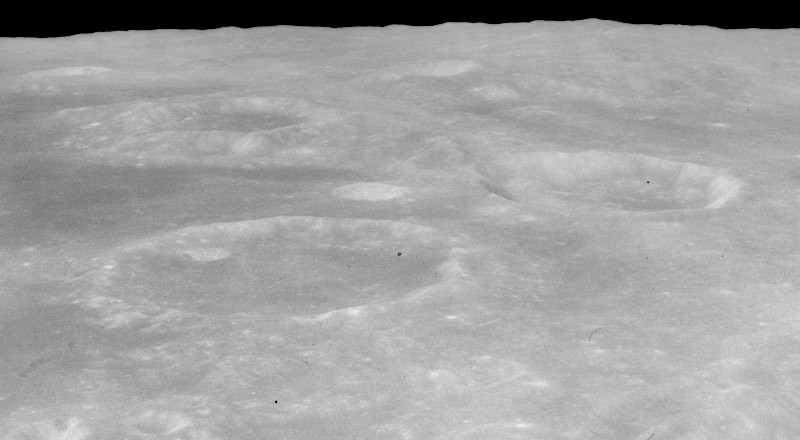
Oblique view of Cook crater (below left of center) and Monge crater (above right of center), facing south, from Apollo 16

Cook is a lunar impact crater that lies in the western part of the Mare Fecunditatis. This formation is easy to spot due to its dark floor. To the northwest of Cook is the prominent crater Colombo. To the southwest is Monge.

The interior of this crater has been flooded with lava, leaving only a low rim projecting above the surface. This rim is not quite circular, and has a somewhat hexagonal appearance. The low wall is worn in a few places, particularly along the northeastern rim. There is a small crater called Cook A on the interior floor near the southeast rim.

This formation is named after British explorer James Cook (1728–1779). His name was included with the lunar nomenclature of German astronomer Johann Heinrich von Mädler in the 19th century. Its designation was formally adopted by the International Astronomical Union in 1935.

== Satellite craters ==
By convention these features are identified on lunar maps by placing the letter on the side of the crater midpoint that is closest to Cook.

Cook	Latitude	Longitude	Diameter
A	17.8° S	49.2° E	6 km
B	17.3° S	51.7° E	9 km
C	18.2° S	51.3° E	5 km
D	20.1° S	53.4° E	4 km
E	18.4° S	55.1° E	5 km
F	17.6° S	55.4° E	7 km
G	18.9° S	48.7° E	9 km
