= Giovanni Inghirami =

Italian astronomer (1779–1851)

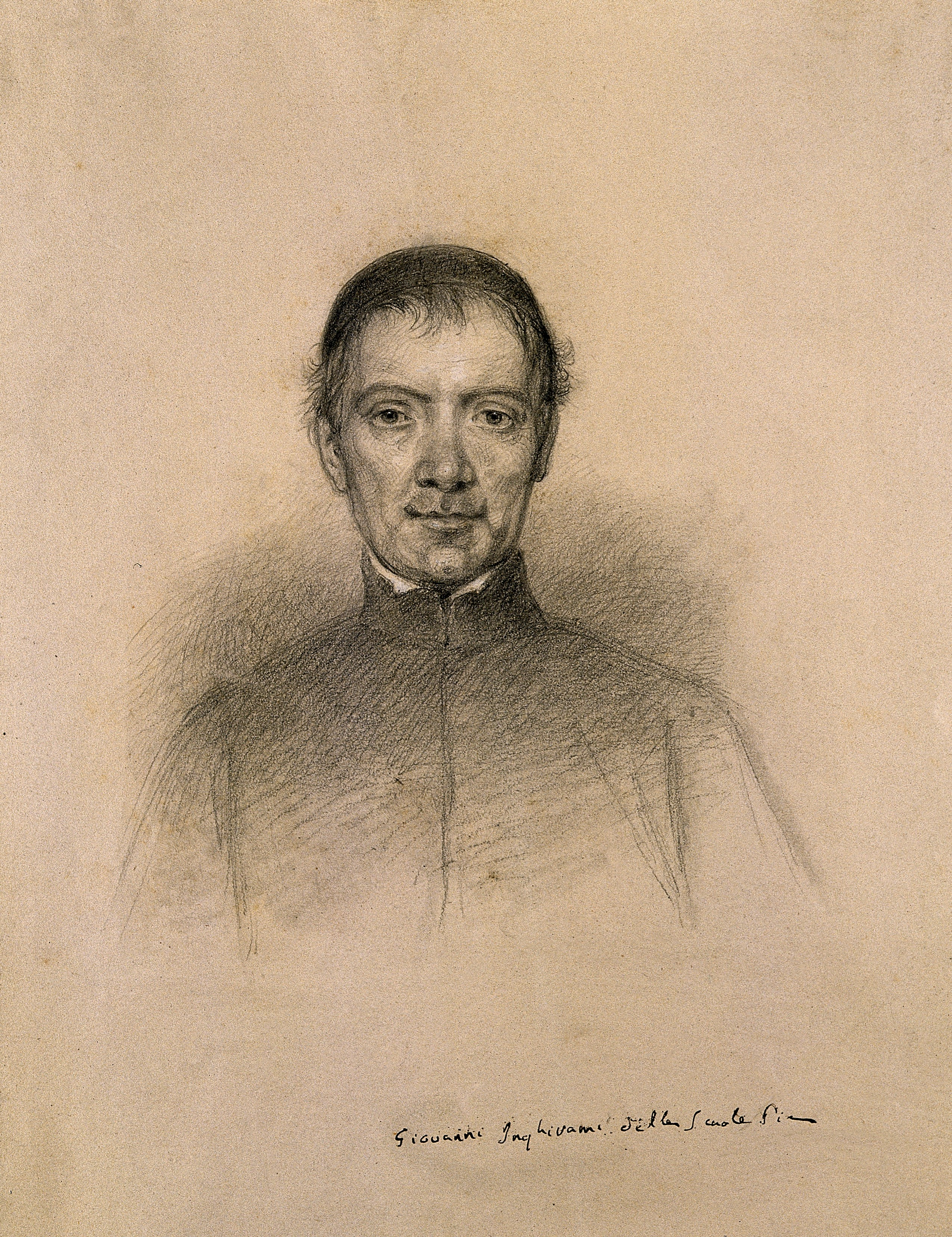
Giovanni Inghirami

Giovanni Inghirami, Sch.P., (April 16, 1779 – August 15, 1851) was an Italian astronomer, as well as being a Catholic priest and Piarist. There is a valley on the moon named Vallis Inghirami after him as well as a crater.

== Life ==
Inghirami was born in Volterra, Tuscany, in 1779. His family produced two other distinguished scholars, Tommaso (1470–1516) (a humanist scholar), and his brother, Francesco (1772–1846), an archaeologist.

Inghirami's education was received in his native city at the College of Saint Michael. He joined the religious Order of the Piarist Fathers at the age of 17, and later became professor of mathematics and philosophy at the Pious Schools of Volterra, where one of his pupils was the future Pope Pius IX. In 1805 he traveled to the north of Italy, and was engaged for some months in scientific work at Milan. He was called to Florence to fill the twofold office of professor of mathematics and astronomy at the Piarist College there.

Inghirami's first publications were articles on hydraulics, statics, and astronomy, astronomical tables, and elementary text-books on mathematics and mathematical geography. In 1830 after observations extending over fourteen years, he published, with the patronage of the Grand Duke Ferdinand III of Tuscany, a "Carta topografica e geometica della Toscana" on the scale of 1:200,000.

When the Berlin Academy of Sciences undertook the construction of an exhaustive astronomical atlas, Inghirami was assigned a section. His performance of this task won great praise. he became successively Provincial Superior and Superior General of his Order, but his failing health and his love for scientific work caused him to resign the latter office, which had required his taking up residence in Rome, and to accept the position of Vicar General of the Order. He returned to Florence and, although almost blind for some years, continued his teaching until a few months before his death in that city.

== Notable scientific literature ==
- Several articles published in the "Astronomische Nachrichten" and in Zach's "Monatliche Correspondenz zur Beförderung der Erd- u. Himmelskunde"
- "collezione di opusculi e notizie di Scienze" (4 vols., Florence, 1820–30)
- "Tavole Astronomiche universali portatili" (ibid., 1811)
- "Effemeridi di Venere e Giove ad uso di naviganti pel meridiano di Parigi" (ibid., 1821–24).

== See also ==
- List of Roman Catholic scientist-clerics
