= Peirescius (crater) =

Crater on the Moon

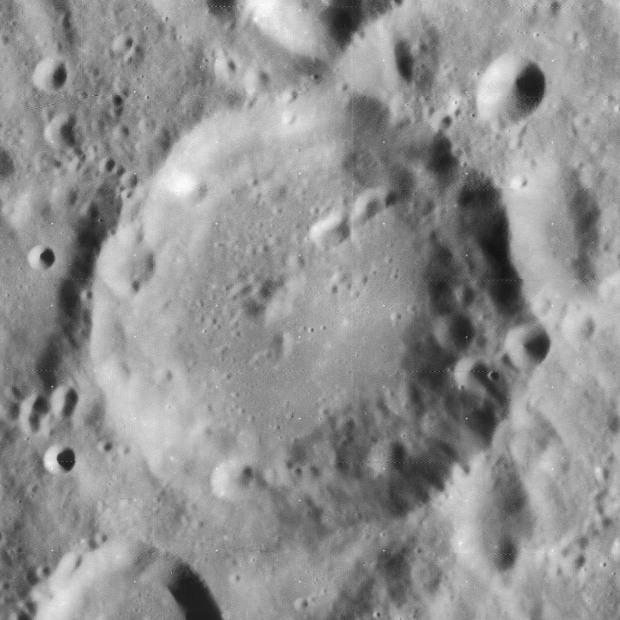
- Lunar Orbiter 4 image
- Coordinates: 46.5°S 67.6°E
- Diameter: 62 km
- Depth: Unknown
- Colongitude: 293° at sunrise
- Formation: Pre-Nectarian
- Eponym: Nicolas-Claude; Fabri de Peiresc

Peirescius is a lunar impact crater that is located in the southeastern part of the Moon. It is close enough to the limb that it appears significantly foreshortened when viewed from the Earth, even though it is nearly circular in shape. To the west-northwest of Peirescius is the crater Vega, and less than one crater diameter to the south is Brisbane. Farther to the east is the Mare Australe.

On the lunar geologic timescale, this crater dates to the Pre-Nectarian epoch. The outer parts of this crater has become eroded by smaller impacts, and several small craterlets lie along the rim or the inner wall. These have taken their toll upon the original crater shape, although it is nowhere near as badly eroded as the nearby Vega. The interior floor is a relatively featureless expanse, with only a low rise in the center and a small craterlet toward the northern rim.

The crater was named in 1935 after Nicolas-Claude Fabri de Peiresc (1580–1637), the French astronomer, antiquary and savant.

== Satellite craters ==
By convention these features are identified on lunar maps by placing the letter on the side of the crater midpoint that is closest to Peirescius.

Peirescius	Latitude	Longitude	Diameter
A	45.2° S	71.3° E	15 km
B	45.6° S	70.5° E	18 km
C	46.2° S	71.5° E	41 km
D	48.1° S	71.9° E	43 km
G	48.1° S	67.7° E	25 km
H	45.3° S	73.1° E	8 km
J	45.1° S	66.8° E	15 km
