= Vega (crater) =

Crater on the Moon

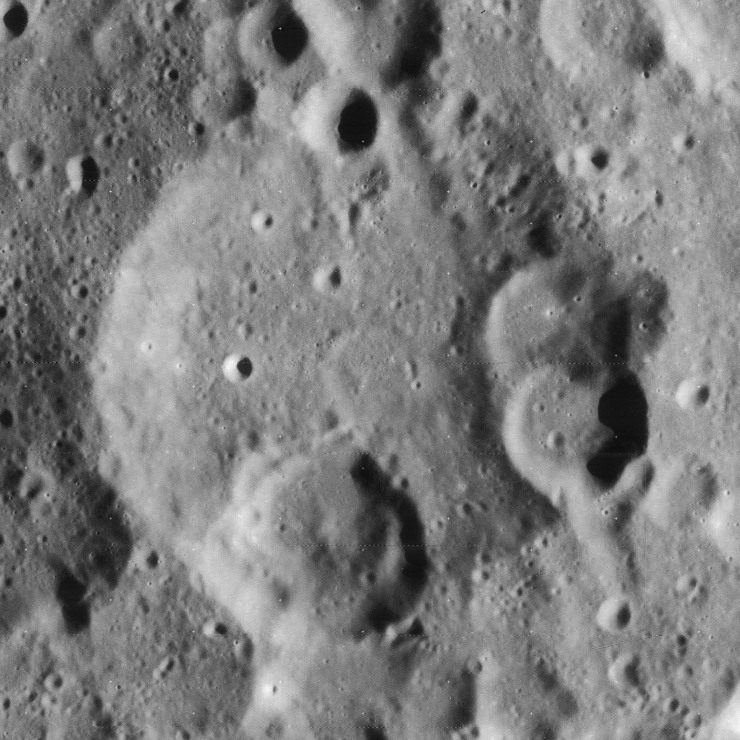
- Lunar Orbiter 4 image
- Coordinates: 45.4°S 63.4°E
- Diameter: 76 km
- Depth: 2.9 km
- Colongitude: 298° at sunrise
- Formation: Pre-Nectarian
- Eponym: Georg F. Von Vega

Vega is an eroded lunar impact crater that is located in the southeastern part of the Moon. It lies on the near side and so can be viewed from the Earth. Less than one crater diameter to the east-southeast is the slightly smaller Peirescius. About one and a half crater diameters to the west is the long Vallis Rheita.

On the lunar geologic timescale, this crater dates to the Pre-Nectarian epoch. It has been worn and eroded through a history of impacts. Vega B overlies the southern part of the southern floor and inner wall. The rim's east-northeastern section is overlain by a merged pair of small craters. A cluster of small craters lies along the northwestern rim. The remainder of the outer rim is round-shouldered and marked by many tiny impacts. The southern part interior floor is partly overlaid by the outer rampart of Vega B. The remainder of the floor is relatively featureless except for a few tiny craters.

This feature is named after the Slovenian mathematician Jurij Vega (Georg Freiherr von Vega in German).

== Satellite craters ==
By convention these features are identified on lunar maps by placing the letter on the side of the crater midpoint that is closest to Vega.

Vega	Latitude	Longitude	Diameter
A	47.2° S	65.3° E	12 km
B	46.2° S	63.5° E	30 km
C	45.2° S	64.8° E	21 km
D	44.7° S	64.3° E	25 km
G	44.4° S	62.4° E	11 km
H	44.5° S	60.1° E	6 km
J	45.6° S	59.9° E	19 km
