= Francesco Inghirami =

Italian architect and writer

Francesco Inghirami (1772–1846) was an Italian archeologist and author.

He was born to a prominent family from Volterra. His brother Giovanni (1779 – 1851) was a prominent astronomer and Catholic priest. His brother Marcello was a prominent alabaster sculptor. As a young man, Francesco fought in the Napoleonic wars in 1799. He then returned to Tuscany, where he began collecting mainly Etruscan antiquities. He founded a college at Fiesole. He published illustrations of some of his collections in his ten volume Monumenti etruschi (1820–1827), Galleria Omerica (also titled Raccolta di monumenti antichi esibita dal cav. Francesco Inghirami per servire allo studio dell'Illiade e dell'Odissea 3 volumes, 1829–1851), Pitture di vasi fittili (1831–1837), Museo etrusco chiusino (2 volumes, 1833), and the incomplete Storia della Toscana (1841–1845). He illustrated and engraved many if not most of the drawings for these texts.

== Gallery of Illustrations ==
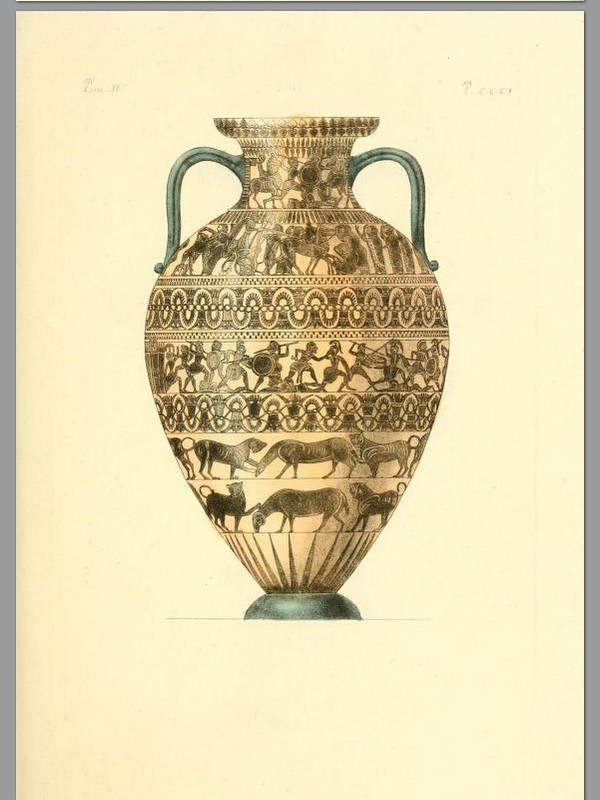
Illustration from Pitture di vasi Fittili

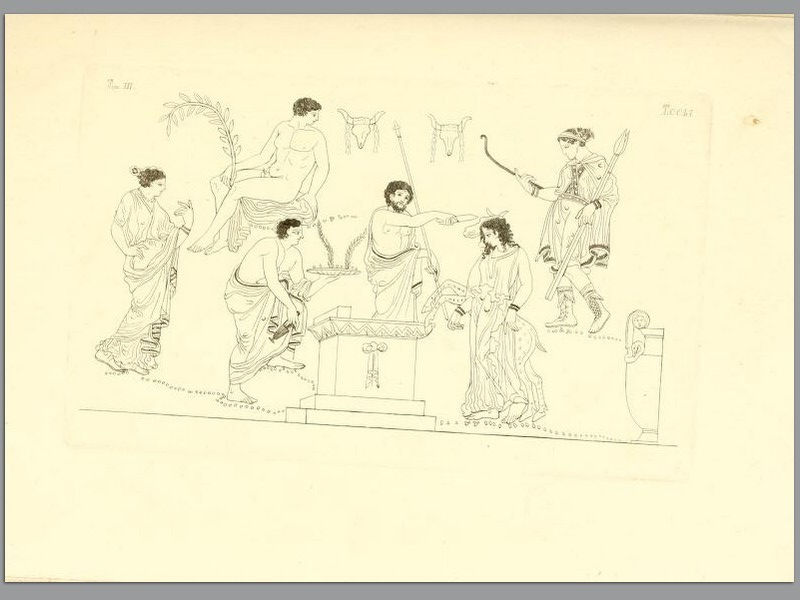
Illustration from Pitture di vasi Fittili

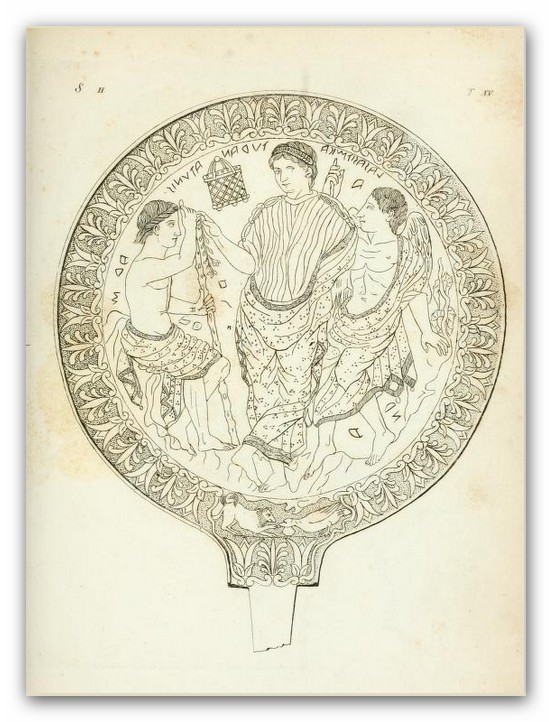
Illustration from Monumenti etruschi

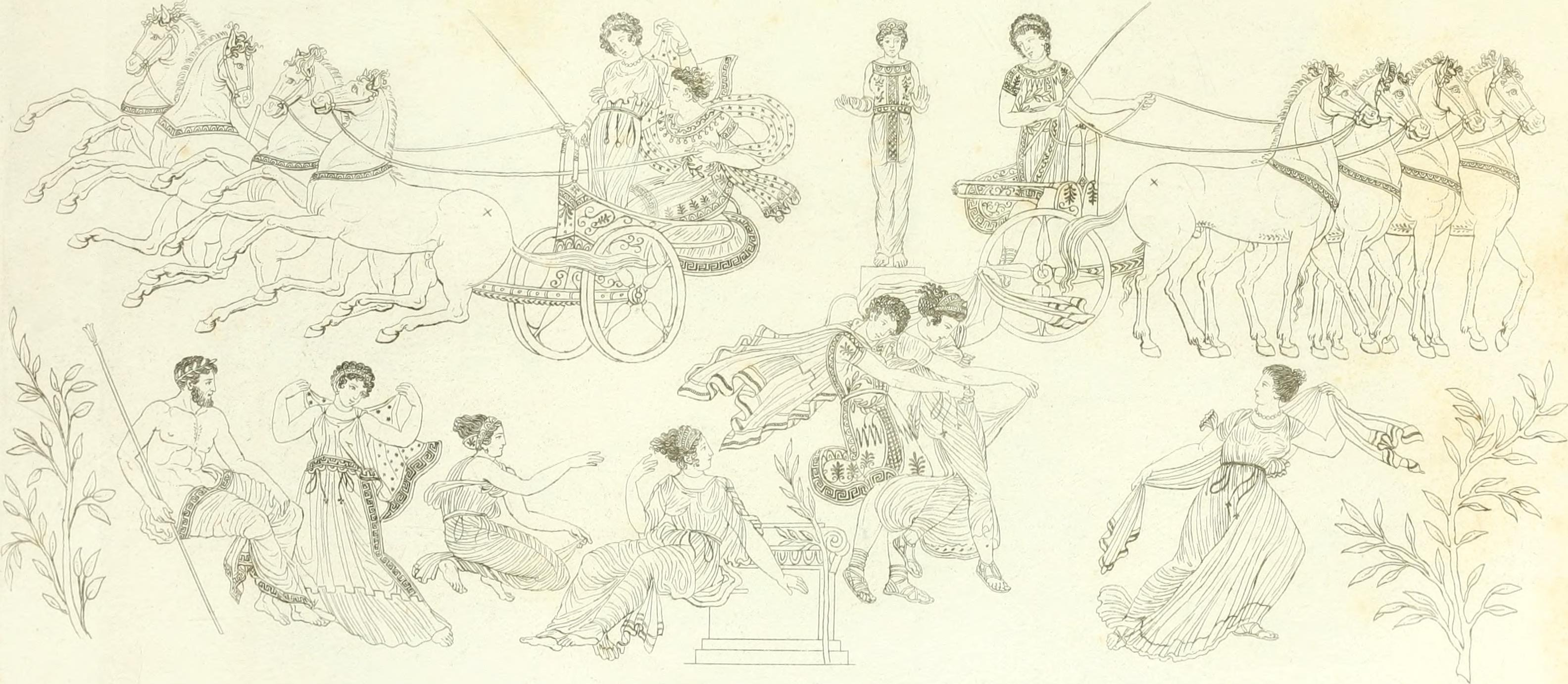
Illustration from Monumenti etruschi
