= Young (crater) =

Lunar crater

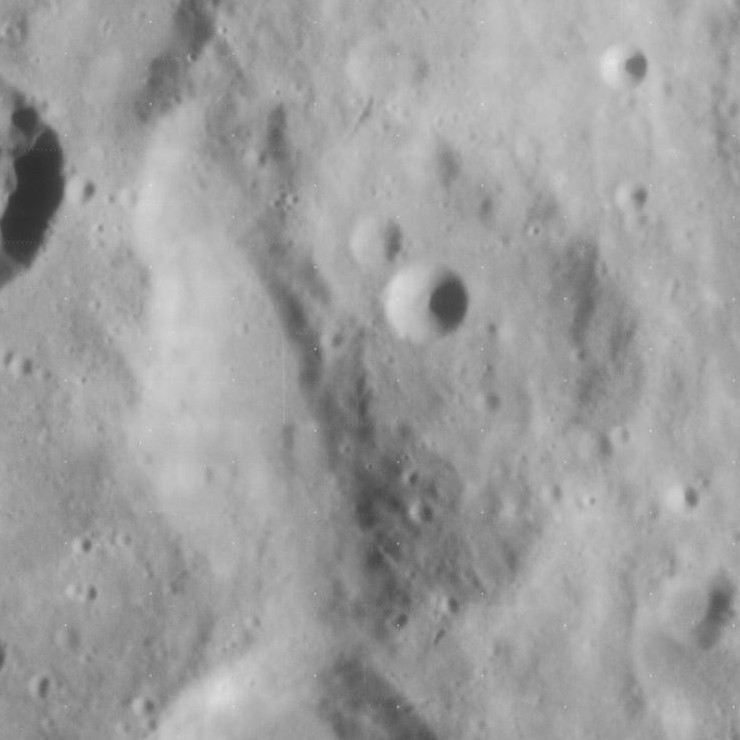
- Lunar Orbiter 4 image
- Coordinates: 41.5°S 50.9°E
- Diameter: 71 km
- Depth: 4.2 km
- Colongitude: 310° at sunrise
- Eponym: Thomas Young

Young is a lunar impact crater that is located in the rugged southeast part of the Moon's near side. It lies to the east of the crater Metius, and southeast of Rheita. The long Vallis Rheita follows a line tangential to the southwest rim of Rheita, and cuts a wide trough through the southwest floor and outer rim of Young.

The surviving part of the crater is a worn, eroded formation that has seen better times. The rim and inner wall can still be followed across the surface, but it is indented and notched by smaller impacts. The inner floor contains a pair of small, bowl-shaped craters designated Young A and Young B.

To the south of Young, the valley is overlain by Young D, a somewhat less eroded feature than Young. The valley continues intermittently to the southeast, spanning a total distance of about 500 kilometers. This is the longest valley on the near side of the Moon.

== Satellite craters ==
By convention these features are identified on lunar maps by placing the letter on the side of the crater midpoint that is closest to Young.

Young	Latitude	Longitude	Diameter
A	41.1° S	51.2° E	13 km
B	40.9° S	50.6° E	7 km
C	41.5° S	48.2° E	30 km
D	43.5° S	51.8° E	46 km
F	44.8° S	51.8° E	23 km
R	42.4° S	55.4° E	9 km
S	43.3° S	53.9° E	11 km
