= Anton Maria Schyrleus of Rheita =

Czech astronomer and optician (1604–1660)

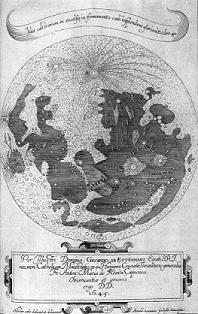
Schyrleus of Rheita's lunar map (1645)

Anton (or Antonius) Maria Schyrleus (also Schyrl, Schyrle) of Rheita (Czech: Antonín Maria Šírek z Reity; 1604–1660) was an astronomer and optician. He developed several inverting and erecting eyepieces, and was the maker of Kepler's telescope. "Things appear more alive with the binocular telescope," he wrote, "doubly as exact so to speak, as well as large and bright. His binocular telescope is the precursor to our binoculars.

== Biography ==
Two different stories exist about Schyrle's early life. The most popular account holds that he is of Czech origin, born in 1597. According to this story he was a priest and a member of the order of Capuchin friars at Rheita, Bohemia (today Rejta, a suburb of Trhové Sviny), hence "of Rheita". At the outbreak of the Thirty Years' War in 1618, he left the order and established himself in Belgium.

The other, more probable account, starts in 1604, when Schyrleus is born in Reutte, Austria. After joining the Augustine order in 1622, he is sent to the university at Ingolstadt, where he probably follows courses in astronomy and learns how to grind lenses. Following his graduation he does not return to his convent but enters the Capuchin order, which sends him to Linz in 1636 where he is to teach philosophy. Here, he comes in the service of Kurfürst Philipp Christoph von Sötern, the archbishop of Trier and Speyer, who is held captive by the Emperor Ferdinand III. The archbishop sends him on a mission to negotiate with Pope Urban VIII. The emperor however, seeing this diplomatic activity as a form of spying, bans Schyrleus from his lands in 1641. From here on, both accounts of Schyrleus' life come together.

In the 1640s he was a professor of philosophy at Trier. In 1642, he was in Cologne conducting astronomical observations and optical measurements, and in 1643 his work Novem stellae circa Jovem visae, circa Saturnum sex, circa Martem nonnullae ("Nine stars seen around Jupiter, six around Saturn, several around Mars") appeared. In 1645, he published Oculus Enoch et Eliae, siue, Radius sidereomysticus, a very influential work on optics and astronomy.

== Optics ==
In Oculus Enoch et Eliae, besides describing one of his inventions, an eyepiece for a Keplerian telescope, which left the image reverted, it also contained a long section on binocular telescopes, which greatly influenced other telescope-makers and opticians in the next century. His section on binocular telescopes is not illustrated, but the methods he describes became the standard construction techniques for many years.

Another engraving in this book may show a lens grinding machine.

== Astronomical observations ==
Schyrleus was a determined anticopernican. In the foreword of its book, which includes a dedication to Jesus Christ and Ferdinand III, Schyrleus boldly declared that after having meditated for a long time on the systems of Ptolemy, Copernicus, Tycho Brahe, and other astronomers, he was convinced that all of these scientists had advanced superfluous theories. He dedicated the moons of Jupiter to Pope Urban VIII, calling them Astres Urbanoctavianes. He also wrote that Saturn had two "companions," and that they were periodically eclipsed by the planet. He deduced that they had their own independent orbits, and that they illuminated Saturn, which needed light as it was a hundred times less lit by the sun than the Earth. He tells us that in 1642, in Cologne, he saw pass in front of the Sun a troop (turnam) of shooting stars that followed one another during a period fourteen days, and that the glare of the Sun was considerably weakened by it.

In regard to extraterrestrial life, Schyrleus wrote, "If Jupiter has…inhabitants…they must be larger and more beautiful than the inhabitants of the Earth, in proportion to the [size] of the two spheres." However, he did not dare to confirm the existence of Jovian beings due to certain theological difficulties; Schyrleus wondered, for example, if beings on other planets maintained their primitive state of innocence, or if they are cursed by original sin like humans are.

== The Moon ==
Schyrleus also included a map of the Moon in Oculus Enoch et Eliae. It was the first depiction of the Moon as seen in an inverting telescope (and thus the Moon itself is inverted in the illustration, with the South Pole at the top). The crater Tycho, for example, was depicted on lunar maps as early as 1645, when Schyrleus depicted the bright ray system. His map, however, did not come into standard use, as it was superseded by those made by Hevelius and the Jesuits Giovanni Battista Riccioli and Francesco Maria Grimaldi (1650–1651). In 1647, Schyrleus published a lunar chart with a diameter of 19 cm.

He may have spent some time in Italy, but it is certain that he died at Ravenna. It is unknown why he was there at the time.

== Legacy ==
He is credited with bringing into the scientific lexicon the terms "ocular" and "objective" (as used in optics). The lunar crater Rheita is named after him. By extension, the lunar valley Vallis Rheita, where the crater stands at the valley's northwestern end, is also named after Schyrleus.

== See also ==
- List of Roman Catholic scientist-clerics
