= Michael Neander =

German teacher, mathematician, medical academic and astronomer

Michael Neander (originally Neumann) (April 3, 1529 – October 23, 1581) was a German teacher, mathematician, medical academic, and astronomer.

He was born in Joachimsthal, Bohemia, and was educated at the University of Wittenberg, receiving his B.A. in 1549 and M.A. in 1550.

From 1551 until 1561 he taught mathematics and astronomy in Jena, Germany. He became a professor in 1558 when the school where he taught became a university. From 1560 until his death he was a professor of medicine at the University of Jena.

He died in Jena, Germany. The crater Neander on the Moon is named after him.
