= Neander Lake =

Lake in the state of Minnesota, United States

- Location within Minnesota
- Location: Chisago County, Minnesota
- Coordinates: 45°37′36″N 93°2′53″W
- Type: lake

Neander Lake is a lake in Chisago County, Minnesota, in the United States.

Neander Lake was named for Nels P. Neander, a pioneer settler.

== See also ==
- List of lakes in Minnesota
