= Karen Neander =

Philosopher of cognitive science (1954–2020)

- Born: March 24, 1954
- Died: May 6, 2020 (aged 66)
- Education: La Trobe University
- Known for: Philosophy of biology, Philosophy of mind
- Scientific career
- Fields: Philosophy, Cognitive science
- Thesis: (1984)

Karen Neander (March 24, 1954 – May 6, 2020) was a philosopher and professor at Duke University. She was known for her work in philosophy of mind, philosophy of language, philosophy of action, philosophy of biology, philosophy of neuroscience and cognitive science.

== Biography ==
Karen Neander obtained her PhD at La Trobe University in 1984 with a dissertation on the concept of mental illness. During her career, she worked at the University of Sydney, the University of Adelaide, the Australian National University (1988–1995), and Johns Hopkins University (1996–2006). In 2006, she joined the department of philosophy at Duke University, where she remained until her death, from cancer in 2020.

== Publications, a selection ==
- 2017. A Mark of the Mental: A Defence of Informational Teleosemantics. MIT Press.
- Journal and other papers
