= Reichenbach (crater) =

Crater on the Moon

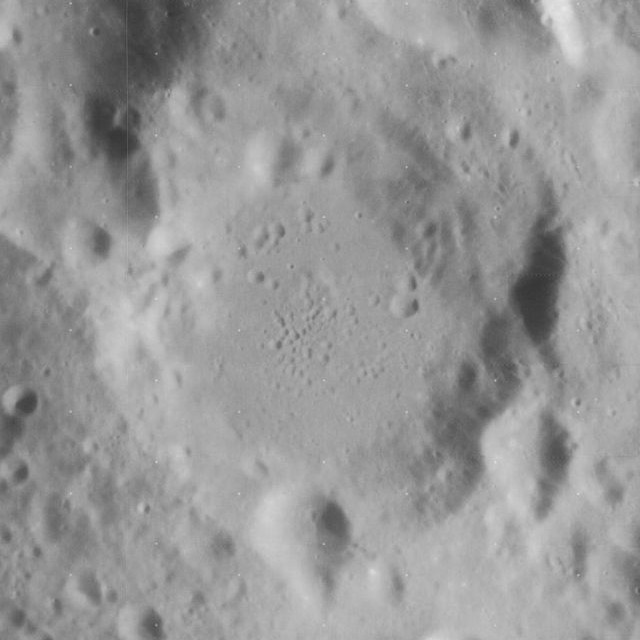
- Lunar Orbiter 4 image
- Coordinates: 30.3°S 48.0°E
- Diameter: 71 km
- Depth: 3.2 km
- Colongitude: 313° at sunrise
- Eponym: Georg von Reichenbach

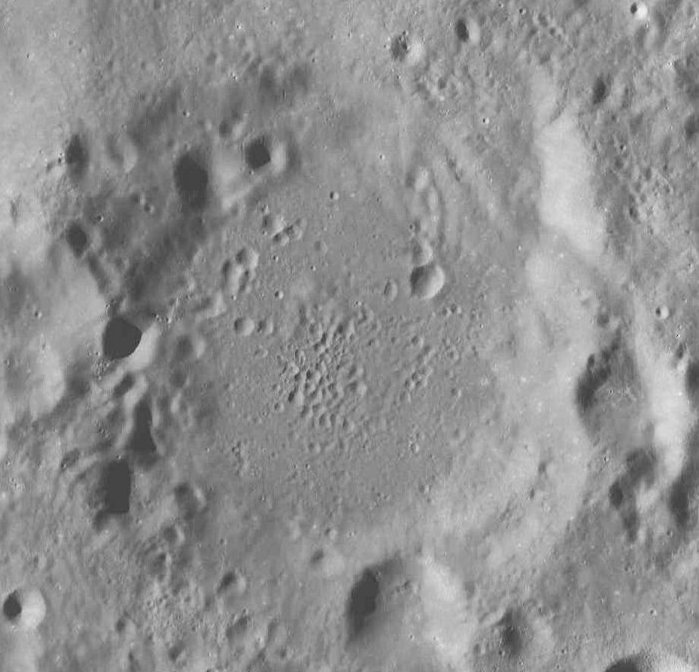
LRO image

Reichenbach is a crater in the rugged southeastern part of the Moon's near side. It is located to the west-northwest of the prominent crater Stevinus, and to the west of Snellius.

The rugged rim of this crater has been heavily worn by impact erosion. The rim is wider along the northern side, and has a slightly distorted appearance. A number of small craters lie along the rim, including Reichenbach F along the southern side. The nearly level interior floor is nearly featureless, with only a small craterlet near the northeastern inner wall.

== Satellite craters ==
By convention these features are identified on lunar maps by placing the letter on the side of the crater midpoint that is closest to Reichenbach.

Reichenbach	Latitude	Longitude	Diameter
A	28.3° S	49.0° E	34 km
B	28.4° S	48.0° E	44 km
C	29.3° S	43.9° E	27 km
D	28.1° S	44.7° E	35 km
F	31.4° S	48.4° E	15 km
G	31.7° S	49.4° E	15 km
H	28.9° S	49.7° E	10 km
J	30.7° S	49.4° E	15 km
K	28.8° S	42.4° E	11 km
L	30.5° S	46.7° E	8 km
M	33.0° S	46.5° E	13 km
N	30.5° S	43.9° E	14 km
P	32.0° S	49.9° E	12 km
Q	32.4° S	50.2° E	10 km
R	26.9° S	42.9° E	7 km
S	27.1° S	43.1° E	9 km
T	29.3° S	45.7° E	64 km
U	32.7° S	49.5° E	14 km
W	30.7° S	43.1° E	18 km
X	30.9° S	43.9° E	11 km
Y	31.2° S	43.6° E	16 km
Z	31.9° S	46.0° E	15 km
