= Vallis Inghirami =

Lunar surface depression

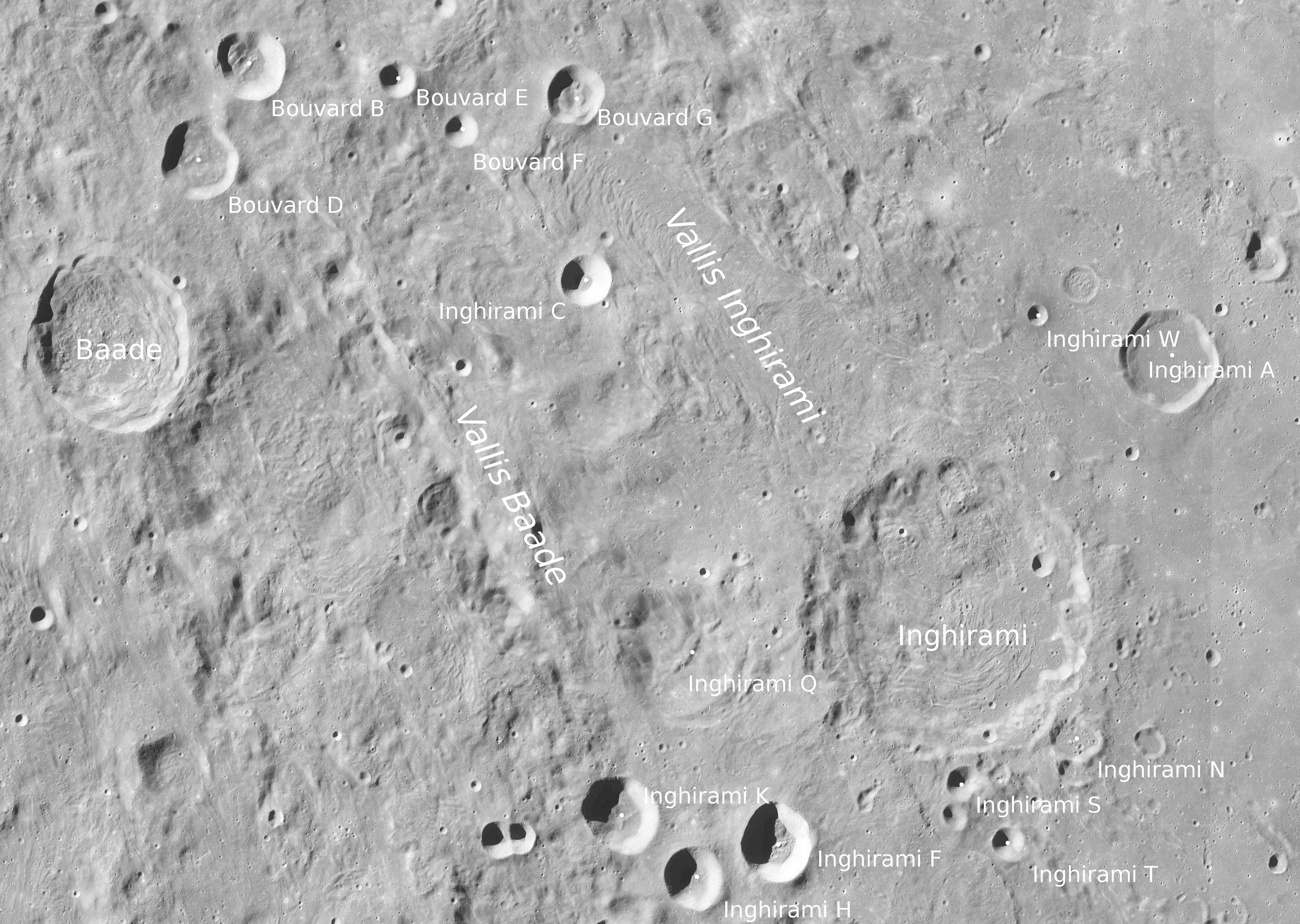
- Vallis Inghirami seen beside Inghirami crater
- Length: 140 km

Geography
- Coordinates: 43.8°S 72.2°W
- Interactive map of Vallis Inghirami

Vallis Inghirami (Latin for Inghirami Valley) is a valley on the Moon. Diameter of the valley is about 145 km. It is named after Giovanni Inghirami, and the name was approved by IAU in 1964. The valley trends from Mare Orientale to the crater Inghirami.
