= Ernst Neumann-Neander =

German artist and inventor

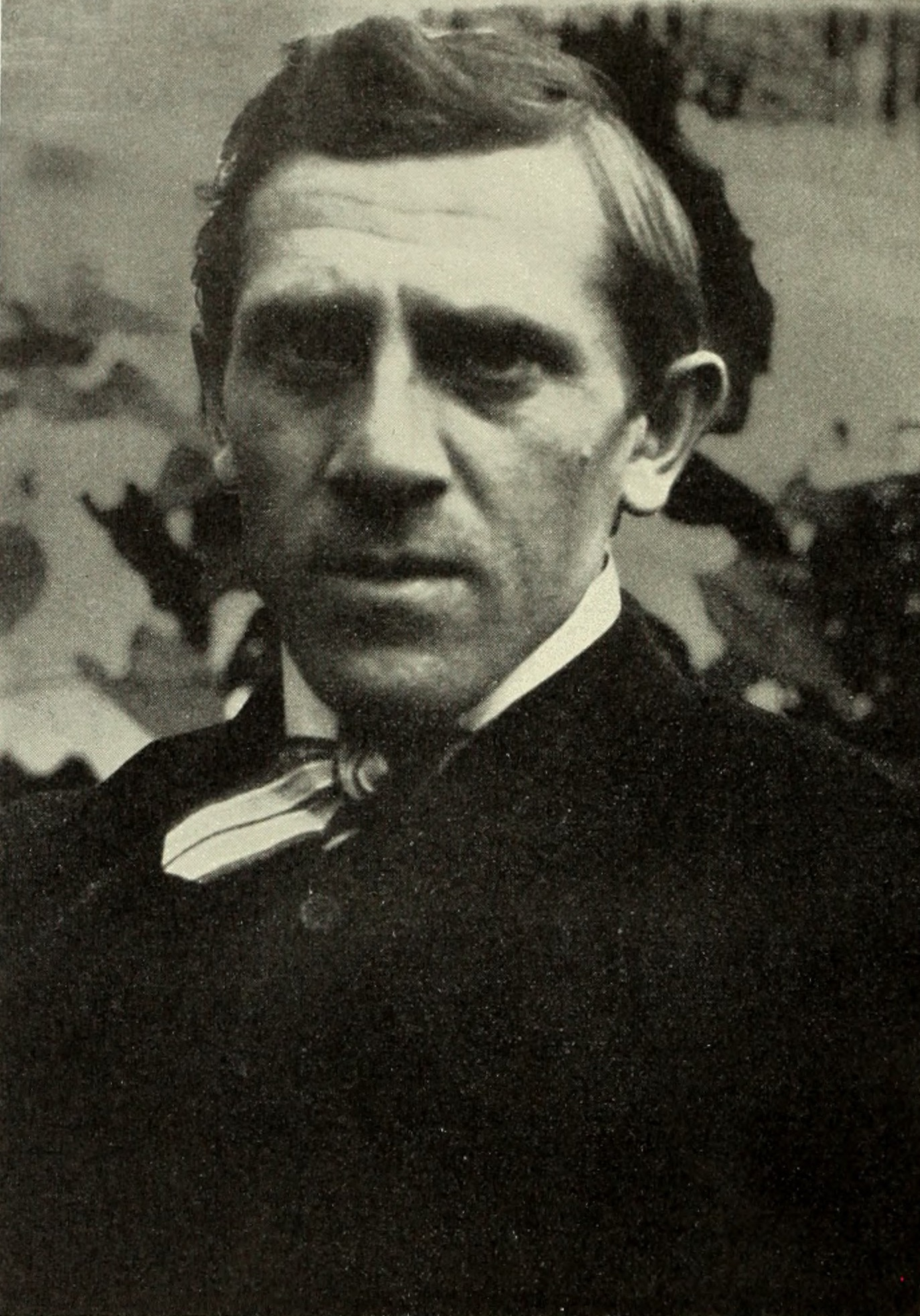
- Ernst Neumann-Neander in 1905
- Born: September 3, 1871; Kassel
- Died: November 3, 1954 (aged 83); Düren

Ernst Neumann-Neander (3 September 1871 - 3 November 1954) was a German artist and inventor.

== Life and work ==
Ernst Neumann-Neander, son of the landscape painter Emil Neumann, became famous not only as a painter and graphic artist but mainly as a designer of automobiles and motor yachts and a motorcycle-loving designer of motorcycles. Between 1903 and 1908 built his first motorcycle.

Neumann-Neander, known to friends and acquaintances because of his versatility, "N²" studied painting in Kassel, Munich, and Paris. During his time in Munich, he mainly drew caricatures of modern life for the magazines Jugend and Simplicissimus. As a draftsman and poster designer of Art Nouveau, he quickly gained a reputation far beyond Munich. He participated in the Schwabing cabaret Elf Scharfrichter and founded it together with the graphic artist Heinrich Wolff's painting and drawing school. In 1903, he went to Paris for about five years, where he came into contact with the then important figures in the automotive industry.

In 1908 Neumann settled in Berlin and founded the "Ateliers Neumann", which designed advertisements for all major manufacturers of automobiles, but also for other branches of industry. In addition, he drew car bodies for various clients that were executed according to his designs.

Similar to other artists of his time, the painter and commercial artist Neumann also formed an artist group; In his “Atelier Ernst Neumann” in Berlin, he formed an artist community with the fresco painter and illustrator August Braun. One of his students was the artist Else Hertzer, who from 1918 was represented with her pictures at the Berlin Secession.

In 1914 the Neumanns' designs and vehicles were shown at the Werkbund Exhibition in Cologne. He eventually lost his fortune due to the First World War and the inflation that followed.

Ernst Neumann-Neander is buried in the cemetery in Rölsdorf.

== Motor vehicle production ==
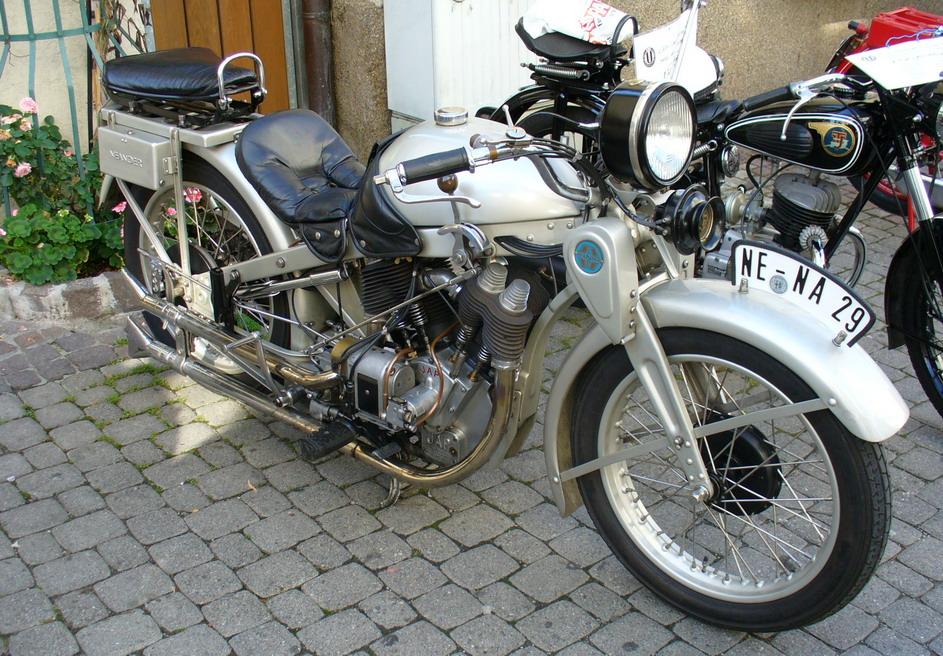
Neumann-Neander, motorcycle Neander 1929, Opel.

While still in Berlin, he designed his first motorcycle Neander. In 1924 he moved to Cologne and founded Neander Motorfahrzeug GmbH, based in Euskirchen. Here he builds and designs motorcycles for the Allright factory and for himself, which take part in the first major sporting event after the war. Neumann is the oldest participant in the race and reaches the finish in Cologne after driving over 2000 km through Germany through ice and snow. From Cologne, he started a motorcycle production in Euskirchen and moved to Düren in 1926.

In the 1930s he worked on the development and construction of so-called driving machines, a mixture of motorcycle and automobile. The Second World War wrecked everything. Nevertheless, Ernst Neumann continued to design and develop both a curve tilting device and vehicles for disabled people. In 1951 he began to paint again.

In Rölsdorf, there is a memorial plaque on the Macherey-Nagel factory building at the corner of Bahnstrasse and Neumann-Neander-Strasse. The "Neander Shed" in which the constructions were made still stands today.

== Literature ==
- Hermann Esswein: Ernst Neumann. Moderne Illustratoren Bd. 6. Piper, München 1905
- Franz Joseph Hall: Lichtquellen aus dem Geist. Frank Wedekind und Ernst Neumann-Neander. Pendragon, Bielefeld 1990 (Jahresgabe des Pendragon-Verlages für die Freunde des Verlages zum Jahreswechsel; 1990/91)
- Reinhold Kraft u. a. (Hrsg.): Ernst Neumann-Neander 1871 – 1954. [Ausstellungen anlässlich des 50. Todestages von Ernst Neumann; Das technische Werk: 28. Mai bis 3. Oktober 2004 im Deutschen Zweiradmuseum, Neckarsulm; Das künstlerische Werk: 4. September bis 24. Oktober 2004 im Otto-Junker-Haus, Hürtgenwald-Simonskall; 19. September bis 7. November 2004 im Leopold-Hoesch-Museum, Düren]. Hahne und Schloemer, Düren 2004, ISBN 3-927312-66-5
- E. Neumann-Neander: Tagebuch der Zerstörung. Düren im November und Dezember 1944. Düren 1994, ISBN 3-929096-09-9
- Roland Opschondek (1999). "Neumann, Ernst". Neue Deutsche Biographie (in German). Vol. 19. Berlin: Duncker & Humblot. pp. 143–144. (full text online).
- Thomas Trapp: Ernst Neumann Neander und seine Motorräder. Bonn 1996, 2. Auflage 2001, ISBN 3-89365-546-8
- Thomas Trapp: Ernst Neumann Neander und seine Fahrmaschinen. 2002, ISBN 3-89880-041-5
- Rölsdorfer Geschichte(n), herausgegeben anlässlich des 125-jährigen Bestehens der Schützenbruderschaft Constantia 1877 e.V., 2002, S. 267–290
- Siegfried Rauch; Frank Rönicke: Männer und Motorräder – ein Jahrhundert deutscher Motorradentwicklung. Stuttgart: Motorbuch-Verlag 2008, ISBN 978-3-613-02947-7, S. 112–121
- Neumann, Ernst, in: Detlef Lorenz: Reklamekunst um 1900. Künstlerlexikon für Sammelbilder. Berlin : Reimer, 2000 ISBN 3-496-01220-X, S. 144f.

== Collections ==
- Victoria and Albert Museum

== Exhibitions ==
- 2009 Ernst Neumann-Neander's Driving Machine. PROTOTYP Museum.
- 2021 Ernst Neumann-Neander: The better is the good enemy. Rheinische Museum.
