= Neander (motorcycle) =

Motorcycle designed by Ernst Neumann

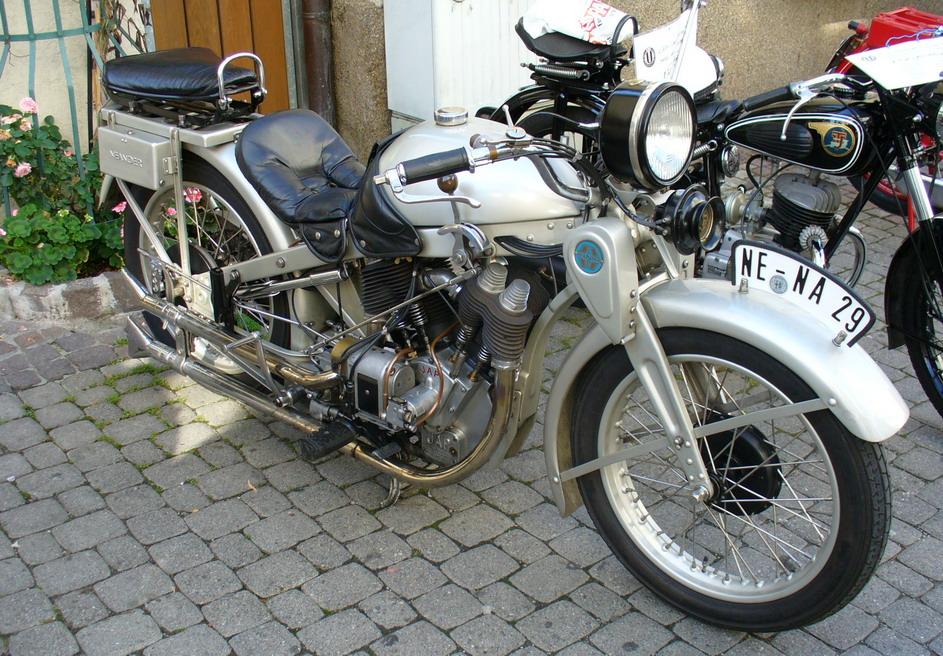
1929 Neander motorcycle

The Neander motorcycle was designed by Ernst Neumann-Neander, who made his name first as a painter and graphic artist, and later turned to motorcycle and car design. He went into production in 1928 under the Neander name, and changing his own name to Ernst Neumann-Neander, a doubling of the German and Greek words for 'new man'.

Neumann-Neander designed and built a series of unusual prototype and racing motorcycles. He used lightweight pressed-aluminum beam frames from which the motors hung, and unique pivoting forks that used a spring box near the steering head. In 1926, he founded Neander Motorfahrzeug GmbH in Düren and went into production, using a pressed-steel frame that was cadmium plated instead of his aluminum prototypes. These novel frames housed a variety of motors, from small 122cc Villiers two-strokes to 350cc and 500cc single-cylinder engines by Küchen, to large v-twins by J.A.P. and Motosacoche. The Neander motorcycle had futuristic styling, with a curved, padded leather seat behind an egg-shaped fuel tank, and very clean lines. With excellent handling from the pressed-steel frame, Neanders won quite a few races, and have a very comfortable, stable, and predictable ride. Neander also designed a sleek, torpedo-shaped sidecar to accompany his motorcycles.

In 1929, the Opel automobile factory licensed the Neander design, and built the Opel Motoclub in 1929 and 1930 only. Fritz von Opel famously attached a series of rockets to an Opel Motoclub in 1930 as a publicity stunt. There was also a briefly licensed Neander sold under the E-O (Elite-Opel) name in 1931.

It is estimated that around 2000 Neander motorcycles were built, before Neumann-Neander turned his attention to a series of experimental 'Fahrmaschinen' small cars with motorcycle engines (1934–39), motorcycles with differential wheel sizes (1937–40), and a few final experiments in 1947-49 with two, three, and four-wheelers.
