= Rheita (crater) =

Crater on the Moon

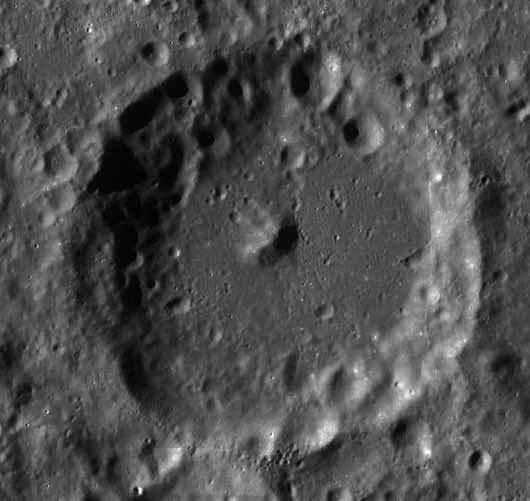
- LRO mosaic
- Coordinates: 37.1°S 47.2°E
- Diameter: 70 km
- Depth: 4.3 km
- Colongitude: 314° at sunrise
- Formation: Nectarian
- Eponym: Anton M. S. of Rheita

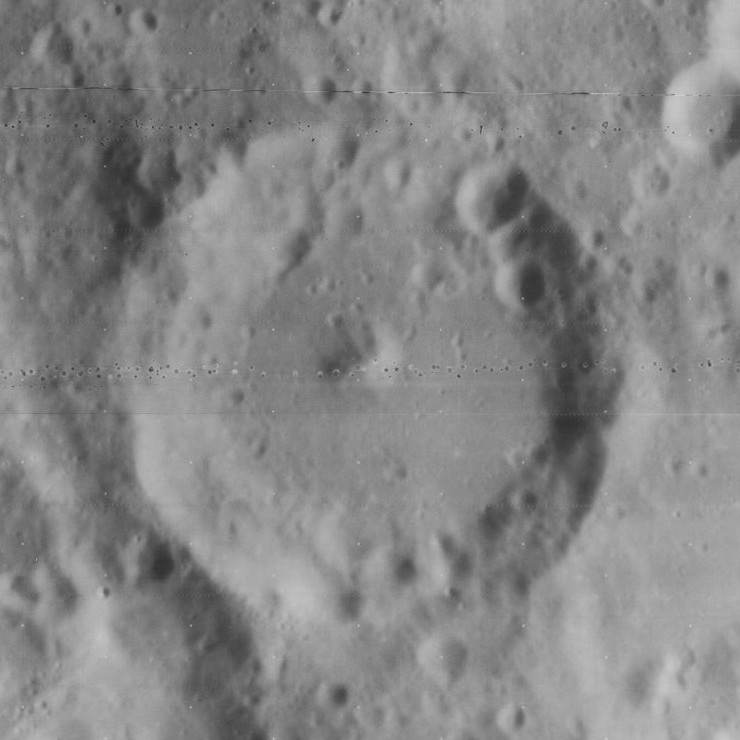
Lunar Orbiter 4 image

Rheita is a lunar impact crater located in the southwestern sector of the Moon. It was named after Czech astronomer and optician Anton Maria Schyrleus of Rheita. It lies to the northeast of the crater Metius, and northwest of Young. The southwestern rim overlies the edge of Vallis Rheita, a long lunar valley stretching for over 200 kilometers on a line running northeast to southwest. At its widest the valley is 25 kilometers wide and a kilometer deep.

The rim of Rheita remains well-defined with a sharp lip and a terraced inner wall. The rim overlaps a slightly smaller crater to the east, and has a pair of small impact craters in the northern wall. The crater floor is flat and it has a central peak.

Rheita is a crater of Nectarian age.

== Satellite craters ==
By convention these features are identified on lunar maps by placing the letter on the side of the crater midpoint that is closest to Rheita. It has overlapping craters.

Rheita	Latitude	Longitude	Diameter
A	38.0° S	50.0° E	11 km
B	39.1° S	52.8° E	21 km
C	35.1° S	44.2° E	8 km
D	39.1° S	50.1° E	6 km
E	34.2° S	49.1° E	66 x 32 km
F	35.4° S	48.4° E	14 km
G	40.5° S	54.3° E	15 km
H	39.8° S	51.7° E	7 km
L	37.7° S	52.9° E	10 km
M	35.5° S	50.1° E	25 km
N	35.1° S	49.5° E	8 km
P	37.9° S	44.4° E	11 km
