= Inghirami (crater) =

Lunar impact crater

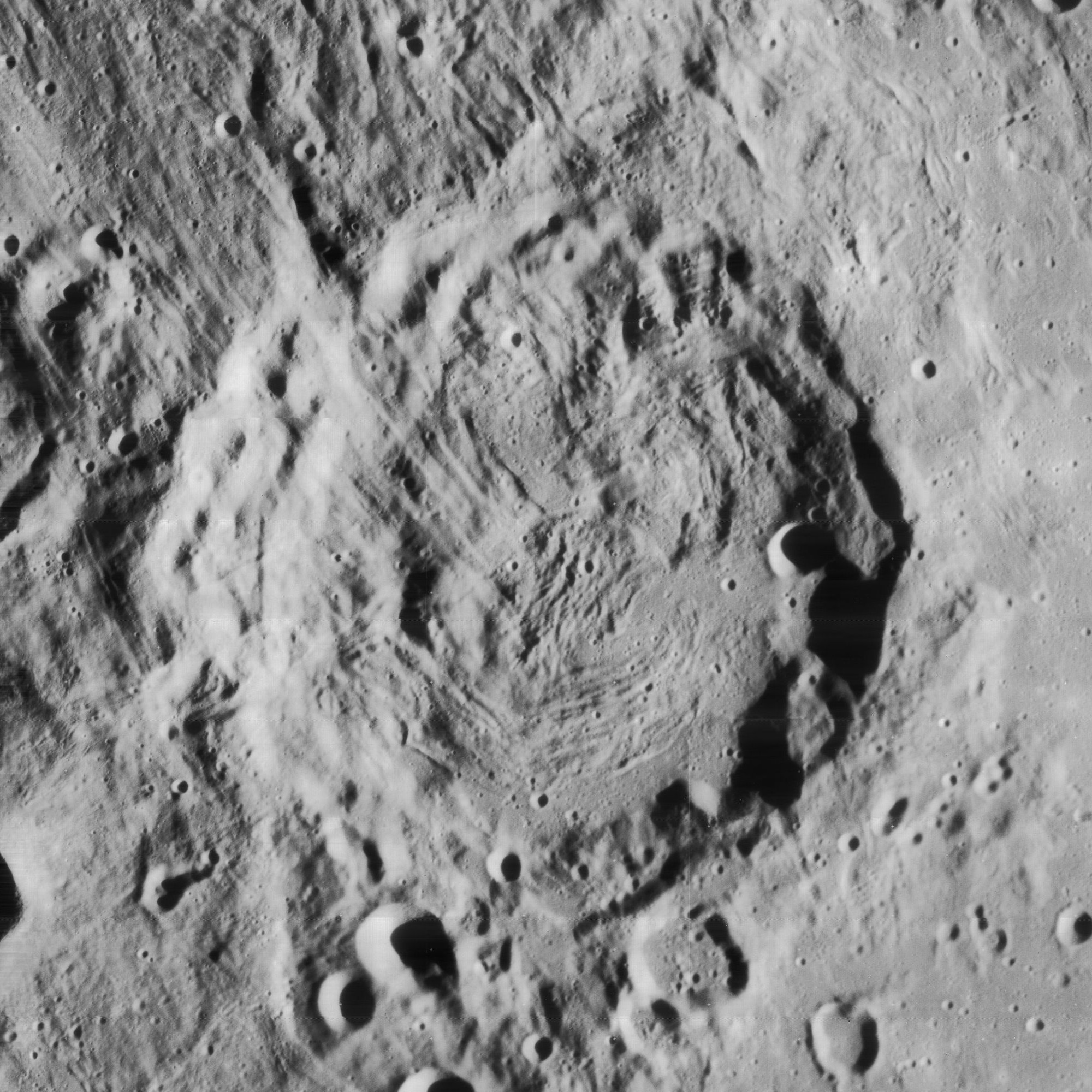
- Lunar Orbiter 4 image
- Coordinates: 47.49°S 68.95°W
- Diameter: 94.60 km
- Depth: 3.0 km
- Colongitude: 70° at sunrise
- Formation: Nectarian
- Eponym: Giovanni Inghirami

Inghirami is a lunar impact crater that is located toward the southwestern limb of the Moon. It lies to the southwest of a large walled plain called Schickard. Northwest of Inghirami is the wide Vallis Inghirami, a wide, straight valley that is radial to the Mare Orientale impact basin. The valley has a length of about 140 kilometers and ends at the northern edge of the crater.

Inghirami is located near the southeastern edge of the immense skirt of ejecta that surrounds the Mare Orientale. This material has formed linear ridges and valleys that continue across most of the crater rim and interior from the northwestern face. Much of the outer rim has been modified by this impact material, and the most intact part of the rim lies along the southeast edge.

The partly buried rim of this crater is roughly circular and somewhat irregular. There are some shelves and terraces along the sides, but these features are moderately eroded. A few small craters lie along or near the rim. The most notable crater on the interior floor is a small impact beside the eastern inner wall. The interior floor retains its ridges, streaky appearance across much of the crater, with only an area by the eastern rim being relatively flat and featureless.

Inghirami is a crater of Nectarian age. Inghirami lies to the east of the Mendel-Rydberg Basin, a 630 km wide impact basin also of Nectarian age.

The crater was named after Giovanni Inghirami by the IAU in 1935.

== Bright satellite craters Inghirami F, Inghirami H, and Inghirami K ==
Of crater Inghirami itself is as good as nothing detectable during and after full moon. To recognize the region of Inghirami, the cluster of bright satellite craters Inghirami F, Inghirami H, and Inghirami K, immediately southwest of Inghirami, is a guide to get acquainted with the craters southwest of the large walled plain Schickard. The bright appearance of the trio Inghirami F, H, and K is also noticeable on the photographic version of chart LAC 124 (page 248) in The Clementine Atlas of the Moon (Ben Bussey / Paul D. Spudis). Inghirami's bright cluster is only observable during very favourable libration of the moon's southwestern limb regions.

== Satellite craters ==
By convention these features are identified on lunar maps by placing the letter on the side of the crater midpoint that is closest to Inghirami.

Inghirami	Latitude	Longitude	Diameter
A	44.9° S	65.3° W	34 km
C	44.1° S	74.5° W	18 km
F	49.8° S	71.4° W	23 km
G	51.1° S	74.1° W	29 km
H	50.2° S	72.7° W	18 km
K	49.6° S	73.9° W	23 km
L	46.0° S	61.0° W	13 km
M	45.6° S	60.3° W	14 km
N	48.9° S	66.8° W	14 km
Q	48.0° S	72.9° W	42 km
S	49.3° S	68.4° W	11 km
T	49.8° S	67.8° W	9 km
W	44.4° S	67.4° W	68 km
