= Vallis Snellius =

Lunar valley

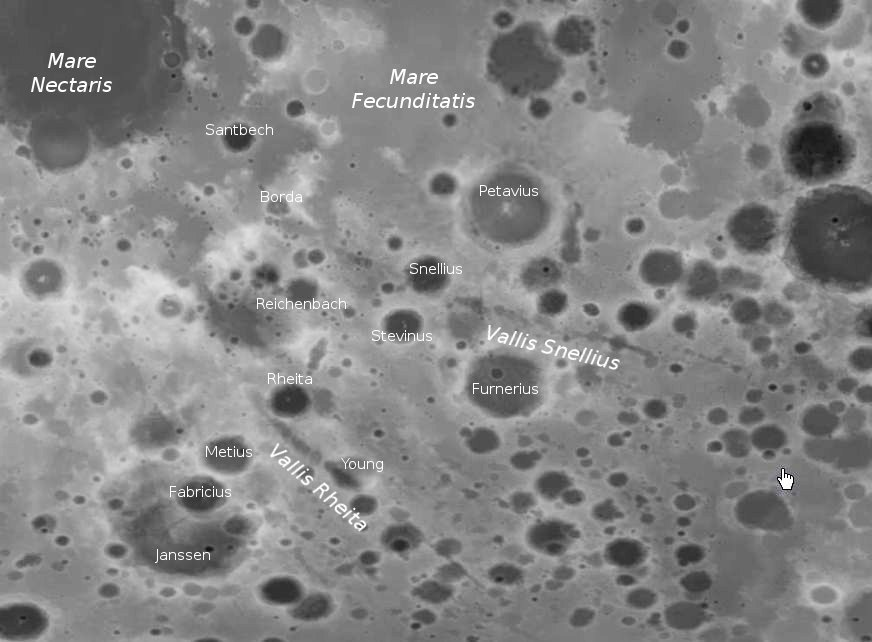
Vallis Snellius and Vallis Rheita (detail of LRO map)

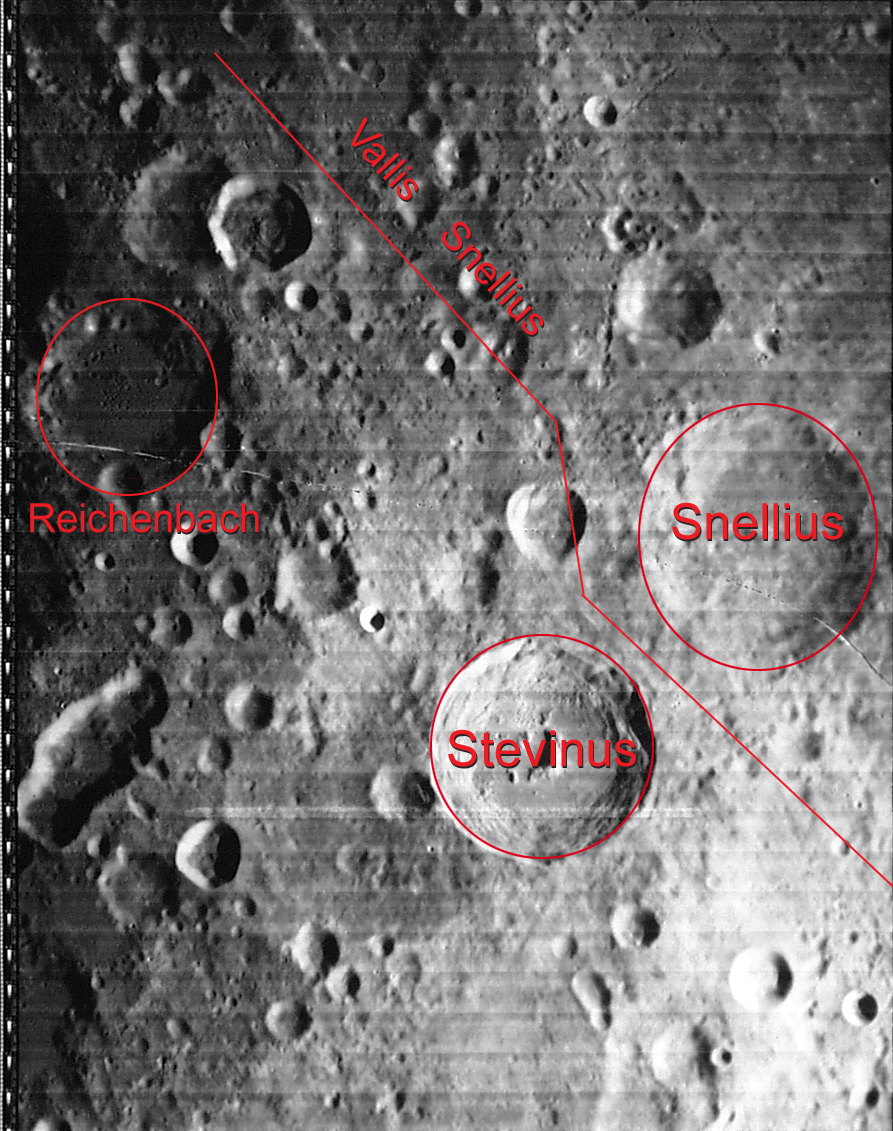
斯内利厄斯月谷

Vallis Snellius is a linear valley on the near side of the Moon. It is located in the rugged southeastern part of the visible surface, to the south of the Mare Fecunditatis. This feature is radial to the Mare Nectaris basin to the west-northwest, much like Vallis Rheita to the southwest, and the two likely share a common origin. It has a maximum length of 592 km (368 mi), making it the longest named valley on the Moon. The selenographic coordinates of this feature are 31.1°S 56.0°E

Although linear, this valley is irregular in shape and has been heavily worn by impact erosion, making it difficult to trace across the surface. The crater Snellius from which it is named, lies across the valley. The valley cuts through the southern half of the crater floor. Near the northern part of the valley is the crater Borda.
