= Colombo (crater) =

Lunar impact crater

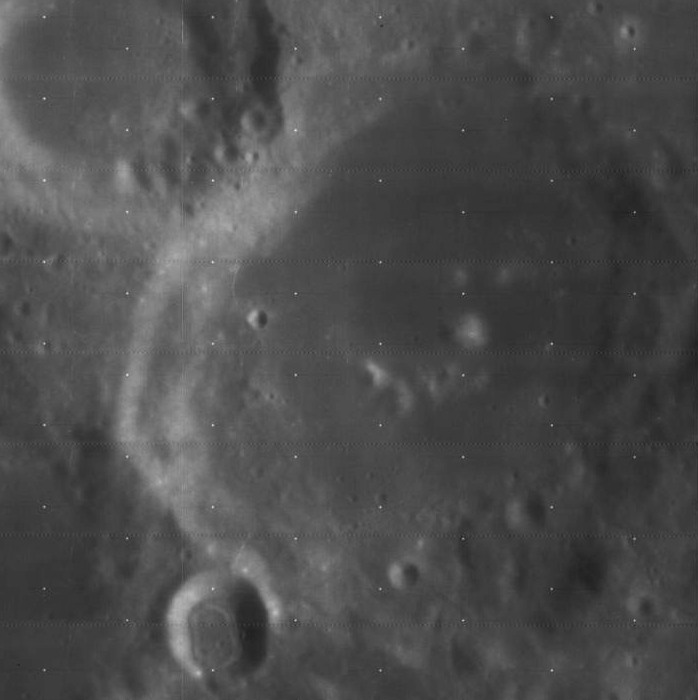
- Lunar Orbiter 4 image
- Coordinates: 15.26°S 46.02°E
- Diameter: 79.02 km (49.10 mi)
- Depth: 2.4 km (1.5 mi)
- Colongitude: 315° at sunrise
- Eponym: Christopher Columbus

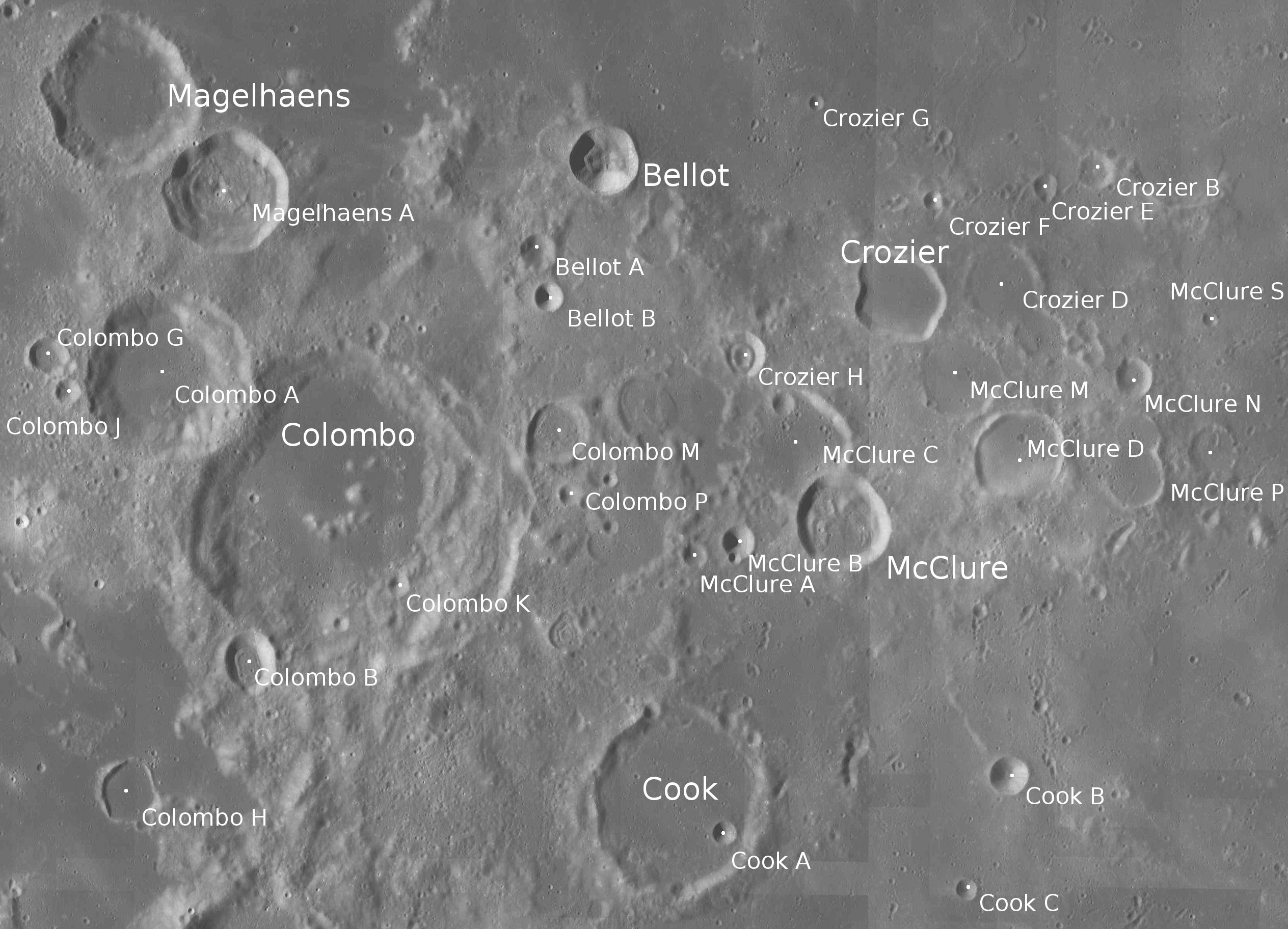
Colombo satellite features and surroundings

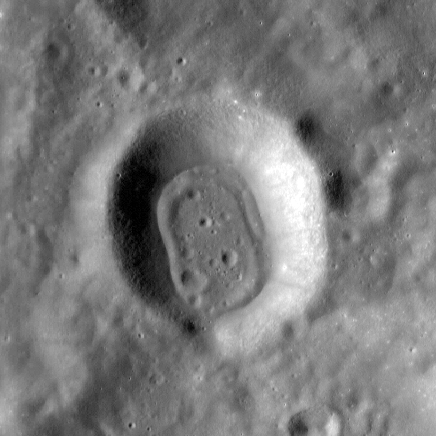
Satellite crater Colombo B, LRO image

Colombo is a lunar impact crater that lies on the strip of rough continental terrain between Mare Fecunditatis to the east and Mare Nectaris in the west. It is located to the south of the crater Goclenius, and northwest of Cook.

The rim of Colombo is circular, although slightly indented along the northwest where Colombo A intrudes slightly into the interior. The inner wall is asymmetrical, being much more narrow to the north and northwest and wider to the southeast. The eastern inner wall is broad and complex. The rim is somewhat eroded, and several tiny craterlets lie along the inner wall to the southeast. The small satellite concentric crater Colombo B lies across the south-southwestern rim. There is a small group of central peaks, on which infrared spectrum of pure crystalline plagioclase has been identified.

This formation is named for the Italian-Spanish explorer Christopher Columbus (1451-1506). His name was introduced in the lunar nomenclature of Johann H. von Mädler during the 19th century. Its designation was formally adopted by the International Astronomical Union in 1935.

== Satellite craters ==
By convention these features are identified on lunar maps by placing the letter on the side of the crater midpoint that is closest to Colombo.

Colombo	Coordinates	Diameter
A	14.18°S 44.46°E	40.8 km
B	16.41°S 45.16°E	13.5 km
E	15.82°S 42.38°E	14.9 km
G	14.01°S 43.44°E	9.0 km
H	17.45°S 44.13°E	14.1 km
J	14.3°S 43.62°E	6.0 km
K	15.83°S 46.44°E	5.0 km
M	14.64°S 47.8°E	15.7 km
P	15.11°S 47.9°E	5.9 km
T	18.97°S 45.46°E	10.0 km
