= Vallis Rheita =

Lunar valley

Vallis Rheita (Rheita Valley) is one of the most prominent linear valley‑like features on the near side of the southeastern highlands of the Moon. It trends radially away from the center of the Mare Nectaris impact basin toward the southeast, similar in orientation and implied origin to Vallis Snellius to its northeast.

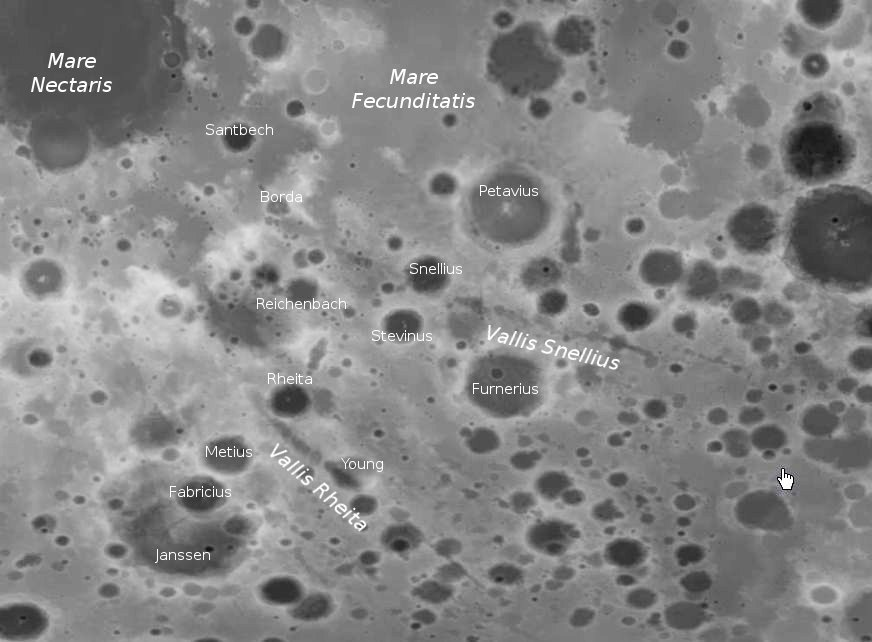
Vallis Rheita and Vallis Snellius (detail of LRO map)

In modern lunar mapping, Vallis Rheita is interpreted not as a tectonic trough but as a chain of partially overlapping impact structures formed in the aftermath of the formation of Mare Nectaris. Vallis Rheita appears as one of the largest ejecta related lineations observed in the Janssen Formation.

The center of the valley lies at selenographic coordinates 42.5°S 51.5°E.

It has a length of 445 km. At its maximum extent this valley has a width of about 30 km, but it narrows to 10 km at the southeastern extreme. It is the second longest such valley on the near side of the Moon, being exceeded only by Vallis Snellius.

Vallis Rheita has been eroded by a series of impacts, and several notable craters lie along the length of this valley. Near the northwestern end is the crater Rheita, for which this formation was named. Further to the southeast is the crater Young, nearly centered across the valley. Next to Young is Young D, also lying across the valley but less distorted by the rift.

Further southeast are the craters Mallet and Reimarus, the later located near the difficult-to-discern terminus. The satellite crater Mallet D, next to Mallet, also overlays part of the valley.
