= Gaudibert (crater) =

Crater on the Moon

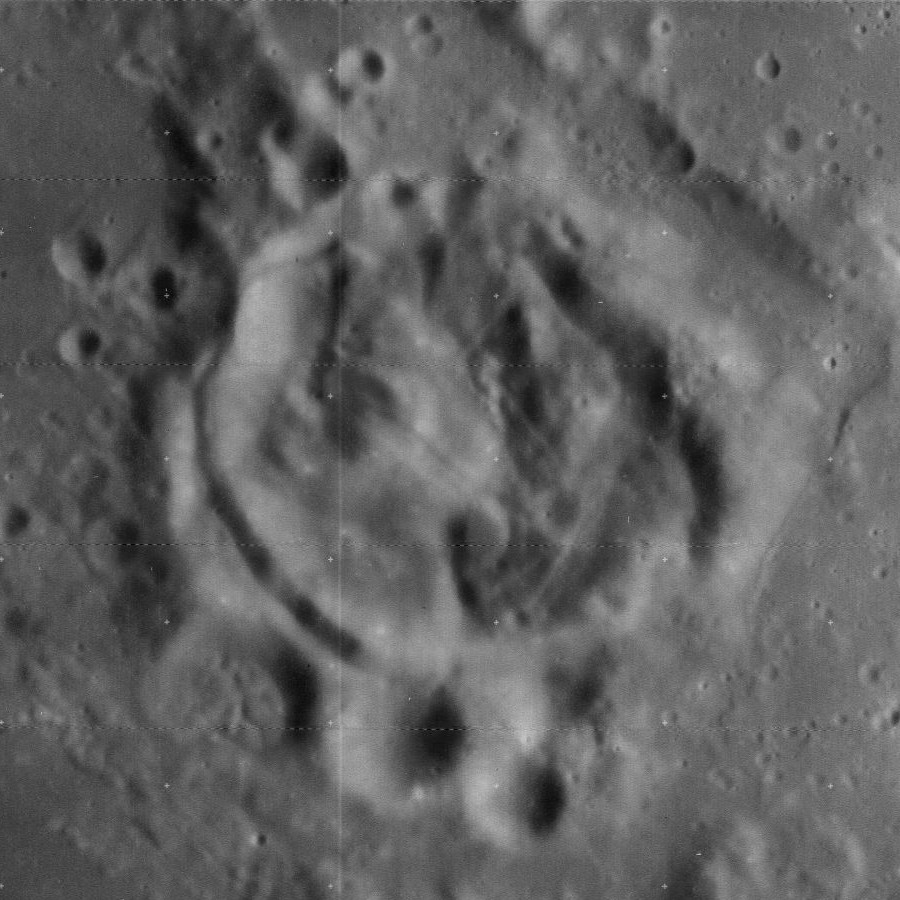
- Lunar Orbiter 4 image
- Coordinates: 10.93°S 37.82°E
- Diameter: 33.14 km (20.59 mi)
- Depth: 1.6 km (0.99 mi)
- Colongitude: 323° at sunrise
- Eponym: Casimir M. Gaudibert

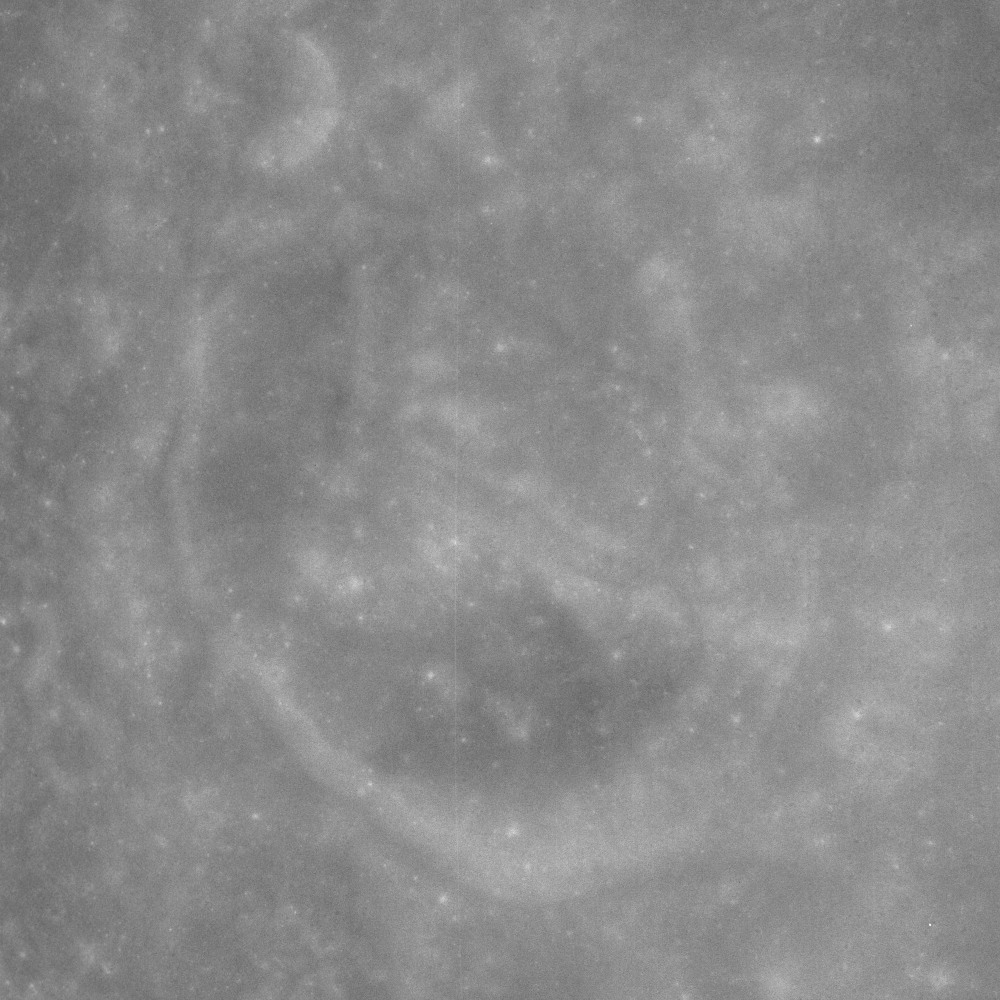
Apollo 12 image

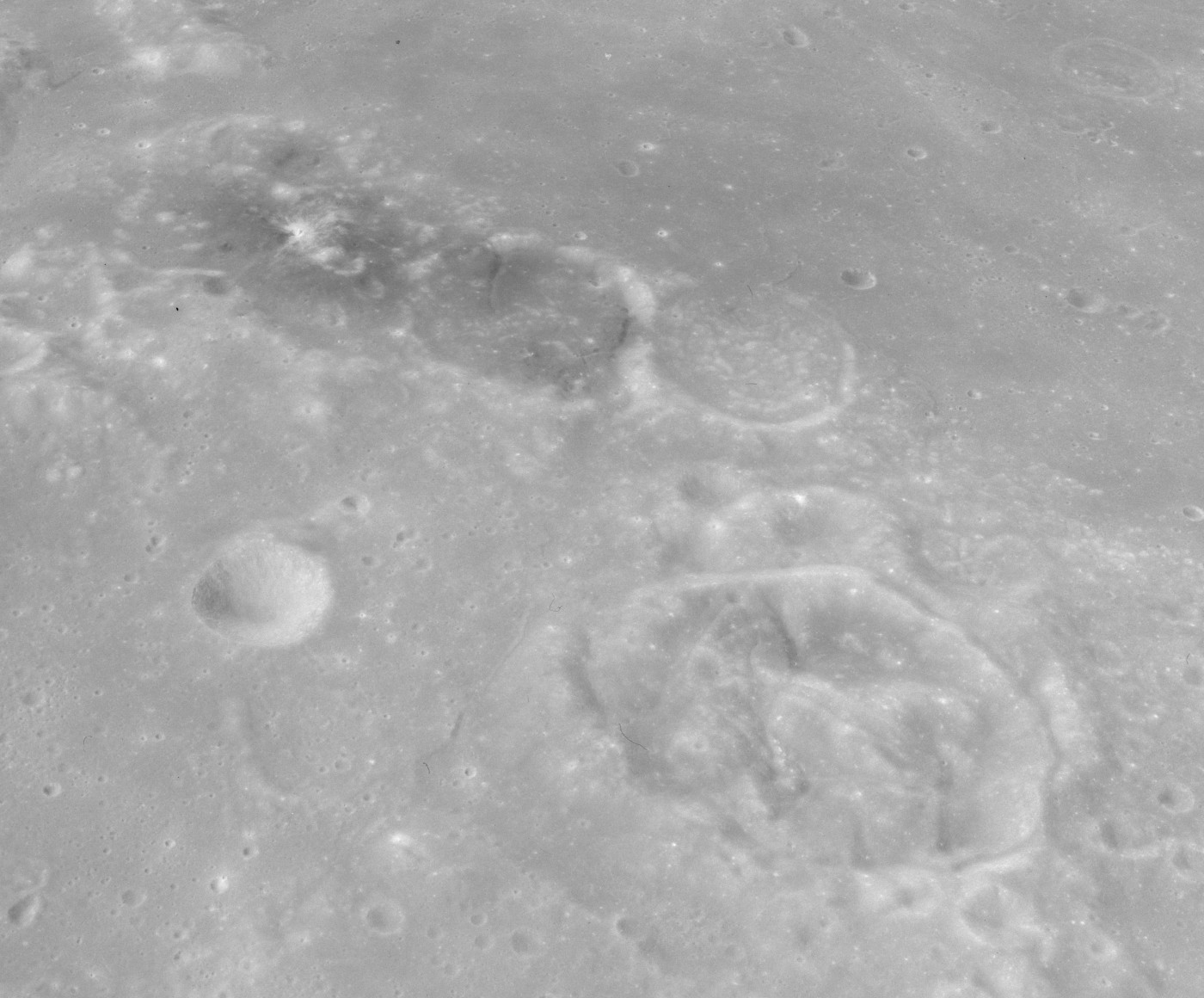
Apollo 16 image, facing south: Gaudibert in lower right, satellite craters A and B ("ghost craters") above center, and J at left.

Gaudibert is a lunar impact crater that lies along the northeast edge of Mare Nectaris in the eastern part of the Moon's near side. Just to the east is the Montes Pyrenaeus mountain chain, and to the northeast beyond the mountains is the crater Gutenberg. Northwest of Gaudibert is the crater pair Isidorus and Capella.

On the lunar geologic timescale, Gaudibert dates from the Nectarian period. This crater has a low rim and an irregular interior that makes it a relatively inconspicuous formation. The rim is roughly circular but somewhat uneven in outline. On the inner floor are several ridges that divide up the interior into several minor peaks and valleys. This is a floor-fractured crater with a pronounced V-shaped moat between the inner wall and the floor. A pair of bowl-shaped craters are attached to the southern edge of the crater rim.

To the south of Gaudibert is a formation of several ghost craters, of which the most notable are Gaudibert A and Gaudibert B. These are best viewed when the sun is at a low angle, resulting in greater contrast and shadows.

The crater was named after French astronomer Casimir Marie Gaudibert by the IAU in 1935.

== Satellite craters ==
By convention these features are identified on lunar maps by placing the letter on the side of the crater midpoint that is closest to Gaudibert.

Gaudibert	Latitude	Longitude	Diameter
A	12.2° S	37.9° E	21 km
B	12.3° S	38.5° E	21 km
C	11.5° S	37.8° E	9 km
D	10.5° S	36.3° E	5 km
H	13.8° S	36.7° E	11 km
J	11.1° S	39.1° E	10 km
