= Daguerre (crater) =

Crater on the Moon

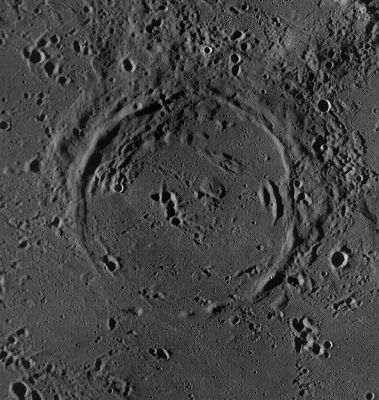
- LRO image
- Coordinates: 11.9°S 33.6°E
- Diameter: 45.79 km (28.45 mi)
- Colongitude: 327° at sunrise
- Eponym: Louis Daguerre

Daguerre is a circular formation near the north end of Mare Nectaris. To the west-northwest is the crater Mädler, and beyond it to the west is the prominent Theophilus. To the north in the rugged continental area between the maria is Isidorus.

This feature is a so-called ghost crater. It has the appearance of a lunar impact crater that has been nearly submerged by a lava flow, leaving a gap in the southwest wall that gives the feature the shape of a horse-shoe. The floor is overlaid by the linear ray from Mädler. Near the mid point is a tight cluster of small craters. A 2-km diameter crater, on the interior near the western rim, has produced a bright halo across the dark mare surface. The maximum altitude of the surviving rim is 1.5 km.

The crater was named after French artist and photographer Louis Daguerre (1789-1851). His name was incorporated into the lunar nomenclature of German astronomer Johann F. J. Schmidt in 1878. Its designation was formally adopted by the International Astronomical Union in 1935.

== Satellite craters ==
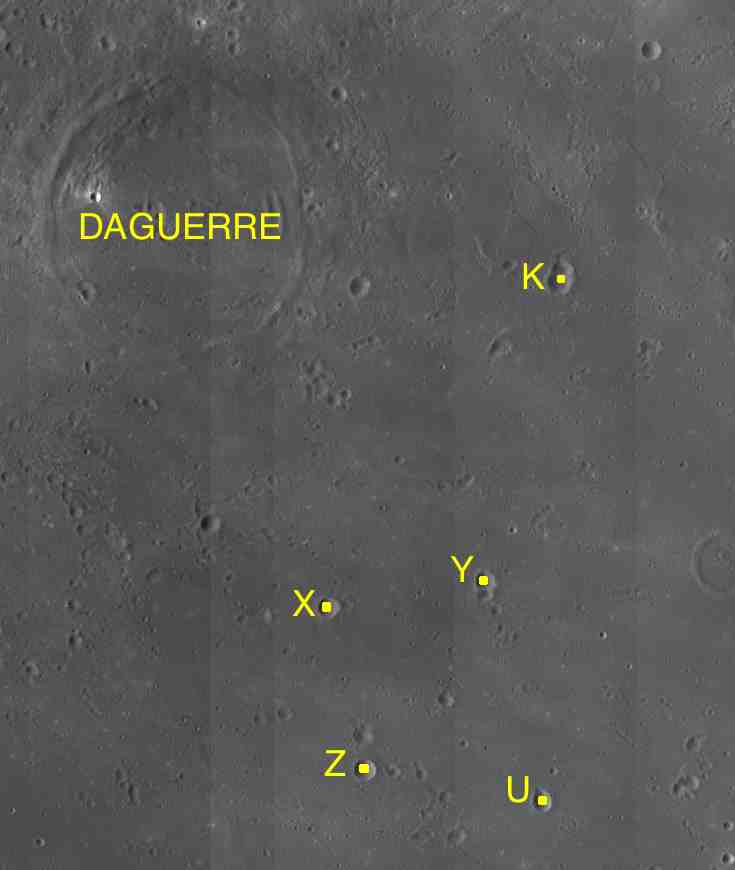
Satellite features of Daguerre

By convention these features are identified on lunar maps by placing the letter on the side of the crater midpoint that is closest to Daguerre.

Daguerre	Latitude	Longitude	Diameter
K	12.2° S	35.8° E	5 km
U	15.1° S	35.7° E	4 km
X	14.0° S	34.5° E	4 km
Y	13.9° S	35.4° E	3 km
Z	14.9° S	34.7° E	4 km

== Gallery ==
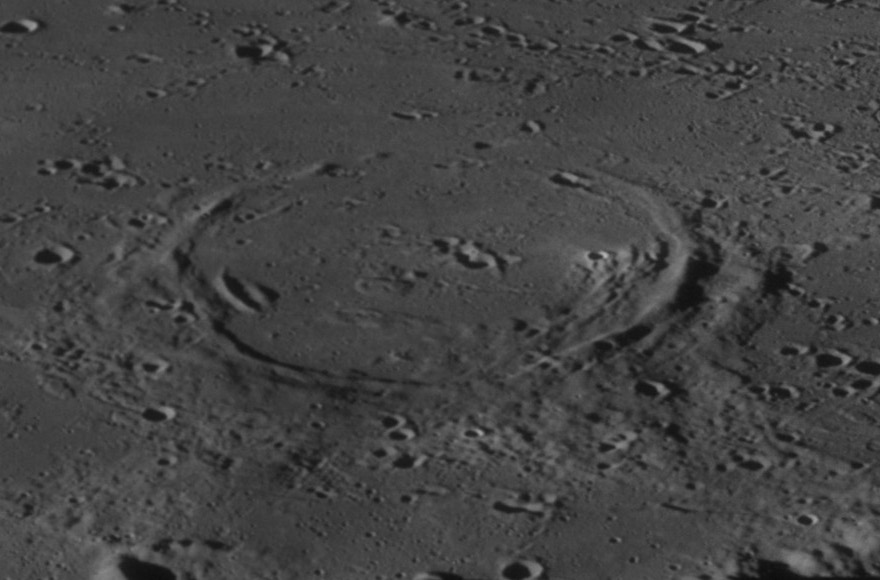
Oblique view facing south from Apollo 11

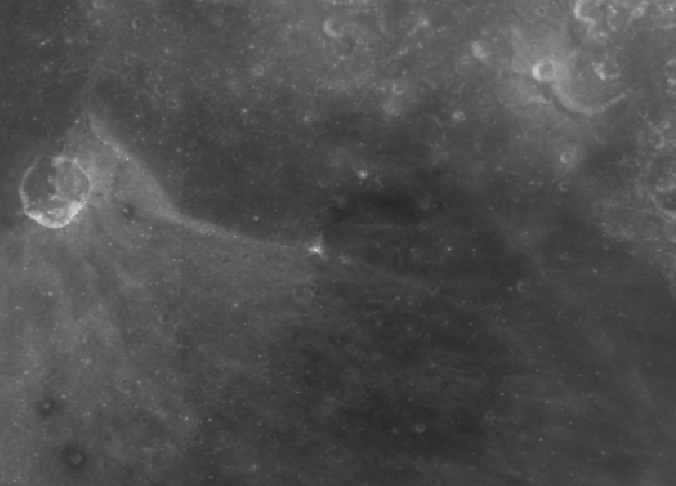
Region around Daguerre

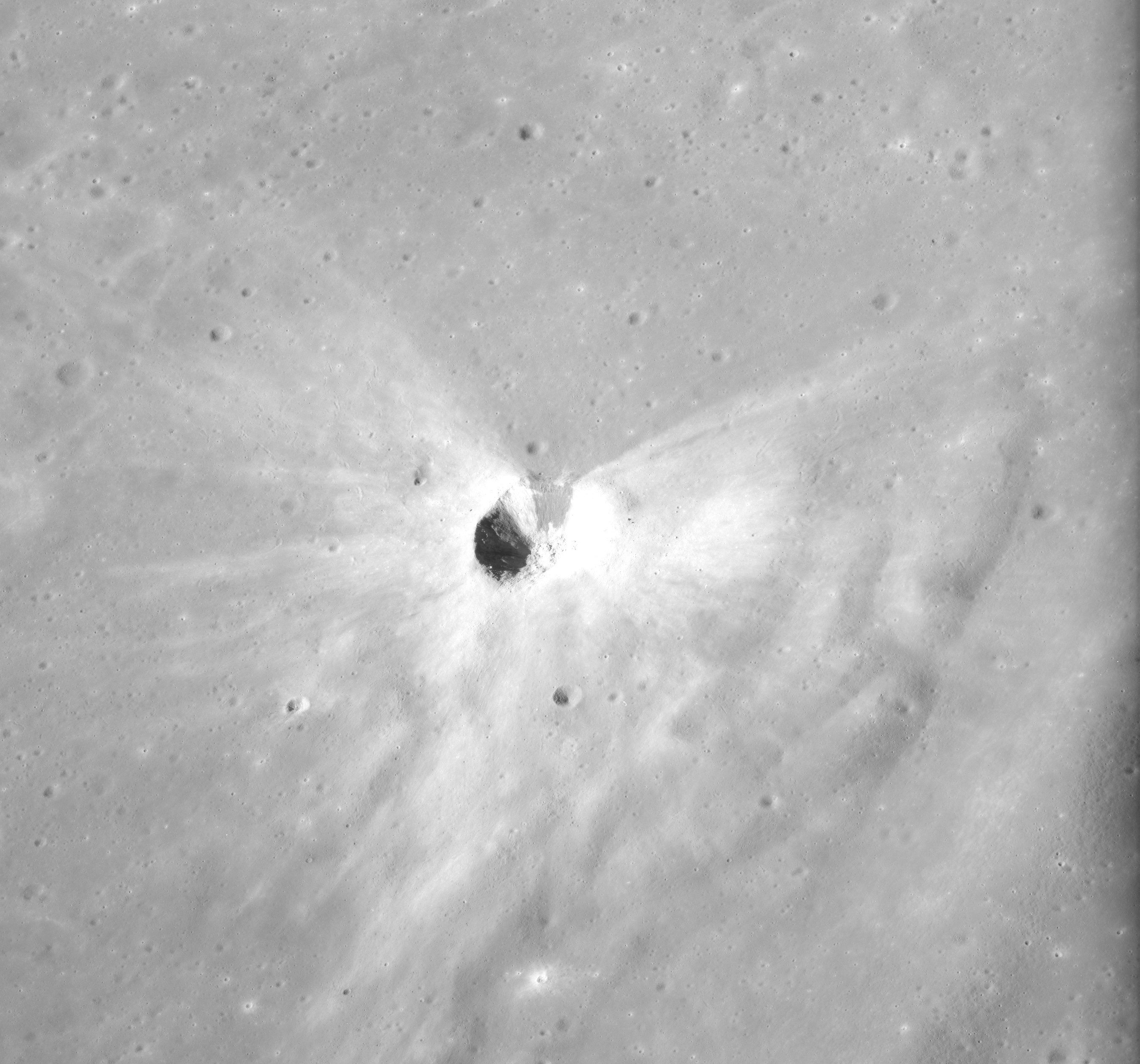
Ray system of a crater in Daguerre.
