= Leakey (crater) =

Crater on the Moon

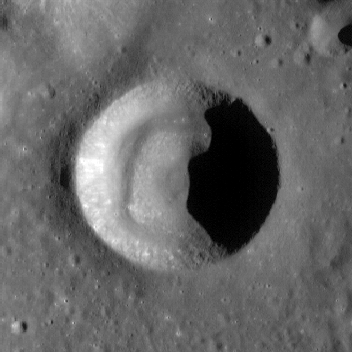
- LRO image
- Coordinates: 3.2°S 37.4°E
- Diameter: 12 km
- Depth: 1.43 km
- Colongitude: 324° at sunrise
- Eponym: Louis Leakey

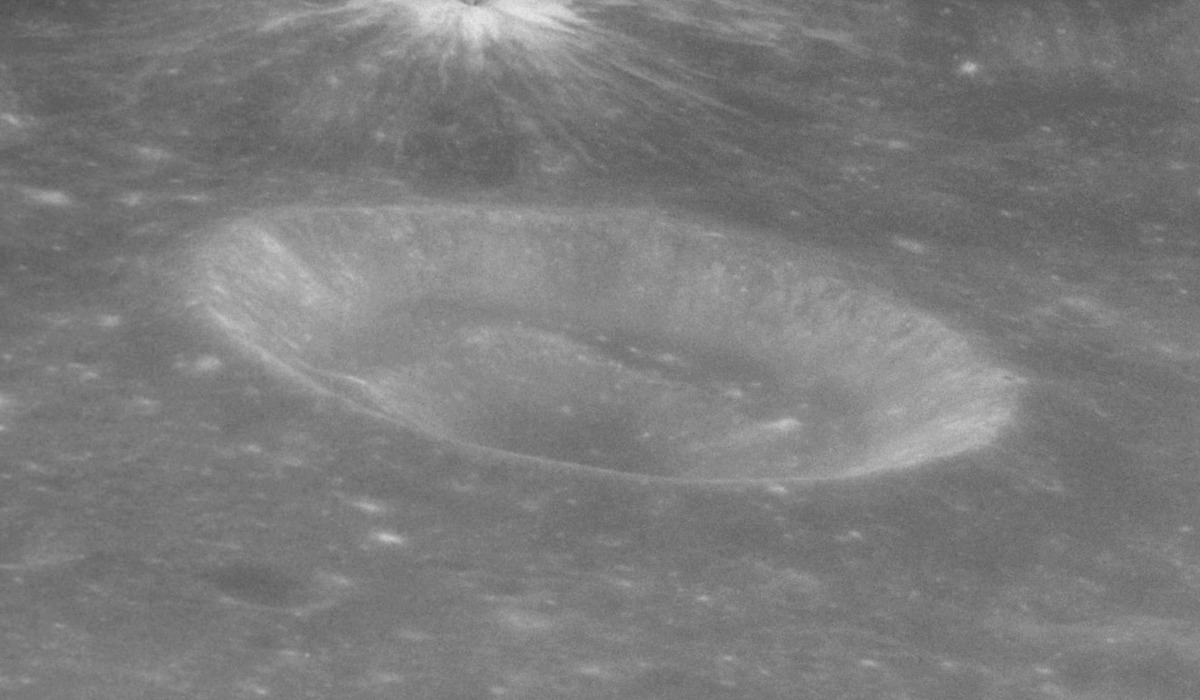
Oblique Apollo 12 image

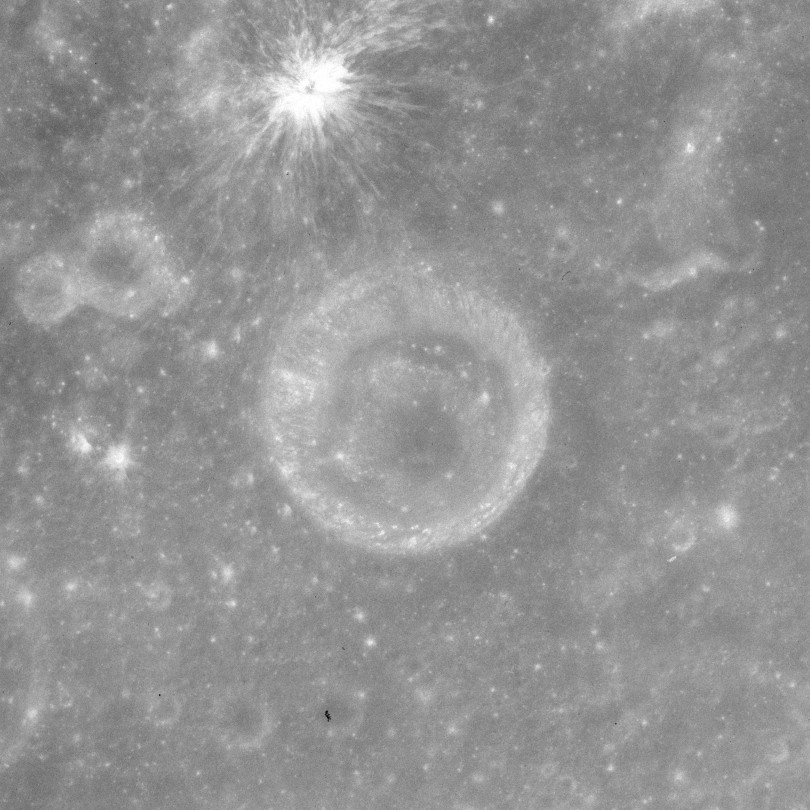
Apollo 16 image at high sun angle

Leakey is a small, undistinguished lunar impact crater that is located in an area of rough terrain in the eastern part of the Moon. It was named after British archaeologist Louis Leakey. Previously, it was designated Censorinus F.

The immediate area is not notable for crater features, although some distance to the southwest is the crater pair of Capella and Isidorus. In the surface between this pair and Leakey is a system of rilles designated the Rimae Gutenberg that follow a course to the southeast.

Leakey is a circular, bowl-shaped formation that is symmetrical and not significantly eroded. The inner walls slope down to a ring of low albedo material having a diameter about half that of the crater. The rim is not notably eroded and the crater has no other features of interest.
