= Goclenius =

Goclenius is a surname. Notable people with the surname include:

- Conrad Goclenius (1490-1539), German humanist
- Rudolph Goclenius (1547–1628), German scholastic philosopher
- Rudolph Goclenius the Younger (1572–1621), German physician and professor of physics, medicine and mathematics; son of the above
  - Goclenius, a lunar crater named after the younger Goclenius
