= Magelhaens =

Magelhaens is the name used by the International Astronomical Union for features commemorating the explorer Ferdinand Magellan.

It can refer to:

- Magelhaens (lunar crater), a feature on the Moon
- Magelhaens A, an associated feature on the Moon
- Magelhaens (Martian crater), a feature on Mars
