= Torricelli =

Torricelli may refer to:

== People with the surname ==
- Evangelista Torricelli (1608–1647), Italian physicist and mathematician
- Robert Torricelli (born 1951), United States politician
- Moreno Torricelli (born 1970), Italian football player
- Giuseppe Antonio Torricelli (1662–1719), Italian sculptor

== Science ==
- Torricelli's law, a theorem in fluid dynamics
- Torricelli's equation, an equation created by Evangelista Torricelli
- Torricelli's trumpet or Gabriel's Horn, a geometric figure
- Torricelli point or Fermat point, a point such that the total distance from the three vertices of the triangle to the point is the minimum possible
- Torricelli's experiment, an experiment named after Torricelli

== Italian submarines ==
- Evangelista Torricelli, an Archimede-class submarine
- Torricelli, a Brin-class submarine
- Italian submarine Evangelista Torricelli (S 512), the former USS Lizardfish

== Other ==
- Torricelli (crater), a lunar crater in the Sinus Asperitatis
- Torricelli Act, another part of the United States' long running embargo against Cuba
- Torricelli languages, a language family of Papua New Guinea
- Torricelli Mountains, a mountain range in Papua New Guinea

== See also ==
- Torr or mm Hg, a unit of pressure named after Evangelista Torricelli
