= Gaudibert =

Gaudibert is a surname. Notable people with the surname include:

- Casimir Marie Gaudibert (1823–1901), French astronomer and selenographer
- Éric Gaudibert (1936–2012), Swiss composer
- Pierre Gaudibert (1928–2006), French art curator and critic
