= Sinus Asperitatis =

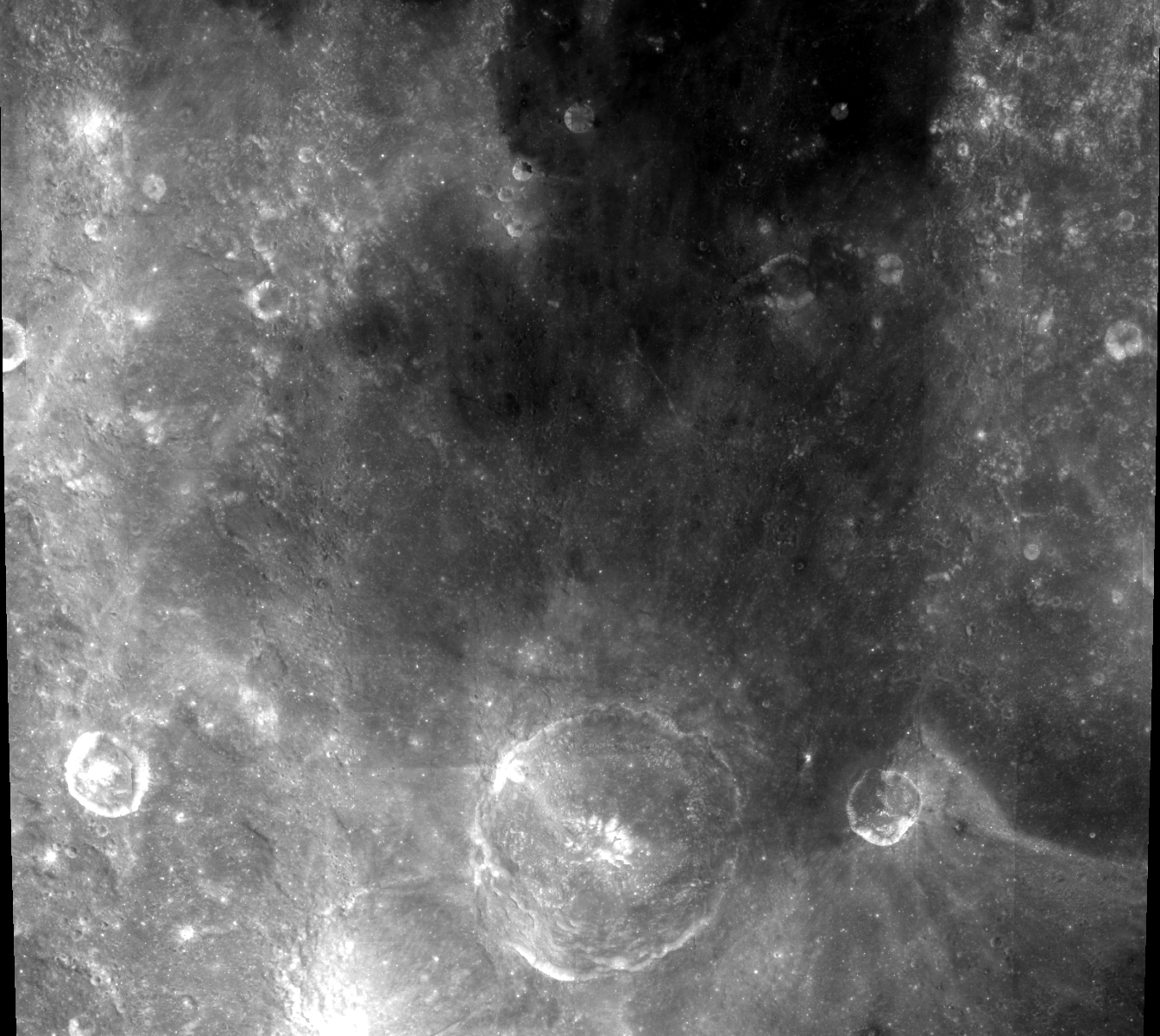
- Coordinates: 3.8°S 27.4°E
- Diameter: 206 km
- Eponym: Bay of Roughness

Sinus Asperitatis /ˈsaɪnəs ˌæspərɪˈteɪtɪs/ (Latin sinus asperitātis "Bay of Roughness") is an area of lunar mare that extends southward from the Mare Tranquillitatis until it joins the Mare Nectaris to the southeast. It is bordered along the western and eastern sides by continental regions of irregular terrain. The selenographic coordinates of this feature are 3.8° S, 27.4° E, and it has a diameter of 206 km.

In the northern part of this mare is the small crater Torricelli. At the southern end is the prominent crater pair of Theophilus and Cyrillus. On the border between Sinus Asperitatis and the Mare Nectaris is the crater Mädler.
