= Capella (crater) =

Lunar impact crater

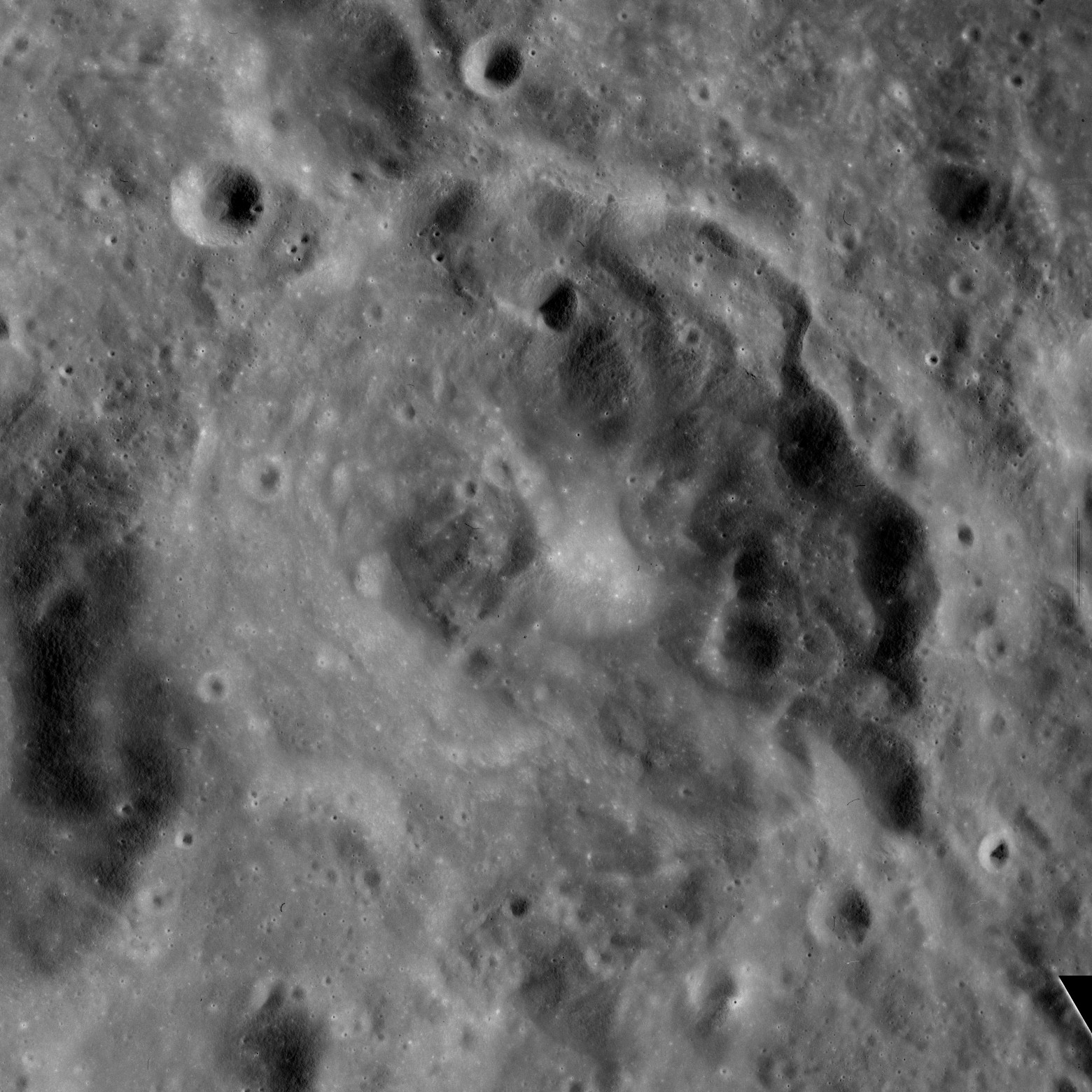
- Apollo 16 image
- Coordinates: 7.6°S 34.9°E
- Diameter: 48.13 km (29.91 mi)
- Depth: 3.5 km (2.2 mi)
- Colongitude: 325° at sunrise
- Eponym: Martianus Capella

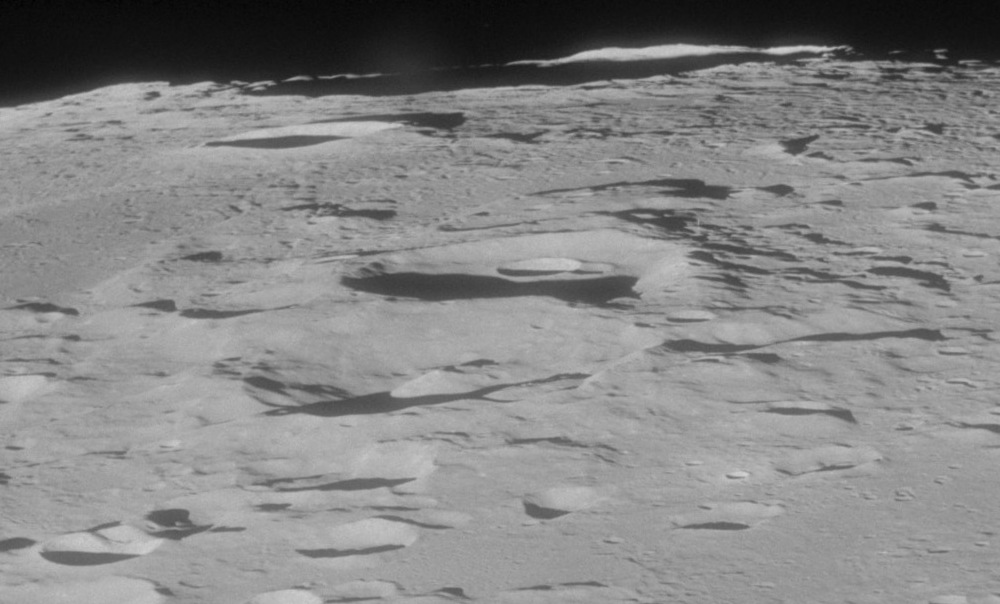
Oblique view facing west of Capella (below center) and Isidorus (above center). The large crater on the horizon is Theophilus. This shot was taken from the Apollo 11 Lunar Module Eagle.

Capella is a lunar impact crater 48 km (30 mi) in diameter that lies to the north of the Mare Nectaris, in a rugged region with many small impact craters. It intrudes slightly into the eastern rim of the crater Isidorus, a feature only slightly smaller in diameter.

The outer circumferential wall of Capella is low but relatively thick and irregular, with a large promontory intruding on the south-eastern side. The crater is crossed by a deep rift, the Vallis Capella, which passes directly through Capella from the north rim through the southeast side of the wall, and extends out both sides for a combined distance of 110 kilometers. This feature was formed by a chain of craters. In the middle of the crater is a wide, round peak rising 1.2 km above the crater floor, with a craterlet at the top. The western side of the crater is dotted with impact debris, forming clusters of small hills.

This crater was named after Roman astronomer Martianus Capella (c. A.D. 400-unkn). Its designation was officially adopted by the International Astronomical Union in 1935.

== Satellite craters ==
By convention these features are identified on lunar maps by placing the letter on the side of the crater midpoint that is closest to Capella.

Capella	Latitude	Longitude	Diameter
A	7.6° S	37.2° E	13 km
B	9.4° S	36.8° E	10 km
C	5.7° S	36.3° E	11 km
D	6.7° S	37.6° E	8 km
E	7.5° S	37.7° E	16 km
F	9.2° S	35.4° E	14 km
G	6.8° S	36.9° E	12 km
H	8.1° S	37.4° E	9 km
J	9.4° S	36.0° E	9 km
M	4.4° S	37.0° E	12 km
R	6.0° S	35.2° E	7 km
T	6.9° S	34.2° E	6 km
