= Gutenberg (crater) =

Crater on the Moon

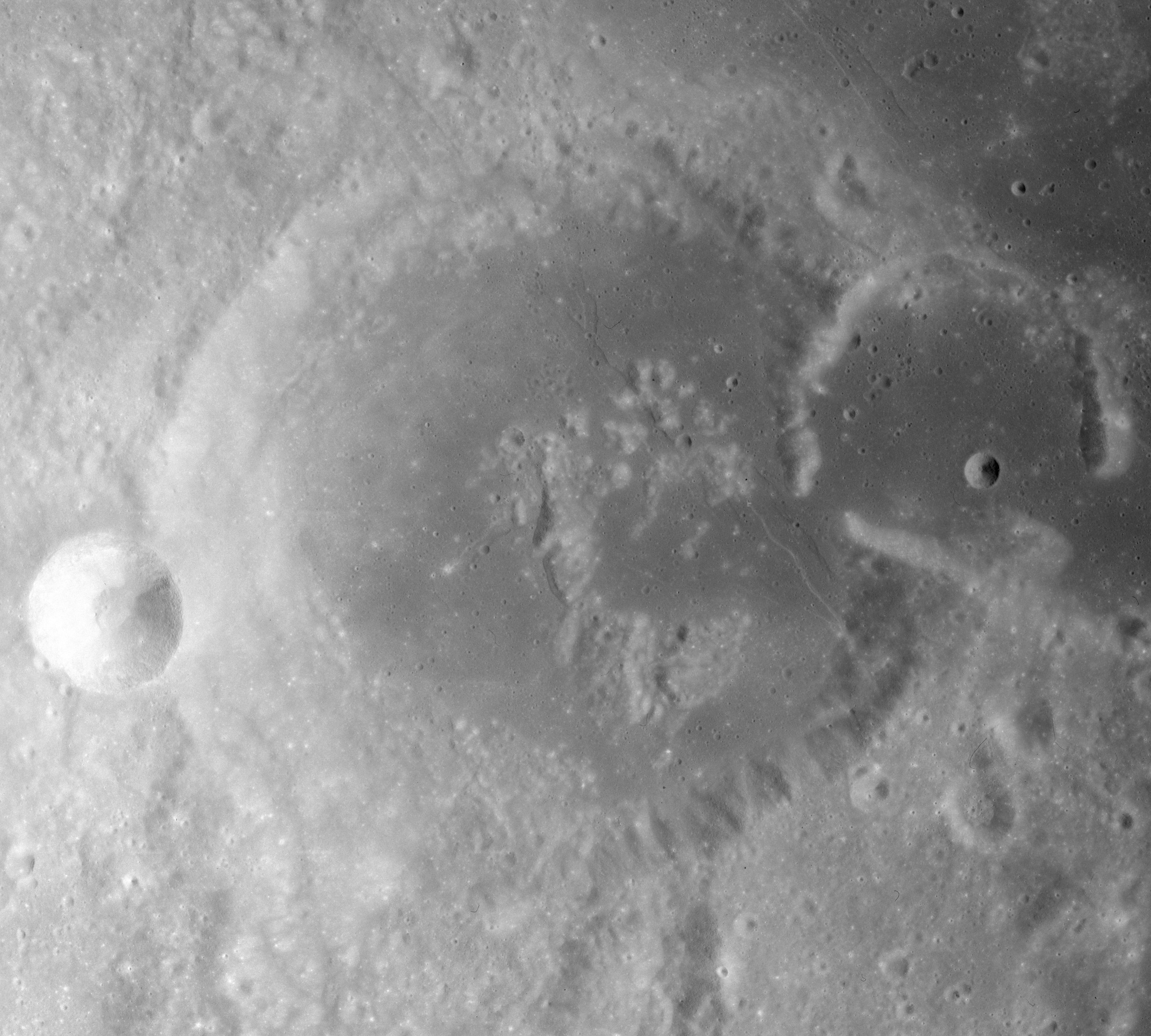
- Apollo 16 image
- Coordinates: 8.6°S 41.2°E
- Diameter: 74 km
- Depth: 1.75 km
- Colongitude: 318° at sunrise
- Eponym: Johannes Gutenberg

Gutenberg is a lunar impact crater that lies along the west edge of Mare Fecunditatis, in the eastern part of the visible Moon. It is named after German inventor Johannes Gutenberg. To the southeast are the craters Goclenius, Magelhaens and Colombo. To the west-southwest is the crater Gaudibert, across the Montes Pyrenaeus that run south from Gutenberg.

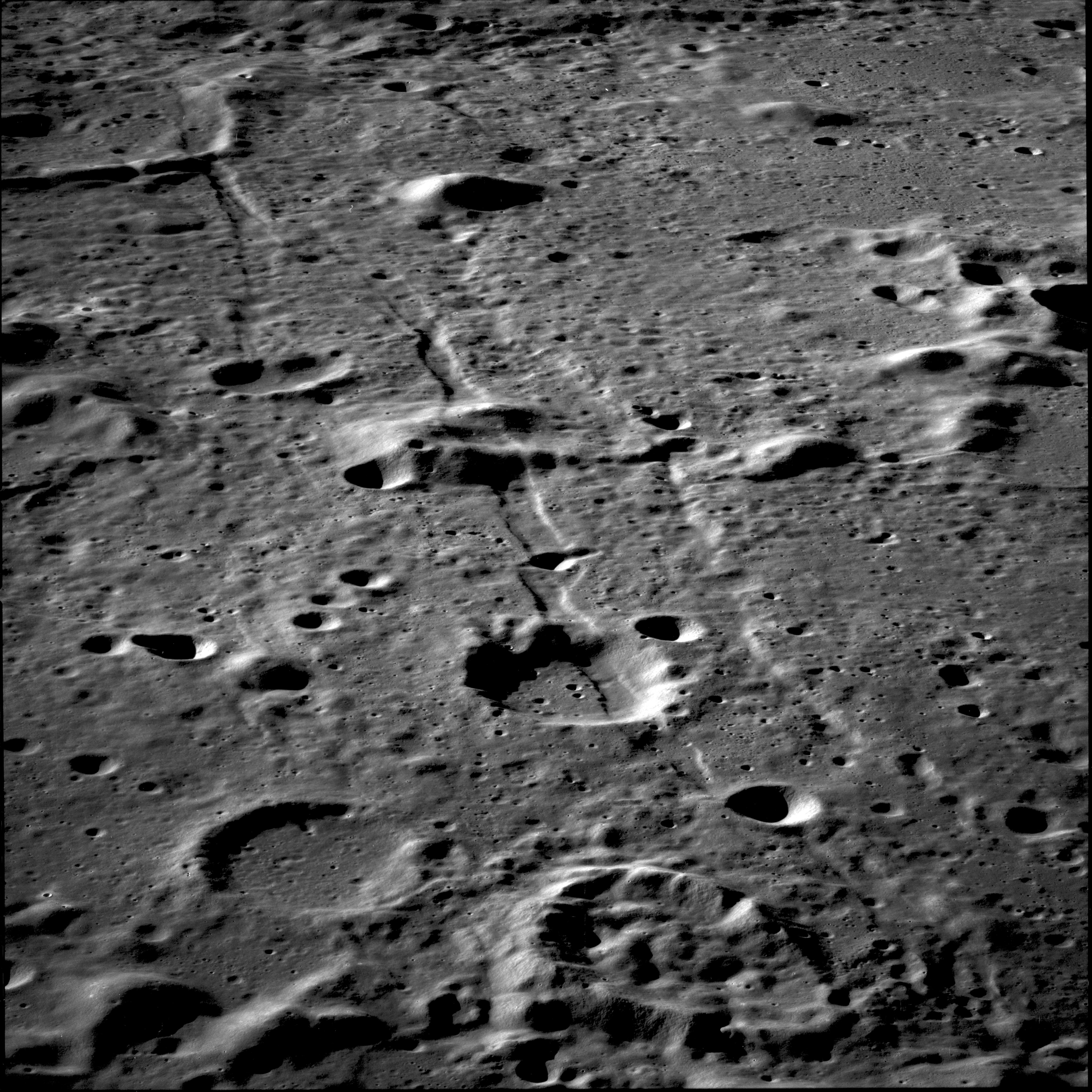
Apollo 11 image of Rimae Gutenberg, facing southeast.

The rim of Gutenberg is worn and eroded, most notably in the east where it is broken by the overlapping crater Gutenberg E. This crater in turn has gaps in its southeast and southwest rims, forming a passage to the lunar mare to the east. There are also clefts and valleys in the southern rim where it joins Gutenberg C. The crater Gutenberg A intrudes into the southwest rim.

The floors of Gutenberg and Gutenberg E have been flooded in the past by lava, forming a relatively flat plain across the bottom. This surface is broken across the northeast by a pair of clefts that form a part of the Rimae Goclenius. These extend northwest from the Goclenius region. The central rise of Gutenberg is a semi-circular range of hills that are the most prominent in the south, and the concave part lies open to the east. The floor is otherwise not marred by any significant craters.

== Satellite craters ==
By convention these features are identified on lunar maps by placing the letter on the side of the crater midpoint that is closest to Gutenberg.

Gutenberg	Latitude	Longitude	Diameter
A	9.0° S	39.9° E	15 km
B	9.1° S	38.3° E	15 km
C	10.0° S	41.1° E	45 km
D	10.9° S	42.8° E	20 km
E	8.2° S	42.4° E	28 km
F	10.2° S	42.6° E	8 km
G	6.0° S	40.0° E	32 km
H	6.7° S	39.0° E	5 km
K	7.2° S	40.8° E	6 km
