= Isidorus (crater) =

Crater on the Moon

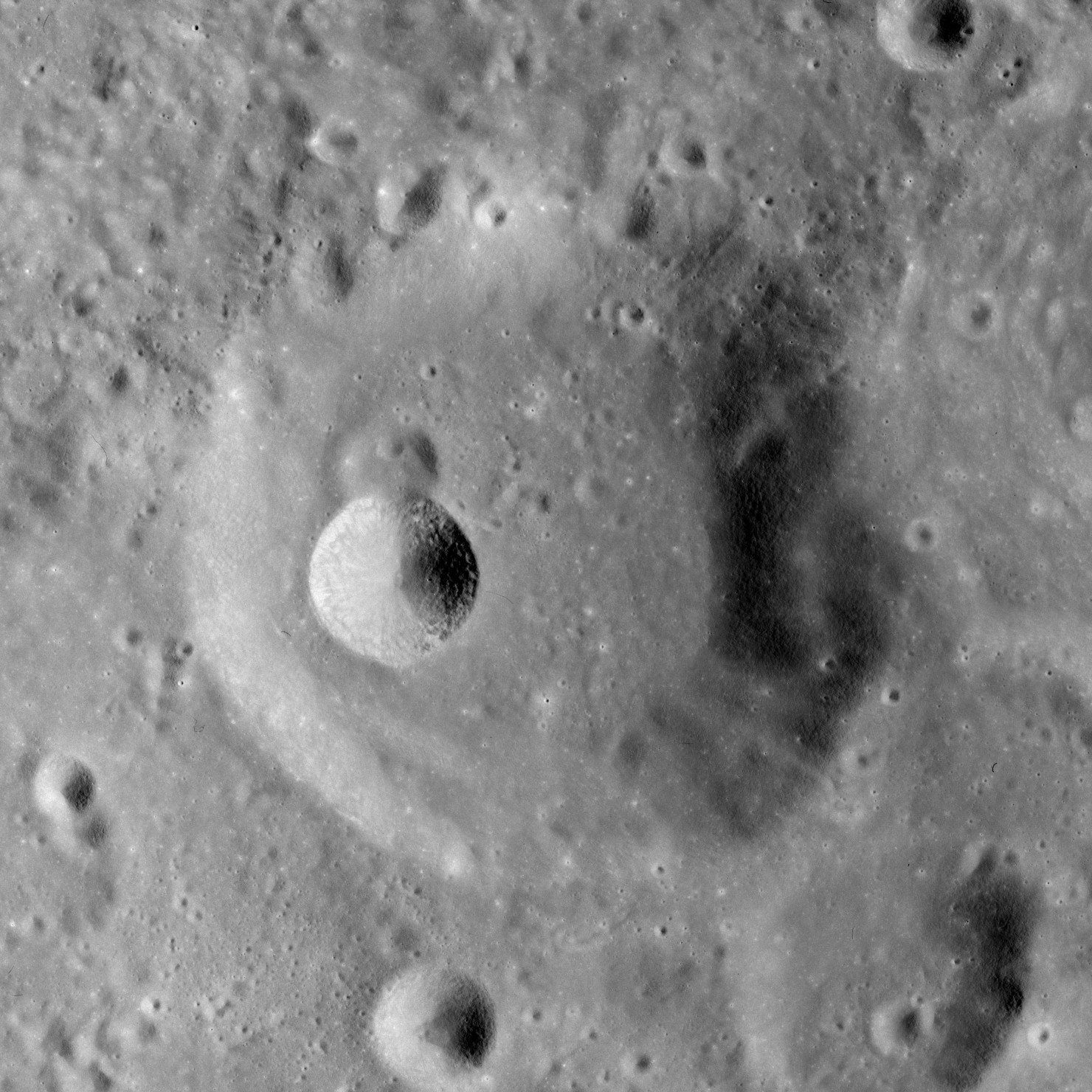
- Apollo 16 image
- Coordinates: 8.0°S 33.5°E
- Diameter: 42 km
- Depth: 2.5 km
- Colongitude: 327° at sunrise
- Eponym: St. Isidore

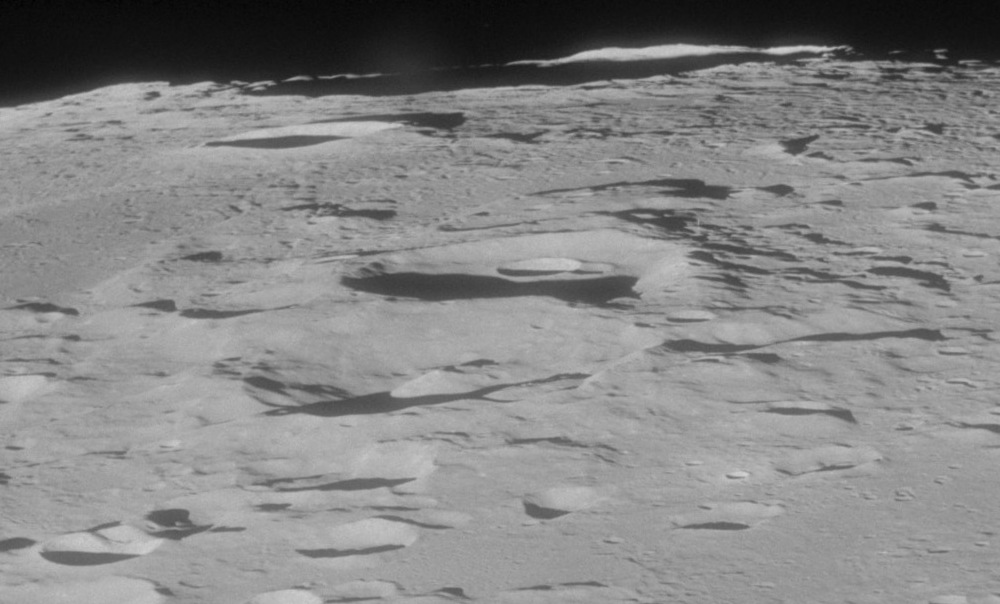
Oblique view facing west of Capella (below center) and Isidorus (above center). The large crater on the horizon is Theophilus. This shot was taken from the Apollo 11 Lunar Module Eagle.

Isidorus is a lunar impact crater that is located to the north of the Mare Nectaris, on the eastern half of the Moon's near side. It was named after Spanish astronomer Saint Isidore of Seville. It forms a pair with the slightly larger Capella, which is attached to the east-northeastern rim. To the west-southwest across the lunar mare are Mädler and the prominent Theophilus.

The rim of Isidorus is circular and somewhat eroded, with several tiny craterlets lying across the northern rim. The interior floor has been resurfaced by lava and is generally level, although it is marked by the small, bowl-shaped crater Isidorus A along the western rim. There is a tiny remnant of a craterlet attached to the northern rim of the latter formation.

== Satellite craters ==
By convention these features are identified on lunar maps by placing the letter on the side of the crater midpoint that is closest to Isidorus.

| Isidorus | Latitude | Longitude | Diameter |
|---|---|---|---|
| A | 8.0° S | 33.2° E | 10 km |
| B | 4.5° S | 33.0° E | 30 km |
| C | 4.8° S | 31.7° E | 9 km |
| D | 4.2° S | 34.1° E | 15 km |
| E | 5.3° S | 32.6° E | 15 km |
| F | 8.7° S | 34.2° E | 20 km |
| G | 6.4° S | 31.6° E | 7 km |
| H | 3.9° S | 32.6° E | 7 km |
| K | 8.9° S | 33.3° E | 7 km |
| U | 7.9° S | 31.5° E | 6 km |
| V | 8.9° S | 30.8° E | 4 km |
| W | 9.4° S | 32.3° E | 4 km |
