= Jean Roberti =

Luxembourgish Jesuit (1569–1651)

Jean Roberti (also Johannes) (1569 – 14 February 1651) was a Luxembourgish Jesuit who became known for his part in a medical and scientific controversy. He was also a theological writer.

== Life ==
He was born in Saint-Hubert and studied in Jesuit colleges at Liège and Cologne. He entered the Society of Jesus in 1592, held teaching posts, and was awarded a D.D. at Mainz. He became rector of the college at Paderborn, and died at Namur. Remacle Roberti (Remaclus Robertius), an official and adviser in the Spanish Netherlands, was his brother.

== Works ==
In 1609 Roberti wrote a reply, his Brevis anatome, to a 1608 work of Rudolph Goclenius on medical astrology from a Paracelsian perspective, that had mentioned a weapon salve (a type of sympathetic magic). Roberti objected to the efficacy of the weapon salve being attributed to purely natural causes. He called the explanation of Goclenius necromantic, and a confusion of natural magic with other kinds. Goclenius replied by listing 45 kinds of "evil magic", and 24 effects that had been achieved by a magus, and could not be explained by natural causes. A pamphlet war continued; in 1621 Goclenius died, but Johannes Baptista van Helmont then published the same year his De magnetica vulnerum curatione, a severe attack on Roberti as well as critical of Goclenius who (in his opinion) had a simplistic view. The attacks of Roberti had some effects: van Helmont went through an examination by the Inquisition, and some sideblows against the Rosicrucians he made in 1618 were picked up in 1623 by Marin Mersenne and Jean Boucher.

Mysticae Ezechielis quadrigae was a work on the four Gospels. Roberti edited the Flores epytaphii sanctorum of Theofried of Epternach, Legend of St. Hubert, and other works of hagiography.
