= Casimir Marie Gaudibert =

French astronomer and selenographer

Casimir Marie Gaudibert (4 March 1823 – 9 June 1901) was a French amateur astronomer and selenographer.

Gaudibert produced a map of the Moon in 1887. Under the direction of Camille Flammarion, Emile Bertaux subsequently produced a globe of the moon based on Gaudibert's lunar map.

The crater Gaudibert on the Moon is named after him.

== Religion ==
Gaudibert was born into a Roman Catholic family in central France. He was converted to Protestantism through a conversation with an itinerant Spanish evangelist. He moved to Belgium where he was a preacher involved with L'Église missionnaire but was evicted from his pulpit because some of his teaching was considered as unacceptable. From then on he was a teacher in the Plymouth Brethren assemblies in Belgium.
