= Rudolph Goclenius the Younger =

German physician

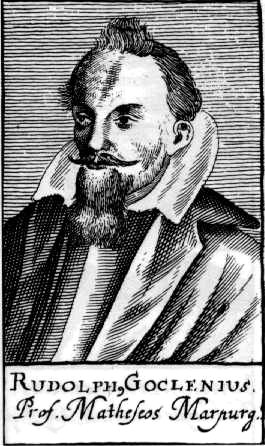
Rudolf Goclenius, Jr.

Rudolph Goclenius the Younger (born Rudolph Göckel; 22 August 1572 – 3 March 1621) was a German physician and professor at Philipps University of Marburg.

Goclenius was born in Wittenberg, the oldest son of Rudolph Goclenius, who was also professor of physics, logic, mathematics and ethics at Marburg. He enrolled at the University of Marburg at the age of 15. As a student, Goclenius was a respondent to his father in a physical disputation and received his master's degree in 1591. After obtaining his medical degree in 1601, Goclenius became the first rector of the newly founded gymnasium in Büdingen and a personal physician (archiatrus) to Wolfgang Ernst I, Count of Isenburg-Büdingen. In 1608, he was appointed to the professorship of physics, astronomy and arithmetic at Marburg University. Afterwards, he took over the chairs of medicine (1611) and mathematics (1612) at the same place.

The younger Goclenius died in Marburg. His father wrote a poem for his funeral on 4 March 1621

As a physician he worked on cures against the plague. He became famous for his miraculous cure with the "weapon salve" or Powder of Sympathy. Based on the hermetic concepts of Paracelsus he published 1608 the proposition of a "magnetic" cure to heal wounds: the application of the salve on the weapon should heal the wounds afflicted by the weapon. This concept was brought to England by the alchemist Robert Fludd. A famous proponent was Sir Kenelm Digby. Synchronising the effects of the powder (which apparently caused a noticeable effect on the patient when applied) was actually suggested in the leaflet Curious Enquiries in 1687 as a means of solving the longitude problem.

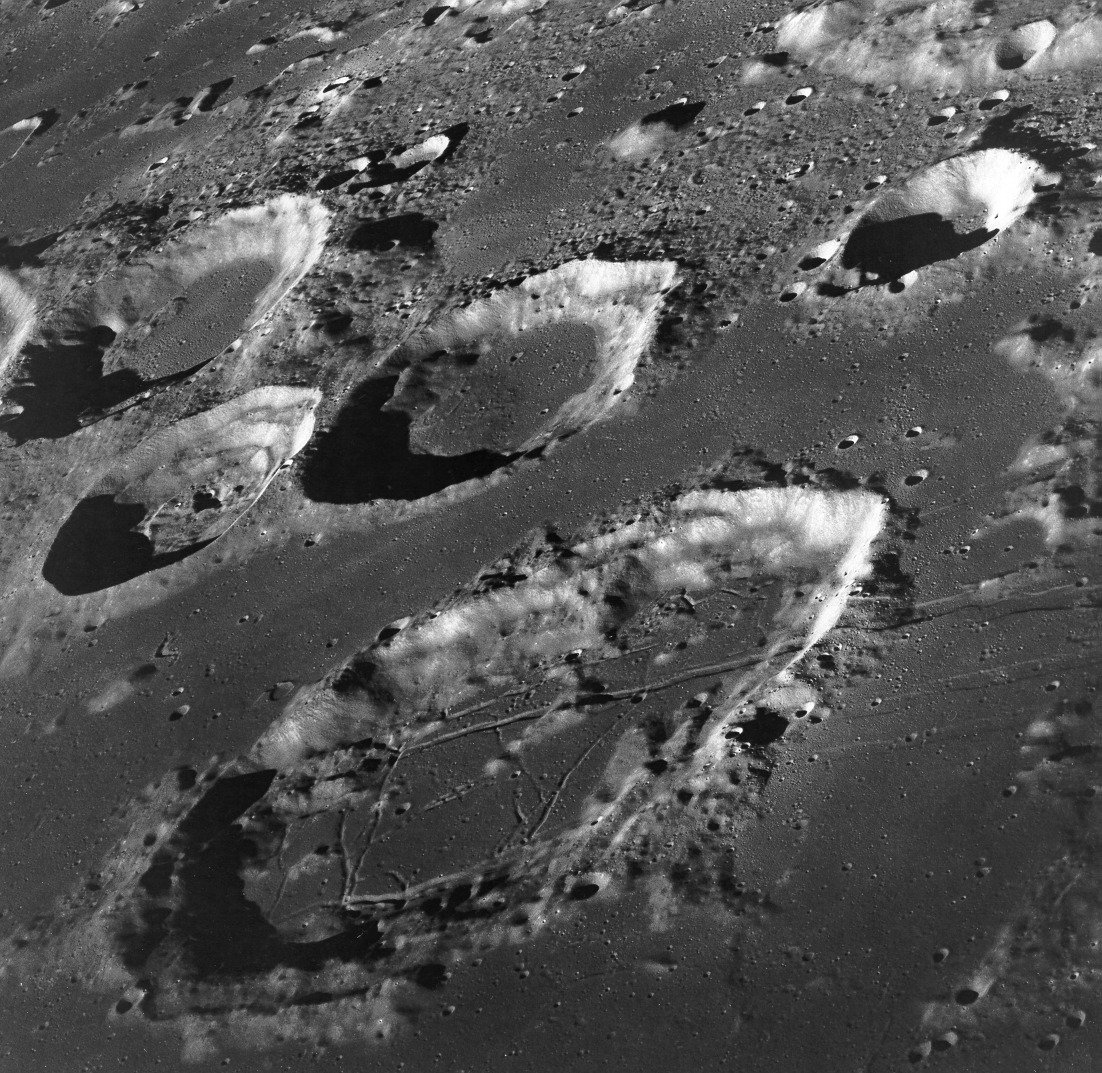
The lunar crater Goclenius (at bottom) and its surroundings. NASA photo.

He is the eponym of the lunar crater Goclenius. Already in 1651, the Jesuits Riccioli/Grimaldi honored him on behalf of his book Urania (1615) on astrology and astronomy.

== Publications ==
As a medical student:

- In Obitum Illustriss. Principis, &c., in: Kirchner, H. Parentatio, Perpetuae recordationis ergo habita, ... Domino Georgio, Landgravio Hassiae, Marburg 1596, p. 37 [a poem written on the occasion of the death of George I, Landgrave of Hesse-Darmstadt]
- Aphorismorum Chiromanticorum Tractatus Compendiosus, Lich 1597
- De Luctu Minuendo Ex currentis seculi perversitate: Oratio Brevis, Kopenhagen 1598
- Quaestiones Mixtas In Utramque Partem Controversas, cum adjuncta disputatione de Principiis Medicinae Paracelsicae, quod in arte medendi non habeant fundamentum, Marburg 1600 [His medical thesis. Goclenius argues that the principles of Paracelsian medicine are symbolic and lack a solid foundation in healing; defends the traditional humoral theory of Hippocrates & Galen; concludes that Paracelsian remedies are dangerous; endorses the traditional Hippocratic & Galenic medical practices.]

Büdingen years (1601-1608):

- Oratio de scholarum necessitate et doctrina, pro apertura & fundatione Scholae Budingensis, Hanau 1601
- Uranoscopia, Chiroscopia & Metaposcopia, Lich 1603
- Epistola Dedicatoria, in: Goclenius, R. [Sr.], Physicae Completae Speculum, Frankfurt 1604 [Dedicatory letter to Landgrave Moritz, signed Büdingen, February 8, 1604. Presenting his father's work on physics, Goclenius details his efforts to organize and enhance the manuscript, which was originally scattered and incomplete. He mentions adding a section on plant knowledge and correcting an omission related to celestial calculations.]
- De Luxu Convivali Nostri Seculi, ..., Oratio, Lich 1604, Marburg 1607 (rev. ed.)
- De Pestis, Febrisque Pestilentis Causis, Marburg 1607
- Weiß und Weg / Sich for [sic] der schweren Seuche der Pestilenz / ... / zubewahren, Marburg 1607
- Uranoscopiae, Chiroscopiae, Metoposcopiae, Et Ophtalmoscopiae, Contemplatio, Frankfurt 1608 [new edition; dedicatory letter signed: Büdingen, July 29, 1607]
- De Vita Proroganda, Mainz 1608 [dedicatory letter signed: Büdingen, January 7, 1608]

Marburg years (1608-1621):

- Oratio Qua defenditur Vulnus Non Applicato Etiam Remedio, Marburg 1608 [inauguration as physics professor at Marburg University on April 24, 1608]
- Tractatus De Magnetica Curatione Vulneris, Marburg 1609 [rev. ed. of Oratio Qua defenditur Vulnus Non Applicato Etiam Remedio, Marburg 1608]
- Tractatus De Portentosis Luxuriosis ac Monstrosis nostri seculi convivijs, Marburg 1609 [rev. ed. of De Luxu Convivali Nostri Seculi, ..., Oratio, Marburg 1607]
- Tractatus De Magnetica Curatione Vulneris, Marburg 1610 [the latter two treatises in one book]. Further editions as:
  - Tractatus Novus De Magnetica Vulnerum Curatione, Frankfurt 1613 [dedicatory letter signed: October 15, 1612]
  - De Magnetica Vulnerum Curatione, ..., Tractatus, s.l. 1613 [preface signed: October 28, 1612. The first part of this edition, without the Tractatus Alter, was reprinted as Tractatus De Manetica [sic] Vulnerum Curatione in Sylvester Rattray's Theatrum Sympatheticum Auctum (Nürnberg 1662, pp. 177–225). It was translated into German by F. J. Schmidt (Hamm 1978, pp. 5–63).]
- Apologeticus Pro Astromantia Discursus, Marburg 1611
- "Idea Philosophiae Platonicae"., Marburg 1612
- Loimographia, Frankfurt 1613
- Physicae Generalis Libri II, Frankfurt 1613
- Responsio ad quaestionem propositam, in: Promotio Solennis XX. Magistrorum (July 14, 1614), Marburg 1614, pp. 34–43
- Uraniae Divinatricis, Quoad Astrologiae generalia, Libri II (added to Augustini Niphi, De Auguriis, Libri II, Marburg 1614)
- Pro Artium Mathematicarum Laude, dignitate & praestantia, Oratio (1613), Marburg 1615
- Urania Cum Geminis Filiabus, Frankfurt 1615
- Synarthrosis Magnetica, Opposita Infaustae Anatomiae Joh. Roberti D. Theologi, Et Jesuitae, Pro Defensione Tractactus, de Magnetica vulnerum curatione, Marburg 1617 [translated into German by F. J. Schmidt: Wiederaufbau zur Verteidigung des Traktats über magnetische Wundheilung: gegen die glücklose Anatomie des Johannes Roberti SJ, Hamm 1979.] Against Jean Roberti.
- Tractatus De Portentosis Ac Luxuriosis Nostri Seculi Conviviis et Commessationibus, Marburg 1617
- Acroteleution Astrologicum, Marburg 1618
- Morosophia Ioannis Roberti D. Iesuitae, In Refutatione Synarthroseos Goclenianae, Anno 1618, Frankfurt 1619 [against Roberti]
- Assertio Medicinae Universalis Adversus Universalem Vulgo jactatam, Marburg 1620
- Synopsis Methodica Geometriae, Astronomiae, Astrologiae, Opticae & Geographiae, Frankfurt 1620
- Physiognomica & Chiromantica Specialia, Marburg 1621

Published after Goclenius' death:

- Tractatus Physicus & Medicus: De Sanorum Diaeta, Frankfurt 1621, 1645
- Experiment Buch, Frankfurt 1623, 1642 [with a foreword by Theodor Christoph Goclenius]
- Mirabilium Naturae Liber, Frankfurt 1625, 1643 [with a dedicatory letter by Theodor Christoph Goclenius]
- Physiognomica & Chiromantica Specialia, Frankfurt 1625, Halle 1652
- Physiognomica Et Chiromantica Specialia, Hamburg 1661 [enlarged edition]
- Besondere Physiognomische und Chiromantische Anmerckungen, Hamburg 1692 [German translation of the 1661 Hamburg edition of Physiognomica Et Chiromantica Specialia]
