= Montes Pyrenaeus =

Mountain range on the Moon

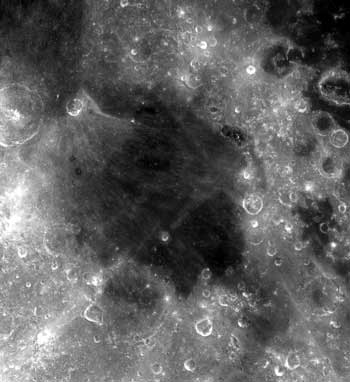
- Mare Nectaris, bordered on its eastern edge by Montes Pyrenaeus

Highest point
- Listing: Lunar mountains
- Coordinates: 15.6°S 41.2°E

Naming
- English translation: Pyrénées Mountains
- Language of name: Latin

Geography
- Location: the Moon

Montes Pyrenaeus is a mountain range on the Moon. The range begins at the southwestern rim of the flooded crater Gutenberg at the northern end and extends southward bordering the eastern edge of Mare Nectaris.

The selenographic coordinates of this range are 15.6° S, 41.2° E, and it lies within a diameter of 164 km. Johannes Mädler gave this range the Latin name for the Pyrenees Mountains that lie along the border between France and Spain.
