= Goclenius (crater) =

Crater on the Moon

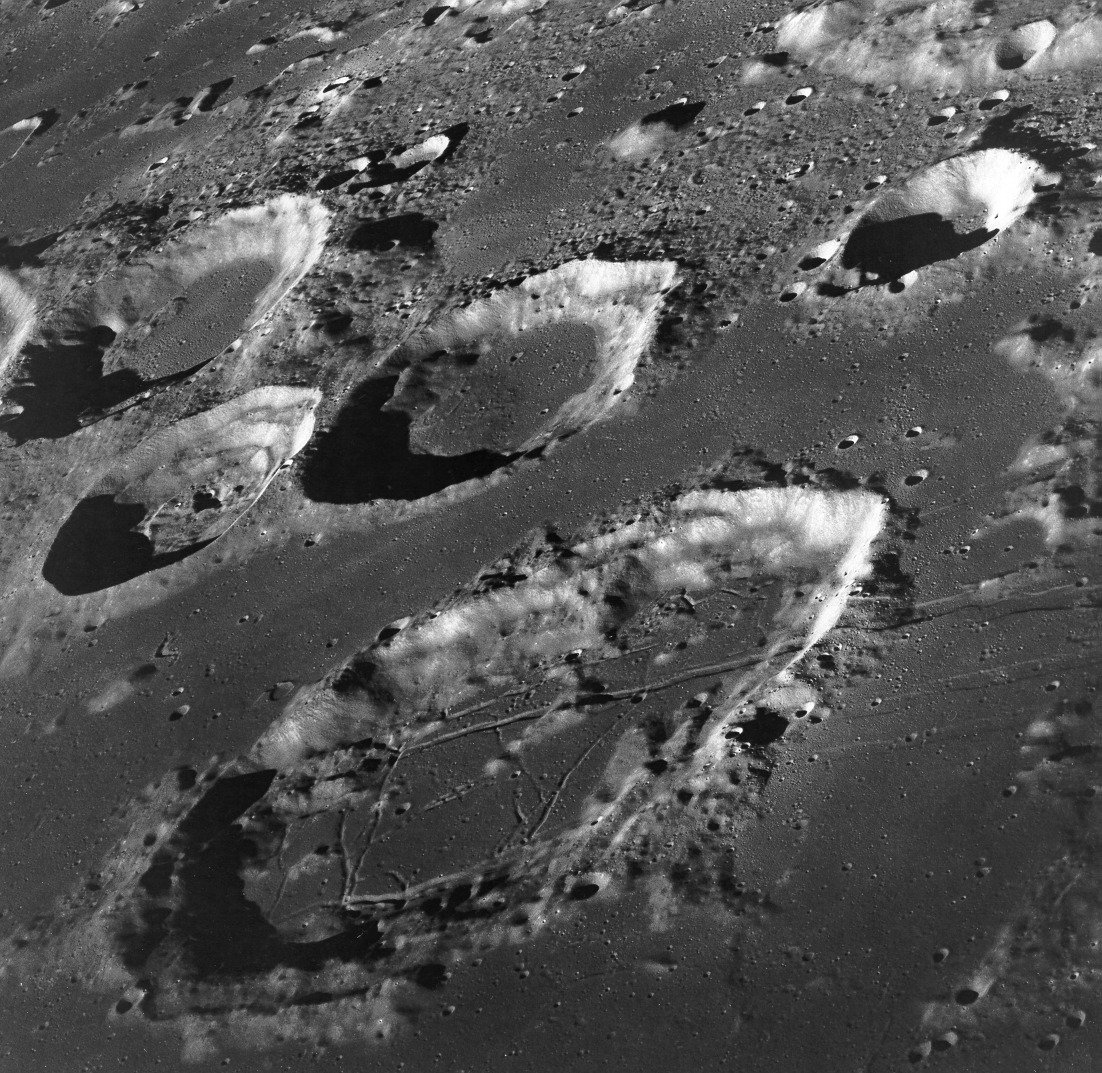
- Goclenius (bottom) and Magelhaens (center), from Apollo 8
- Coordinates: 10.05°S 45.03°E
- Diameter: 54 × 72 km (73.04 km)
- Depth: 2.2 km (1.4 mi)
- Colongitude: 315° at sunrise
- Eponym: Rudolf Goclenius, Jr.

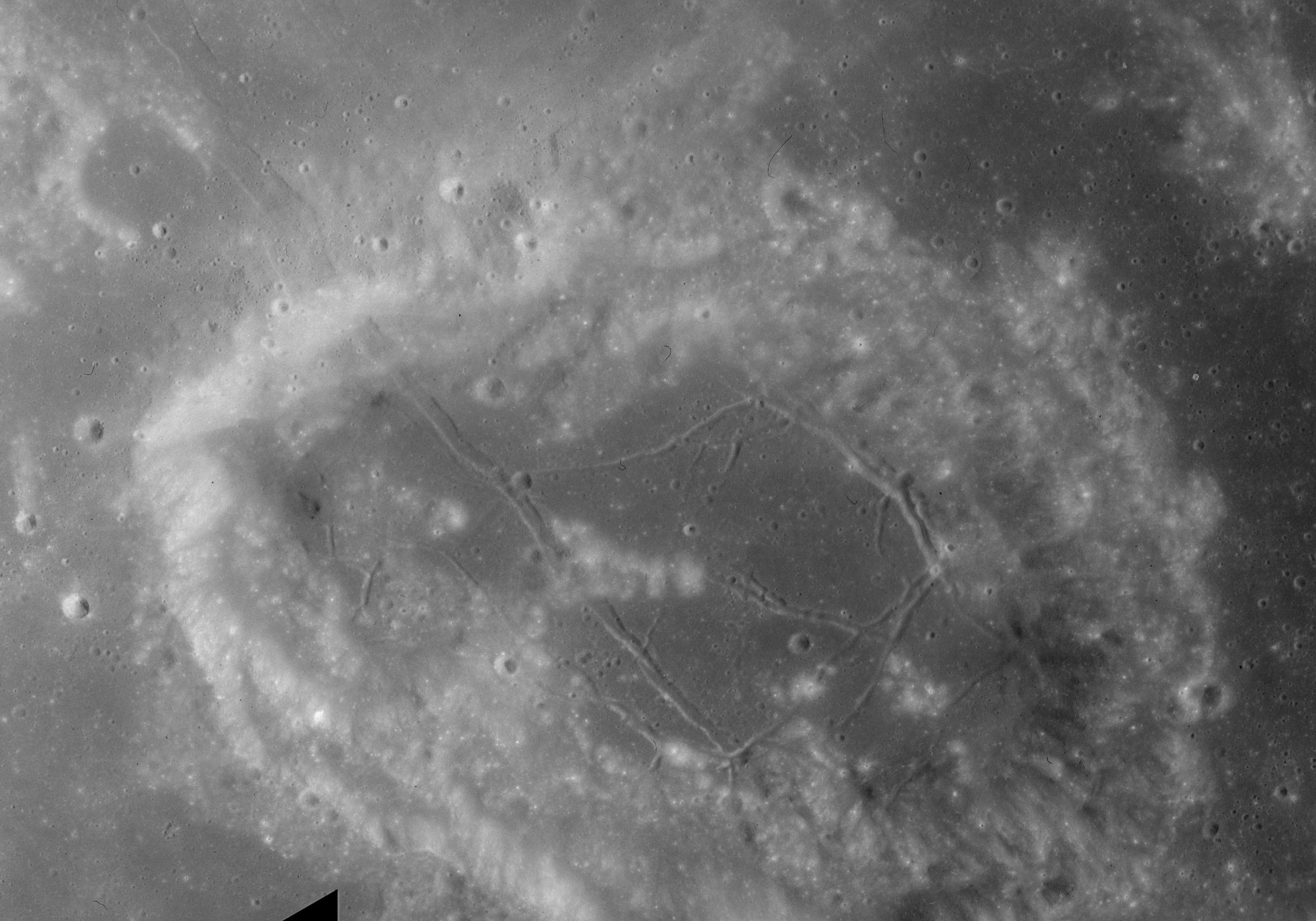
Apollo 16 image

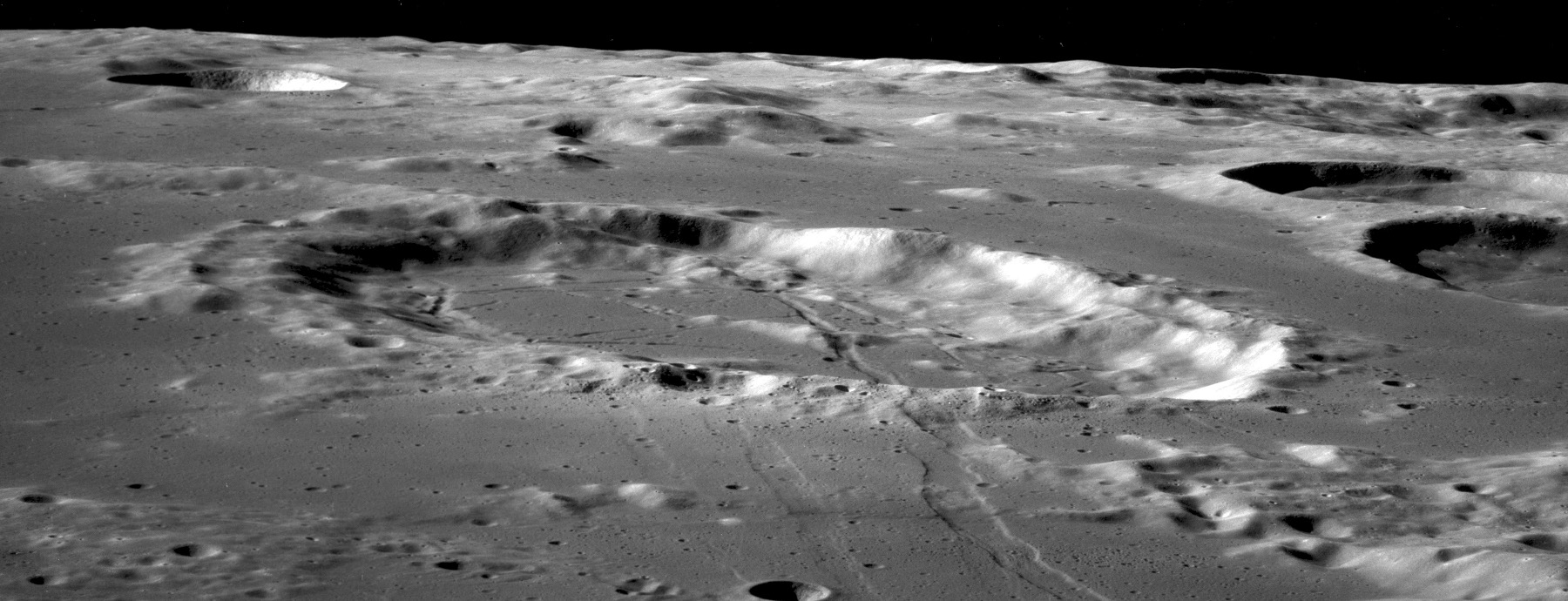
Oblique view from Apollo 11

Goclenius is a lunar impact crater that is located near the west edge of Mare Fecunditatis. It lies to the southeast of the lava-flooded crater Gutenberg, and north of Magelhaens. To the northwest is a parallel rille system that follow a course toward the northwest, running for a length of up to 240 kilometers. This feature is named the Rimae Goclenius.

The rim of this crater is worn, distorted and irregular, having a somewhat egg-like outline. The crater floor has been covered in lava, and a rille cuts across the floor towards the northwest, in the same direction as the other members of the Rimae Goclenius. A similar rille lies across the floor of Gutenberg, and it is likely that these features were all formed at the same time, after the original craters were created.

There is a low central rise located to the northwest of the crater's midpoint.

The crater is named for Rudolf Goclenius, Jr. (1572–1621), German physician and professor of physics, medicine and mathematics. It was officially adopted into lunar nomenclature by the International Astronomical Union in 1935.

== Satellite craters ==
By convention these features are identified on lunar maps by placing the letter on the side of the crater midpoint that is closest to Goclenius.

Goclenius	Latitude	Longitude	Diameter
B	9.2° S	44.4° E	7 km
U	9.3° S	50.1° E	22 km

The following craters have been renamed by the IAU.

- Goclenius A — See Ibn Battuta.
