= Magelhaens (lunar crater) =

Lunar impact crater

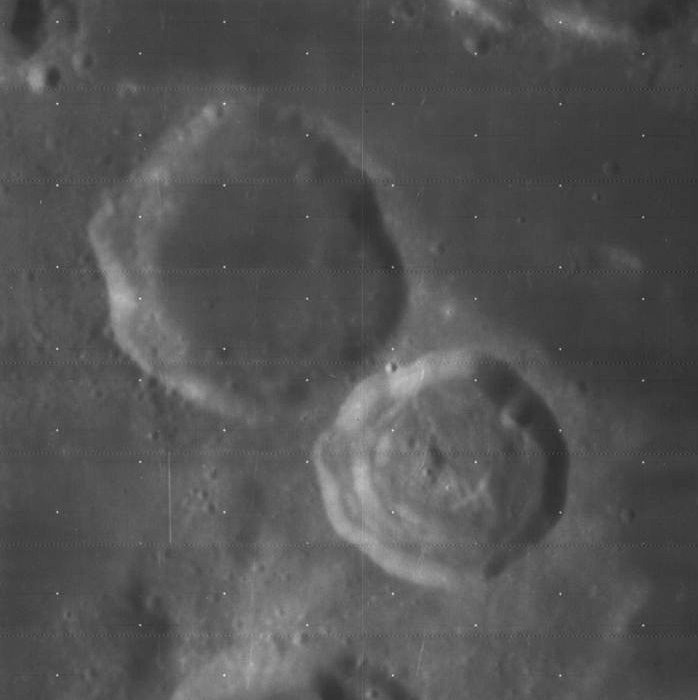
- Lunar Orbiter 4 image of Magelhaens (upper left) and Magelhaens A (lower right)
- Coordinates: 11.9°S 44.1°E
- Diameter: 41 km
- Depth: 2.0 km
- Colongitude: 316° at sunrise
- Eponym: Ferdinand Magellan

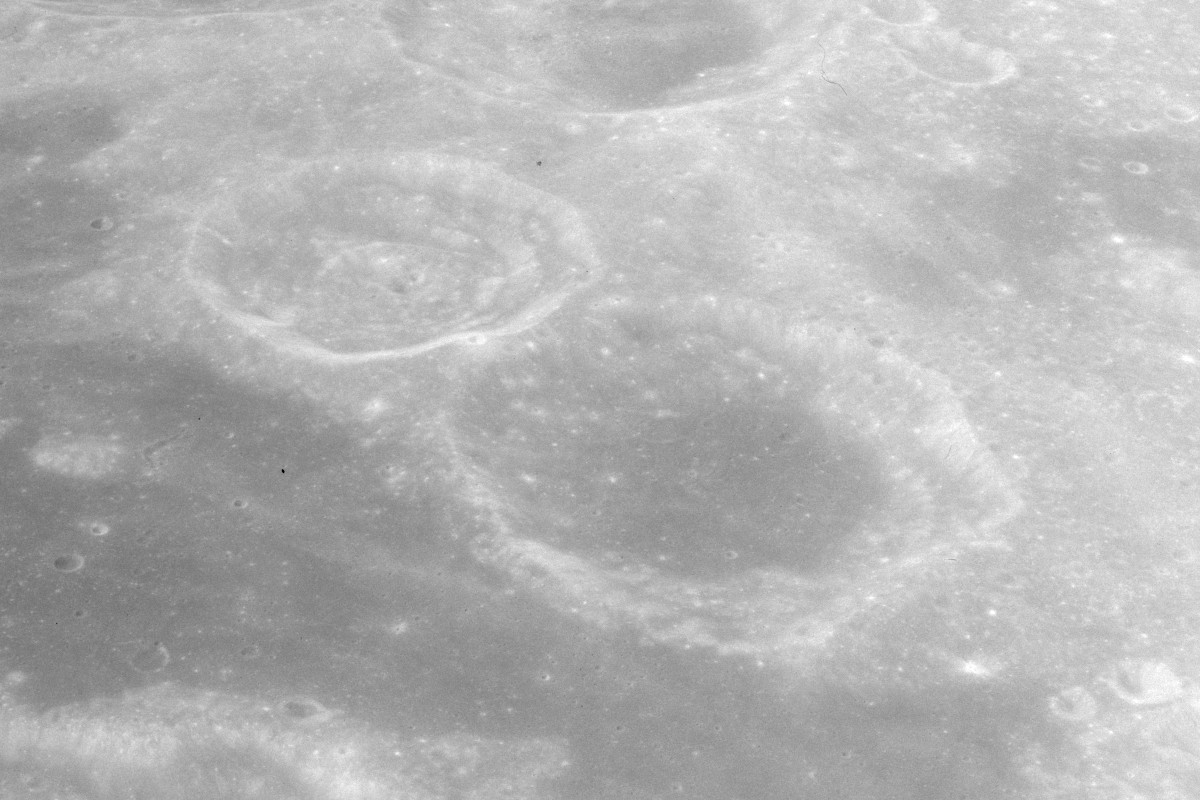
Oblique view facing south from Apollo 16

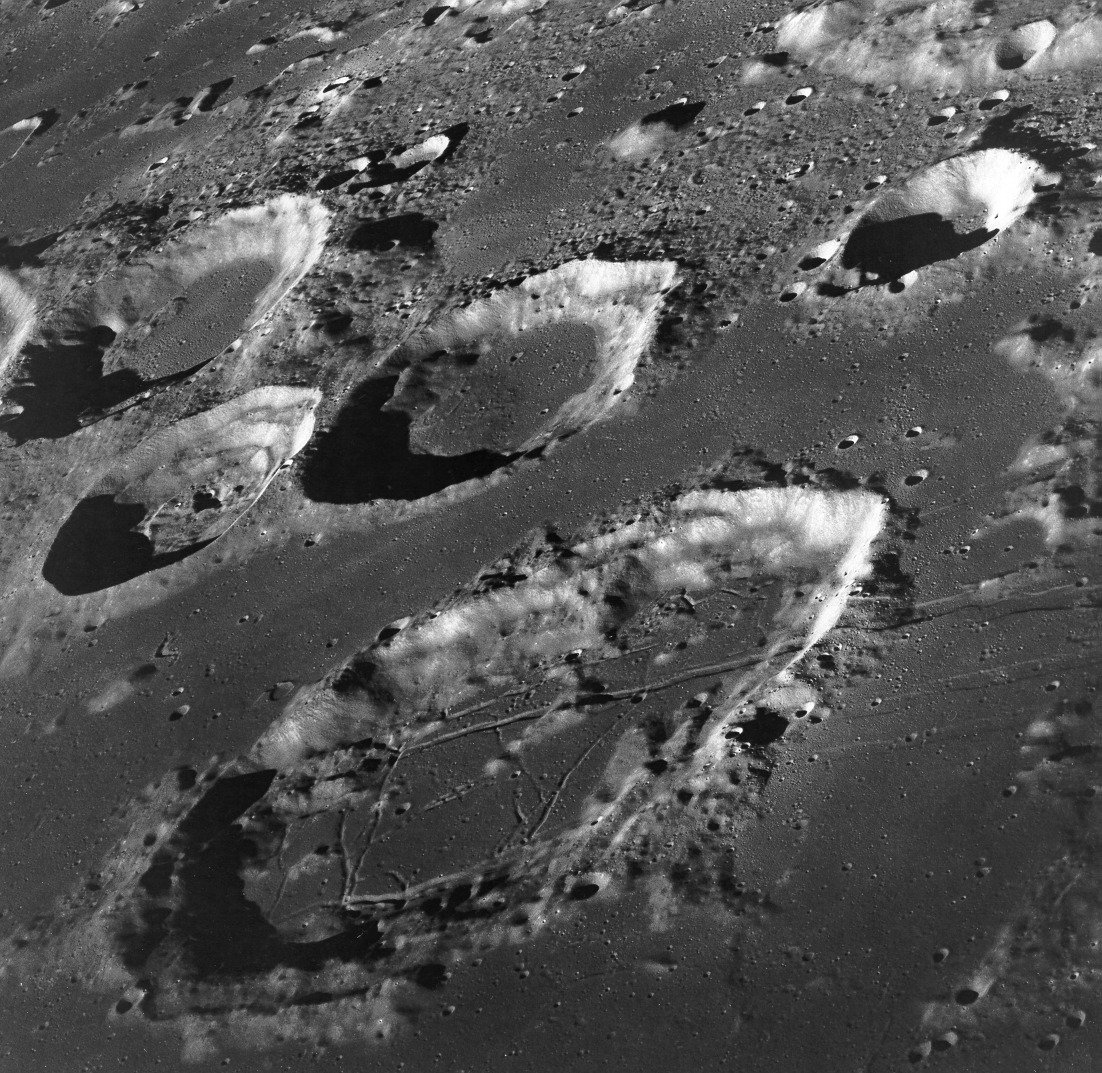
Magelhaens is just above center in this image taken by the crew of Apollo 8. Magelhaens A is left of center, and Goclenius is in foreground. NASA photo.

Magelhaens is a lunar impact crater that lies along the southwestern edge of the Mare Fecunditatis, in the eastern part of the Moon's near side. It was named after 16th-century Portuguese explorer Ferdinand Magellan. It lies to the south-southwest of the crater Goclenius, about midway between Gutenberg to the northwest and Colombo to the southeast.

This crater has a somewhat slender and uneven outer rim that is only roughly circular. The slightly smaller satellite crater Magelhaens A is attached to the southeastern rim. Within the inner walls of Magelhaens, the interior floor has been resurfaced by basaltic lava, matching the same dark appearance as the lunar mare to the northeast. This floor is level and almost featureless.

== Satellite craters ==
By convention these features are identified on lunar maps by placing the letter on the side of the crater midpoint that is closest to Magelhaens.

Magelhaens	Latitude	Longitude	Diameter
A	12.6° S	45.0° E	32 km

== See also ==
- List of craters on the Moon
