= Mädler (lunar crater) =

Crater on the Moon

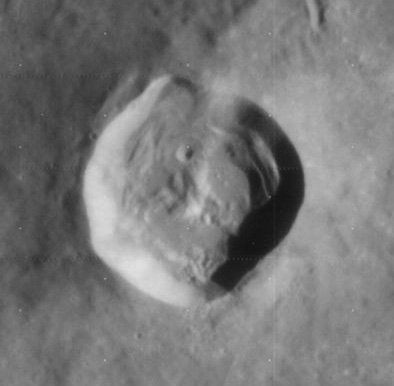
- Lunar Orbiter 4 image
- Coordinates: 11.0°S 29.8°E
- Diameter: 28 km
- Depth: 2.8 km
- Colongitude: 330° at sunrise
- Eponym: Johann H. Mädler

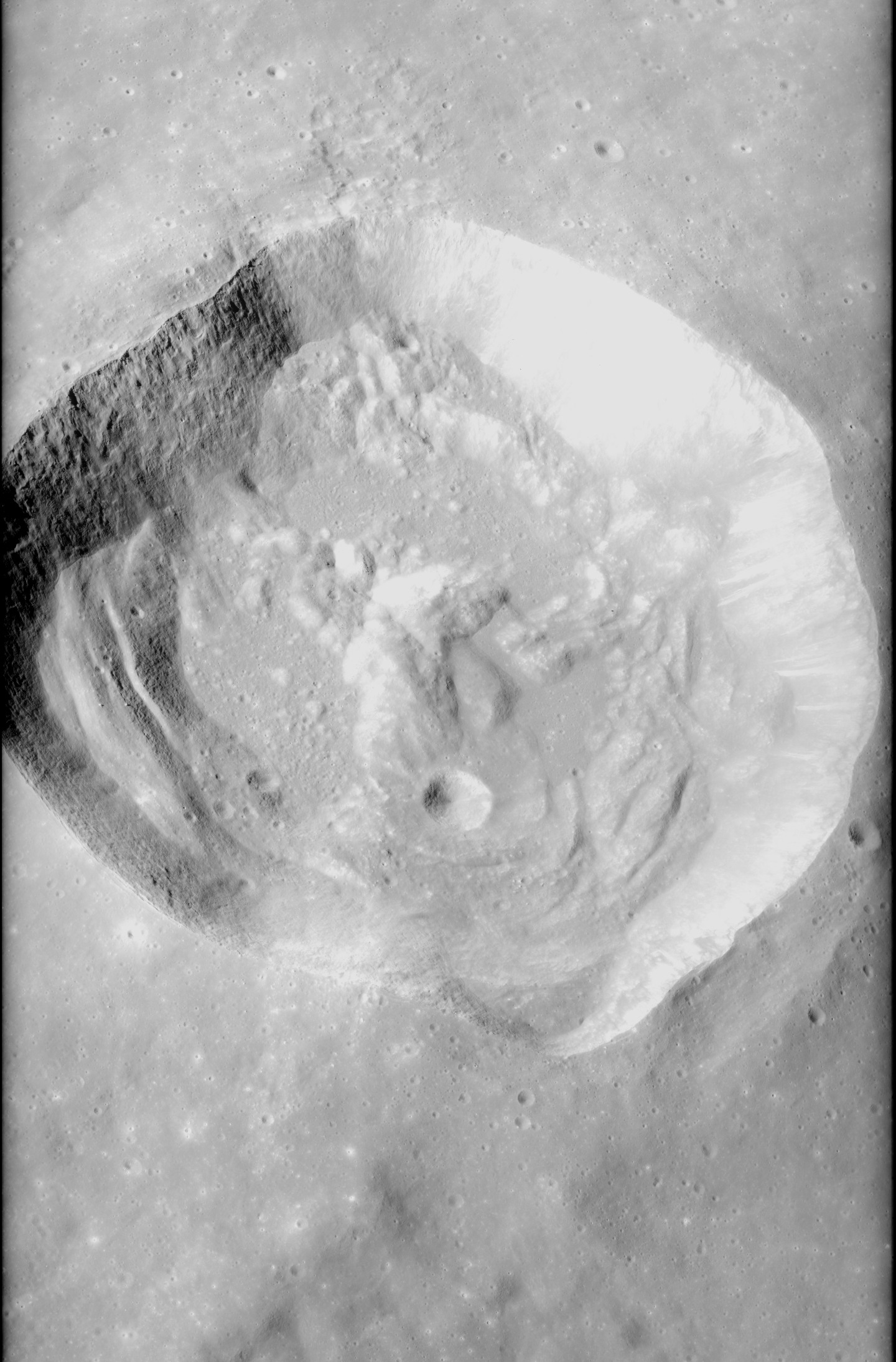
Oblique view of Mädler from Apollo 16 Panoramic Camera

Mädler is a lunar impact crater located on the mare that joins Sinus Asperitatis in the north to Mare Nectaris to the southeast. To the west is the prominent crater Theophilus, and Mädler lies amidst the outer rampart.

The rim of Mädler is irregular and somewhat oblong in shape. There is a low central peak that joins a ridge crossing the floor. The crater includes a 6.1-km long lobate scarp. To the east of the crater are ray markings that include a ring-shape to the northeast. The infrared spectrum of pure crystalline plagioclase has been identified on the southeastern rim.

== Satellite craters ==
By convention these features are identified on lunar maps by placing the letter on the side of the crater midpoint that is closest to Mädler.

Mädler	Latitude	Longitude	Diameter
A	9.5° S	29.8° E	5 km
D	12.6° S	31.1° E	4 km
