= Torricelli (crater) =

Crater on the Moon

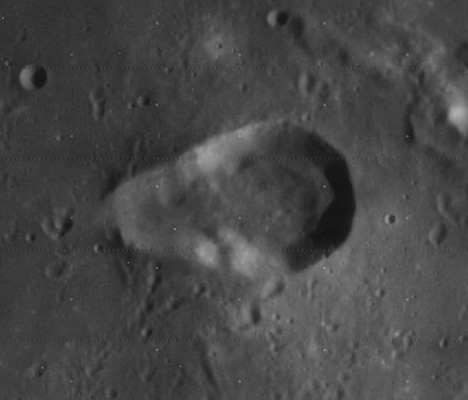
- Lunar Orbiter 4 image
- Coordinates: 4.6°S 28.5°E
- Diameter: 23 km
- Depth: 2.5 km
- Colongitude: 331° at sunrise
- Eponym: Evangelista Torricelli

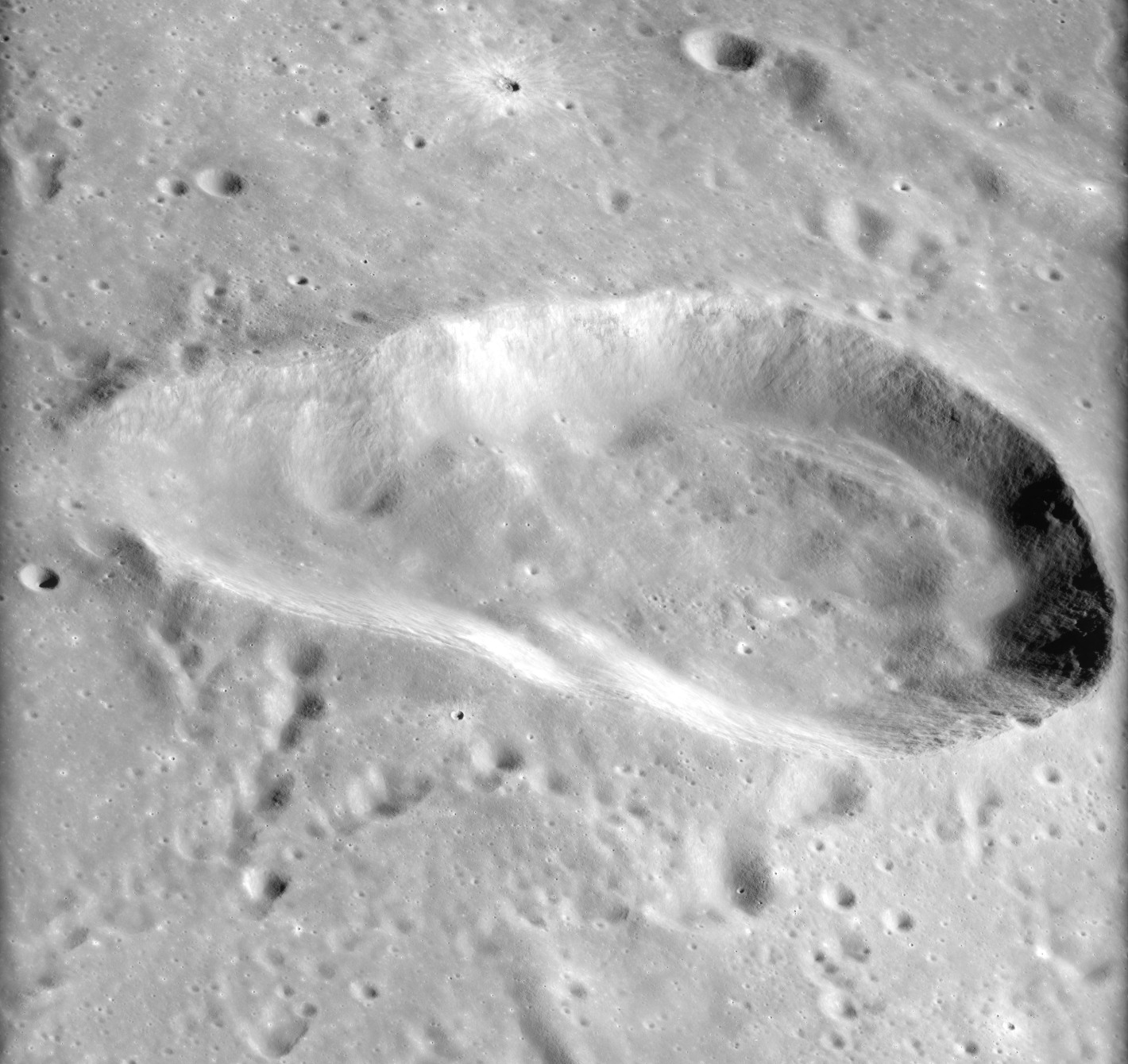
Oblique view of Torricelli from Apollo 16. NASA photo.

Torricelli is a lunar impact crater in the eastern part of the Sinus Asperitatis, to the south of the Mare Tranquillitatis. It was named after Italian physicist Evangelista Torricelli. The western rim of the crater is broken open and joined to a smaller crater to the west. The entire formation has a pear-shaped appearance. Torricelli lies in the northeastern part of a circular formation of rises in the lunar mare, possibly the remains of a crater formation buried by lava.

== Torricelli B - januari 29, 1983 ==
During the night of january 29, 1983, British observers of the moon discovered and observed a bright bluish or violet shine at and around satellite craterlet Torricelli B, north-northeast of Torricelli itself. Observers of the full moon know the slightly bluish appearance of Torricelli B.

== Satellite craters ==
By convention these features are identified on lunar maps by placing the letter on the side of the crater midpoint that is closest to Torricelli.

Torricelli	Latitude	Longitude	Diameter
A	4.5° S	29.8° E	11 km
B	2.6° S	29.1° E	7 km
C	2.7° S	26.0° E	11 km
F	4.2° S	29.4° E	7 km
G	1.4° S	27.0° E	4 km
H	3.3° S	25.3° E	7 km
J	3.6° S	25.1° E	5 km
K	4.0° S	25.2° E	6 km
L	3.5° S	24.3° E	4 km
M	3.6° S	31.2° E	14 km
N	6.1° S	29.2° E	4 km
P	6.5° S	29.9° E	4 km
R	5.2° S	28.1° E	87 km
T	4.2° S	27.5° E	3 km
