= Mare Nectaris =

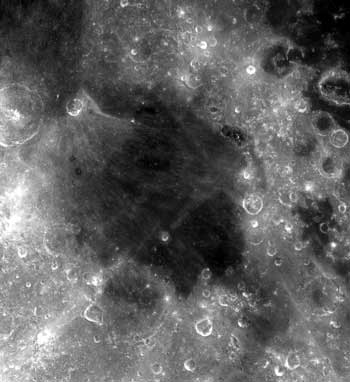
- Mare Nectaris
- Coordinates: 15.2°S 34.6°E
- Diameter: 340 km (210 mi)
- Eponym: Sea of Nectar

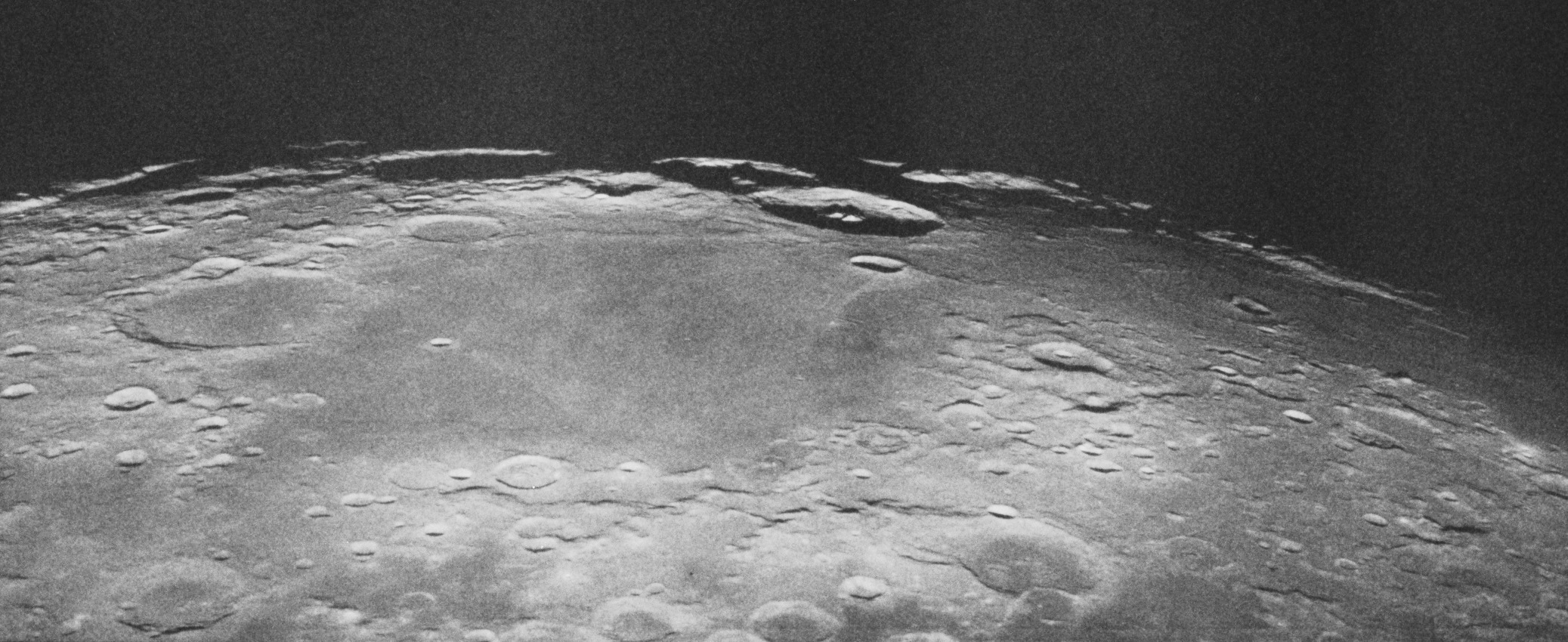
View from Apollo 8

Mare Nectaris /ˈnɛktərɪs/ (Latin nectaris, the "Sea of Nectar") is a small lunar mare or sea (a volcanic lava plain noticeably darker than the rest of the Moon's surface) located south of Mare Tranquillitatis southwest of Mare Fecunditatis, on the near side of the Moon. Montes Pyrenaeus borders the mare to the east and Sinus Asperitatis fuses to its northwestern edge. It is 84,000 square kilometers in size.

Several large craters are situated at the borders of Mare Nectaris. The biggest one is lava-filled Fracastorius (124 km), which fuses with the southern coast of the Sea. A prominent trio of 100-km craters Theophilus, Cyrillus and Catharina is located near northwestern coast. Other notable feature is a "ghost crater" Daguerre, almost entirely covered with lava, in the northern part of Mare Nectaris.

Mare Nectaris is located in the central part of a 860-km-diameter impact basin, which was formed 3.8–3.9 billion years ago. This event marks the beginning of Nectarian period of the lunar geologic timescale. The best-preserved part of the rim of this basin is called Rupes Altai, in the southwest part of the basin.

Lava filling of Mare Nectaris is younger than the basin itself. The mare material is approximately 1000m in depth, and mainly of the Nectarian period and the Lower Imbrian epoch, with the mare material of the Upper Imbrian epoch. The crater Theophilus on the northeastern side of the mare is of the Eratosthenian period. Thus, the crater is younger than the mare to its southeast. Enough subsidence has occurred to open a few arcuate grabens on the western margin of the mare.

A mass concentration (mascon), or gravitational high, was identified in the center of Mare Nectaris from Doppler tracking of the five Lunar Orbiter spacecraft in 1968. The mascon was confirmed and mapped at higher resolution with later orbiters such as Lunar Prospector and GRAIL.

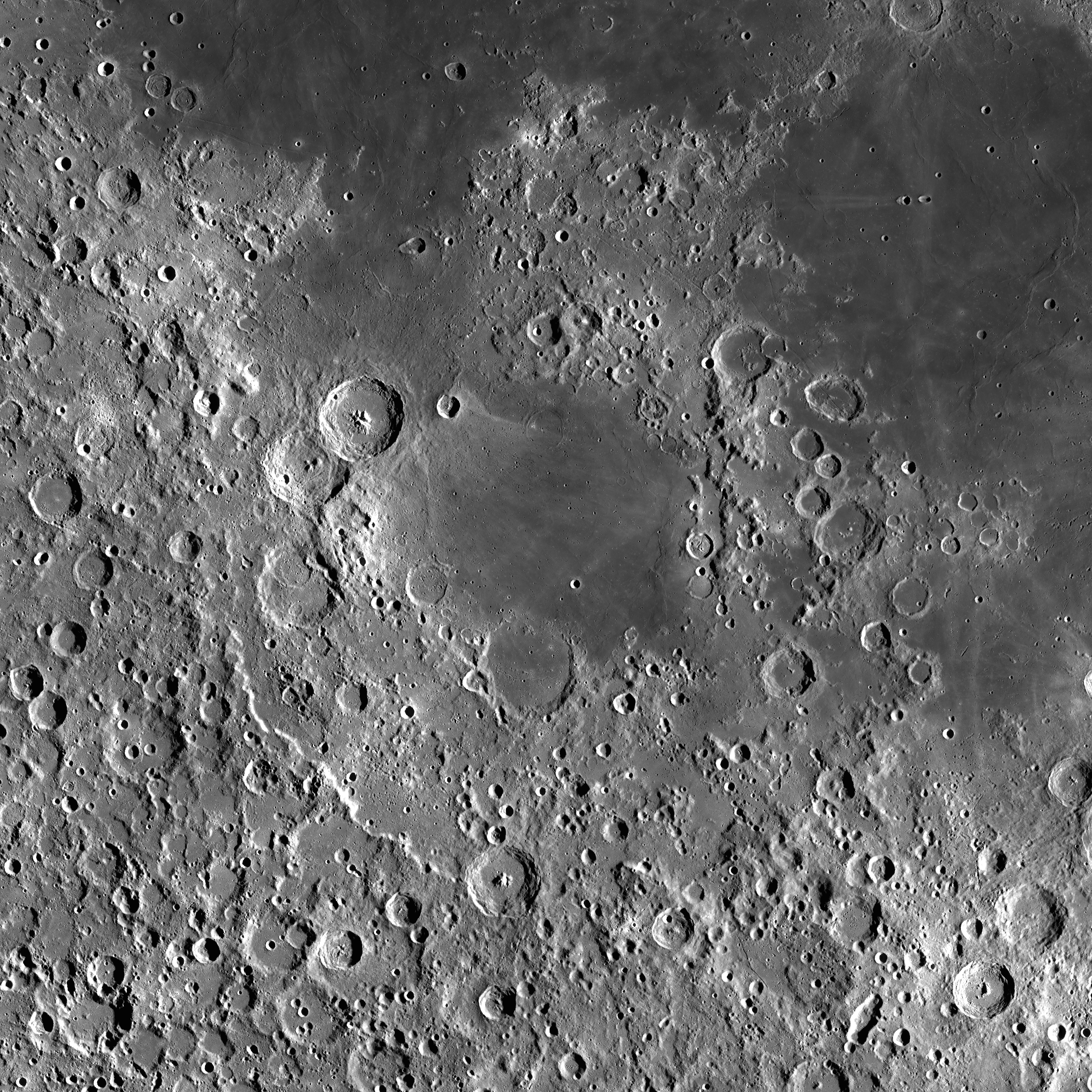
Basin of Mare Nectaris (LRO image mosaic). Rupes Altai is a thin bright streak in the lower left

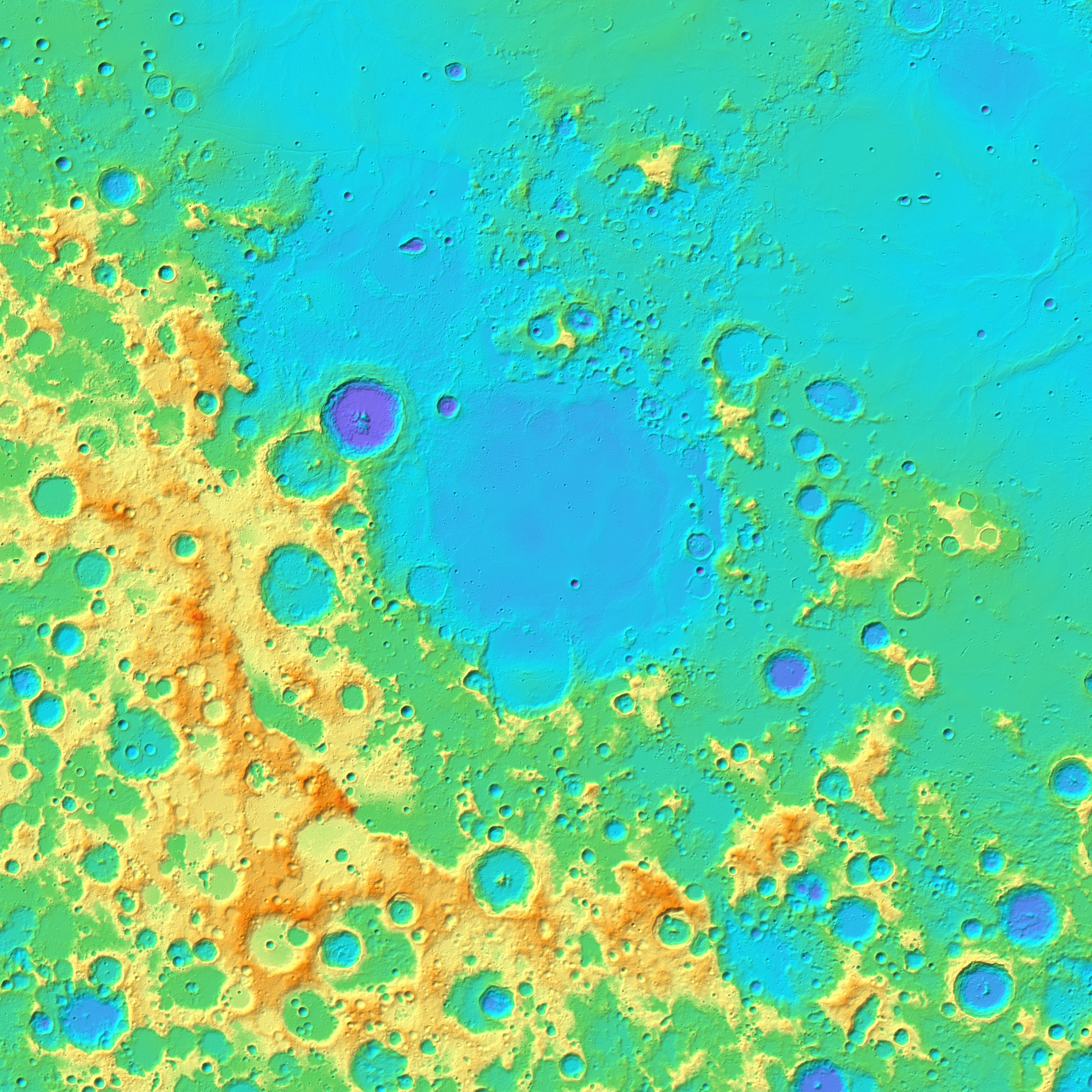
Topographic map of the same area (LRO data)

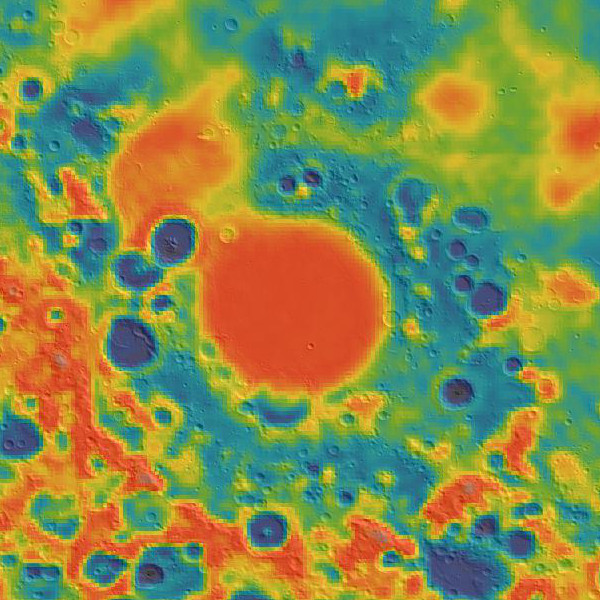
Gravity map based on GRAIL

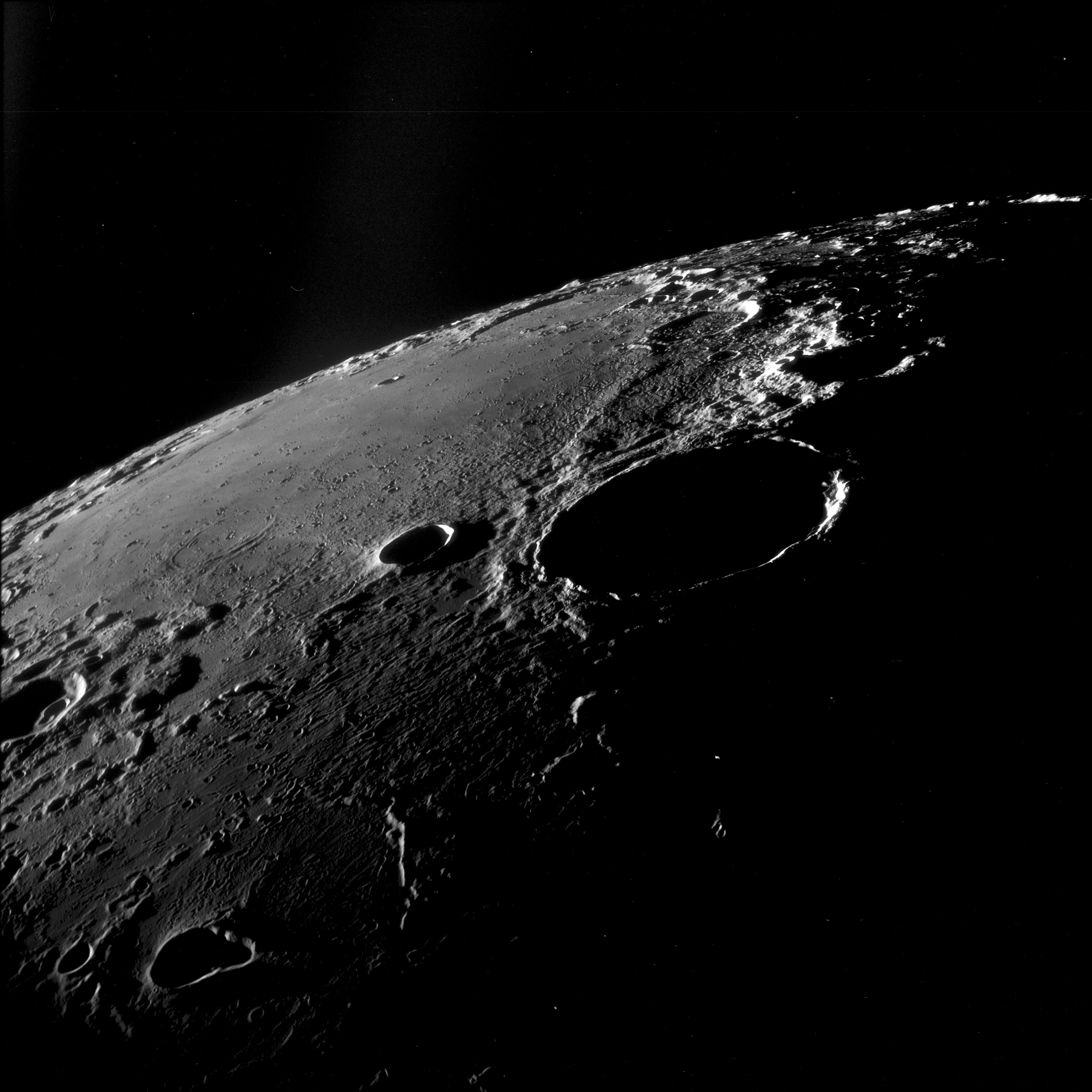
Oblique view facing southeast, from Apollo 11. The large crater right of center is Theophilus, and Mädler is to its left. Fracastorius is near the central horizon, and the white mountain on the horizon at right is part of the Rupes Altai. The teardrop-shaped crater in the lower left is Torricelli.

== See also ==
- Volcanism on the Moon
- Smart Lander for Investigating Moon
