= Theophilus (crater) =

Lunar surface depression

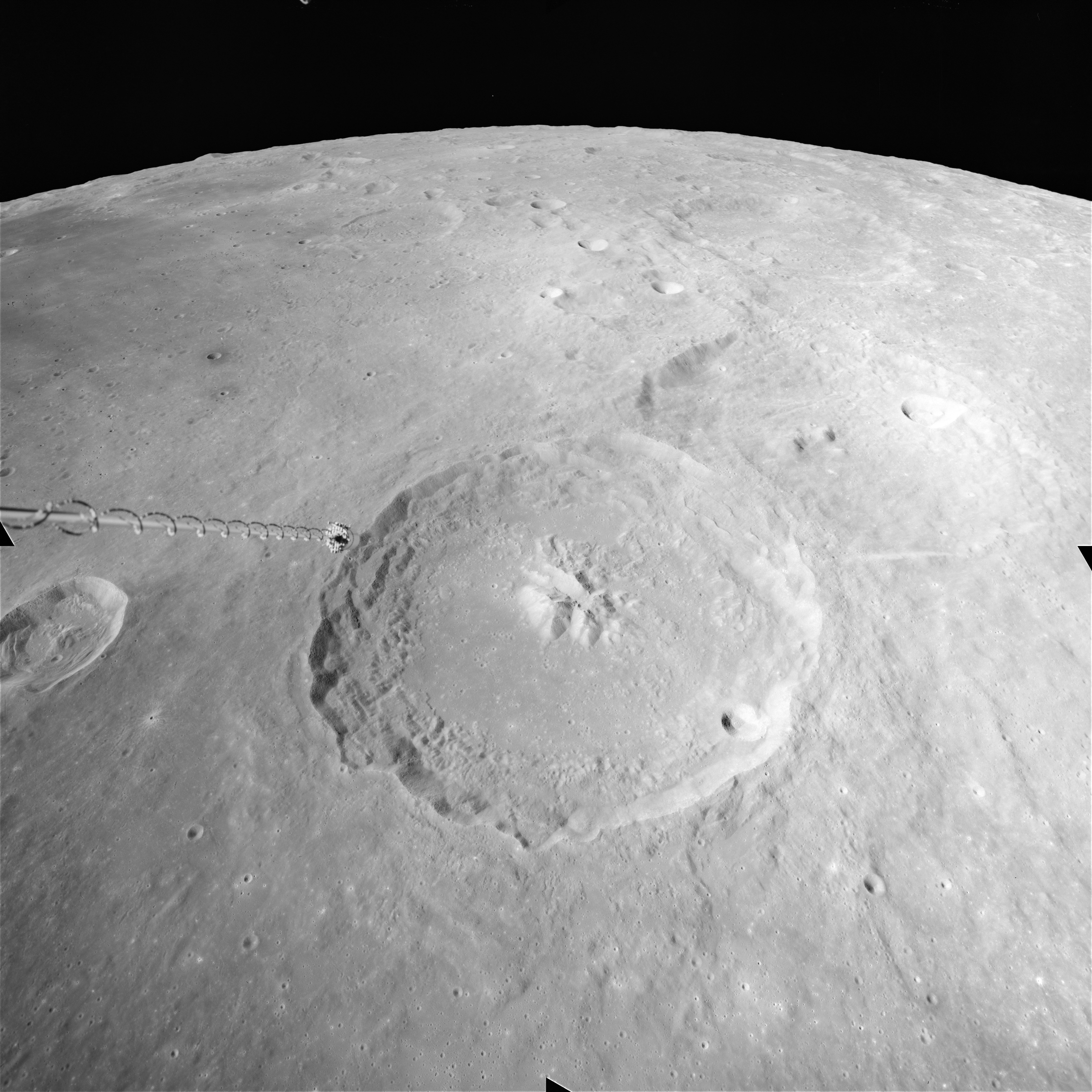
- Oblique view facing south from Apollo 16
- Coordinates: 11.4°S 26.4°E
- Diameter: 100 km
- Depth: 4.1 km
- Colongitude: 333° at sunrise
- Formation: Eratosthenian
- Eponym: Theophilus I of Alexandria

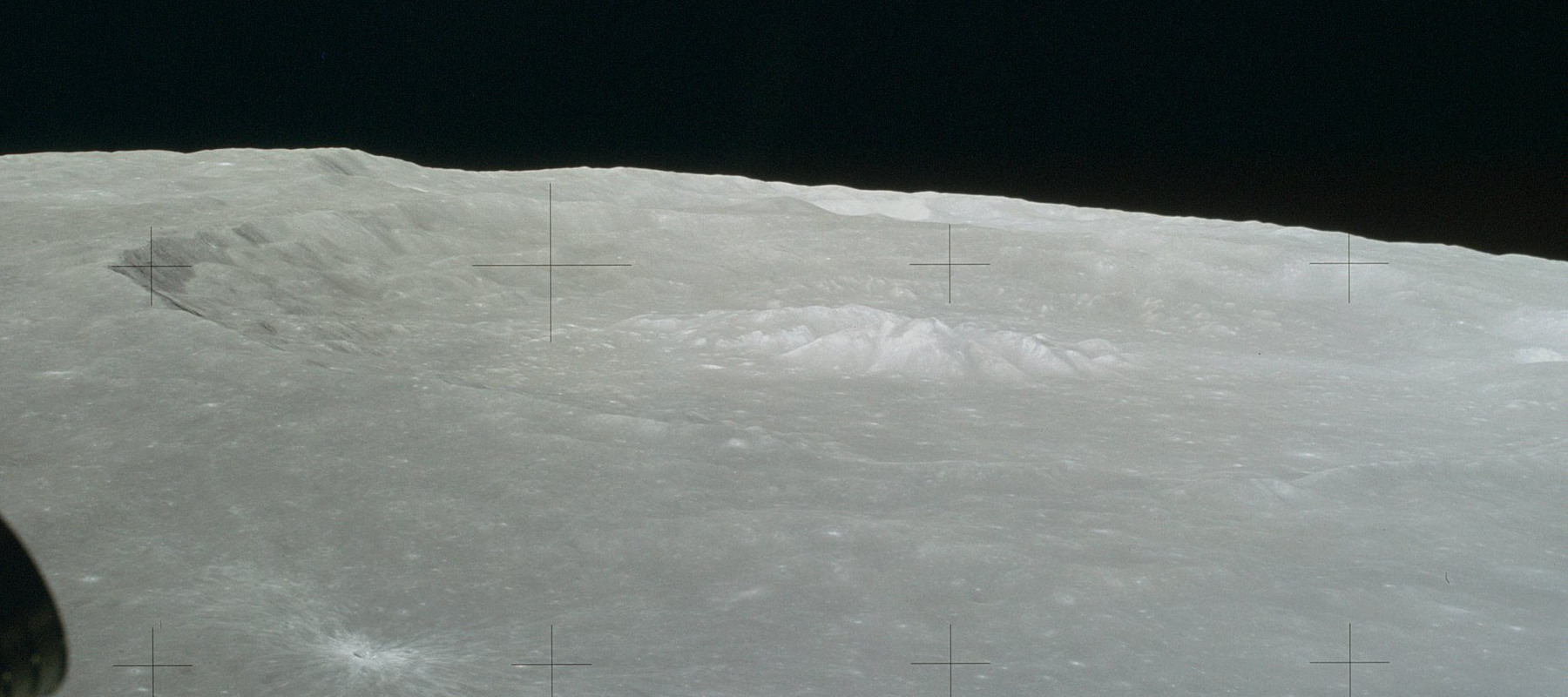
Oblique view of Theophilus from Apollo 16 as the lunar module Orion approached its landing point about 450 km to the west

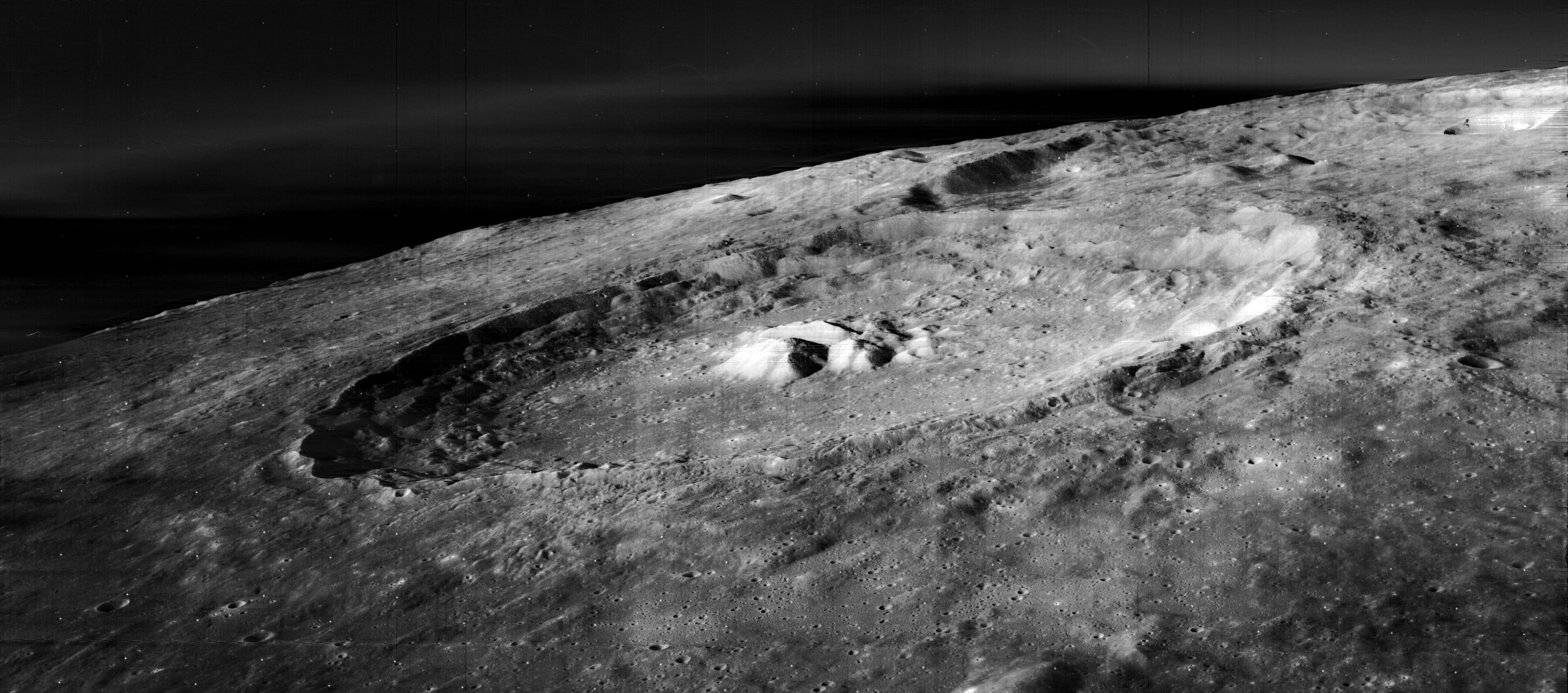
Oblique view of Theophilus from Lunar Orbiter 3

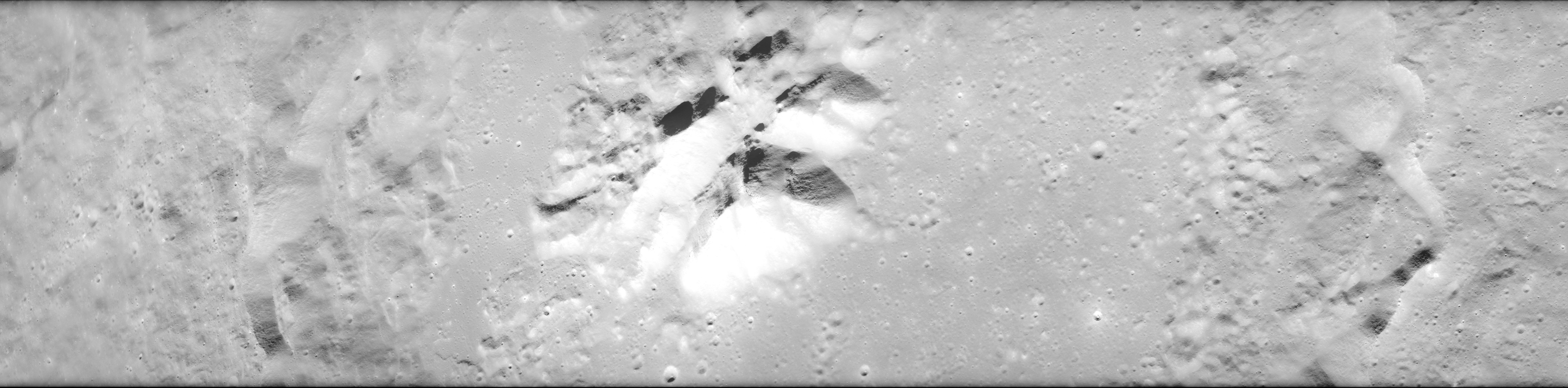
Oblique view of the central part of Theophilus from Apollo 16 Panoramic Camera

Theophilus is a prominent lunar impact crater that lies between Sinus Asperitatis in the north and Mare Nectaris to the southeast. It partially intrudes into the comparably sized crater Cyrillus to the southwest. To the east is the smaller crater Mädler and further to the south-southeast is Beaumont. It was named after the 4th-century Coptic Pope Theophilus I of Alexandria.

Theophilus, Cyrillus and Catharina form a prominent group of large craters visible on the terminator 5 days after the new moon.

== Description ==
The rim of Theophilus has a wide, terraced inner surface that shows indications of landslips. British astronomer T. W. Webb called this "the deepest of all visible craters". It is 4,200 metres deep with massive walls and has broken into a second formation, Cyrillus. It was created during the Eratosthenian period, from 3.2 to 1.1 billion years ago. It has an imposing central mountain, 1,400 metres high, with four summits.

The floor of the crater is relatively flat, and it has a large, triple-peaked central mountain that climbs to a height of about 2 kilometres above the floor. The western peak is designated Psi (ψ), the eastern Phi (φ), and the northern peak is Alpha (α) Theophilus. The western slopes of this ridge are wider and more irregular, whereas the peaks descend more sharply to the floor on the northern and western faces. Anorthosite with a very low mafic abundance and the infrared spectrum of pure crystalline plagioclase have been detected in these peaks.

The northwestern section of the rim of Theophilus shows the bright satellite crater Theophilus B. The brightness of Theophilus B and of the system of central peaks in Theophilus is also noticeable on the photographic version of chart LAC 78 (page 156) in The Clementine Atlas of the Moon (Ben Bussey / Paul D. Spudis).

The Apollo 16 mission collected several pieces of basalt that are believed to be ejecta from the formation of Theophilus.

== Satellite craters ==
By convention these features are identified on lunar maps by placing the letter on the side of the crater midpoint that is closest to Theophilus.

Theophilus	Latitude	Longitude	Diameter
B	10.5° S	25.2° E	8 km
E	6.8° S	24.0° E	21 km
F	8.0° S	26.0° E	13 km
G	7.2° S	25.7° E	19 km
K	12.5° S	26.3° E	6 km
W	7.8° S	28.6° E	4 km
