= List of lunar features =

Lunar nearside with major maria and craters labeled

Moon 360 animation in 4K

The surface of the Moon has many features, including mountains and valleys, craters, and plains, amongst others.

== Lunar plain features ==
Lunar maria (singular mare) are large, dark, regions of the Moon. They do not contain any water, but are believed to have been formed from molten rock from the Moon's mantle coming out onto the surface of the Moon. This list also includes the one oceanus and the features known by the names lacus, palus and sinus. The modern system of lunar nomenclature was introduced in 1651 by Riccioli. Riccioli's map of the Moon was drawn by Francesco Maria Grimaldi, who has a crater named after him.

There is also a region on the Lunar farside that was briefly misidentified as a mare and named Mare Desiderii (Sea of Desire). It is no longer recognized. Other former maria include:

- Mare Parvum ("Small Sea"), immediately to the east of Inghirami
- Mare Incognitum ("Unknown Sea")
- Mare Novum ("New Sea"), northeast of Plutarch
- Mare Struve ("Struve's Sea"), near Messala

A related set of features are the Lunar lacus (singular lacus, Latin for "lake"), which are smaller basaltic plains of similar origin. A related set of features are the sinus (singular sinus, Latin for "bay") and paludes (singular palus, Latin for "marsh"). Some sources also list a Palus Nebularum ("Marsh of Mists") at 38.0° N, 1.0° E, but the designation for this feature has not been officially recognized by the IAU.

== Craters ==
The large majority of these features are impact craters. The crater nomenclature is governed by the International Astronomical Union, and this list only includes features that are officially recognized by that scientific society. The lunar craters are listed in the following subsections. Where a formation has associated satellite craters (smaller associated craters), these are detailed on the main crater description pages.

List of craters on the Moon

- A
- B
- C
- D
- E
- F
- G
- H
- I
- J
- K
- L
- M
- N
- O
- P
- Q
- R
- S
- T
- U
- V
- W
- X
- Y
- Z

== Catenae ==
A catena is a chain of craters.

Name	Coordinates	Diameter	Name origin
Catena Abulfeda	16.9°S 17.2°E	219 km	After nearby crater Abulfeda
Catena Artamonov	26.0°N 105.9°E	134 km	After nearby crater Artamonov
Catena Brigitte	18.5°N 27.5°E	5 km	French feminine name
Catena Davy	11.0°S 7.0°W	50 km	After nearby crater Davy
Catena Dziewulski	19.0°N 100.0°E	80 km	After nearby crater Dziewulski
Catena Gregory	0.6°S 129.9°E	152 km	After nearby crater Gregory
Catena Humboldt	21.5°S 84.6°E	165 km	After nearby crater Humboldt
Catena Krafft	15.0°N 72.0°W	60 km	After nearby crater Krafft
Catena Kurchatov	37.2°N 136.3°E	226 km	After nearby crater Kurchatov
Catena Leuschner	4.7°N 110.1°W	364 km	After nearby crater Leuschner
Catena Littrow	22.2°N 29.5°E	10 km	After nearby crater Littrow
Catena Lucretius	3.4°S 126.1°W	271 km	After nearby crater Lucretius
Catena Mendeleev	6.3°N 139.4°E	188 km	After nearby crater Mendeleev
Catena Michelson	1.4°N 113.4°W	456 km	After nearby crater Michelson
Catena Pierre	19.8°N 31.8°W	9 km	French masculine name
Catena Sumner	37.3°N 112.3°E	247 km	After nearby crater Sumner
Catena Sylvester	81.4°N 86.2°W	173 km	After nearby crater Sylvester
Catena Taruntius	3.0°N 48.0°E	100 km	After nearby crater Taruntius
Catena Timocharis	29.0°N 13.0°W	50 km	After nearby crater Timocharis
Catena Yuri	24.4°N 30.4°W	5 km	Russian masculine name

== Valleys ==
Several large lunar valleys have been given names. Most of them are named after a nearby crater; see the list of craters on the Moon for more information.

Valley	Coordinates	Dimension	Eponym	Crater
Vallis Alpes	48.5°N 3.2°E	166 km	Latin name meaning "Alpine valley"	None
Vallis Baade	45.9°S 76.2°W	203 km	Walter Baade	Baade
Vallis Bohr	12.4°N 86.6°W	80 km	Niels Bohr	Bohr
Vallis Bouvard	38.3°S 83.1°W	284 km	Alexis Bouvard	None
Vallis Capella	7.6°S 34.9°E	49 km	Martianus Capella	Capella
Vallis Inghirami	43.8°S 72.2°W	148 km	Giovanni Inghirami	Inghirami
Vallis Palitzsch	26.4°S 64.3°E	132 km	Johann Palitzsch	Palitzsch
Vallis Planck	58.4°S 126.1°E	451 km	Max Planck	Planck
Vallis Rheita	42.5°S 51.5°E	445 km	Anton Maria Schyrleus of Rheita	Rheita
Vallis Schrödinger	67.0°S 105.0°E	310 km	Erwin Schrödinger	Schrödinger
Vallis Schröteri	26.2°N 50.8°W	168 km	Johann Hieronymus Schröter	Schröter
Vallis Snellius	31.1°S 56.0°E	592 km	Willebrord Snell	Snellius

== Mountains ==
The heights of the isolated mountains or massifs listed here are not consistently reported across sources. In the 1960s, the US Army Mapping Service used elevation relative to 1,737,988 meters from the center of the Moon. In the 1970s, the US Defense Mapping Agency used 1,730,000 meters. The Clementine topographic data published in the 1990s uses 1,737,400 meters.

This list is not comprehensive, and does not list the highest places on the Moon. Clementine data show a range of about 18,100 meters from lowest to highest point on the Moon. The highest point, located on the far side of the Moon, is approximately 6500 meters higher than Mons Huygens (usually listed as the tallest mountain).

Mountains are referred to using the Latin word mons (plural montes).

Name	Lat./Long.	Dia.	Ht.	Name origin
Mons Agnes	18.66°N 5.34°E	0.65 km	0.03 km	Greek feminine name
Mons Ampère	19.32°N 3.71°W	30 km	3.0 km	André-Marie Ampère, physicist
Mons André	5.18°N 120.56°E	10 km	7.0 km	French masculine name
Mons Ardeshir	5.03°N 121.04°E	8 km	5.9 km	Ardeshir (Ardashir), Persian male name
Mons Argaeus	19.33°N 29.01°E	50 km	2.6 km	Mount Erciyes, Asia Minor
Mont Blanc	45.41°N 0.44°E	25 km	3.6 km	Mont Blanc, the Alps
Mons Bradley	21.73°N 0.38°E	30 km	4.2 km	James Bradley, astronomer
Mons Delisle	29.42°N 35.79°W	30 km	1.0 km	Named after nearby crater Delisle
Mons Dieter	5.00°N 120.30°E	20 km	8.0 km	German masculine name
Mons Dilip	5.58°N 120.87°E	2 km	5.5 km	Indian masculine name
Mons Esam	14.61°N 35.71°E	8 km	0.4 km	Arabic masculine name
Mons Ganau	4.79°N 120.59°E	14 km	7.9 km	African masculine name
Mons Gruithuisen Delta	36.07°N 39.59°W	20 km	1.8 km	Named after nearby crater Gruithuisen
Mons Gruithuisen Gamma	36.56°N 40.72°W	20 km	1.5 km	Named after nearby crater Gruithuisen
Mons Hadley	26.69°N 4.12°E	25 km	4.6 km	John Hadley, inventor
Mons Hadley Delta	25.72°N 3.71°E	15 km	3.5 km	Named after nearby Mount Hadley
Mons Hansteen	12.19°S 50.21°W	30 km		Named after nearby crater Hansteen
Mons Herodotus	27.50°N 52.94°W	5 km	1.0 km	Named after nearby crater Herodotus
Mons Huygens	19.92°N 2.86°W	40 km	4.7 km	Christiaan Huygens, astronomer
Mons La Hire	27.66°N 25.51°W	25 km	1.5 km	Philippe de la Hire, astronomer
Mons Maraldi	20.34°N 35.50°E	15 km	1.3 km	Named after nearby crater Maraldi
Mons Moro	11.84°S 19.84°W	10 km		Antonio Lazzaro Moro, Earth scientist
Mons Penck	10.0°S 21.74°E	30 km	4.0 km	Albrecht Penck, geographer
Mons Pico	45.82°N 8.87°W	25 km	2.0 km	Spanish for "peak"
Mons Piton	40.72°N 0.92°W	25 km	2.3 km	El Pitón, a summit of Mount Teide, Tenerife
Mons Rümker	40.76°N 58.38°W	70 km	0.5 km	Karl Ludwig Christian Rümker, astronomer
Mons Usov	11.91°N 63.26°E	15 km		Mikhail Usov, geologist
Mons Vinogradov	22.35°N 32.52°W	25 km	1.4 km	Aleksandr Pavlovich Vinogradov, chemist
Mons Vitruvius	19.33°N 30.74°E	15 km	2.3 km	Named after nearby crater Vitruvius
Mons Wolff	16.88°N 6.80°W	35 km	3.5 km	Baron Christian von Wolff, philosopher

== Mountain ranges ==
Name	Lat./Long.	Dia.	Name origin
Montes Agricola	29.06°N 54.07°W	141 km	Georgius Agricola, Earth scientist
Montes Alpes	48.36°N 0.58°W	281 km	The Alps, Europe
Montes Apenninus	19.87°N 0.03°W	401 km	The Apennine Mountains, Italy
Montes Archimedes	25.39°N 5.25°W	163 km	Named after nearby crater Archimedes
Montes Carpatus	14.57°N 23.62°W	361 km	The Carpathian Mountains, Europe
Montes Caucasus	37.52°N 9.93°E	445 km	The Caucasus Mountains, Europe
Montes Cordillera	17.5°S 79.5°W	574 km	Spanish for "mountain chain"
Montes Haemus	17.11°N 12.03°E	560 km	Greek name for the Balkan Mountains
Montes Harbinger	26.89°N 41.29°W	90 km	Harbingers of dawn on the crater Aristarchus
Montes Jura	47.49°N 36.11°W	422 km	The Jura Mountains, Europe
Montes Pyrenaeus	14.05°S 41.51°E	164 km	The Pyrenees Mountains, Europe
Montes Recti	48.3°N 19.72°W	90 km	Latin for "straight range"
Montes Riphaeus	7.48°S 27.60°W	189 km	Greek name for the Ural Mountains, Russia
Montes Rook	20.6°S 82.5°W	791 km	Lawrence Rook, astronomer
Montes Secchi	2.72°N 43.17°E	50 km	Named after nearby crater Secchi
Montes Spitzbergen	34.47°N 5.21°W	60 km	Named after German for "sharp peaks" and for resemblance to the Spitsbergen islands
Montes Taurus	27.32°N 40.34°E	172 km	Taurus Mountains, Asia Minor
Montes Teneriffe	47.89°N 13.19°W	182 km	Tenerife island

== Other features ==
The Moon's surface exhibits many other geological features. In addition to mountains, valleys, and impact craters, the following surface features have received names in the Lunar nomenclature, many of them named after a nearby crater or mountain.

The listed diameter for these features is the longest dimension that contains the entire geological formation. The latitudes and longitudes are in selenographic coordinates.

=== Albedo ===
These features have a high albedo compared to the surrounding terrain.

Name	Coordinates	Diameter	Name origin
Reiner Gamma	7.5°N 59.0°W	70.0 km	After nearby crater Reiner

On the far side of the Moon there are unnamed albedo features on Mare Ingenii and Mare Marginis. These are located antipodal to the Mare Imbrium and Mare Orientale impact basins.

=== Dorsa ===
A dorsum (plural dorsa, meaning back or ridge) is a wrinkle-ridge system commonly found on lunar maria.

Name	Coordinates	Dia.	Name origin
Dorsa Aldrovandi	24.0°N 28.5°E	136 km	Ulisse Aldrovandi (1522–1605)
Dorsa Andrusov	1.0°S 57.0°E	160 km	Nicolai Ivanovich Andrusov (1861–1924)
Dorsum Arduino	24.9°N 35.8°W	107 km	Giovanni Arduino (1714–1795)
Dorsa Argand	28.1°N 40.6°W	109 km	Emile Argand (1879–1940)
Dorsum Azara	26.7°N 19.2°E	105 km	Félix Manuel de Azara (1746–1811)
Dorsa Barlow	15.0°N 31.0°E	120 km	William Barlow (1845–1934)
Dorsum Bucher	31.0°N 39.0°W	90 km	Walter Hermann Bucher (1889–1965)
Dorsum Buckland	20.4°N 12.8°E	380 km	William Buckland (1784–1856)
Dorsa Burnet	28.4°N 57.0°W	194 km	Thomas Burnet (1635–1715)
Dorsa Cato	1.0°N 47.0°E	140 km	Cato the Elder (234–149 BC)
Dorsum Cayeux	1.6°N 51.2°E	84 km	Lucien Cayeux (1864–1944)
Dorsum Cloos	1.0°N 91.0°E	100 km	Hans Cloos (1885–1951)
Dorsum Cushman	1.0°N 49.0°E	80 km	Joseph Augustine Cushman (1881–1949)
Dorsa Dana	3.0°N 90.0°E	70 km	James Dwight Dana (1813–1895)
Dorsa Ewing	10.2°S 39.4°W	141 km	William Maurice Ewing (1906–1974)
Dorsum Gast	24.0°N 9.0°E	60 km	Paul Werner Gast (1930–1973)
Dorsa Geikie	4.6°S 52.5°E	228 km	Sir Archibald Geikie (1835–1924)
Dorsum Grabau	29.4°N 15.9°W	121 km	Amadeus William Grabau (1870–1946)
Dorsum Guettard	10.0°S 18.0°W	40 km	Jean-Etienne Guettard (1715–1786)
Dorsa Harker	14.5°N 64.0°E	197 km	Alfred Harker (1859–1939)
Dorsum Heim	32.0°N 29.8°W	148 km	Albert Heim (1849–1937)
Dorsum Higazy	28.0°N 17.0°W	60 km	Riad Higazy (1919–1967)
Dorsa Lister	20.3°N 23.8°E	203 km	Martin Lister (1639–1712)
Dorsa Mawson	7.0°S 53.0°E	132 km	Douglas Mawson (1882–1958)
Dorsum Nicol	18.0°N 23.0°E	50 km	William Nicol (1768–1851)
Dorsum Niggli	29.0°N 52.0°W	50 km	Paul Niggli (1888–1953)
Dorsum Oppel	18.7°N 52.6°E	268 km	Albert Oppel (1831–1865)
Dorsum Owen	25.0°N 11.0°E	50 km	George Owen (1552–1613)
Dorsa Rubey	10.0°S 42.0°W	100 km	William Walden Rubey (1898–1974)
Dorsum Scilla	32.8°N 60.4°W	108 km	Agostino Scilla (1639–1700)
Dorsa Smirnov	27.3°N 25.3°E	156 km	Sergei Sergeevich Smirnov (1895–1947)
Dorsa Sorby	19.0°N 14.0°E	80 km	Henry Clifton Sorby (1826–1908)
Dorsa Stille	27.0°N 19.0°W	80 km	Hans Stille (1876–1966)
Dorsum Termier	11.0°N 58.0°E	90 km	Pierre-Marie Termier (1859–1930)
Dorsa Tetyaev	19.9°N 64.2°E	176 km	Mikhail Mikhailovich Tetyaev (1882–1956)
Dorsum Thera	24.4°N 31.4°W	7 km	Greek feminine name
Dorsum Von Cotta	23.2°N 11.9°E	199 km	Carl Bernard von Cotta (1808–1879)
Dorsa Whiston	29.4°N 56.4°W	85 km	William Whiston (1667–1752)
Dorsum Zirkel	28.1°N 23.5°W	193 km	Ferdinand Zirkel (1838–1912)

=== Promontoria ===
These features form a cape or headland on a mare.

Name	Coordinates	Dia.	Name origin
Promontorium Agarum	14.0°N 66.0°E	70 km	Named from a cape in the Sea of Azov
Promontorium Agassiz	42.0°N 1.8°E	20 km	Jean Louis Rodolphe Agassiz (1807–1873)
Promontorium Archerusia	16.7°N 22.0°E	10 km	Named from a cape on the Black Sea
Promontorium Deville	43.2°N 1.0°E	20 km	Charles Joseph Sainte-Claire Deville (1814–1876)
Promontorium Fresnel	29.0°N 4.7°E	20 km	Augustin Jean Fresnel (1788–1827)
Promontorium Heraclides	40.3°N 33.2°W	50 km	Heraclides Ponticus
Promontorium Kelvin	27.0°S 33.0°W	50 km	William Thomson, 1st Baron Kelvin (1824–1907)
Promontorium Laplace	46.0°N 25.8°W	50 km	Pierre Simon Laplace (1749–1827)
Promontorium Taenarium	19.0°S 8.0°W	70 km	Named from cape in Greece

=== Rimae ===
Rimae (singular rima) are lunar rilles.

Name	Coordinates	Dia.	Name origin
Rima Agatharchides	20.0°S 28.0°W	50 km	Named from nearby crater Agatharchides
Rima Agricola	29.0°N 53.0°W	110 km	Named from nearby Montes Agricola
Rimae Alphonsus	14.0°S 2.0°W	80 km	Within crater Alphonsus
Rimae Apollonius	5.0°N 53.0°E	230 km	Named from nearby crater Apollonius
Rimae Archimedes	26.6°N 4.1°W	169 km	Named from nearby crater Archimedes
Rima Archytas	53.0°S 3.0°E	90 km	Named from nearby crater Archytas
Rima Ariadaeus	6.4°N 14.0°E	250 km	Named from nearby crater Ariadaeus
Rimae Aristarchus	26.9°N 47.5°W	121 km	Named from nearby crater Aristarchus
Rimae Arzachel	18.0°S 2.0°W	50 km	Within crater Arzachel
Rimae Atlas	47.5°N 43.6°E	60 km	Within crater Atlas
Rima Billy	15.0°S 48.0°W	70 km	Named from nearby crater Billy
Rima Birt	21.0°S 9.0°W	50 km	Named from nearby crater Birt
Rimae Bode	10.0°N 4.0°W	70 km	Named from nearby crater Bode
Rimae Boscovich	9.8°N 11.1°E	40 km	Within crater Boscovich
Rima Bradley	23.8°N 1.2°W	161 km	Named from nearby Mons Bradley
Rima Brayley	21.4°N 37.5°W	311 km	Named from nearby crater Brayley
Rima Calippus	37.0°N 13.0°E	40 km	Named from nearby crater Calippus
Rima Cardanus	11.4°N 71.5°E	175 km	Named from nearby crater Cardanus
Rima Carmen	19.8°N 29.3°E	10 km	Spanish feminine name
Rima Cauchy	10.5°N 38.0°E	140 km	Named from nearby crater Cauchy
Rimae Chacornac	29.0°N 32.0°E	120 km	Named from nearby crater Chacornac
Rima Cleomedes	27.0°N 57.0°E	80 km	Within crater Cleomedes
Rima Cleopatra	30.0°N 53.8°W	14 km	Greek feminine name
Rima Conon	18.6°N 2.0°E	30 km	Named from nearby crater Conon
Rimae Daniell	37.0°N 26.0°E	200 km	Named from nearby crater Daniell
Rimae Darwin	19.3°S 69.5°W	143 km	Named from nearby crater Darwin
Rima Dawes	17.5°N 26.6°E	15 km	Named from nearby crater Dawes
Rimae de Gasparis	24.6°S 51.1°W	93 km	Named from nearby crater de Gasparis
Rima Delisle	31.0°N 32.0°W	60 km	Named from nearby crater Delisle
Rima Diophantus	29.0°N 33.0°W	150 km	Named from nearby crater Diophantus
Rimae Doppelmayer	25.9°S 45.1°W	162 km	Named from nearby crater Doppelmayer
Rima Draper	18.0°N 25.0°W	160 km	Named from nearby crater Draper
Rima Euler	21.0°N 31.0°W	90 km	Named from nearby crater Euler
Rima Flammarion	2.8°S 5.6°W	80 km	Named from nearby crater Flammarion
Rimae Focas	28.0°S 98.0°W	100 km	Named from nearby crater Focas
Rimae Fresnel	28.0°N 4.0°E	90 km	Named from nearby Promontorium Fresnel
Rima Furnerius	35.0°S 61.0°E	50 km	Within crater Furnerius
Rima Galilaei	11.9°N 58.5°W	89 km	Named from nearby crater Galilaei
Rima Gärtner	59.0°N 63.0°E	30 km	Within crater Gärtner
Rimae Gassendi	18.0°S 40.0°W	70 km	Within crater Gassendi
Rima Gay-Lussac	13.0°N 22.0°W	40 km	Named from nearby crater Gay-Lussac
Rima G. Bond	33.3°N 35.5°E	168 km	Named from nearby crater G. Bond
Rimae Gerard	46.0°N 84.0°W	100 km	Named from nearby crater Gerard
Rimae Goclenius	8.0°S 43.0°E	240 km	Named from nearby crater Goclenius
Rimae Grimaldi	9.0°N 64.0°W	230 km	Named from nearby crater Grimaldi
Rima Hadley	25.0°N 3.0°E	80 km	Named from nearby Mons Hadley
Rima Hansteen	12.0°S 53.0°W	25 km	Named from nearby crater Hansteen
Rima Hesiodus	30.0°S 20.0°W	256 km	Named from nearby crater Hesiodus
Rima Hyginus	7.4°N 7.8°E	219 km	Named from nearby crater Hyginus
Rimae Hypatia	0.4°S 22.4°E	206 km	Named from nearby crater Hypatia
Rima Jansen	14.5°N 29.0°E	35 km	Named from nearby crater Jansen
Rimae Janssen	45.6°S 40.0°E	114 km	Named from nearby crater Janssen
Rimae Kopff	17.4°S 89.6°W	41 km	Named from nearby crater Kopff
Rima Krieger	29.0°N 45.6°W	22 km	Named from nearby crater Krieger
Rimae Liebig	20.0°S 45.0°W	140 km	Named from nearby crater Liebig
Rimae Littrow	22.1°N 29.9°E	115 km	Named from nearby crater Littrow
Rimae Maclear	13.0°S 20.0°E	110 km	Named from nearby crater Maclear
Rimae Maestlin	2.0°N 40.0°W	80 km	Named from nearby crater Maestlin
Rima Mairan	38.0°N 47.0°W	90 km	Named from nearby crater Mairan
Rima Marcello	18.6°N 27.7°E	2 km	Italian masculine name
Rima Marius	16.5°N 48.9°W	121 km	Named from nearby crater Marius
Rimae Maupertuis	52.0°N 23.0°W	84 km	Named from nearby crater Maupertuis
Rimae Menelaus	17.2°N 17.9°E	131 km	Named from nearby crater Menelaus
Rimae Mersenius	21.5°S 49.2°W	84 km	Named from nearby crater Mersenius
Rima Messier	1.0°S 45.0°E	100 km	Named from nearby crater Messier
Rima Milichius	8.0°N 33.0°W	100 km	Named from nearby crater Milichius
Rimae Opelt	13.0°S 18.0°W	70 km	Named from nearby crater Opelt
Rima Oppolzer	1.7°S 1.0°E	94 km	Named from nearby crater Oppolzer
Rimae Palmieri	28.0°S 47.0°W	150 km	Named from nearby crater Palmieri
Rimae Parry	6.1°S 16.8°W	82 km	Named from nearby crater Parry
Rimae Petavius	25.9°S 58.9°E	80 km	Named from nearby crater Petavius
Rimae Pettit	23.0°S 92.0°W	450 km	Named from nearby crater Pettit
Rimae Pitatus	28.5°S 13.8°W	94 km	Named from nearby crater Pitatus
Rimae Plato	52.9°N 3.2°W	87 km	Named from nearby crater Plato
Rimae Plinius	17.9°N 23.6°E	124 km	Named from nearby crater Plinius
Rimae Posidonius	32.0°N 28.7°E	70 km	Named from nearby crater Posidonius
Rimae Prinz	27.0°N 43.0°W	80 km	Named from nearby crater Prinz
Rimae Ramsden	33.9°S 31.4°W	108 km	Named from nearby crater Ramsden
Rima Réaumur	3.0°S 3.0°E	30 km	Named from nearby crater Réaumur
Rima Reiko	18.6°N 27.7°E	2 km	Japanese feminine name
Rimae Repsold	50.6°N 81.7°W	166 km	Named from crater Repsold, which it crosses
Rimae Riccioli	2.0°N 74.0°W	400 km	Named from nearby crater Riccioli
Rimae Ritter	3.0°N 18.0°W	100 km	Named from nearby crater Ritter
Rimae Römer	27.0°N 35.0°W	110 km	Named from nearby crater Römer
Rima Rudolf	19.6°N 29.6°E	8 km	German masculine name
Rima Schröter	1.0°N 6.0°W	40 km	Named from nearby crater Schröter
Rimae Secchi	1.0°N 44.0°W	35 km	Named from nearby crater Secchi
Rima Sharp	46.7°N 50.5°W	107 km	Named from nearby crater Sharp
Rima Sheepshanks	58.0°N 24.0°E	200 km	Named from nearby crater Sheepshanks
Rima Siegfried	25.9°S 103.0°E	14 km	German masculine name
Rimae Sirsalis	15.7°S 61.7°W	426 km	Named from nearby crater Sirsalis
Rimae Sosigenes	8.6°N 18.7°E	190 km	Named from nearby crater Sosigenes
Rima Suess	6.7°N 48.2°E	165 km	Named from nearby crater Suess
Rimae Sulpicius Gallus	21.0°N 10.0°E	90 km	Named from nearby crater Sulpicius Gallus
Rima Sung-Mei	24.6°N 11.3°E	4 km	Chinese feminine name
Rimae Taruntius	5.5°N 46.5°E	25 km	Named from nearby crater Taruntius
Rimae Theaetetus	33.0°N 6.0°E	50 km	Named from nearby crater Theaetetus
Rima T. Mayer	13.0°N 31.0°W	50 km	Named from nearby crater T. Mayer
Rimae Triesnecker	4.3°N 4.6°E	215 km	Named from nearby crater Triesnecker
Rimae Vasco da Gama	10.0°N 82.0°E	60 km	Named from nearby crater Vasco da Gama
Rima Vladimir	25.2°N 0.7°W	14 km	Slavic masculine name
Rima Wan-Yu	20.0°N 31.5°W	12 km	Chinese feminine name
Rima Yangelʹ	16.7°N 4.6°E	30 km	Named from nearby crater Yangelʹ
Rima Zahia	25.0°N 29.5°W	16 km	Arabic feminine name
Rimae Zupus	15.0°S 53.0°W	120 km	Named from nearby crater Zupus

=== Rupes ===
These are escarpments in the surface.

Name	Coordinates	Dia.	Name origin
Rupes Altai	24.3°S 22.6°E	427.0 km	Altai Mountains
Rupes Boris	30.5°N 33.5°W	4.0 km	Named from nearby crater Boris
Rupes Cauchy	9.0°N 37.0°E	120.0 km	Named from nearby crater Cauchy
Rupes Kelvin	27.3°S 33.1°W	78.0 km	Named from nearby Promontorium Kelvin
Rupes Liebig	25.0°S 46.0°W	180.0 km	Named from nearby crater Liebig
Rupes Mercator	31.0°S 22.3°W	93.0 km	Named from nearby crater Mercator
Rupes Recta	22.1°S 7.8°W	134.0 km	Latin for "straight cliff"
Rupes Toscanelli	27.4°N 47.5°W	70.0 km	Named from nearby crater Toscanelli

=== Terrae ===
The continental areas between the seas were given comparable names by Giovanni Battista Riccioli, but were opposite the names used for the seas. Thus there were the lands of sterility (Terra Sterilitatis), heat (Terra Caloris), and liveliness (Terra Vitae). However these names for the highland regions are no longer used on recent maps, and Terrae are not officially recognized as standard lunar nomenclature by the International Astronomical Union.

Name	Name origin	Near side position
Insula Ventorum	Island of Winds	Around Kepler in the Oceanus Procellarum
Peninsula Fulminum	Peninsula of Thunderbolts	Between Mare Humorum and Oceanus Procellarum.
Terra Caloris	Land of Heat	Southwest rim of the near side.
Terra Fertilitatis	Land of Fertility	Southeastern rim of the near side.
Terra Grandinis	Land of Hail	Northeast border of Mare Imbrium.
Terra Mannae	Land of Manna	Region between Mare Tranquillitatis, Mare Fecunditatis and Mare Nectaris.
Terra Nivium	Land of Snows	Southeast border of Mare Imbrium.
Terra Pruinae	Land of Frost	Northwest border of Mare Imbrium.
Terra Sanitatis	Land of Healthiness	Central region between Mare Nubium and Mare Tranquillitatis.
Terra Siccitatis	Land of Dryness	Northwest rim of the near side.
Terra Sterilitatis	Land of Sterility	Southwest limb beyond the Terra Caloris
Terra Vigoris	Land of Vigor	Region southeast of Mare Crisium.
Terra Vitae	Land of Life	Northeast rim of the near side.

== See also ==
- Lunar craters
- Topography of the Moon
- List of mountain ranges
- List of mountains on the Moon
- List of named features on the Far Side of the Moon
