= List of mountains on the Moon =

Lunar peaks

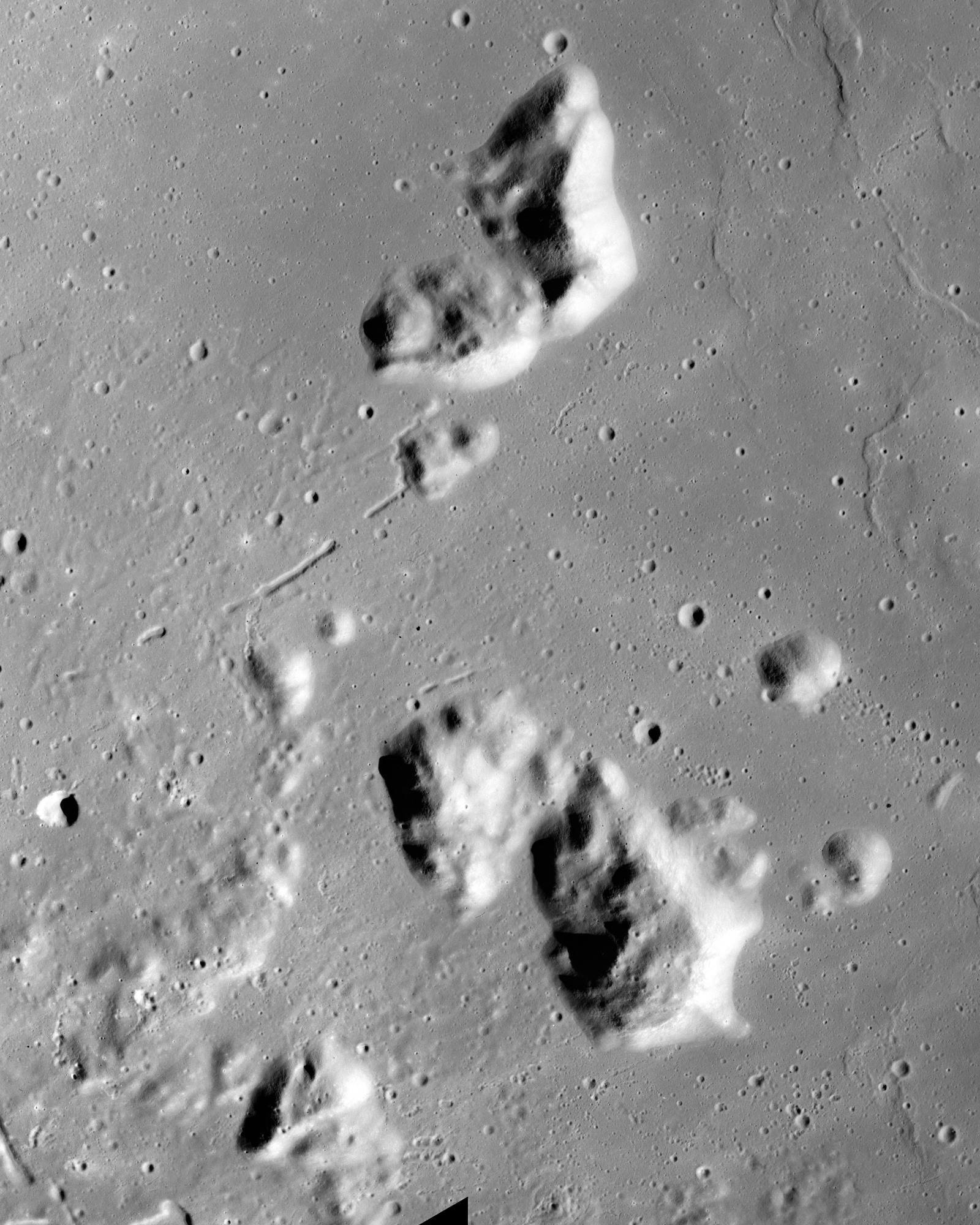
Montes Harbinger

This is a list of mountains on the Moon (with a scope including all named mons and montes, planetary science jargon terms roughly equivalent to 'isolated mountain'/'massif' and 'mountain range').

== Caveats ==
- This list is not comprehensive, as surveying of the Moon is a work in progress.
- Heights are in meters; most peaks have not been surveyed with the precision of a single meter.
- Mountains on the Moon have heights and elevations/altitudes defined relative to various vertical datums (referring to the lunoid), each in turn defined relative to the center of mass (CoM) of the Moon.
  c. 1960 — the U.S. Army Mapping Service datum was established 1,737,988 meters from the CoM.
  c. 1970 — the U.S. Defense Mapping Agency used 1,730,000 meters.
  c. 1990 — The Clementine topographic data use 1,737,400 meters as the baseline, and show a range of about 18,100 meters from lowest to highest point on the Moon.
- This is not a list of the highest places on the Moon, meaning those farthest from the CoM. Rather, it is a list of peaks at various heights relative to the relevant datum. This is because the Moon has mass asymmetries: the highest point, located on the far side of the Moon, is approximately 6,500 meters higher than Mons Huygens (usually listed as the tallest mountain).

== List ==
Peaks on the Moon
Name	Type	Namesake	Peak coordinates	Peak elevation (m)	Topographic prominence (m)
Agnes	mons	Agnes (Greek feminine name, meaning 'lamb')	18.66°N 5.34°E	650 m	30 m
Agricola	montes	Georgius Agricola (metallurgist)	29.06°N 54.07°W		Unknown
Alpes	montes	Alps (Europe)	48.36°N 0.58°W		Unknown
Ampère	mons	André-Marie Ampère (physicist)	19.32°N 3.71°W	3300 m	3000 m
André	mons	André (French masculine name)	5.18°N 120.56°E		Unknown
Apenninus	montes	Apennine Mountains (Italy)	19.87°N 0.03°W		Unknown
Archimedes	montes	Archimedes (crater) nearby	25.39°N 5.25°W		Unknown
Ardeshir	mons	Ardeshir (also 'Ardashir'; Persian King, Persian male name)	5.03°N 121.04°E		Unknown
Argaeus	mons	Mount Erciyes (Asia Minor)	19.33°N 29.01°E		Unknown
Blanc	mons	Mont Blanc (the Alps)	45.41°N 0.44°E	3800 m	3600 m
Bradley	mons	James Bradley (astronomer)	21.73°N 0.38°E	4300 m	4200 m
Carpatus	montes	Carpathian Mountains (Europe)	14.57°N 23.62°W		Unknown
Caucasus	montes	Caucasus Mountains (Europe)	37.52°N 9.93°E		Unknown
Cordillera	montes	cordillera (Spanish for "mountain chain")	17.5°S 79.5°W		Unknown
Delisle	mons	Delisle (crater) nearby	29.42°N 35.79°W		Unknown
Dieter	mons	Dieter (German masculine name)	5.00°N 120.30°E		Unknown
Dilip	mons	Dilip (Indian masculine name)	5.58°N 120.87°E	2000 m	Unknown
Esam	mons	Esam (Arabic masculine name)	14.61°N 35.71°E	6622 m	400 m
Ganau	mons	Ganau (African masculine name)	4.79°N 120.59°E		Unknown
Gruithuisen Delta	mons	Gruithuisen (crater) nearby	36.07°N 39.59°W		Unknown
Gruithuisen Gamma	mons	Gruithuisen (crater) nearby	36.56°N 40.72°W	1500 m	Unknown
Hadley	mons	John Hadley (inventor)	26.69°N 4.12°E	4500 m	4600 m
Hadley Delta	mons	Hadley (quod videm) nearby	25.72°N 3.71°E	3900 m	3500 m
Haemus	montes	Haemus (Greek name for the Balkan Mountains)	17.11°N 12.03°E		Unknown
Hansteen	mons	Hansteen (crater) nearby	12.19°S 50.21°W		Unknown
Harbinger	montes	Harbingers of dawn upon the rim of Aristarchus (crater)	26.89°N 41.29°W		Unknown
Herodotus	mons	Herodotus (crater) nearby	27.50°N 52.94°W		1000 m
Huygens	mons	Christiaan Huygens (astronomer)	19.53°N 2.90°W	3274 m	5300 m
Jura	montes	Jura Mountains (Europe)	47.49°N 36.11°W		Unknown
Kocher	mons	Emil Theodor Kocher (physician)	85.46°S 36.11°W	4000 m	Unknown
la Hire	mons	Philippe de la Hire (astronomer)	27.66°N 118.06°W	1500 m	1500 m
Latreille	mons	Pierre André Latreille (entomologist)	18.47°N 61.92°E		150 m
Maraldi	mons	Maraldi (lunar crater) nearby	20.34°N 35.50°E	1300 m	1300 m
Moro	mons	Antonio Lazzaro Moro (scientist)	11.84°S 19.84°W		Unknown
Mouton	mons	Melba Roy Mouton (mathematician)	84.67°S 39.48°W	7026 m	6030 m
Penck	mons	Albrecht Penck (geographer)	10.0°S 21.74°E		4000 m
Pico	mons	pico (Spanish for "peak")	45.82°N 8.87°W	2400 m	2500 m
Pitón	mons	El Pitón, Spain (summit of Mount Teide, Tenerife)	40.72°N 0.92°W	2100 m	2300 m
Pyrenaeus	montes	Pyrenees Mountains (Europe)	14.05°S 41.51°E		Unknown
Recti	montes	wikt:recti (Latin for "straight range")	48.3°N 19.72°W		Unknown
Riphaeus	montes	wikt:Riphaeus (Greek name for the Ural Mountains, Russia)	7.48°S 27.60°W		Unknown
Rook	montes	Lawrence Rook (astronomer)	20.6°S 82.5°W		Unknown
Rümker	mons	Karl Ludwig Christian Rümker (astronomer)	40.76°N 58.38°W	1100 m	500 m
Secchi	montes	Secchi (lunar crater) nearby	2.72°N 43.17°E		Unknown
Spitzbergen	montes	by resemblance to the Spitsbergen islands (German for "sharp peaks")	34.47°N 5.21°W		Unknown
Taurus	montes	Taurus Mountains (Asia Minor)	27.32°N 40.34°E		Unknown
Teneriffe	montes	Tenerife (island)	47.89°N 13.19°W		Unknown
Usov	mons	Mikhail Usov (geologist)	11.91°N 63.26°E		Unknown
Vinogradov (Note: Formerly called Mons Euler after Leonhard Euler (mathematician).)	mons	Aleksandr Pavlovich Vinogradov (chemist)	22.35°N 32.52°W	1400 m	1400 m
Vitruvius	mons	Vitruvius (crater) nearby	19.33°N 30.74°E	2300 m	2300 m
Wolff	mons	Christian Wolff (philosopher)	16.88°N 6.80°W	3800 m	3500 m

== Gallery ==
The central peaks of the crater Copernicus consist of three isolated mountainous rises climbing as high as 1200 m above the crater floor

Crater Gassendi with central peaks

== See also ==
- List of mountain ranges
- List of features on the Moon
  - Boot Hill
  - Duke Island
- List of craters on the Moon
- List of maria on the Moon
- List of valleys on the Moon
- List of tallest mountains in the Solar System
