= Raman (crater) =

Crater on the Moon

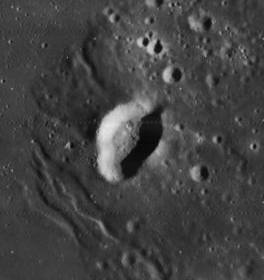
- Lunar Orbiter 4 image
- Coordinates: 27.0°N 55.1°W
- Diameter: 10 km
- Depth: Unknown
- Colongitude: 55° at sunrise
- Eponym: C. V. Raman

Raman is a small lunar impact crater that lies on the western edge of a plateau feature in the expansive lunar mare named Oceanus Procellarum. It shares this plateau with the lava-flooded Herodotus and Aristarchus to the southeastern. To the northeast of Raman is the small peak named Mons Herodotus. To the northwest on the mare is the long, narrow range named the Montes Agricola.

This is an elongated crater formation, with a secondary feature bulging out along the southeast rim. The inner walls of this crater have a higher albedo than the surrounding terrain, which is indicative of a relatively youthful formation. This crater was previously designated Herodotus D, a satellite crater of Herodotus, before being named by the IAU.
