= Mons Ganau =

Mountain on the Moon

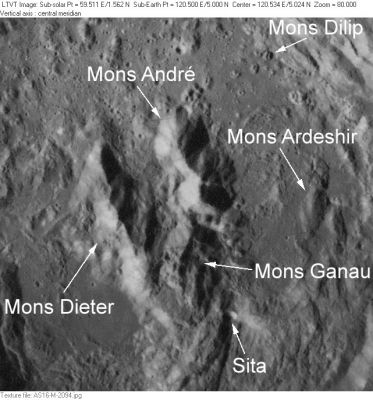

Highest point
- Elevation: 7900 m
- Listing: Lunar mountains
- Coordinates: 4°48′N 120°36′E

Geography
- Location: Near side of the Moon

Geology
- Mountain type: Lunar dome

Mons Ganau is a mountain on the surface of the Moon. It is located inside King Crater, east of Mons Dieter. It has an altitude of about 7900 meters and a diameter of about 13 kilometers. The name, given in 1976, was derived from an African male name.
