= Mons Dilip =

Mountain on the Moon

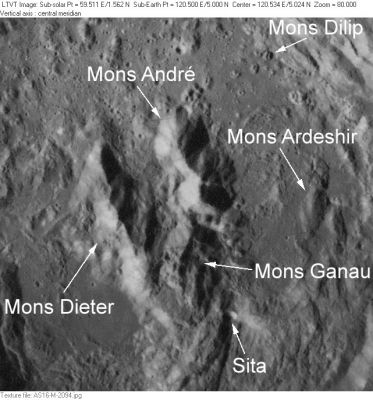

Highest point
- Listing: Lunar mountains
- Coordinates: 5.35°N 120.51°E

Dimensions
- Width: 20 km (12 mi)

Geography
- Location: the Moon

Mons Dilip is a mountain (hill) on the Moon, located in King, an impact crater (along with other peaks Mons André, Mons Ardeshir, Mons Dieter), at 5.35°N 120.51°E. The mountain was named Dilip, an Indian male name, in 1976.
