= Krieger (crater) =

Lunar impact crater

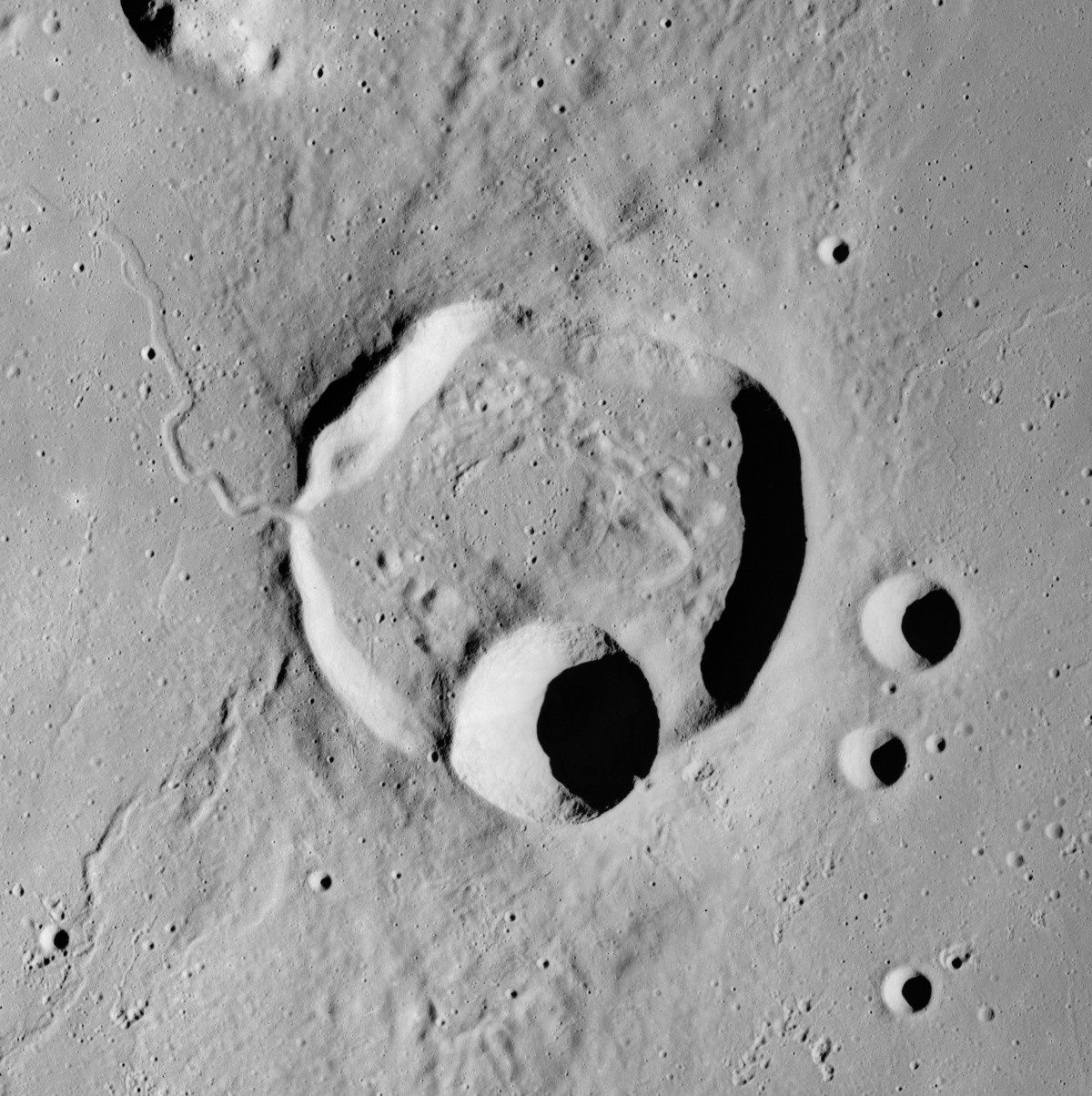
- Apollo 15 image
- Coordinates: 29.02°N 45.61°W
- Diameter: 22.87 km (14.21 mi)
- Depth: 0.95 km
- Colongitude: 46° at sunrise
- Formation: Upper Imbrian
- Eponym: Johann N. Krieger

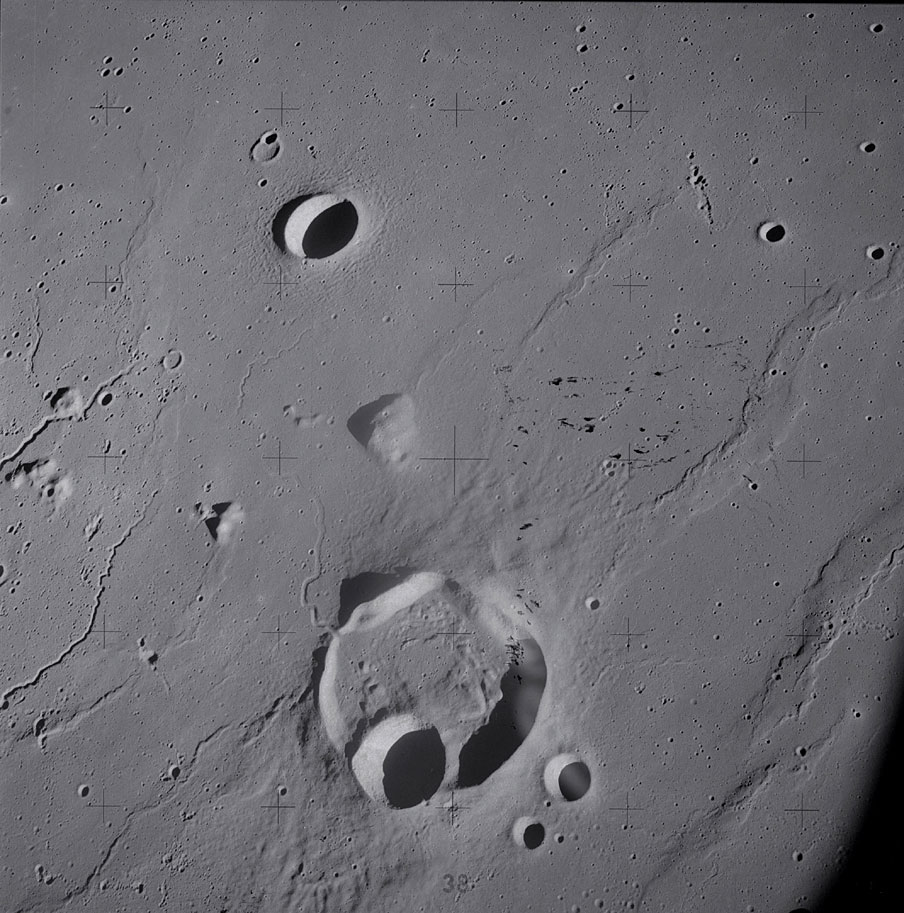
Another Apollo 15 image

Krieger is a lunar impact crater on the eastern part of the Oceanus Procellarum. It is located to the north-northwest of the flooded crater Prinz, and north-northeast of the prominent ray crater Aristarchus. To the northwest lies the small Wollaston. The crater was formally named in 1935.

In the past the floor of Krieger has been flooded by basaltic lava, leaving only a low, circular, somewhat polygonal ridge formed by the rim. The southern rim is broken across by the small Van Biesbroeck, and there is a small gap in the western rim. A meandering rille leads away from this break toward the northwest.

Krieger is a crater of Upper (Late) Imbrian age.

== Nearby craters ==
Two tiny craters next to the eastern rim have been designated Rocco and Ruth. Rocco was previously designated as Krieger D before being named by the IAU.

Crater	Longitude	Latitude	Diameter	Name source
Rocco	28.9° N	45.0° W	5 km	Italian masculine name
Ruth	28.7° N	45.1° W	3 km	Jewish feminine name

The nearby surface to the southwest contains a number of rilles belonging to the Rimae Aristarchus and Rimae Prinz rille systems. Further to the east-southeast are the Montes Harbinger mountains.

== Satellite craters ==
By convention these features are identified on lunar maps by placing the letter on the side of the crater midpoint that is closest to Krieger.

Krieger	Latitude	Longitude	Diameter
C	27.7° N	44.6° W	4 km

The following craters have been renamed by the IAU.

- Krieger B — See Van Biesbroeck (crater).
