= Edward Skinner King =

American astronomer

Edward Skinner King (1861-1931) was an American astronomer.

In 1887 he graduated from Hamilton College and joined the staff of the Harvard Observatory, where he supervised the photographic imaging and related work. He became a pioneer and authority on the process of photographic photometry. In 1912 he noticed that some types of films appeared to perform better during the winter months, which led to the use of the so-called "cold camera" where the temperature is lowered to around -40 °C. From 1926 until his death he was the Phillips Professor of Astronomy at Harvard University.

King developed the algorithm known as the King Tracking Rate, which corrects the tracking rate of a telescope to account for atmospheric refraction.

His reference work "A Manual of Celestial Photography: Principles and Practice for Those Interested In Photographing the Heavens" was published in 1931. This volume was reprinted as recently as 1988.

The crater King on the far side of the Moon is co-named after him and Arthur S. King.
