= Mons Argaeus =

Mountain on the Moon

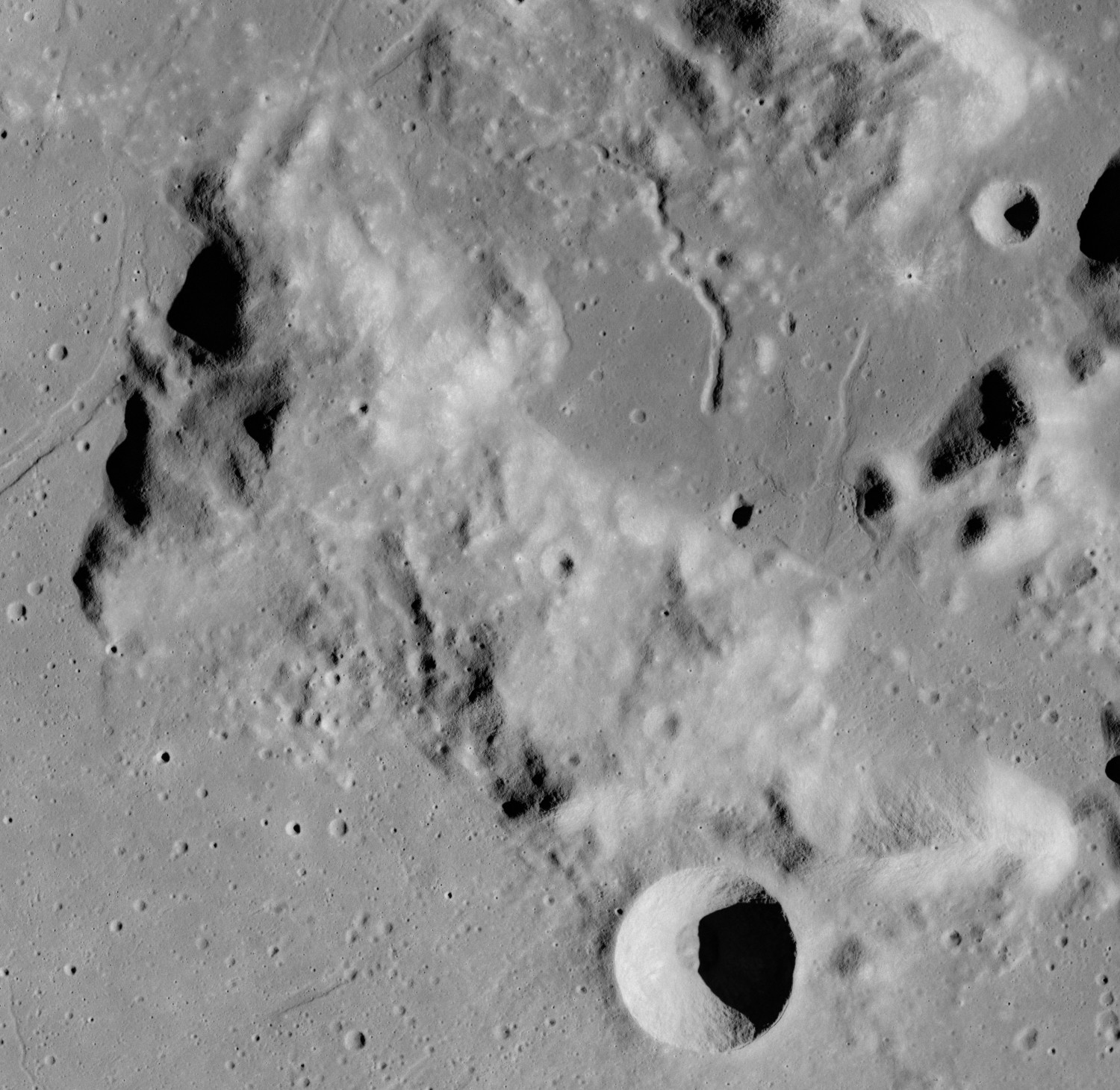
- Apollo 17 image

Highest point
- Elevation: 7060 m (summit)
- Listing: Lunar mountains
- Coordinates: 19.33°N 29.01°E

Geography
- Location: the Moon

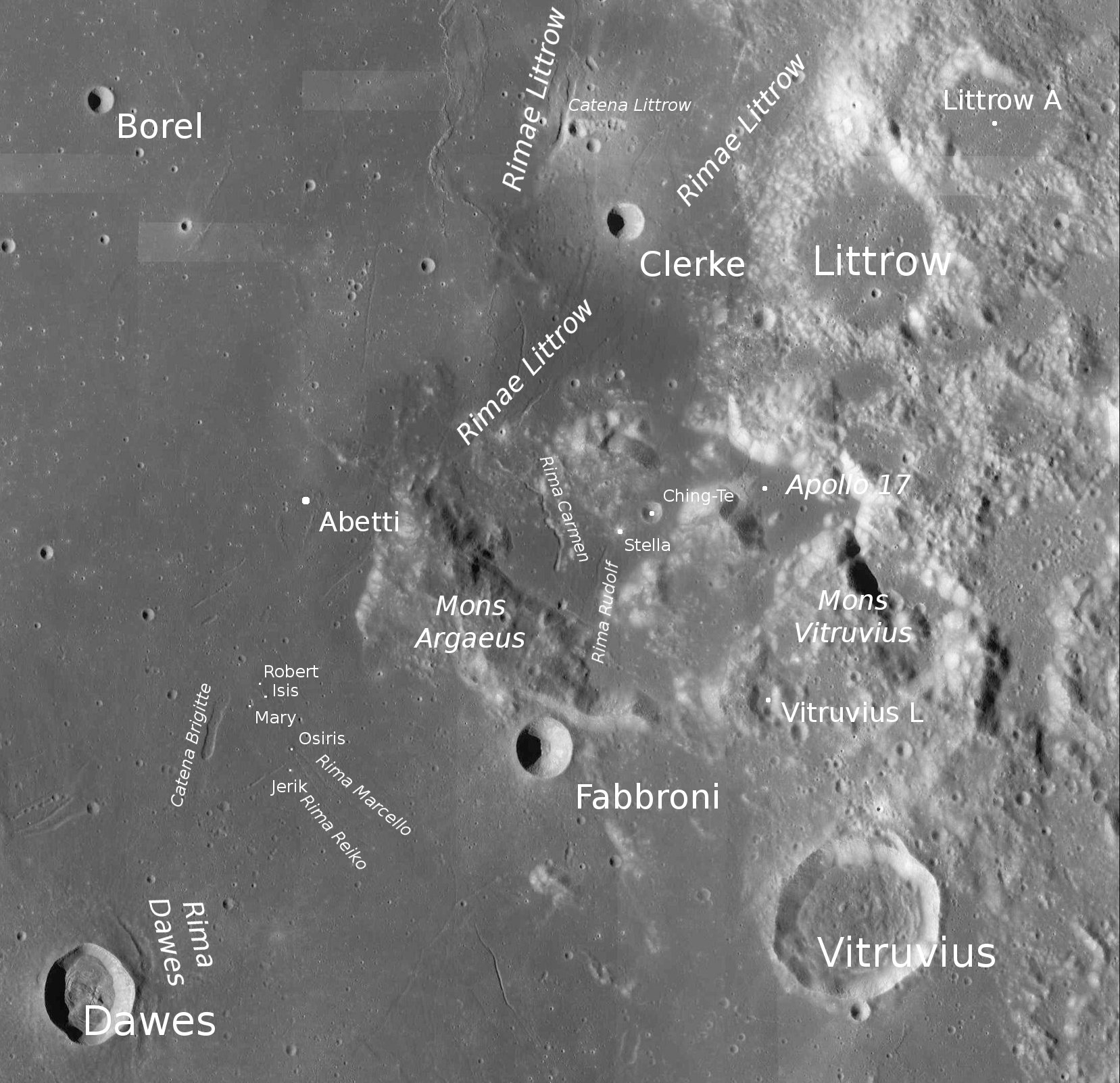
Mons Argaeus is near center

Mons Argaeus is a mountainous massif on the Moon that extends for a length of 65 km towards the southeast. It is located at coordinates 19.33°N 29.01°E, wedging between Mare Serenitatis and Mare Tranquillitatis on their eastern border. The summit is approximately 2560 m above the plain of Mare Serenitatis to the west.

Apollo 17 landed to the east of Mons Argaeus in the Taurus–Littrow Valley (next to Mons Vitruvius and to the south of the crater Littrow).

This rise was given the Latin name for Mount Argaeus, a peak in Turkey now called Erciyes Dağı. The name for this lunar feature was officially adopted by the IAU in 1935.
