= Mons Dieter =

Mountain on the Moon

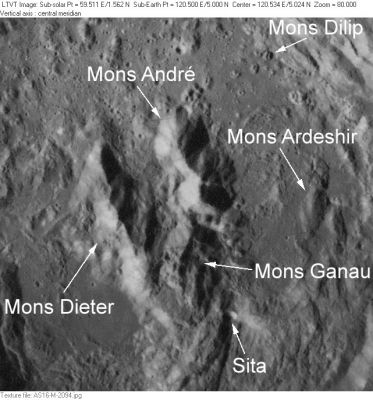

Highest point
- Listing: Lunar mountains
- Coordinates: 5.00°N 120.30°E

Dimensions
- Width: 20 km (12 mi)

Naming
- English translation: Masculine name Dieter
- Language of name: German

Geography
- Location: the Moon

Mons Dieter is a mountain (hill) on the Moon, located in King, an impact crater (along with other peaks Mons André, Mons Ardeshir, Mons Dilip), at 5.00°N 120.30°E. It has a diameter of 20 kilometres (12 mi). The mountain was named Dieter, a German male name, in 1976. The mountain is never visible from the Earth, as it is located on the far side of the Moon.
