= Arthur Scott King =

American physicist and astrophysicist

- King at the Fourth Conference International Union for Cooperation in Solar Research at Mount Wilson Observatory, 1910
- Born: 18 January 1876; Jerseyville, Illinois
- Died: 17 April 1957 (aged 81)
- Education: University of California, Berkeley
- Scientific career
- Fields: Physics, astrophysics
- Workplaces: Mount Wilson Observatory

Arthur Scott King (January 18, 1876 – April 17, 1957) was an American physicist and astrophysicist.

He was born in Jerseyville, Illinois, the son of Robert Andrew and Miriam Munson King. In 1883 the family moved to Santa Rosa, California in an attempt to alleviate their son Arthur's chronic asthma. The asthma cleared up, and in 1890 they moved again to Fresno.

In 1895 Arthur graduated from Fresno High School, then attended the University of California, Berkeley. He developed an interest in physics, and in 1899 he was admitted into their graduate school. He was awarded a Ph.D. in 1903, the first ever Ph.D. in physics awarded by that university.

After winning a Whiting Fellowship, he spent two years in Germany, studying at Bonn and Berlin and travelling in Europe. His academic interests were focused on spectroscopy, and at the time these institutions were leaders in the field.

In 1905 he returned to Berkeley and became an instructor. The following year he married Louise Burnett, and the couple had two sons. The same year he published a paper describing the use of an electric furnace for use in spectroscopy.

He was offered a position at Mt. Wilson Observatory in 1907, and took his leave from Berkeley. He spent much of the remainder of his career studying the spectra of elements and molecules, with particular focus on rare-earth elements. He also performed studies of meteors, including their spectra and directional paths. In 1929, he collaborated with Dr. Raymond T. Birge to discover the isotope Carbon-13, based on differences in the spectrum.

Between 1901 and his retirement he published well over 200 papers in scientific journals. He served as president of the American Meteorical Society for a period, and also as president of the Astronomical Society of the Pacific in 1941. In 1943 he retired, but he became involved in war research at Caltech. There he studied the ballistics of torpedoes launched from aircraft. Finally in 1957, with his health failing, he died in Pasadena, California.

The crater King on the far side of the Moon was co-named for him and Edward S. King.
