= Mons Herodotus =

Mountain on the Moon

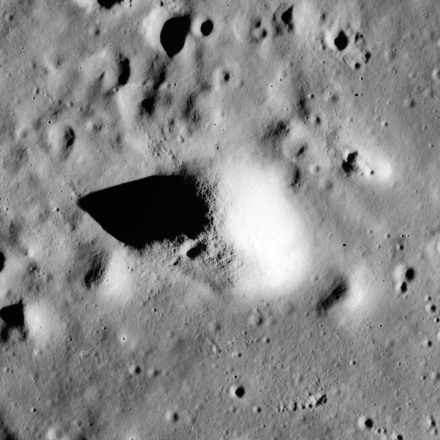
- Apollo 15 image

Highest point
- Elevation: 6995 m (summit)
- Listing: Lunar mountains
- Coordinates: 27.5°N 52.9°W

Naming
- Language of name: Latin

Geography
- Location: the Moon

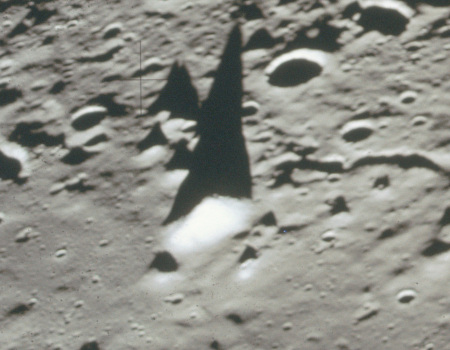
Oblique view also from Apollo 15

Mons Herodotus is a small lunar mountain north of the crater Herodotus. With a length of 6.5 km, it lies on the rugged Aristarchus Plateau and rises approximately 900 m above the surrounding pyroclastic blanket. Originally, it was interpreted as part of the ejecta from the Imbrium formation. However, it may instead be an extruded volcano cone.

During full moon, mons Herodotus shows itself as a starlike white dot in the northwestern section of the mustard colored Wood's Spot, on the Aristarchus plateau. The starlike appearance of Mons Herodotus is also noticeable on the photographic version of chart LAC 38 (page 76) in the Clementine Atlas of the Moon (Ben Bussey / Paul D. Spudis).
