= Mons Usov =

Mountain on the Moon

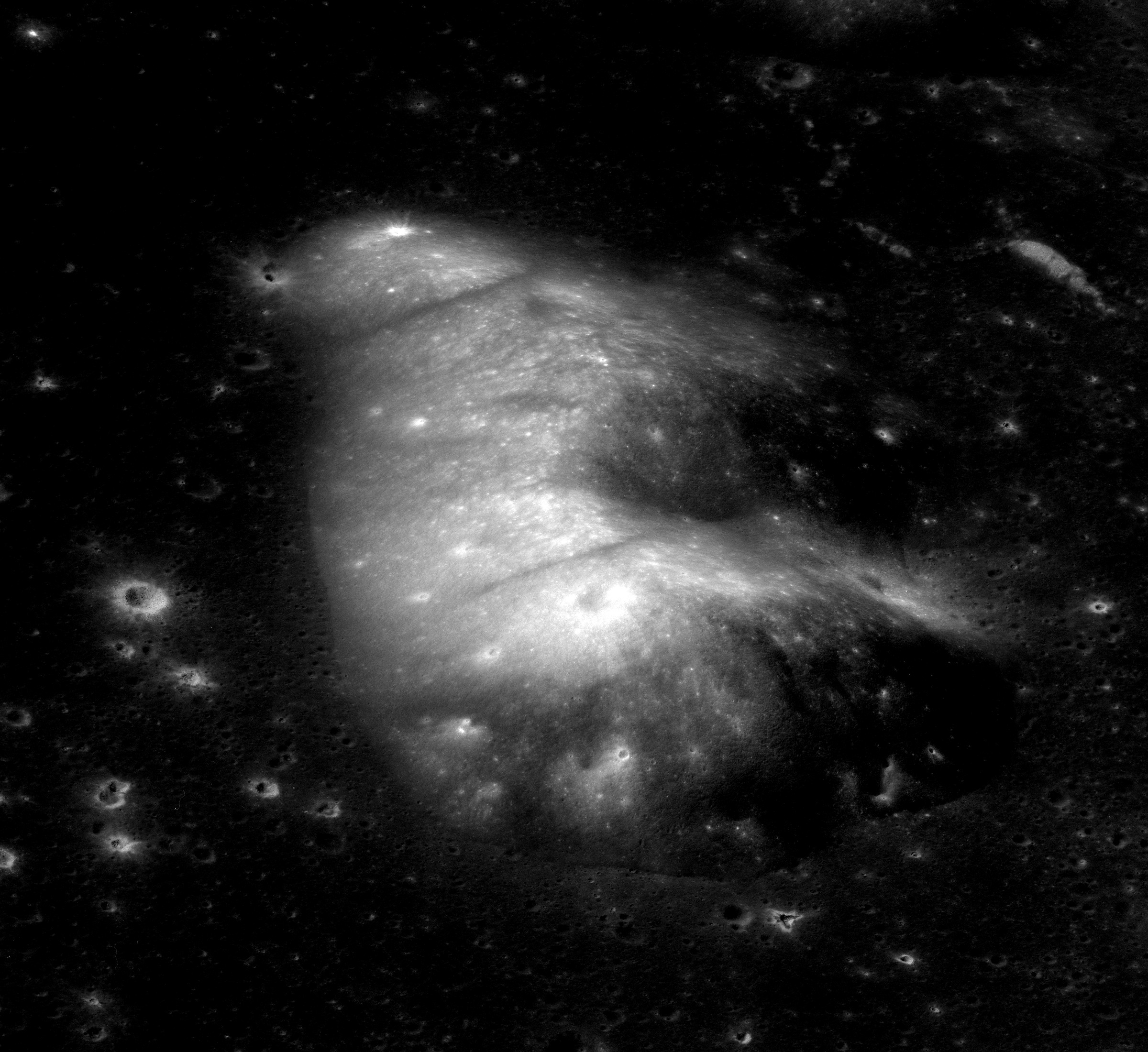
- Oblique Apollo 17 image, facing south

Highest point
- Listing: Lunar mountains
- Coordinates: 11.91°N 63.26°E

Geography
- Location: the Moon

Mons Usov is a small lunar mountain that is located in the southeastern part of the Mare Crisium, to the north of the crater Firmicus, west of Concorcet crater, and northwest of Promontorium Agarum. It is essentially a part of the mountainous rim of the Crisium basin but appears somewhat isolated because of flooding of the basin by mare basalt.

It was formally named in 1979, after Soviet geologist Mikhail Antonovich Usov.

== See also ==
- List of mountains on the Moon
