= Mons Moro =

Mountain on the Moon

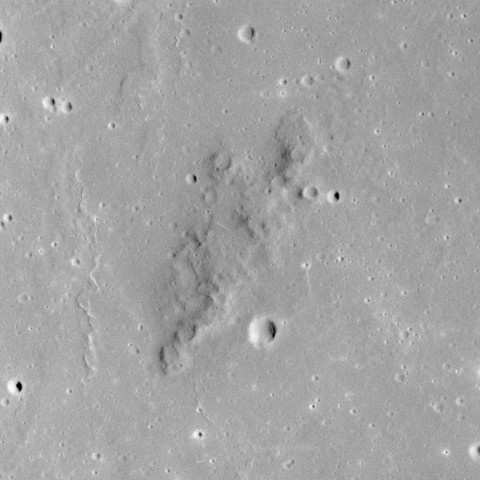
- Apollo 16 Mapping camera image

Highest point
- Listing: Lunar mountains
- Coordinates: 11.84°S 19.84°W

Naming
- Etymology: Anton Lazzaro Moro
- English translation: Moro Mountain
- Language of name: Latin

Geography
- Location: the Moon

Mons Moro is a mountain on the near side of the Moon, within Mare Cognitum, and southwest of the crater Bonpland. The name of the feature was approved by the IAU in 1976, and refers to Italian geologist Anton Lazzaro Moro.

The selenographic coordinates of this peak are 11.84° S, 19.84° W. It is linear and approximately 13 km long, and it has a lower albedo than the surrounding mare. This feature is described in Apollo Over the Moon: A View from Orbit, Figure 92:

Without further detailed study, two explanations for its origin seem equally plausible. The complex may be a densely cratered block of terrae that was partly inundated by the lavas of Mare Cognitum and subsequently blanketed by dark volcanic ejecta. Within the darkened area, the concentration of fresh young craters is less than the surrounding mare surface, strongly suggesting that the dark blanketing was deposited appreciably later than the mare lavas. Alternatively, the complex may be a pile of lava flows densely pockmarked by volcanic craters, and, as in the first case, subsequently covered by volcanic ejecta. The steplike, but discontinuous ledges along the east side of the complex probably represent successive flows of viscous lava. All the craters are shallow, probably because they have been filled by their own ejecta or by that from nearby craters. Nevertheless, several craters have steep raised rims, distinguishing them from impact craters.

== Mons Moro during full moon ==
Experienced telescopic observers of the full moon are aware of the dark presence of Mons Moro in the southeastern part of Mare Cognitum. The very low albedo value of this oblong hilly mountain is obvious. Its darkness is also noticeable on the photographic version of chart LAC 76 (page 152) in The Clementine Atlas of the Moon.
