= Montes Agricola =

Mountain range on the Moon

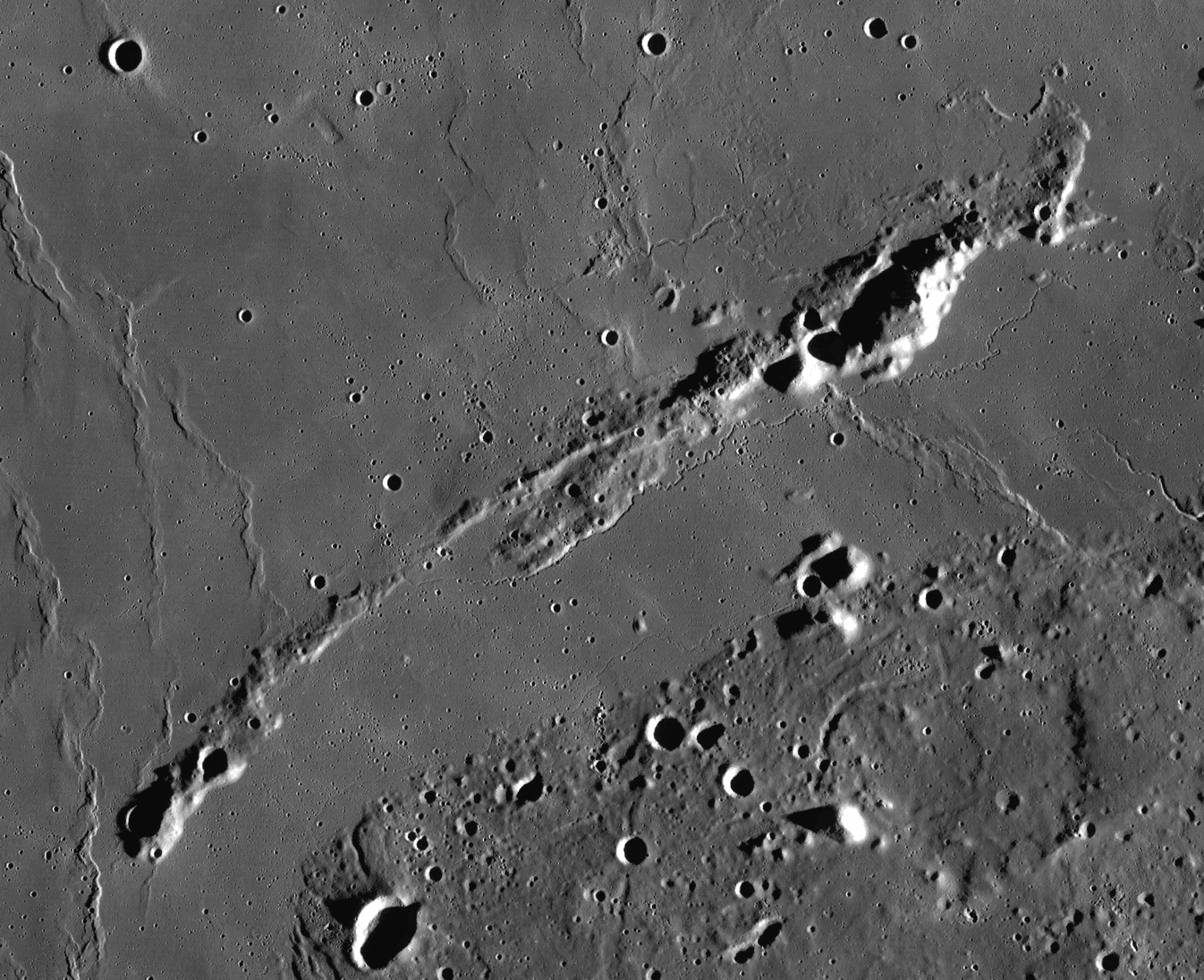
- Lunar Reconnaissance Orbiter image

Highest point
- Listing: Lunar mountains
- Coordinates: 29.06°N 54.07°W

Geography
- Location: the Moon

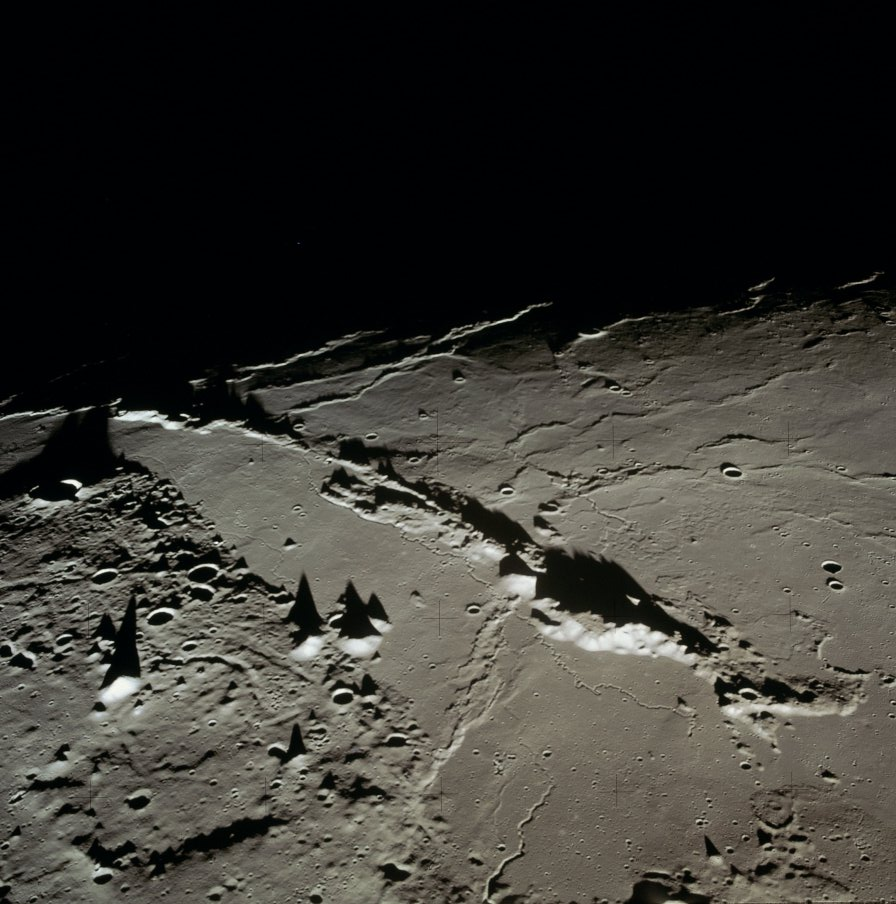
Oblique view from Apollo 15

Montes Agricola is an elongated range of mountains near the eastern edge of the central Oceanus Procellarum lunar mare. It lies just to the northwest of a plateau containing the craters Herodotus and Aristarchus.

The selenographic coordinates of this range are 29.06°N 54.07°W. It continues for a distance of 160 kilometres. This range is a long, slender ridge formation that is more rugged at the northeastern end. There is also a rise at the southwest terminus of the range. The faint trace of a ray parallels the range just to the north. The 20 km gap between this range and the plateau to the south is covered by a flow of basaltic lava. There is a small wrinkle ridge near the northern part that is identified as Dorsum Niggli.

This range is named after Georgius Agricola.
