= Prinz (crater) =

Crater on the Moon

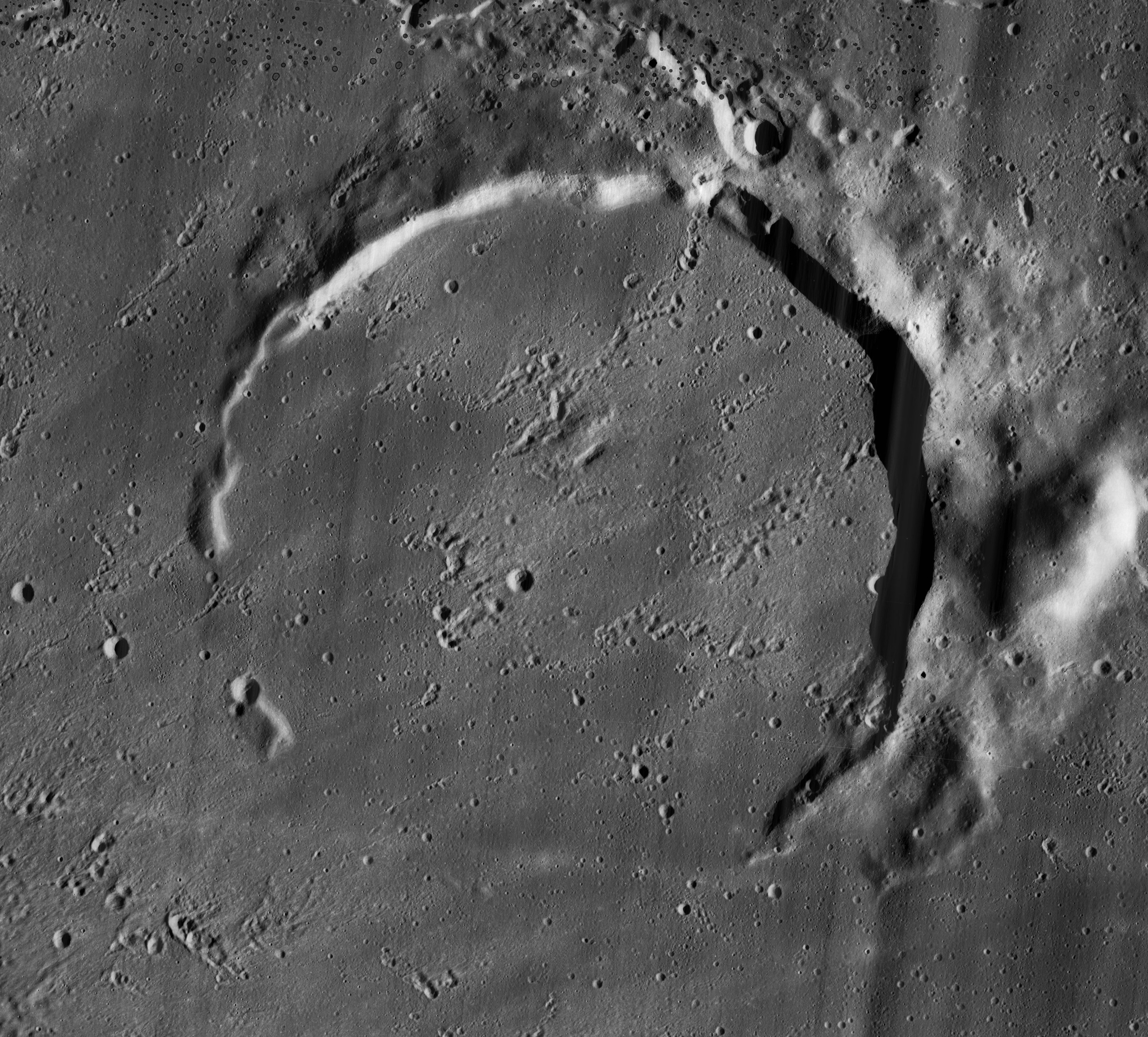
- Lunar Orbiter 5 image
- Coordinates: 25.5°N 44.1°W
- Diameter: 46 km
- Colongitude: 44° at sunrise
- Eponym: Wilhelm Prinz

Prinz is the lava-flooded remains of a lunar impact crater on the Oceanus Procellarum. It was named after German-Belgian astronomer Wilhelm Prinz. The formation lies to the southwest of the prominent crater Aristarchus. To the north-northeast is the flooded crater Krieger.

The rim of Prinz is the most intact in its northeastern half, while a large gap exists in the southern end of the crater wall. The rim climbs to a maximum height of 1.0 km above the base. It is attached along the eastern rim by a low ridge that is part of the foothills of the small Montes Harbinger range to the northeast. The region of the mare about Prinz is marked by rays and secondary craters from Aristarchus.

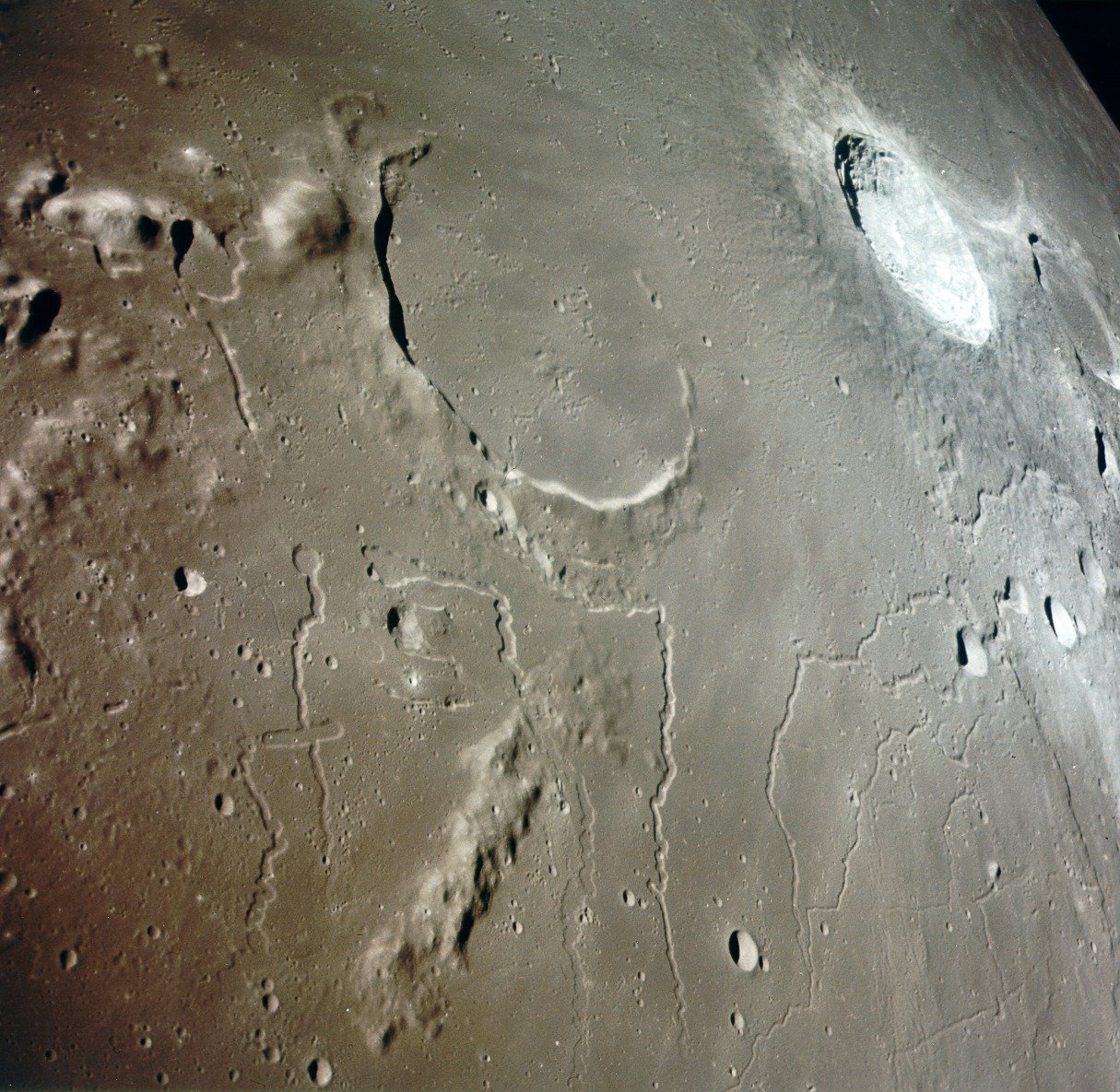
View to southwest of craters Prinz (center top) and Aristarchus (upper right) from Apollo 15.

Northern rim of Prinz crater down to an oblique, close-up view of Vera crater and the associated rille, Rima Prinz.

== Rimae Prinz ==
Just to the north of Prinz is a system of rilles designated the Rimae Prinz. These are sinuous in nature and extend for up to 80 kilometers. The tiny crater Vera is only a couple of kilometers to the north of Prinz's rim, and serves as the origin of one of these rilles. Within the same rille complex is the tiny crater Ivan. The crater Vera was previously identified as Prinz A, and Ivan as Prinz B, before they were assigned names by the IAU.

Crater	Longitude	Latitude	Diameter	Name source
Ivan	26.9° N	43.3° W	4 km	Russian masculine name
Vera	26.3° N	43.7° W	2 km	Latin feminine name

To the northwest is another distinct rille system designated Rimae Aristarchus.
