= Mons Delisle =

Mountain on the Moon

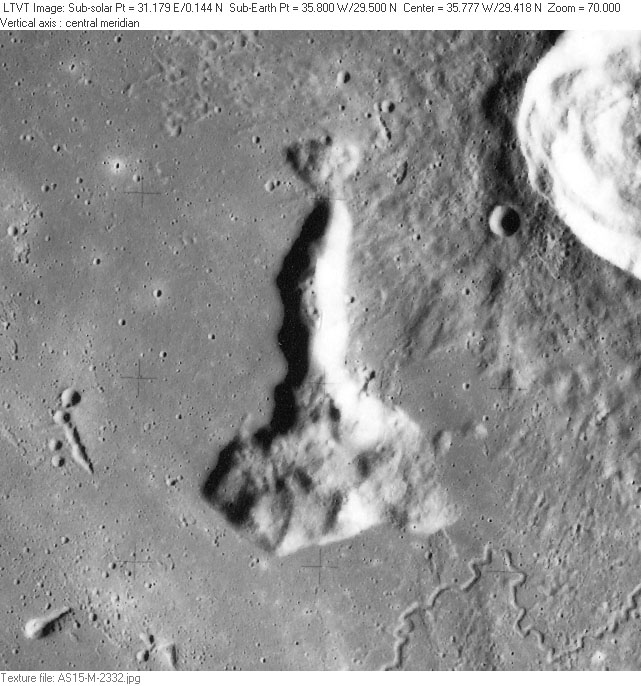
- Aerial photo of Mons Delisle taken during Apollo 15.

Highest point
- Listing: Lunar mountains
- Coordinates: 29.5°N 35.8°W

Geography
- Location: the Moon

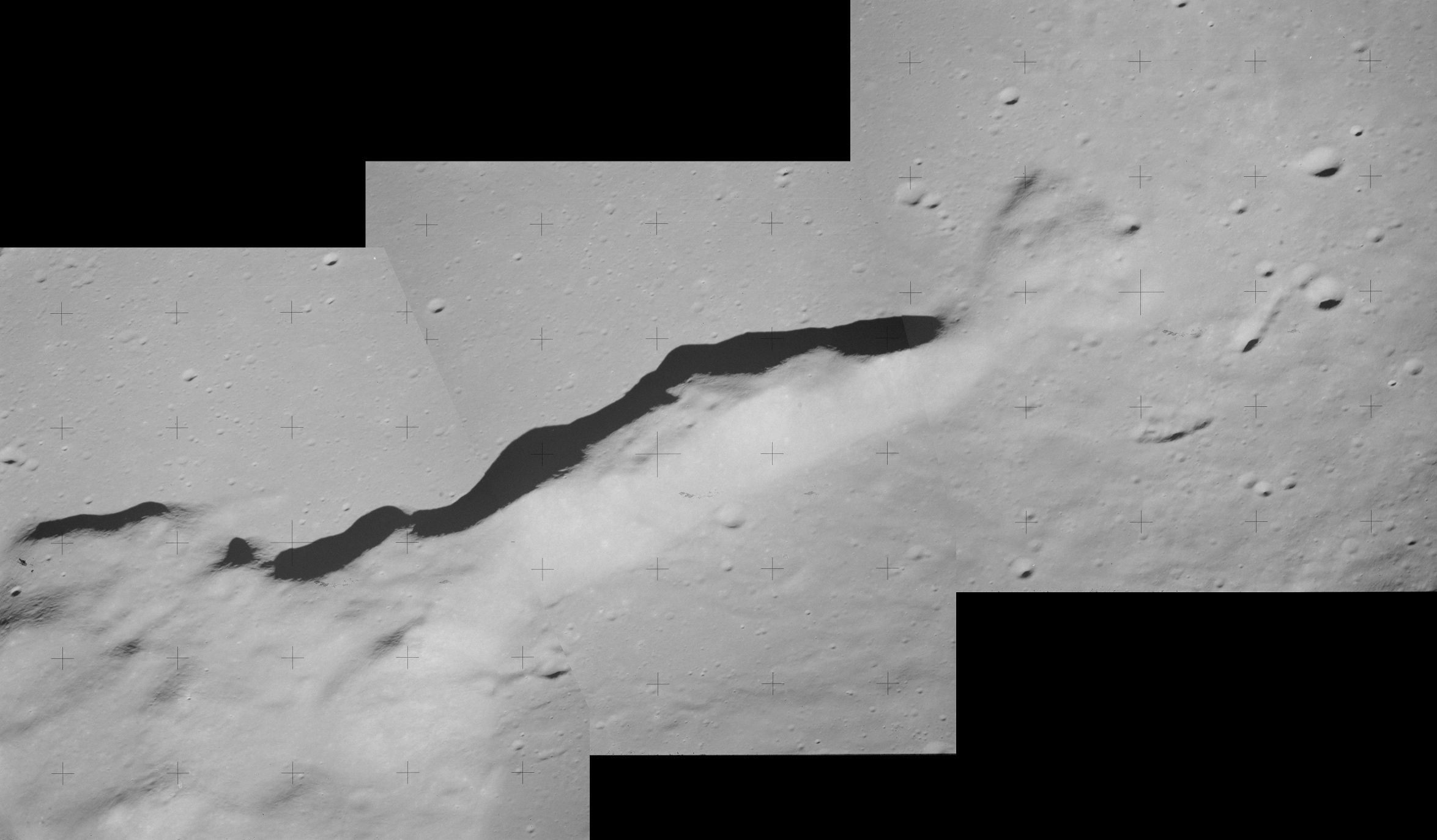
Mosaic showing part of Mons Delisle, from Apollo 15

Mons Delisle is a mountain on the Moon, located on the edge of Mare Imbrium west of the crater Delisle. It is elongated in shape and is about 30 kilometres (19 mi) long. The mountain was named after the nearby crater of the same name by the IAU in 1985.
