= Rimae Atlas =

Rille on the Moon

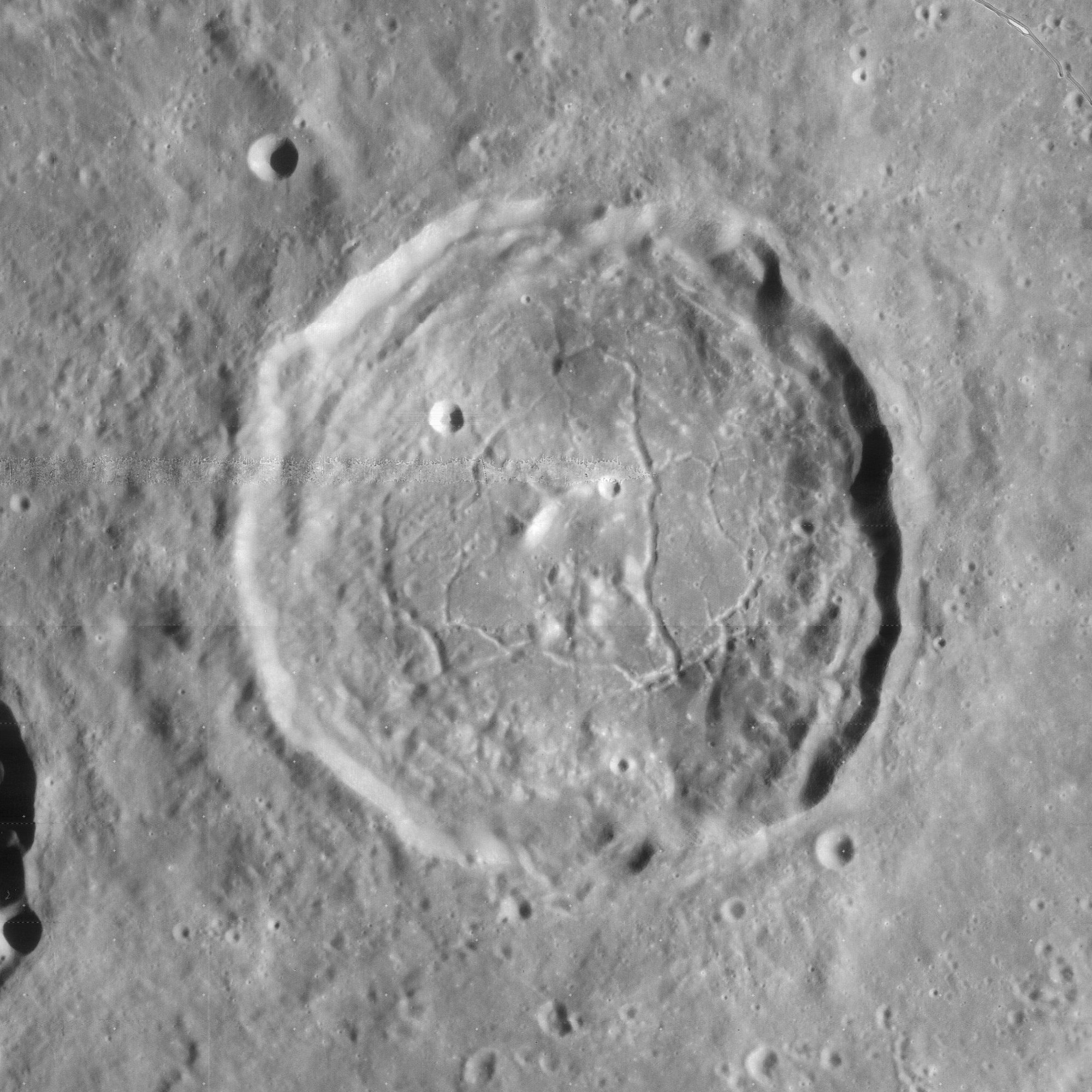
- The crater, Atlas, location of the rimae
- Feature type: Rilles
- Location: Atlas, The Moon
- Coordinates: 46.82°N 44.42°E
- Length: 60 km (37 mi)
- Diameter: 46.8 km (29.1 mi)
- Naming: 1964
- Eponym: Atlas, in Greek mythology

Rimae Atlas are rilles on the crater of Atlas, on the Moon. The naming of the rilles were derived from the Atlas crater that was named after Atlas, the eponymous Titan in Greek mythology. The name "Rimae Atlas" was officially approved by the International Astronomical Union (IAU) in 1964.

== Geology and characteristics ==
The rilles are located at 46.82°N 44.42°E, has a diameter of 46.8 kilometres (29.1 mi), is 60 kilometres (37 mi) long, and is separated into eight parts.

Atlas	Coordinates	Diameter	
Atlas	Coordinates	km	mi
A	45.3°N 49.6°E	22	14
D	50.4°N 49.6°E	25	16
E	48.6°N 42.5°E	58	36
G	50.7°N 46.5°E	23	14
L	51.3°N 48.6°E	6	3.7
P	49.6°N 52.7°E	27	17
W	44.4°N 44.2°E	4	2.5
X	45.1°N 45°E	5	3.1

== Exploration ==
Rimae Atlas was supposed to be the landing place of the Hakuto-R Mission 1 by ispace, that launched on 11 December 2022. Separating from the rocket 47 minutes later at a distance approximately 970 kilometres (600 mi) from Earth, it crashed on 16:40 UTC (00:40 JST) on 25 April 2023.
