= Mikhail Usov =

Mikhail Antonovich Usov
- Михаи́л Анто́нович У́сов
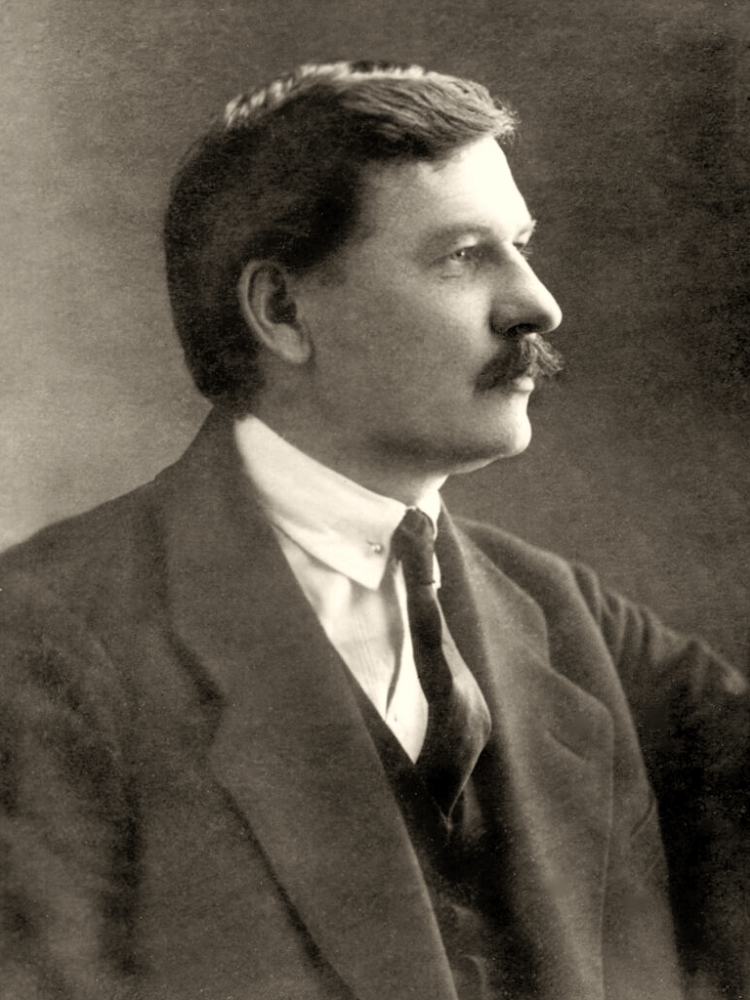
- Portrait on Usov's tombstone in Tomsk
- Born: 20th February 1883; Kainsk, Tomsk Governorate, Russian Empire
- Died: 26th July, 1939; Belokurikha, Altai Krai, Russian SFSR

Mikhail Antonovich Usov (Russian: Михаил Антонович Усов; February 20, 1883 in Kainsk (now Kuybyshev), Tomsk Governorate – July 26, 1939 in Belokurikha, Altai Krai) was a Russian and Soviet geologist and member of the Academy of Sciences of the USSR. He was the first native of Siberia to be elected.

He completed his studies at Tomsk Technological Institute (now Tomsk Polytechnic University) under Vladimir Obruchev and later served on the school's faculty.

Usov studied the geology of Siberia as well as adjacent regions in China and Mongolia and the gold producing regions of Kuznetsk Alatau and Transbaikal.

His most significant contributions to Russia were in his studies of the geological structure of the Kuznetsk Basin. His work enabled an evaluation of the coal reserves in the region and the prospects for developing industry around the coal.

Usov Street in Tomsk, where the Geology Department of Tomsk Polytechnic University is located, is named after him. A small mountain, Mons Usov, in Mare Crisium on the moon is also named after him.
