= King (crater) =

Lunar impact crater

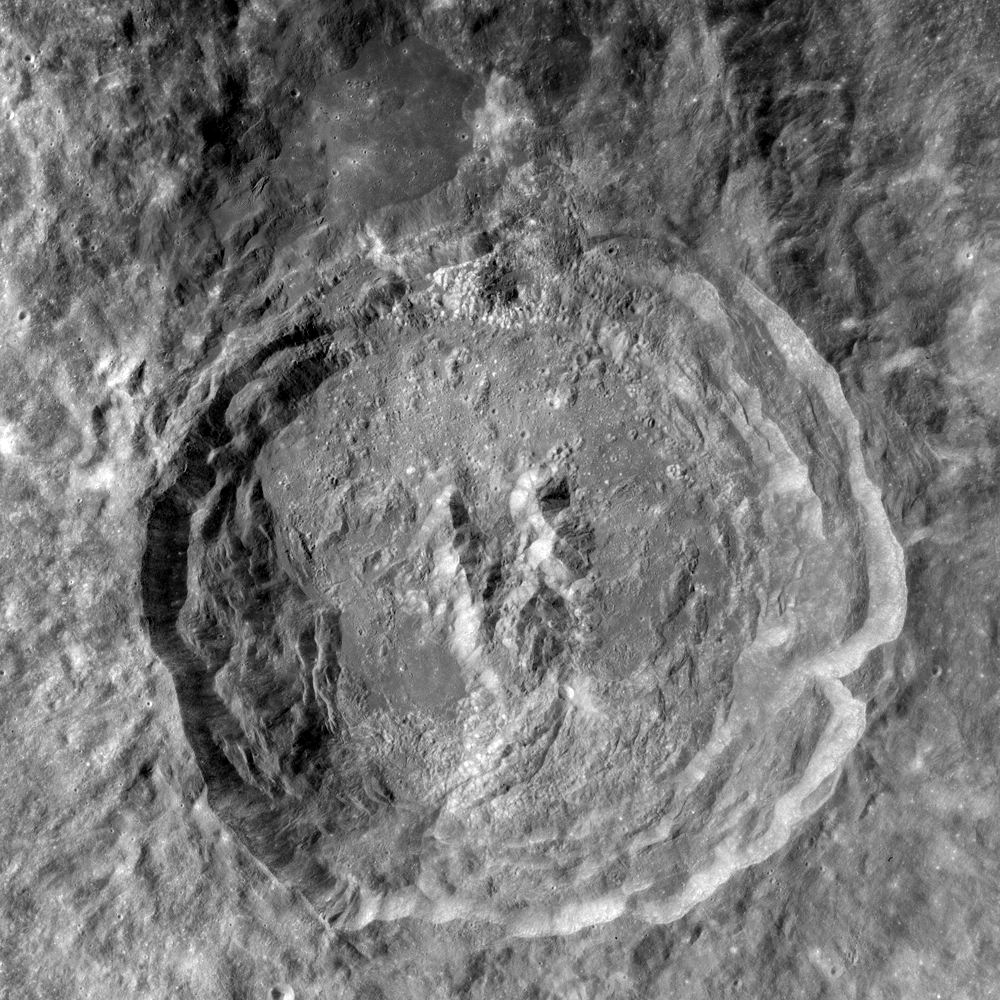
- The lunar crater King from Apollo 16. NASA photo.
- Coordinates: 5.0°N 120.5°E
- Diameter: 76 km
- Depth: 4.15
- Colongitude: 241° at sunrise
- Formation: Copernican
- Eponym: Arthur S. King and Edward S. King

King is a prominent lunar impact crater that is located on the far side of the Moon, and cannot be viewed directly from Earth. The crater was named after Arthur Scott King and Edward Skinner King in 1970. Prior to that, this crater was known as Crater 211. It forms a pair with Ibn Firnas, which is only slightly larger and is attached to the northeast rim of King. To the northwest is the crater Lobachevskiy, and Guyot is located an equal distance to the north-northwest.

Due to its prominent rays, King is mapped as part of the Copernican System on the lunar geologic timescale. The outer rim of King is roughly circular but with a slightly irregular appearance, particularly at the northern end. The crater displays little appearance of wear. The inner walls are terraced, particularly along the eastern side. Within the walls is a somewhat uneven interior floor. The interior is irregular and ridged, particularly in the eastern half. The elongated, Y-shaped central rise is part of a ridge that runs to the southern rim.

The spectra of the central peak fits an olivine-bearing gabbro mineralogy, which originated from a depth of 7.6 to 11.9 km. The infrared spectrum of pure crystalline plagioclase has been identified on the central floor.

== Satellite craters ==
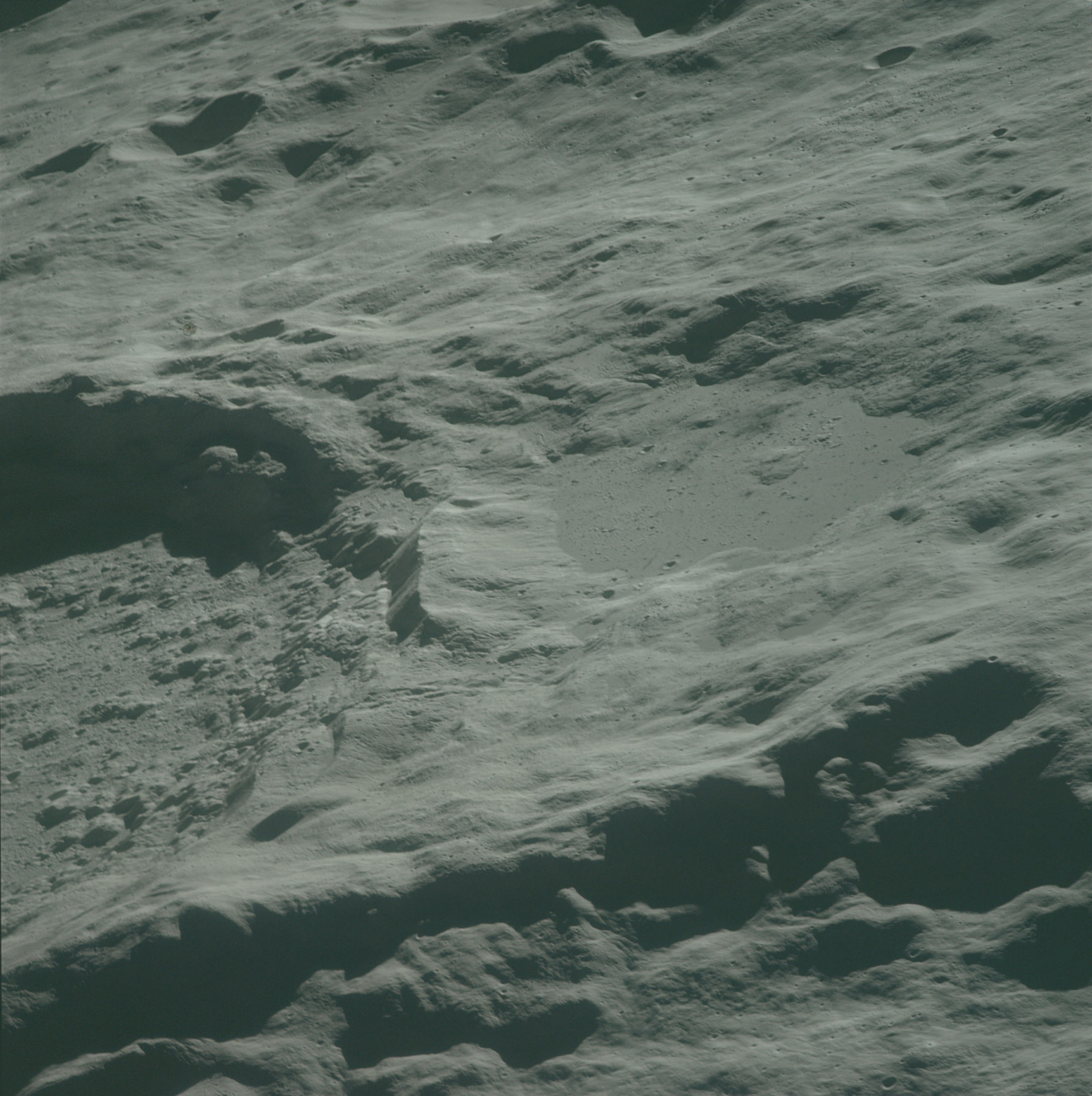
Oblique view of King Y (the "pool") north of King, from Apollo 16

By convention these features are identified on lunar maps by placing the letter on the side of the crater midpoint that is closest to King.

King	Latitude	Longitude	Diameter
J	3.2° N	121.8° E	14 km
Y	6.5° N	119.8° E	48 km

King Y is to the north of King, and it is now a "pool" of impact melt, filled at the time of the King impact. The name "Al-Tusi" had been suggested for King Y, but this was not approved by the IAU. King J is a small crater to the southeast of King, and it is covered by King's ejecta blanket.

=== Sita crater ===
A tiny crater near the east-southeastern inner wall has been officially given the Indian feminine name Sita by the IAU. It is located at selenographic coordinates 4.6° N, 120.8° E, and has a diameter of 2 kilometres.

== Mountain Peaks ==
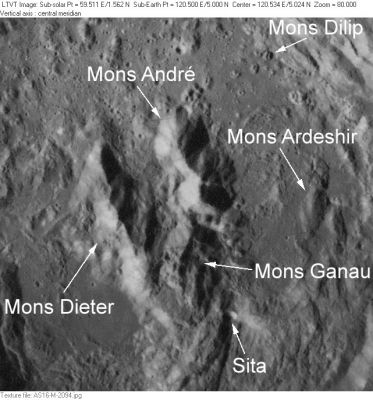

Several mountain peaks (Montes) within King crater have been named. The names were approved by the IAU in 1976.

Mons	Latitude	Longitude	Approximate Altitude
André	5.18° N	120.56° E	7000 m
Ardeshir	5.03° N	121.04° E	5900 m
Dieter	5.00° N	120.30° E	8000 m
Dilip	5.58° N	120.87° E	5500 m
Ganau	4.79° N	120.59° E	7900 m

== Views ==
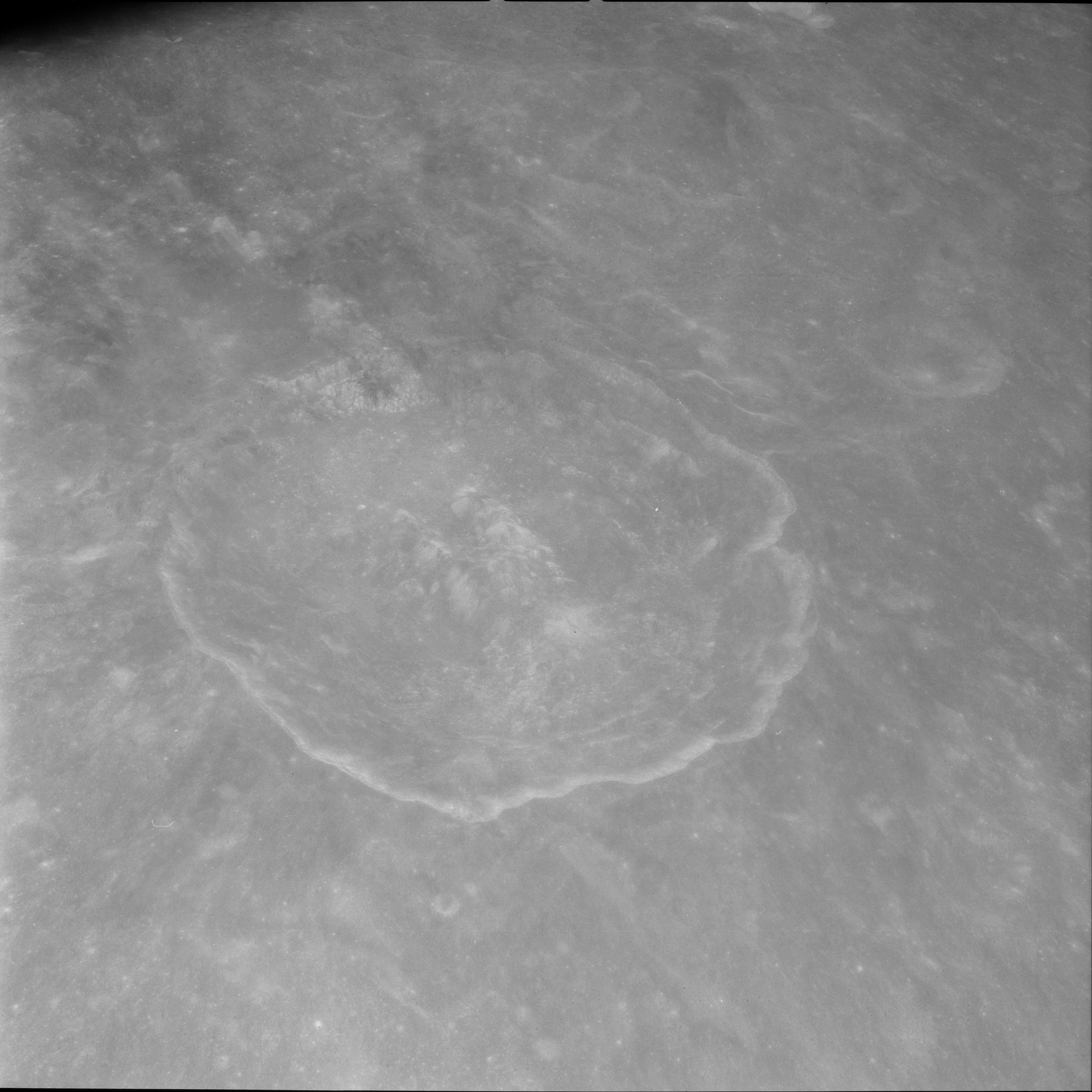
Oblique view from Apollo 11, at a high sun angle, showing albedo differences

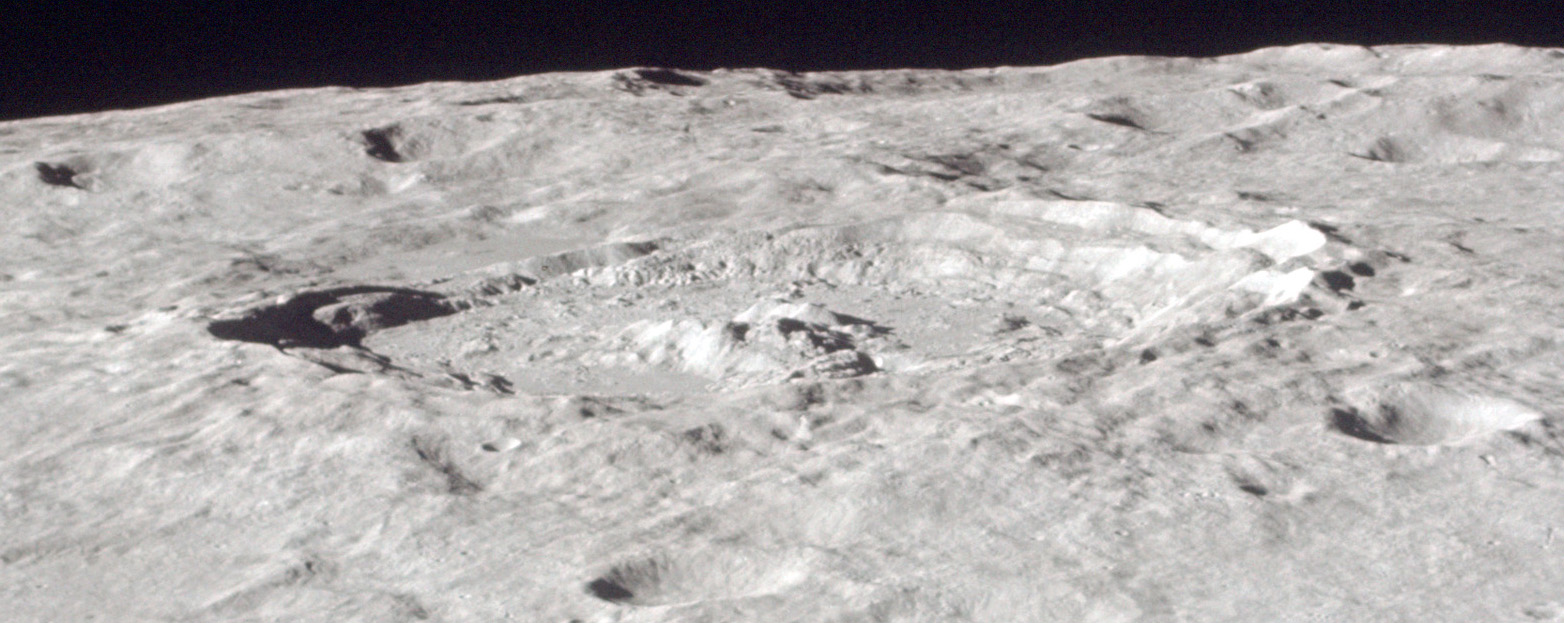
Oblique view from Apollo 12

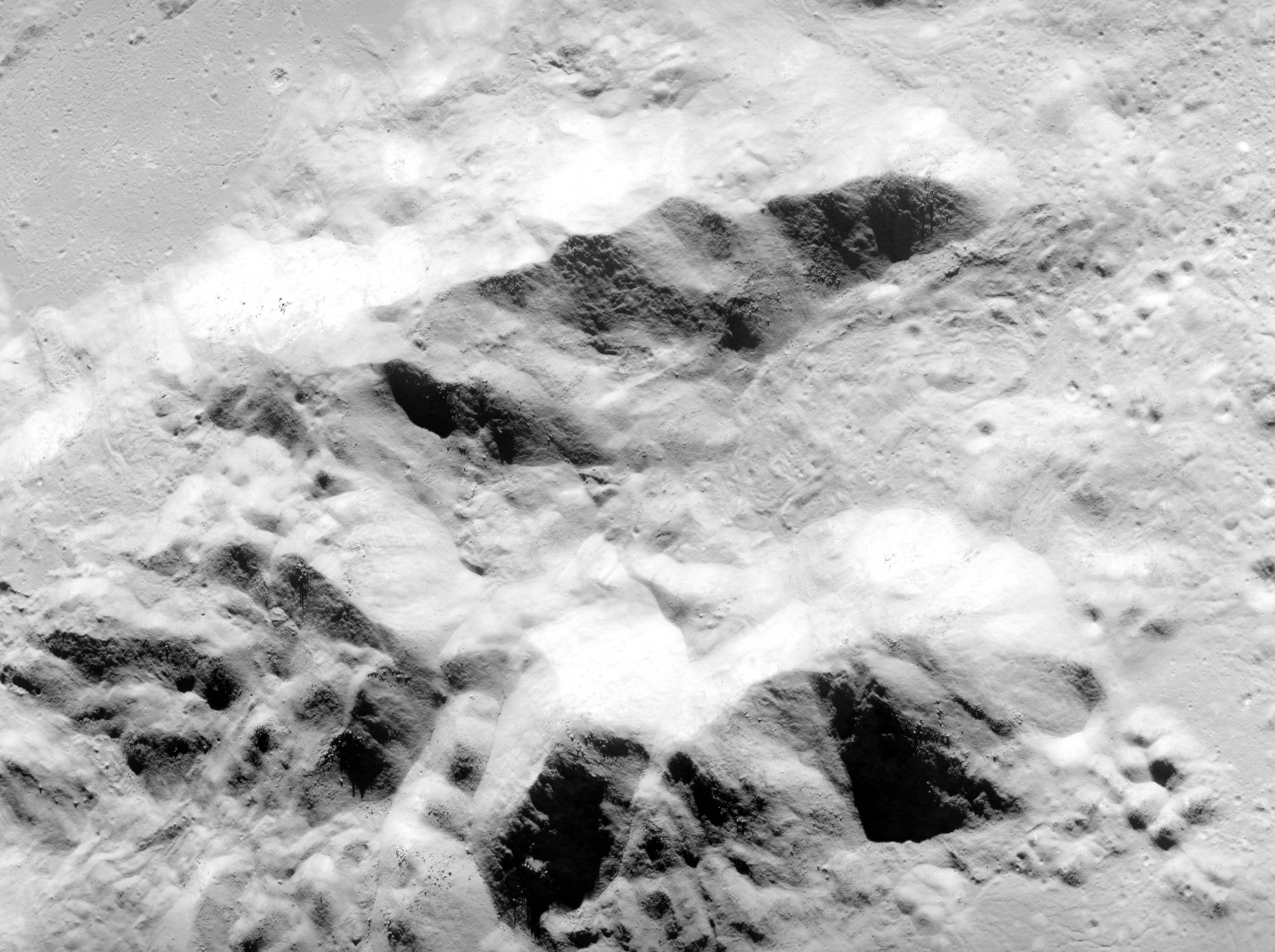
Closeup of the central peaks from Apollo 16

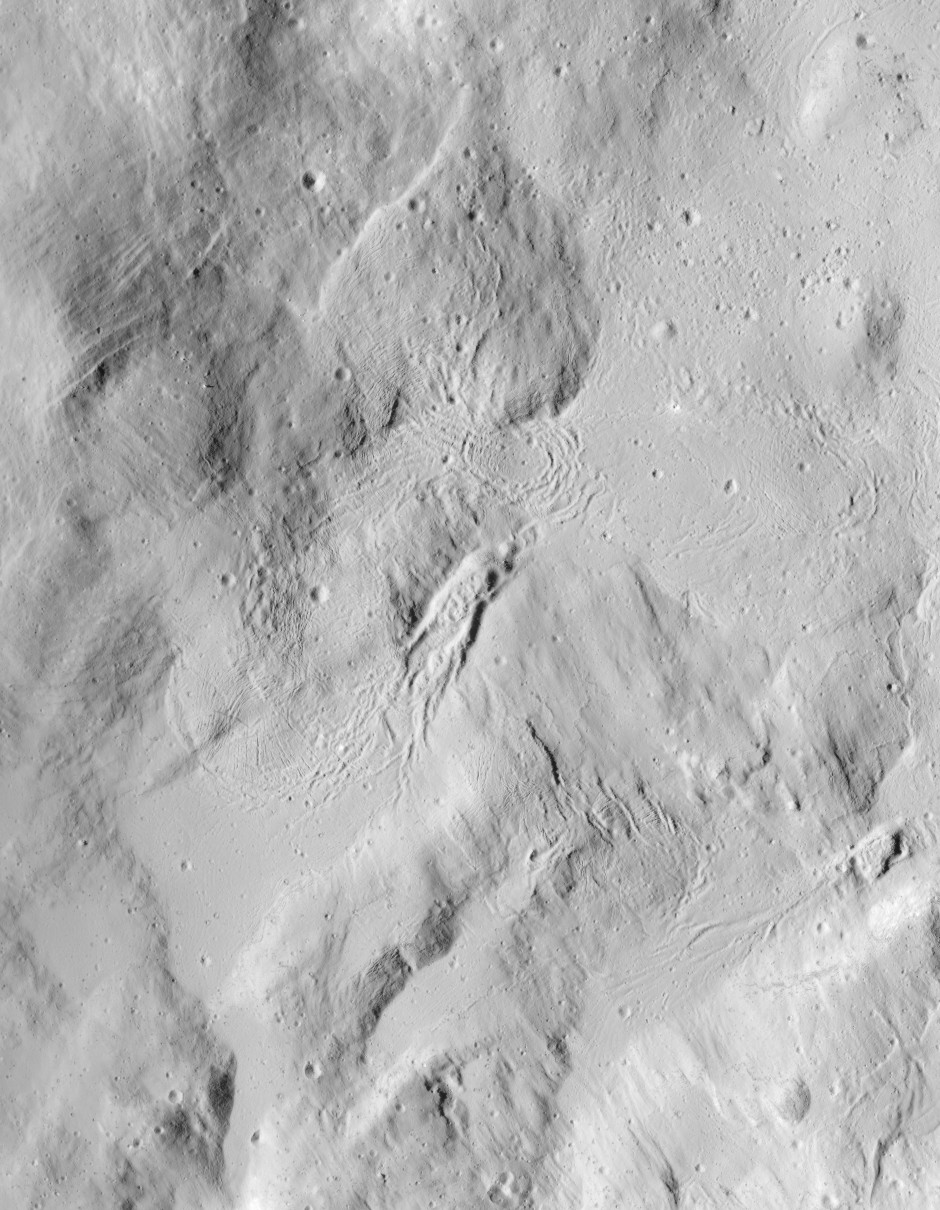
Closeup of the impact melt northeast of the crater, showing flow structures, from Apollo 16

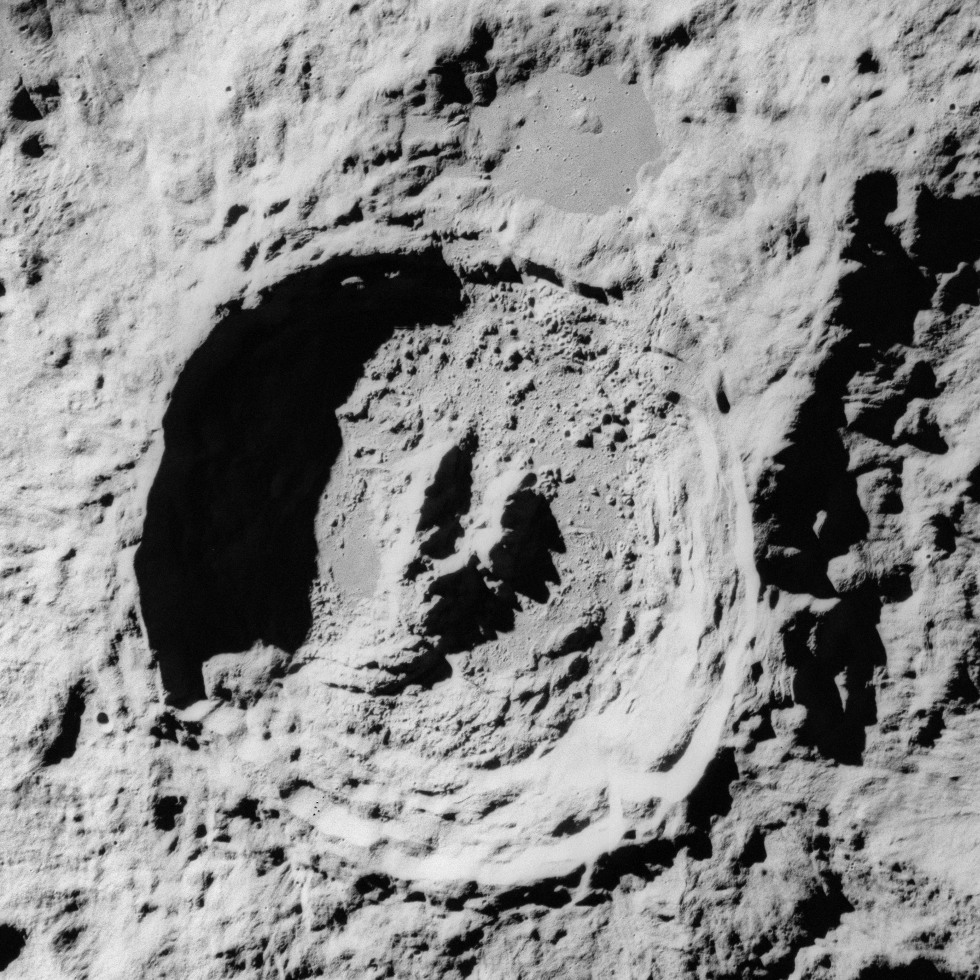
View of King during Apollo 16's trans-earth injection
