= Montes Harbinger =

Isolated cluster of lunar mountains

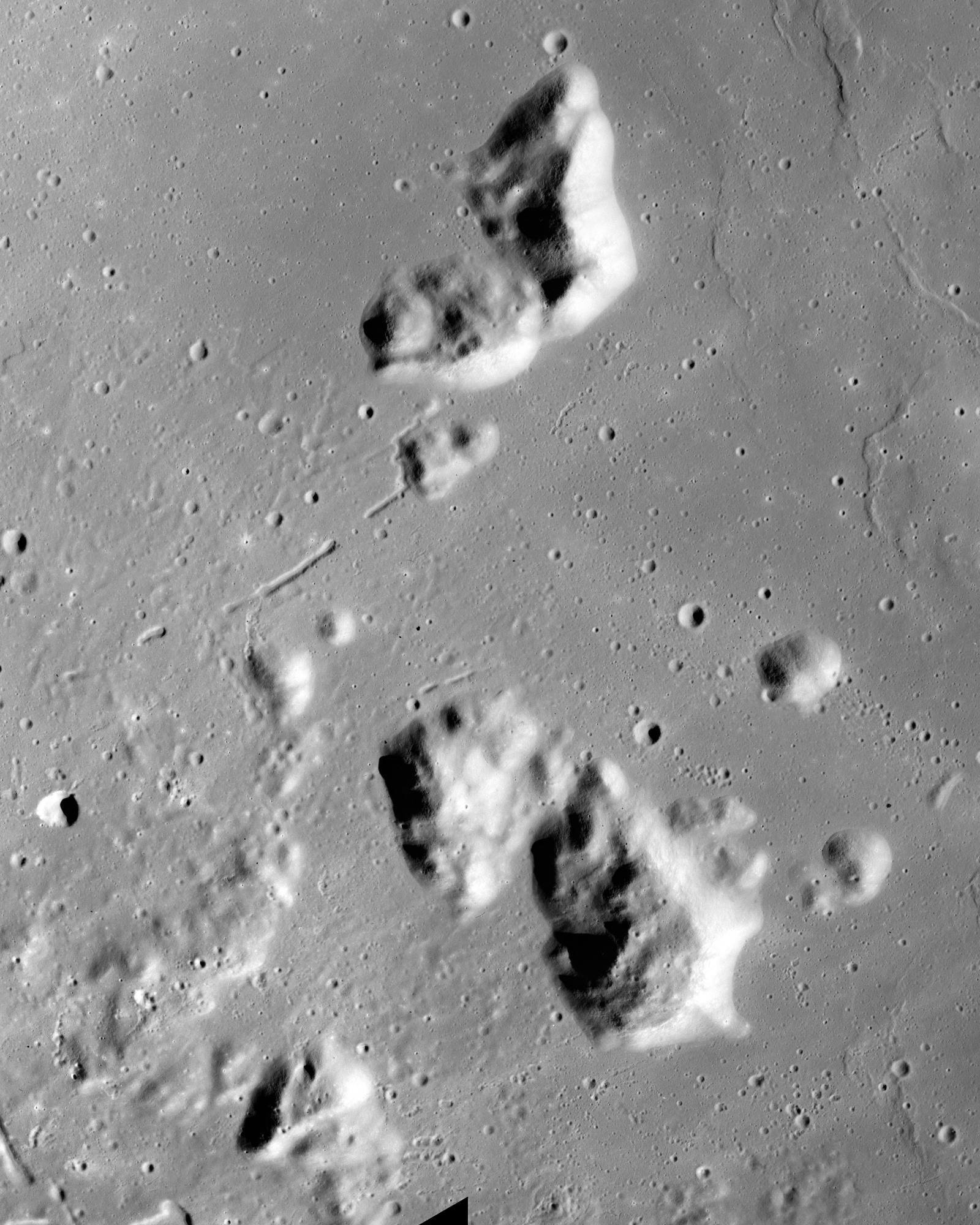
- Apollo 15 image

Highest point
- Listing: Lunar mountains
- Coordinates: 26.9°N 41.3°W

Geography
- Location: the Moon

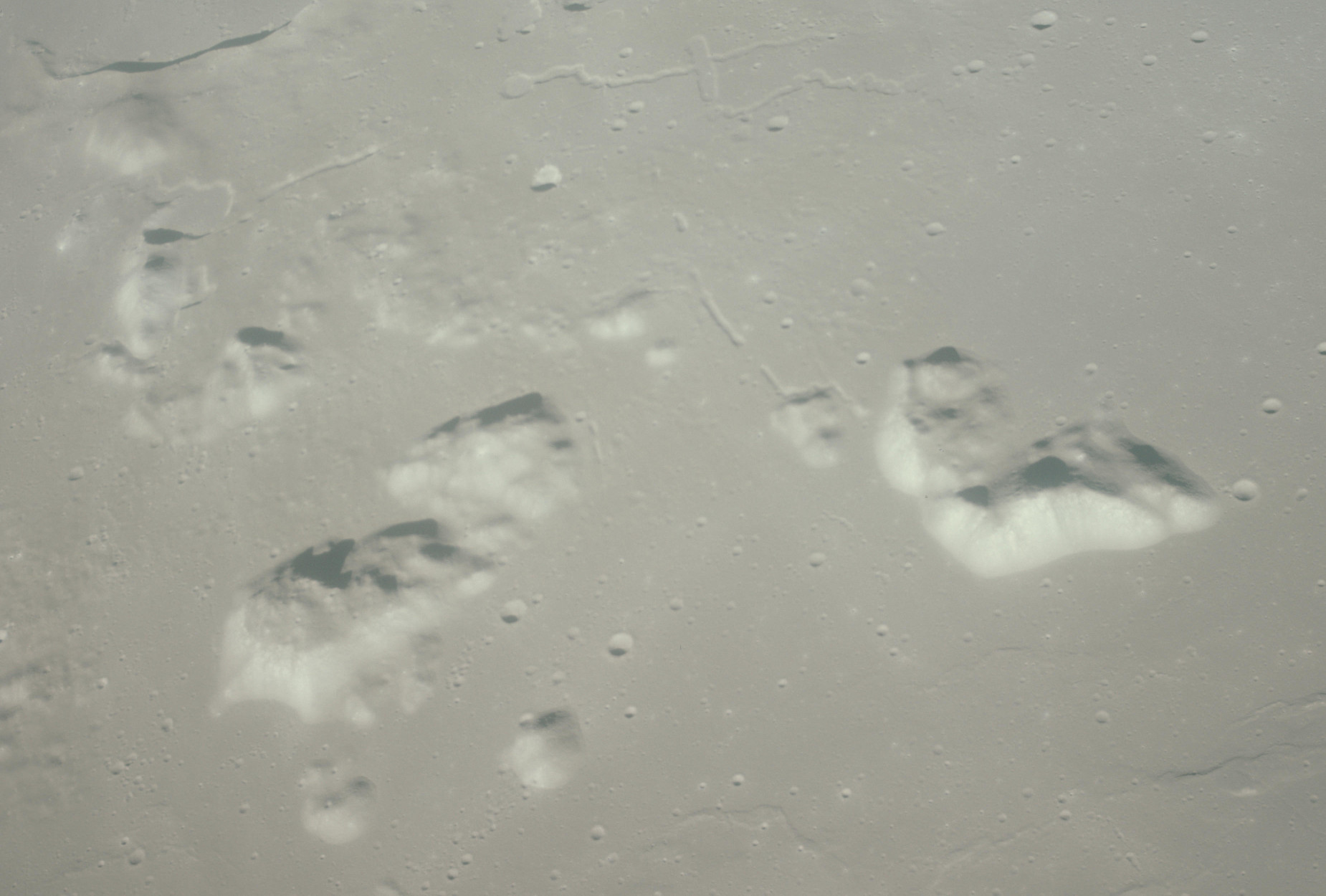
Oblique view facing west, also from Apollo 15

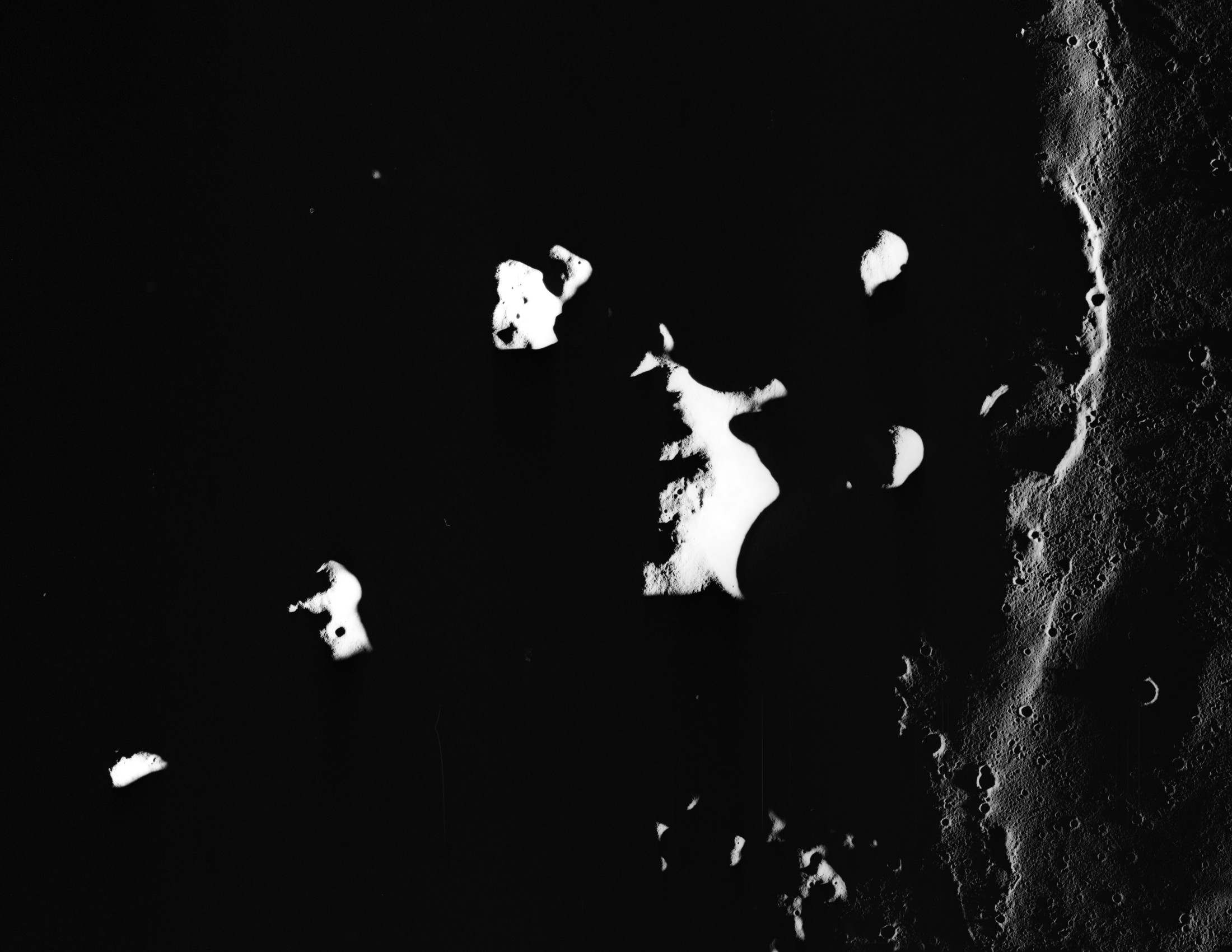
Southern Montes Harbinger at the terminator, foretelling sunrise on Aristarchus

Montes Harbinger is an isolated cluster of lunar mountains at the western edge of the Mare Imbrium basin.

The mountains consist of four primary ridges plus several smaller hills, each forming a small rise surrounded by the lunar mare. The cluster is centered at selenographic coordinates 26.9° N, 41.3° W, within a diameter of 93 km. The formation is so-named because the peaks serve as the harbingers of dawn on the crater Aristarchus, located to the southwest.

The flooded crater Prinz is located to the southwest.
