= Mons André =

Mountain on the Moon

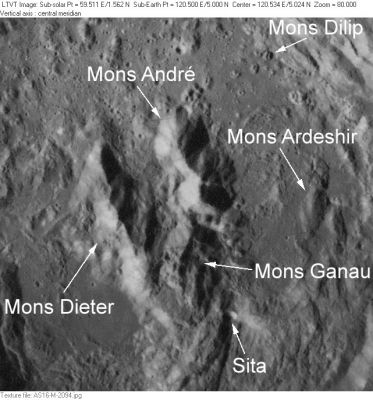
- Coordinates: 5.18°N 120.56°E

Mons André is a geological structure of the surface of the Moon. It is located inside King Crater, west of Mons Ardeshir. Its diameter is about 10 km. The name, given in 1976, comes from the French name André.
