= Mons Vitruvius =

Mountain on the Moon

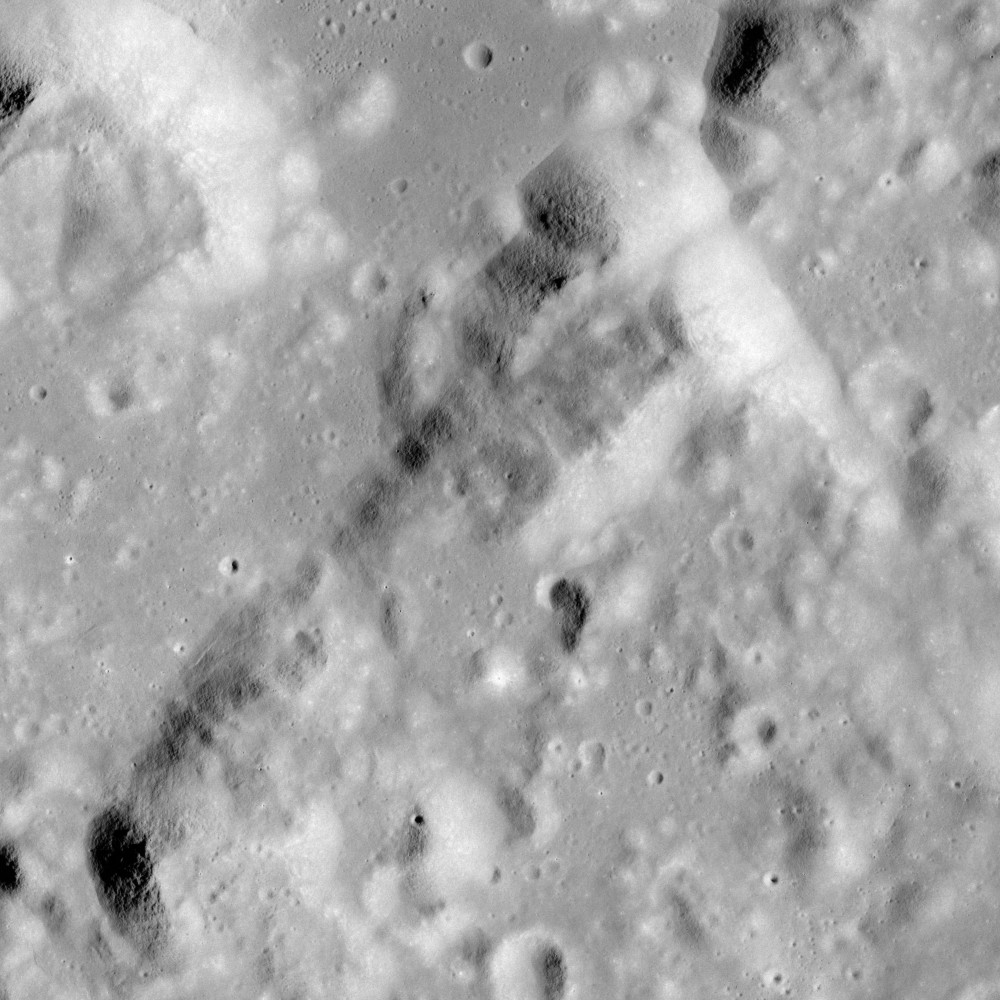
- Apollo 17 image

Highest point
- Elevation: 2.3 km
- Listing: Lunar mountains
- Coordinates: 19.4°N 30.8°E

Naming
- Etymology: Marcus Vitruvius Pollio

Geography
- Location: the Moon

Mons Vitruvius is a mountain on the Moon that is located in the Montes Taurus region just to the north of Mare Tranquillitatis and to the southeast of Mare Serenitatis. This massif is located at selenographic coordinates of 19.4° N, 30.8° E, and it has a diameter across the base of 15 km. It rises to a maximum height of about 2.3 km near the northeastern end. This mountain was named after the nearby crater Vitruvius, located to the south-southeast. The eponym for this crater is ancient Roman engineer and architect Marcus Vitruvius Pollio.

The Apollo 17 mission landed in the Taurus–Littrow valley to the north of this mountain.

== See also ==
- List of mountains on the Moon
