= Herodotus (crater) =

Circular depression on the Moon

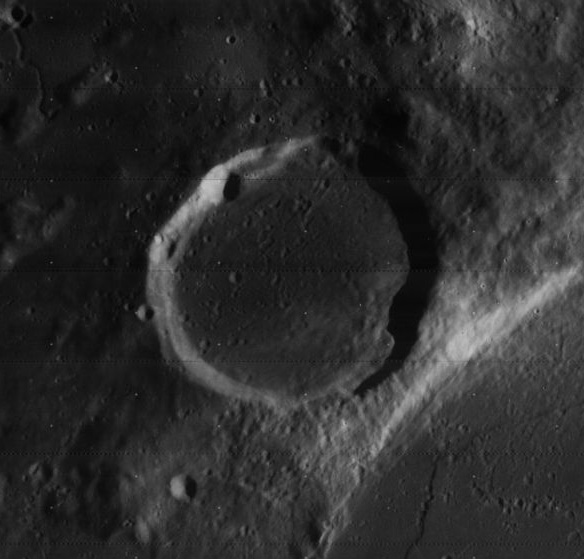
- Lunar Orbiter 4 image
- Coordinates: 23.2°N 49.7°W
- Diameter: 35 km
- Depth: 1.3 km
- Colongitude: 49° at sunrise
- Eponym: Herodotus

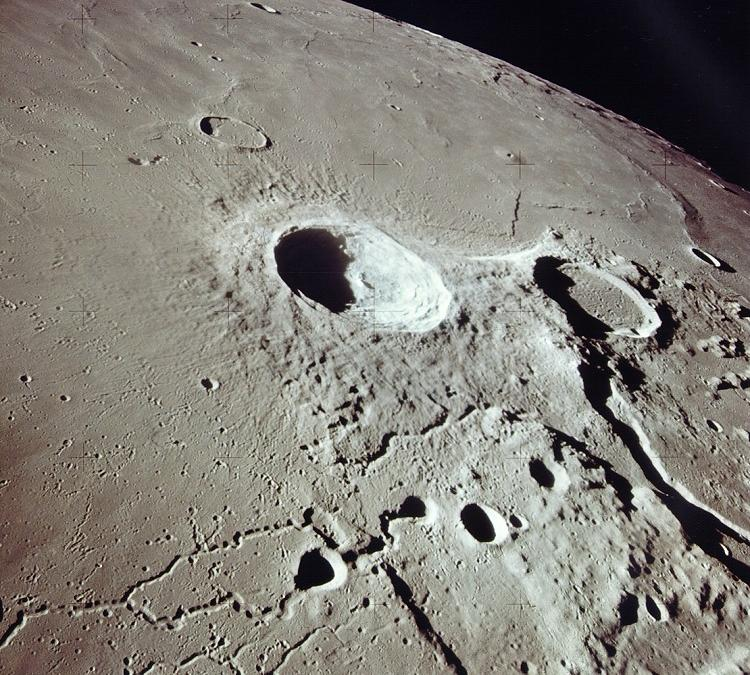
Herodotus is to the right in this view to the south from Apollo 15. NASA photo.

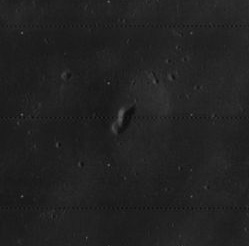
Herodotus Omega (Lunar Orbiter 4 image)

Herodotus is a lunar impact crater located on a low shelf in the midst of the Oceanus Procellarum. To the east is the slightly larger crater Aristarchus. West across the mare is Schiaparelli. Almost 70 km due south on the mare surface is a solitary lunar dome designated Herodotus Omega (ω). It has a diameter of 12 km and rises to a height of around 220 m.

The crater Herodotus has a slightly irregular, narrow rim that appears somewhat oblong due to foreshortening. The inner floor has been flooded with lava, and has a lower albedo than its brighter and more prominent neighbor Aristarchus. There is a small craterlet overlapping the northwest rim, but otherwise the outer wall has not suffered significant wear. Nevertheless, the rim is unusually thin in relation to its size.

To the north of Herodotus is the start of the Vallis Schröteri, a valley that has a length of 160 kilometers and a maximum depth of nearly a kilometer. It begins at a small crater 25 km north of the rim, then winds across the surface to the north, before turning northwest and finally to the southwest before coming to a precipitous end at the edge of the raised shelf on which Herodotus is located. The valley is wider at its crater head than elsewhere, which has given it the nickname of the "Cobra Head".

== Satellite craters ==
By convention these features are identified on lunar maps by placing the letter on the side of the crater midpoint that is closest to Herodotus.

Herodotus	Latitude	Longitude	Diameter
A	21.5° N	52.0° W	10 km
B	22.6° N	55.4° W	6 km
C	21.9° N	55.0° W	5 km
E	29.5° N	51.8° W	48 km
G	24.7° N	50.2° W	4 km
H	26.8° N	50.0° W	6 km
K	24.5° N	51.9° W	5 km
L	26.1° N	53.2° W	4 km
N	23.7° N	50.0° W	4 km
R	27.3° N	53.9° W	4 km
S	27.7° N	53.4° W	4 km
T	27.9° N	53.8° W	5 km

The following crater has been renamed by the IAU.

- Herodotus D — See Raman.
