= Mons Ardeshir =

Mountain on the Moon

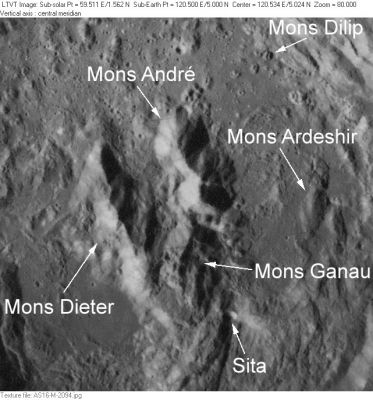
- The mountains inside King crater as seen from Apollo 16

Highest point
- Listing: Lunar mountains
- Coordinates: 5.03°N 121.04°E

Geography
- Location: the Moon

Mons Ardeshir is one of the mountains on the Moon, inside crater King. Its diameter is 8 km. In 1976 it was named after Persian king Ardeshir.

== Links ==
- NASA topophotomap (1974)
- Lunar chart LAC-65
- Mons Ardeshir on The Moon Wiki
