= Maraldi =

Maraldi may refer to:

- Maraldi (lunar crater)
- Maraldi (Martian crater)
- Mons Maraldi, a mountain on the Moon
- Maraldy (lake), Pavlodar Region, Kazakhstan

== People with the surname ==
- Giacomo Filippo Maraldi (1665–1729), French-Italian astronomer and mathematician
- Giovanni Domenico Maraldi (1709–1788), Italian astronomer, grandson of Giacomo Filippo
