= Maraldi (lunar crater) =

Crater on the Moon

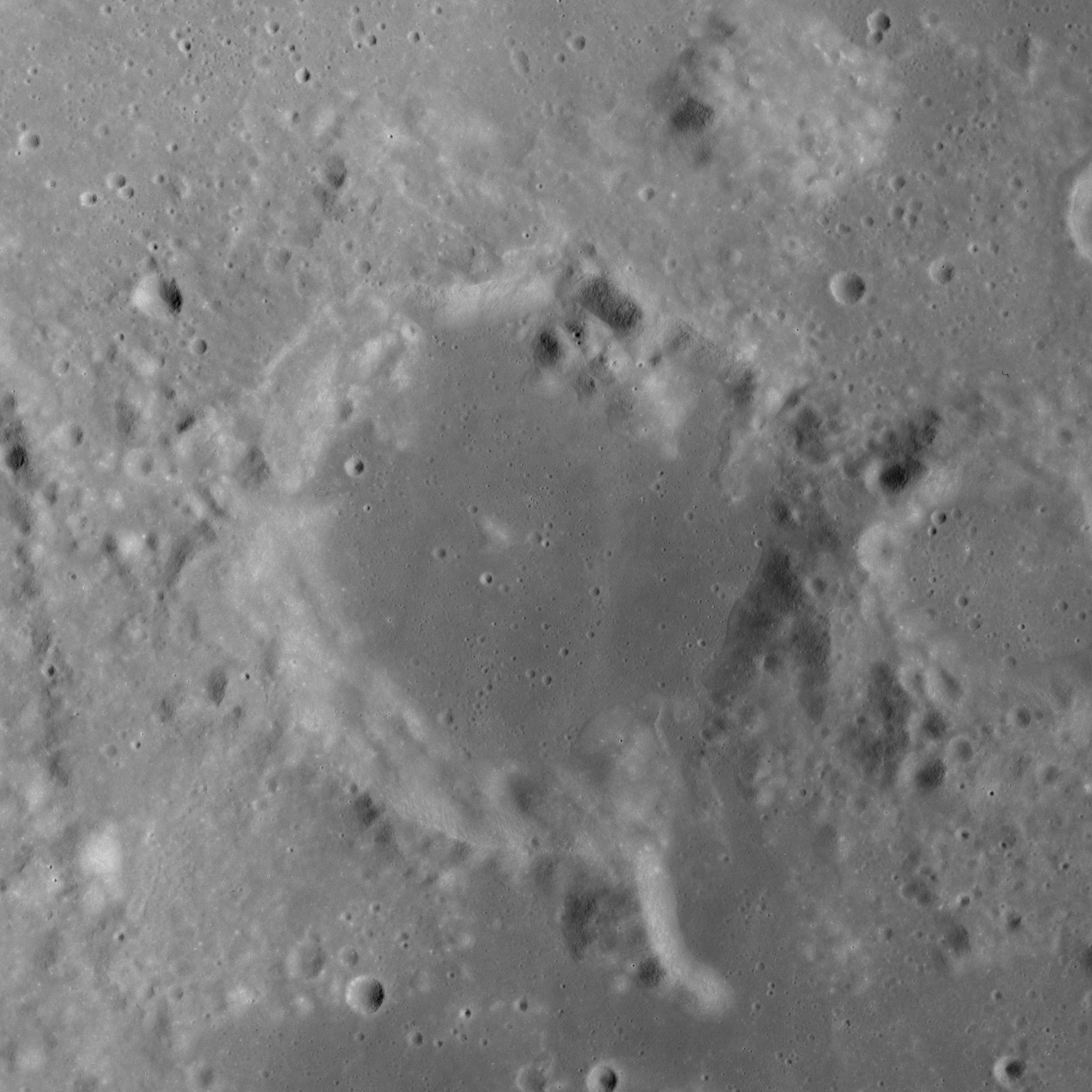
- Apollo 17 Mapping Camera image
- Coordinates: 19.36°N 34.80°E
- Diameter: 39.62 km (24.62 mi)
- Depth: 1.5 km
- Colongitude: 325° at sunrise
- Formation: Nectarian
- Eponym: Giovanni Domenico Maraldi and Giacomo F. Maraldi

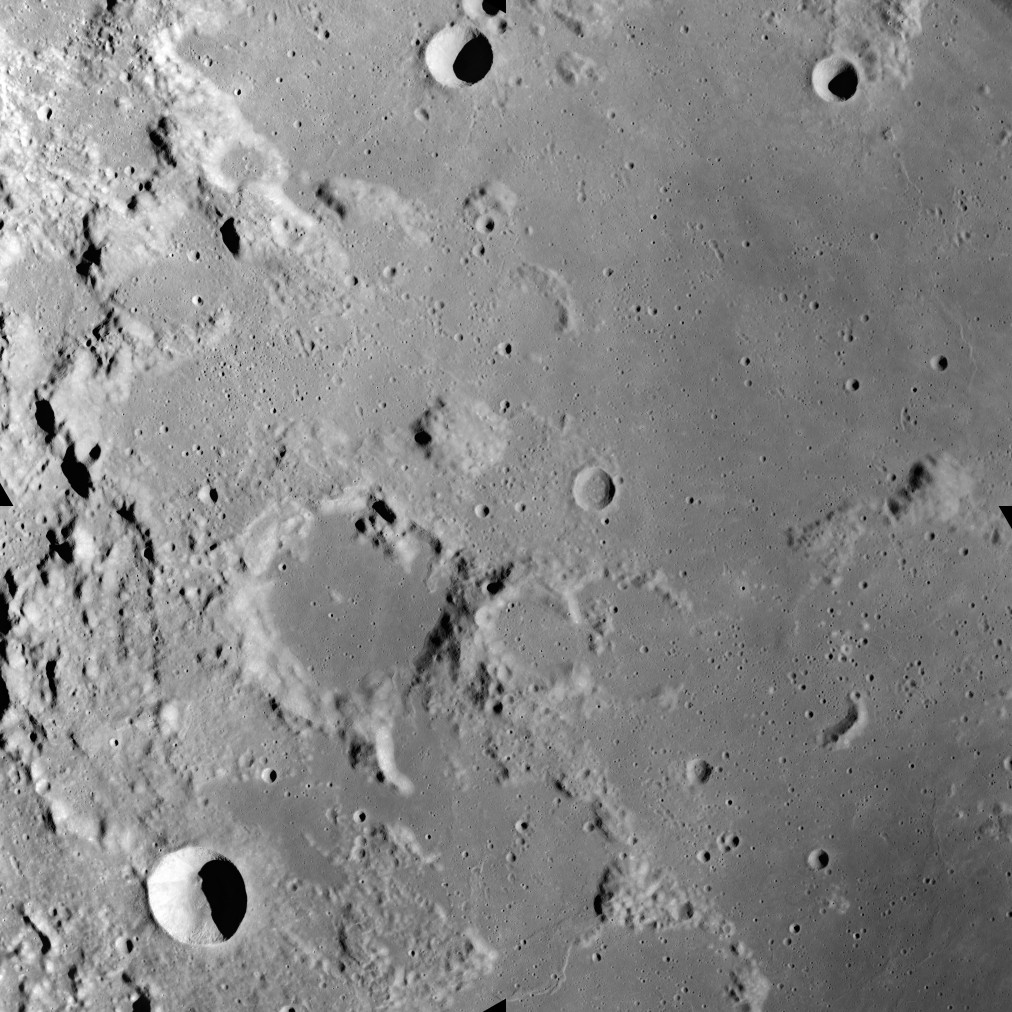
Context image showning Gardner (lower left) and Maraldi (center) from Apollo 17. NASA photo.

Maraldi is a worn, eroded crater on the western edge of the Sinus Amoris, in the northeast part of the Moon. It is located near Römer crater, found to the north. To the west-southwest is the crater Vitruvius, and to the northwest lies the worn Littrow crater. Just to the northeast of the crater is the dome-like Mons Maraldi rise.

On the lunar geologic timescale, Maraldi is a crater of Nectarian age. Maraldi has a very worn outer wall that is deeply incised and has the appearance of a circular range of peaks rather than a crater rim. The interior has been flooded with basaltic lava, leaving a flat surface with a low albedo. There is a low ridge just to the northwest of the mid-point, and several tiny craters mark the floor surface.

The crater is named after two Italian-born French astronomers: Giovanni Domenico Maraldi and Giacomo F. Maraldi. This designation was officially adopted by the International Astronomical Union in 1935.

== Satellite craters ==
By convention these features are identified on lunar maps by placing the letter on the side of the crater midpoint that is closest to Maraldi.

Maraldi	Latitude	Longitude	Diameter
A	20.0° N	36.3° E	8 km
D	16.7° N	36.1° E	67 km
E	17.8° N	35.8° E	31 km
F	19.2° N	35.8° E	18 km
N	18.4° N	36.8° E	5 km
R	20.3° N	33.2° E	5 km
W	13.2° N	36.1° E	4 km

The following craters have been renamed by the IAU.

- Maraldi B — See Lucian (crater).
- Maraldi M — See Theophrastus (crater).
