= Fabbroni =

Fabbroni may refer to:

== People ==
- Giacinto Fabbroni, Italian painter
- Giovanni Fabbroni (1752-1822), Italian naturalist, economist, and chemist
- Luciano Fabro (1936-2007), Italian boxer

== Others ==
- Fabbroni (crater), Lunar crater
