= Lucian (crater) =

Crater on the Moon

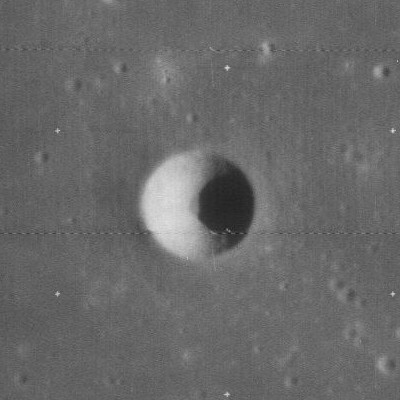
- Lunar Orbiter 4 image
- Coordinates: 14.34°N 36.78°E
- Diameter: 6.85 km (4.26 mi)
- Depth: 1.6 km (0.99 mi)
- Colongitude: 324° at sunrise
- Eponym: Lucian

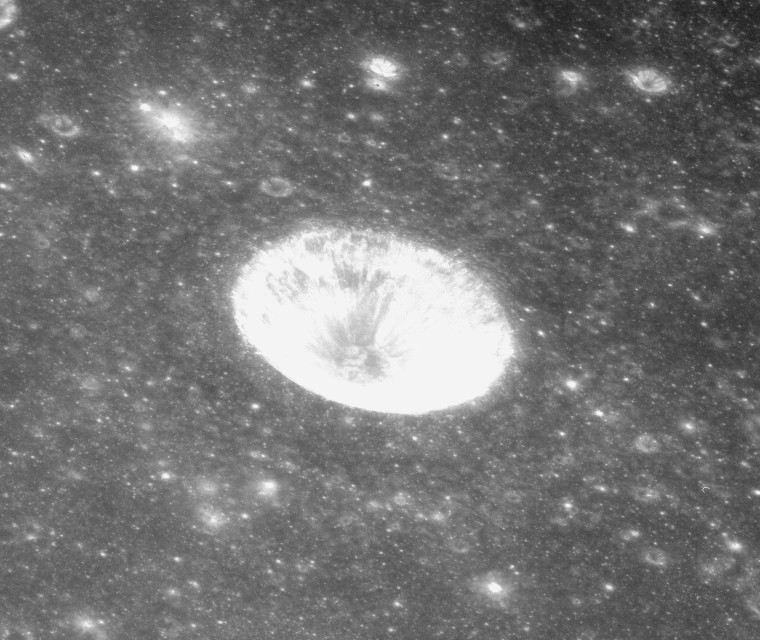
Oblique view from Apollo 15

Lucian is a tiny lunar impact crater that is located in the northeastern part of the Mare Tranquillitatis. It was named in 1973 after 2nd century Greek writer Lucian of Samosata. The nearest named craters are Lyell to the east-southeast, Theophrastus to the northeast and Gardner to the north-northeast. A little farther to the north is Maraldi crater. Lucian was previously designated Maraldi B.

This is a circular, cone-shaped formation with a negligible interior floor. It has not been significantly degraded by impact erosion.
