= Teresa Ciamagnini Fabbroni =

Italian socialite (1763–1811)

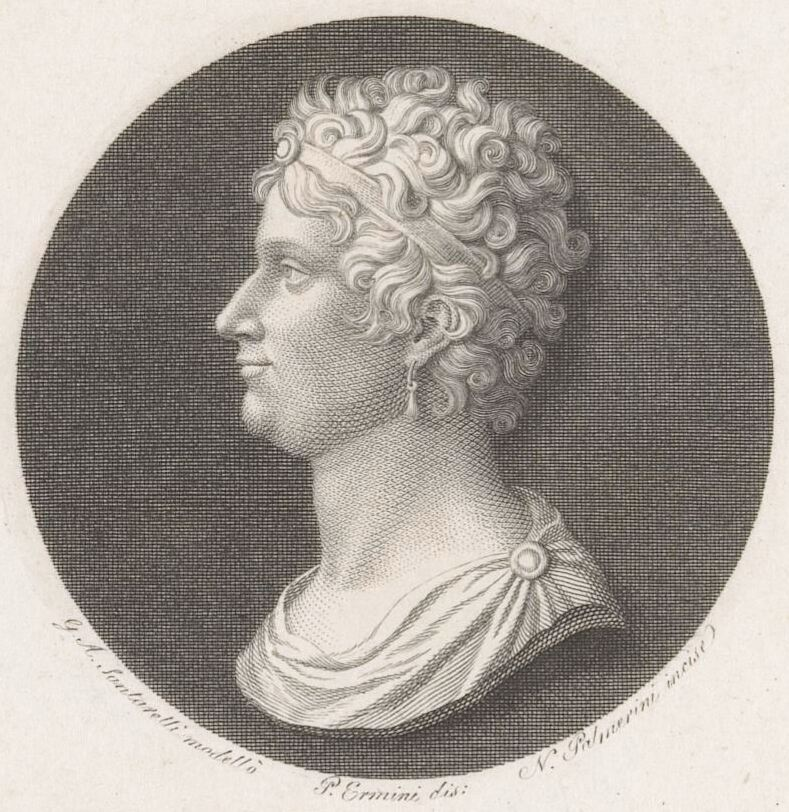
- Portrait of Teresa Fabroni, 1814
- Born: 13 February 1763; Grosseto, Grand Duchy of Tuscany
- Died: 1 October 1811 (aged 48); Florence, Arno, First French Empire
- Spouse: Giovanni Fabbroni
- Father: Giuseppe Bencivenni Pelli (adoptive)

Maria Teresa Ciamagnini Pelli Fabbroni (13 February 1763 – 1 October 1811) was an Italian socialite, intellectual and cultural figure of late 18th-century Florence. Born to a disgraced family and adopted by Giuseppe Bencivenni Pelli, director of the Uffizi Gallery, she received an exceptional Enlightenment education in literature, languages, arts, and sciences. Known for her beauty, refinement, and erudition, she hosted one of Florence's most prominent literary salons, attracting poets, artists, and scholars of her time.

== Life and career ==
Teresa Ciamagnini was born in Grosseto on 13 February 1763 to Major Alberto Ciamagnini, commander of the Grosseto fortress, and Caterina Lazzeretti. The family had fallen into financial ruin due to legal troubles involving her father. After his sudden death in 1769, Teresa followed her mother to Florence, where, thanks to the support of the writer Marco Lastri, they were accommodated at the castle of Signa.

In 1770, her mother became seriously ill, and Giuseppe Bencivenni Pelli, director of the Uffizi Gallery and friend of Lastri, formally adopted Teresa, while her mother died three years later. Pelli's adoption reflected his Enlightenment ideals regarding female education, which he promoted in the journal La Toelette, and inspired his moral novella Il caso, based on Teresa's adoption.

Teresa grew up in a highly intellectual environment and received an extensive education in literature, languages, art, history, philosophy, agriculture, and domestic economy—exceptional for a woman in 18th-century Tuscany. At the age of nine, she was portrayed by Gaetano Vascellini in the series Ritratti d'uomini illustri toscani. Despite her talents, Pelli imposed strict moral guidelines, restricting her musical and literary pursuits and fostering modesty, humility, and discretion.

In 1781, Teresa entered into a secret engagement with Antonio Maria Chelli, which her adoptive father opposed; the engagement was legally dissolved in 1782. That same year, she married Giovanni Fabbroni, a naturalist, economist, and agronomist, later director of the Royal Museum of Physics and Natural History. Together, they participated actively in Florentine society, attending theaters, salons, and social events.

Teresa's beauty, culture, and refinement attracted the attention of poets, artists, and intellectuals, including Vittorio Alfieri, Giovanni Fantoni, Salomone Fiorentino, Lorenzo Pignotti, and Ippolito Pindemonte, as well as poets Corilla Olimpica and Amarilli Etrusca. She hosted distinguished figures such as Antonio Canova, Melchiorre Cesarotti, Pietro Verri, and Wilhelm von Humboldt. Her literary salon became one of Florence's most prominent cultural centers.

Between 1783 and 1798, she had three children, only the eldest of whom, Leopoldo, survived to adulthood, becoming a scholar and magistrate. Teresa died on 1 October 1811 at the age of 48 from a severe colic and was buried alongside Pelli in the Florence Cathedral, with a monument she had commissioned from Francesco Carradori.

Although Teresa possessed literary and poetic talents, most of her works remained private and unpublished due to her adoptive father's restrictions. Nevertheless, some poems, English translations, and French compositions survive, along with extensive correspondence with Pelli, now preserved in the State Archives of Florence. In her honor, the royal normal school for teachers in Grosseto was later named after her.

== Sources ==
- La donna. Opera enciclopedica. Vol. 1. Turin: Claudio Perrin. 1869.
- Giordano, Antonella (1994). Letterate toscane del Settecento. Un regesto. Florence: All'Insegna del Giglio.
- Innocenti, Adone (1928). Grosseto. Storia ed arte. Grosseto: Etruria Nuova.
- Manno Tolu, Rosalia (2010). "Dalle lettere di Teresa Ciamagnini Fabbroni al "padre per elezione" Giuseppe Pelli Bencivenni". In Saveria Chemotti (ed.). Padri nostri. Archetipi e modelli delle relazioni tra padri e figlie. Padua: Il Poligrafo.
- Rosini, Giovanni (1814). Elogio di Teresa Pelli Fabroni. Pisa: Firmino Didot.
- Rossi, Emanuele (1841). Florilegio femminile. Vol. 3. Ferrando.
- Soldani, Simonetta (2004). "Donne educanti, donne da educare. Un profilo della stampa femminile toscana (1770-1945)". In Silvia Franchini; Simonetta Soldani (eds.). Donne e giornalismo: percorsi e presenze di una storia di genere. Milan: FrancoAngeli. ISBN 978-88-464-5289-4.
