= Mons Esam =

Mountain on the Moon

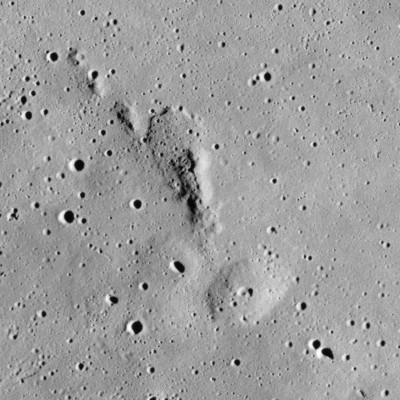
- Apollo 17 Mapping Camera Image, with Mons Esam at center, Diana below center, and Grace below right of center

Highest point
- Elevation: 6622 m
- Listing: Lunar mountains
- Coordinates: 14.6°N 35.7°E

Geography
- Location: the Moon

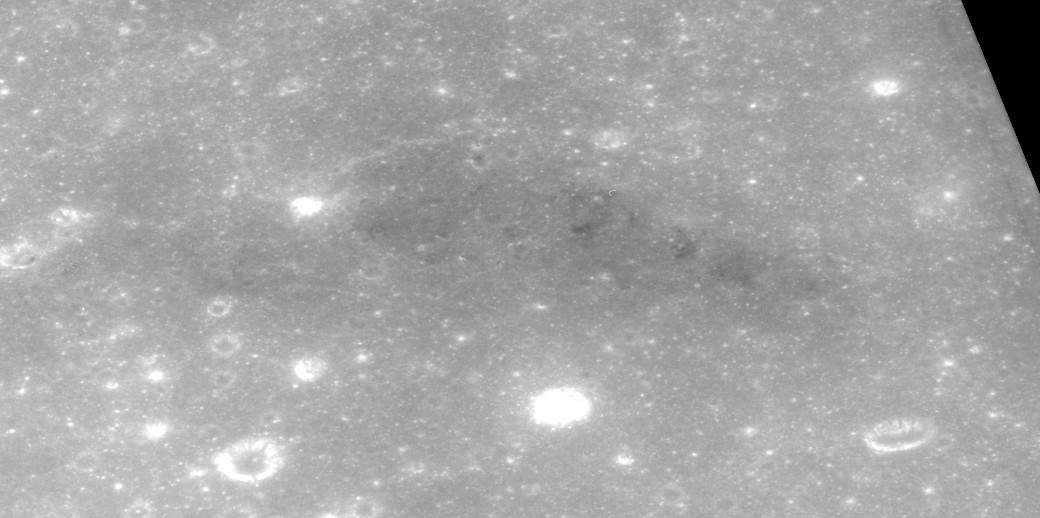
Oblique view of Mons Esam, facing north, at high sun angle, from Apollo 15

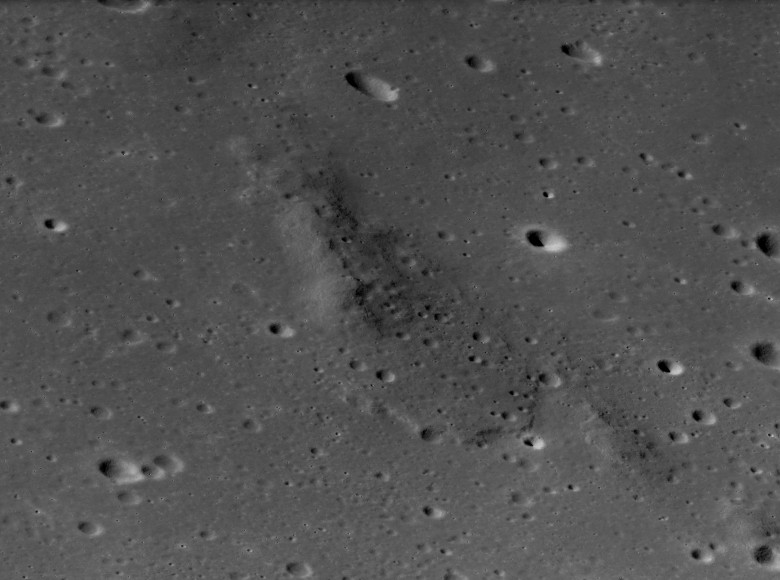
Oblique view of Mons Esam, facing south, at low sun angle, from Apollo 17

Mons Esam is a small, isolated mountain in the northern part of the Mare Tranquillitatis. It is located to the southeast of the crater Vitruvius and to the west-northwest of Lyell. To the northeast of this ridge is the bay called Sinus Amoris.

The selenographic coordinate of this feature is 14.6° N, 35.7° E, and it has a maximum diameter at the base of 8 km. The name of this feature is an Arabic masculine name (Arabic: عصام, romanized: eisam), and it was not chosen to represent a specific individual. This peak is a lunar cone that was formed through tectonic processes, which rises roughly 400 meters above the surrounding plains.

A pair of tiny craters just to the south of Mons Esam have been assigned names by the IAU. These are listed in the table below. The craters are at the tops of two lunar domes, which are most likely volcanoes and were not formed by impacts.

Crater	Latitude	Longitude	Diameter	Name source
Diana	14.3° N	35.7° E	2 km	Latin feminine name
Grace	14.2° N	35.9° E	1 km	English feminine name
