= Franck (crater) =

Crater on the Moon

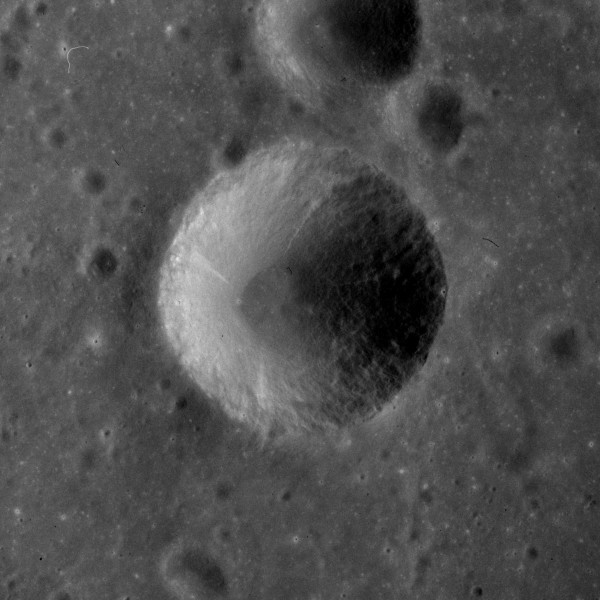
- Apollo 15 image
- Coordinates: 22.6°N 35.5°E
- Diameter: 11.91 km (7.40 mi)
- Depth: 2.2 km (1.4 mi)
- Colongitude: 325° at sunrise
- Eponym: James Franck

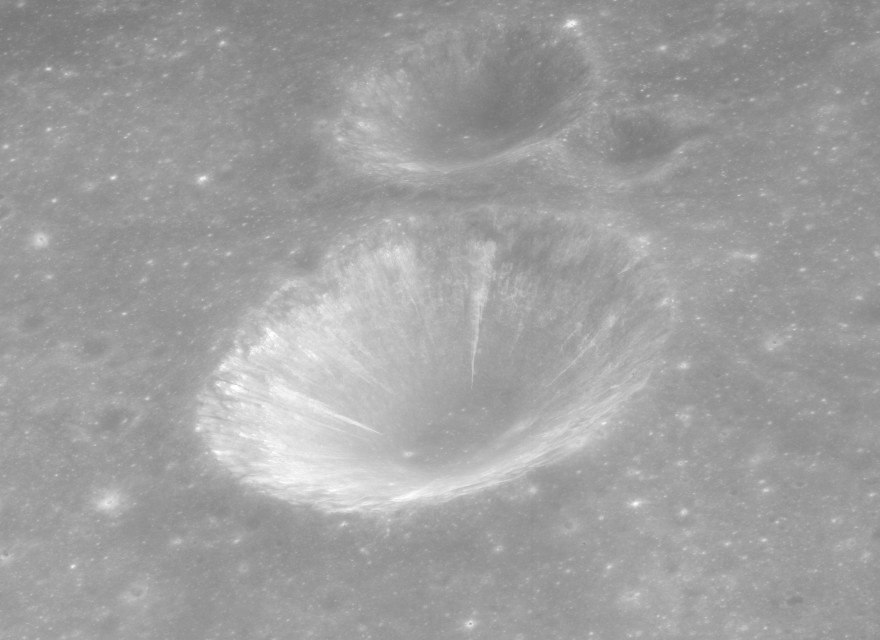
Oblique view from Apollo 15

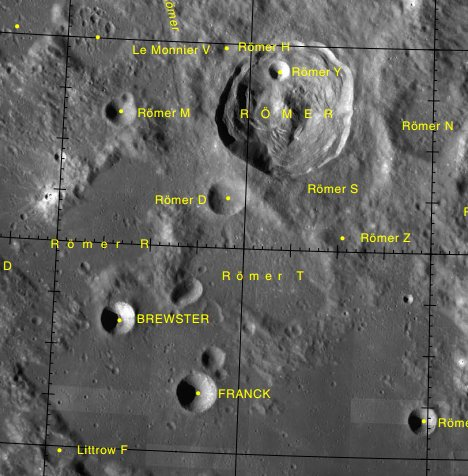
Franck Crater is to the south of the photo, to the north is Römer and its satellite craters with Römer T being the closest of it located north (Photo from the LRO)

Franck is a small lunar impact crater that lies near the north end of Sinus Amoris, a bay on the northern part of Mare Tranquillitatis. Its diameter is 12 km. The crater lies just to the southeast of Brewster crater, and farther to the south of Römer.

This is a circular, bowl-shaped crater with a sharp rim that has not been significantly eroded. The interior walls slope down to the tiny floor at the midpoint. Just to the north of Franck is a joined pair of smaller craters, and the three nearly form a merged cluster of impacts.

This formation is named after German physicist and Nobel laureate James Franck (1882-1964). Its designation was officially adopted by the International Astronomical Union in 1973. Franck was previously designated Römer K.
