= Brewster (crater) =

Crater on the Moon

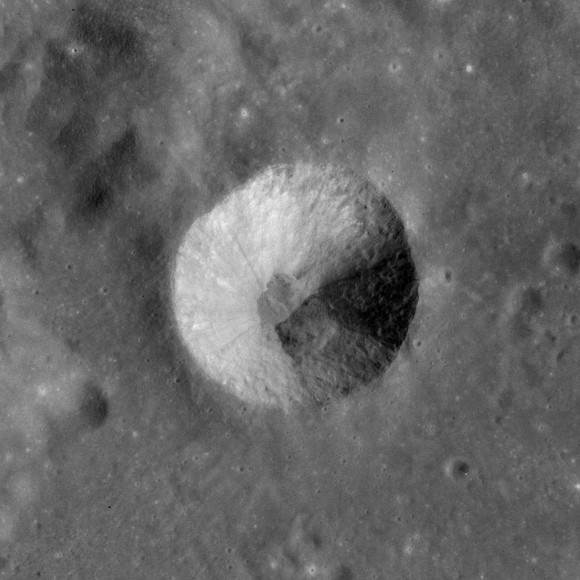
- Apollo 15 image
- Coordinates: 23.3°N 34.7°E
- Diameter: 9.83 km (6.11 mi)
- Depth: 2.1 km (1.3 mi)
- Colongitude: 325° at sunrise
- Eponym: David Brewster

Brewster is a small lunar impact crater in the northern fringes of Sinus Amoris. Its diameter is 9.8 km. This formation lies to the southwest of the larger crater Römer. To the southeast of Brewster is the similar-sized Franck. Brewster is cup-shaped and symmetrical, with no overlapping craters of note. A low ridge is attached to the northern rim. The crater interior has a relatively high interior albedo compared to the surrounding terrain.

This crater was named after the Scottish optician, David Brewster (1781-1868). Prior to its name being formally adopted by the International Astronomical Union in 1976, it was identified as Römer L.

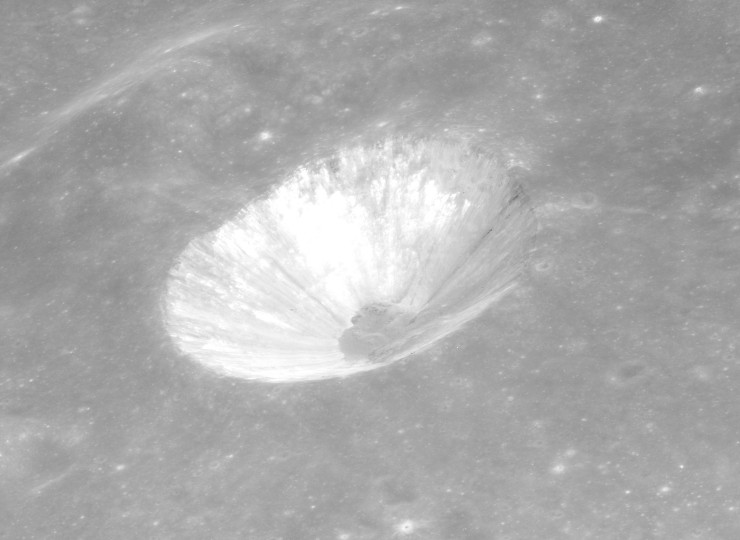
Oblique view from Apollo 15

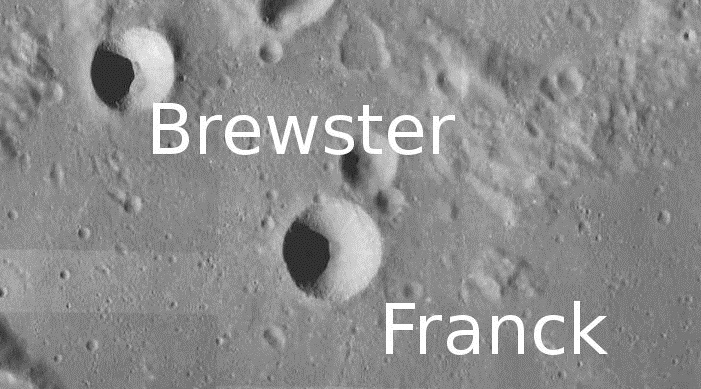
Brewster crater is on the left on the photo and it is located northwest of Franck
