= Kirchhoff (crater) =

Crater on the Moon

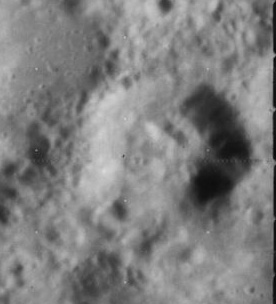
- Lunar Orbiter 4 image
- Coordinates: 30.3°N 38.8°E
- Diameter: 25 km
- Depth: 2.6 km
- Colongitude: 322° at sunrise
- Eponym: Gustav Kirchhoff

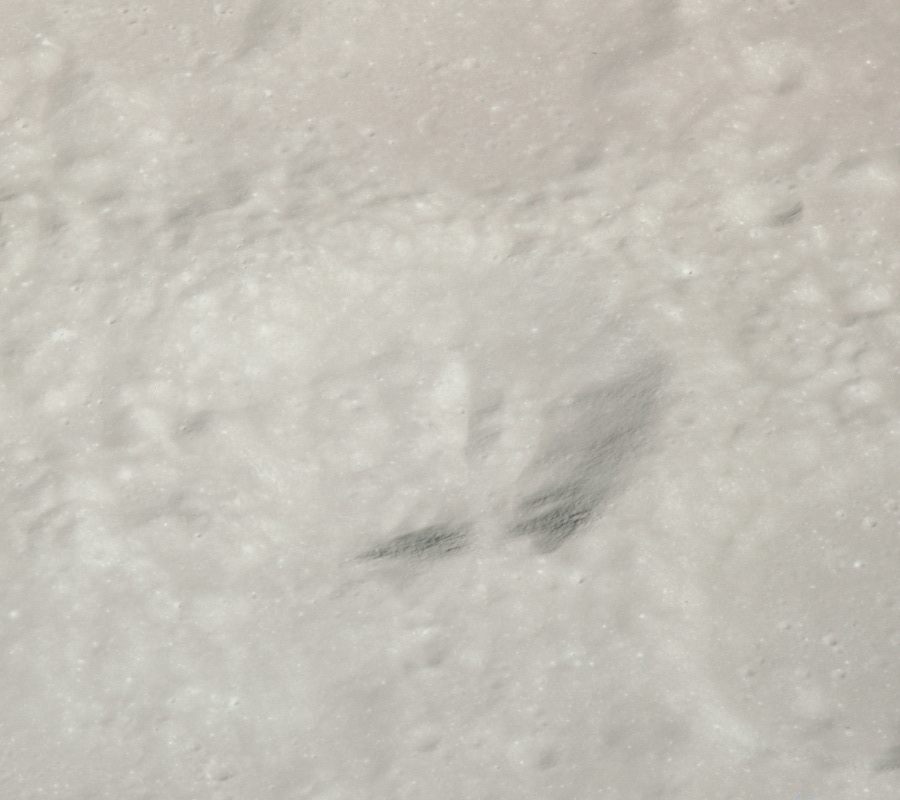
Apollo 15 image

Kirchhoff is a small lunar impact crater that is located in the northern part of the Montes Taurus range. It was named after German physicist Gustav Kirchhoff. It lies to the west of the crater Newcomb, and southeast of the crater pair of Hall and G. Bond.

This is a circular, bowl-shaped feature that lies in the midst of rugged lunar terrain. The satellite crater Kirchhoff C adjoins the eastern rim. There is a low rise at the midpoint of the interior floor.

== Satellite craters ==
By convention these features are identified on lunar maps by placing the letter on the side of the crater midpoint that is closest to Kirchhoff.

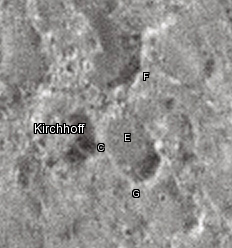
Kirchhoff crater and its satellite craters taken from Earth in 2012 at the University of Hertfordshire's Bayfordbury Observatory with the telescopes Meade LX200 14" and Lumenera Skynyx 2-1

Kirchhoff	Latitude	Longitude	Diameter
C	30.3° N	39.7° E	23 km
E	30.7° N	40.4° E	26 km
F	31.5° N	40.9° E	23 km
G	29.8° N	40.2° E	22 km
