= Messier 2 =

Globular cluster in the constellation Aquarius

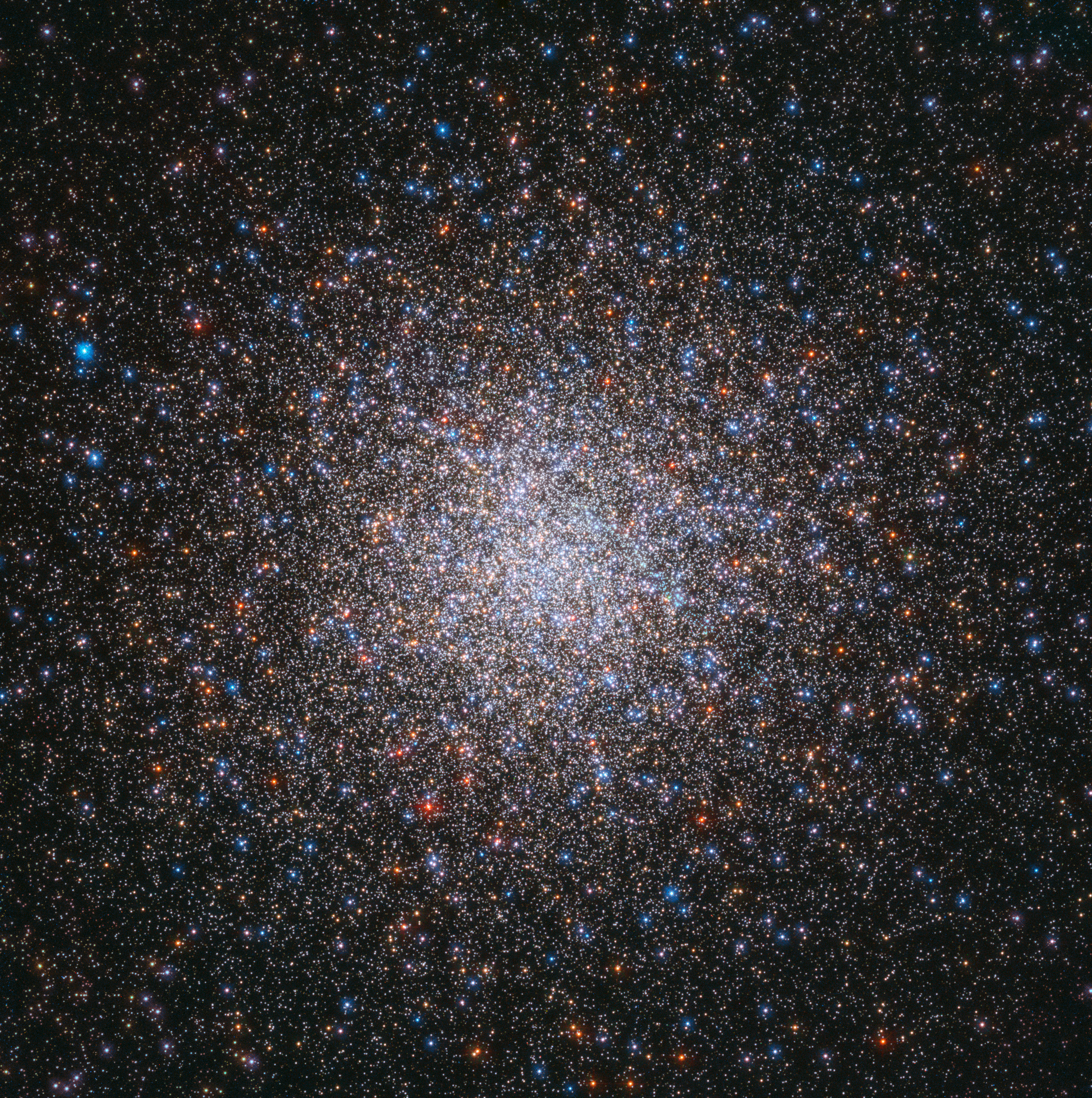
- Messier 2 by Hubble Space Telescope; 2.5′ view

Observation data (J2000 epoch)
- Class: II
- Constellation: Aquarius
- Right ascension: 21^{h} 33^{m} 27.02^{s}
- Declination: –00° 49′ 23.7″
- Distance: 38,140 ly (11.693 kpc)
- Apparent magnitude (V): 6.5
- Apparent dimensions (V): 16.0′

Physical characteristics
- Mass: 1.04×10^{5} M_{☉}
- Radius: 87.3 ly
- Metallicity: [Fe/H] = –1.65 dex
- Estimated age: 12.5 Gyr
- Other designations: NGC 7089

Messier 2 or M2 (also designated NGC 7089) is a globular cluster in the constellation Aquarius, five degrees north of the star Beta Aquarii. It was discovered by Jean-Dominique Maraldi in 1746, and is one of the largest known globular clusters.

== Discovery and visibility ==
M2 was discovered by the French astronomer Jean-Dominique Maraldi in 1746 while observing a comet with Jacques Cassini. Charles Messier rediscovered it in 1760, but thought that it was a nebula without any stars associated with it. William Herschel, in 1783, was the first to resolve individual stars in the cluster.

M2 is, under extremely good conditions, just visible to the naked eye. Binoculars or a small telescope will identify this cluster as non-stellar, while larger telescopes will resolve individual stars, of which the brightest is of apparent magnitude 12.

== Characteristics ==
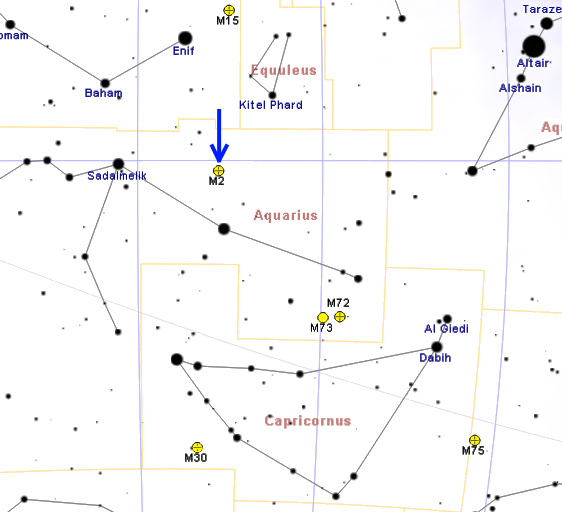
Chart showing location of M2

M2 is about 37,500 light-years distant from Earth. At 175 light-years in diameter, it is one of the larger globular clusters known. The cluster is rich, compact, and significantly elliptical. It is 12.5 billion years old and one of the older globular clusters associated with the Milky Way galaxy.

M2 contains about 150,000 stars, including 21 known variable stars. Its brightest stars are red and yellow giant stars. The overall spectral type is F4. M2 is part of the Gaia Sausage, the hypothesized remains of a merged dwarf galaxy.

Data from Gaia has led to the discovery of an extended tidal stellar stream, about 45 degrees long and 300 light-years (100 pc) wide, that is likely associated with M2. It was possibly perturbed due to the presence of the Large Magellanic Cloud.

Messier 2 is located within our Milky Way galaxy, and is one of the oldest clusters of stars designated to the Milky Way. Like most globular clusters, M2 is found within the galactic halo, specifically in the southern galactic cap. This places it right below the southern pole of the Milky Way.

== Oosterhoff classification ==
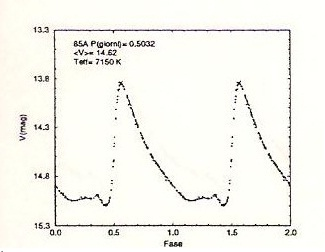
Light curve of an RRab variable star

M2 is defined as an Oosterhoff type II globular cluster. Oosterhoff type is a classification system of globular clusters originally observed by Pieter Oosterhoff in where globular clusters are generally separated into two types. Oosterhoff type is determined by metallicity, age, and average pulsation period of type ab RR Lyrae variable stars of the cluster. A cluster metallicity below −1.6, an age above 13 billion years, and an average RRab Lyrae pulsation period around .64 days indicates a type II cluster. This .64 day value, coupled with a metallicity of −1.65, provides evidence that M2 follows the Oosterhoff Gap phenomena. This is an observed gap in the grouping of type I and type II clusters in the Milky Way on a metallicity vs average RRab pulsation period plot.

M2 is a bit of an anomaly in reference to Oosterhoff type. While it satisfies the metallicity and RRab Lyrae pulsation period conditions, it actually has an age of 12.5 Gyr, well below the cutoff age of 13 Gyr normal for an Oosterhoff type II cluster. This is unexpected because the age of a cluster is generally determined from metallicity. However, this abnormality is explained in an article by Marín-Franch. Nevertheless, in a recent study, Botev et al. proposed a new lower limit of 13.2 Gyr for the age of M2.

== See also ==
- List of Messier objects
