= Irvine Clifton Gardner =

American optical physicist

Dr. Irvine Clifton Gardner (1889 – 1972) was an American physicist known for his contributions to optics and aerial photography.

== Biography ==
Gardner was born in 1889. In 1921, he joined the National Bureau of Standards (NBS), and in 1950, became chief of the Division of Optics and Meteorology. He headed a joint NBS-National Geographic Society expedition to Kazakhstan to observe the solar eclipse of June 19, 1936. The team took used a four-meter eclipse camera with a 23-centimeter astrographic lens to take the first natural color photographs of a solar eclipse. The next year Gardner joined a National Geographic-U.S. Navy expedition to the Canton Islands to photograph the solar eclipse of June 8, 1937. He retired from the Bureau of Standards in 1959.

Gardner was the president of the Optical Society of America in 1958. He was also noted for his work in the field of spectroscopy.

== Awards and honors ==
In 1954, he was awarded the Frederic Ives Medal by the Optical Society of America; he was made a fellow of the OSA in 1959. In 1955, he was awarded a fellowship of the Society of Imaging Science and Technology. The Gardner Inlet and the crater Gardner on the Moon are named after him.

== Bibliography ==
- "An optical system for reading the angular deflection of a mirror", Journal of the Optical Society of America, vol. 12, 1926.
- "The Optical Requirements of Airplane Mapping", Bureau of Standards Journal of Research, Vol. 8, 1932.
- "Observing an Eclipse in Asiatic Russia", National Geographic, February, 1937.
- "Validity of the Cosine-Fourth-Power law of Illumination", Journal of Research of the National Bureau of Standards, Vol. 39, September 1947.
- "Research and Development in Applied Optics and Optical Glass at the National Bureau of Standards; a Review and Bibliography", Washington Government Printing Office, 1949.
