= Newcomb (lunar crater) =

Crater on the Moon

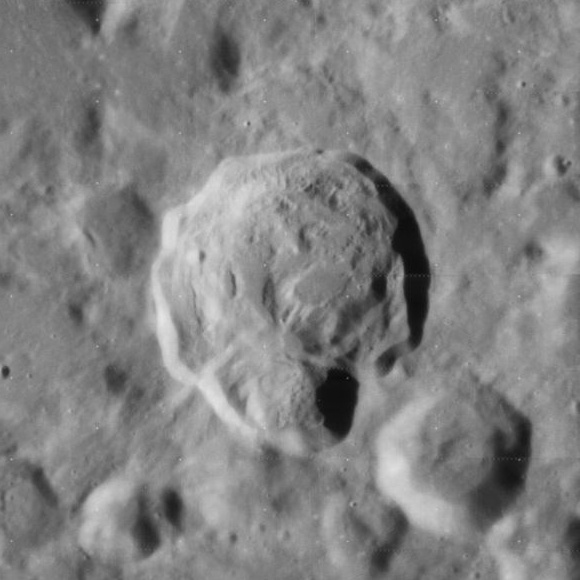
- Lunar Orbiter 4 image
- Coordinates: 29.9°N 43.8°E
- Diameter: 39 km
- Depth: 2.2 km
- Colongitude: 317° at sunrise
- Eponym: Simon Newcomb

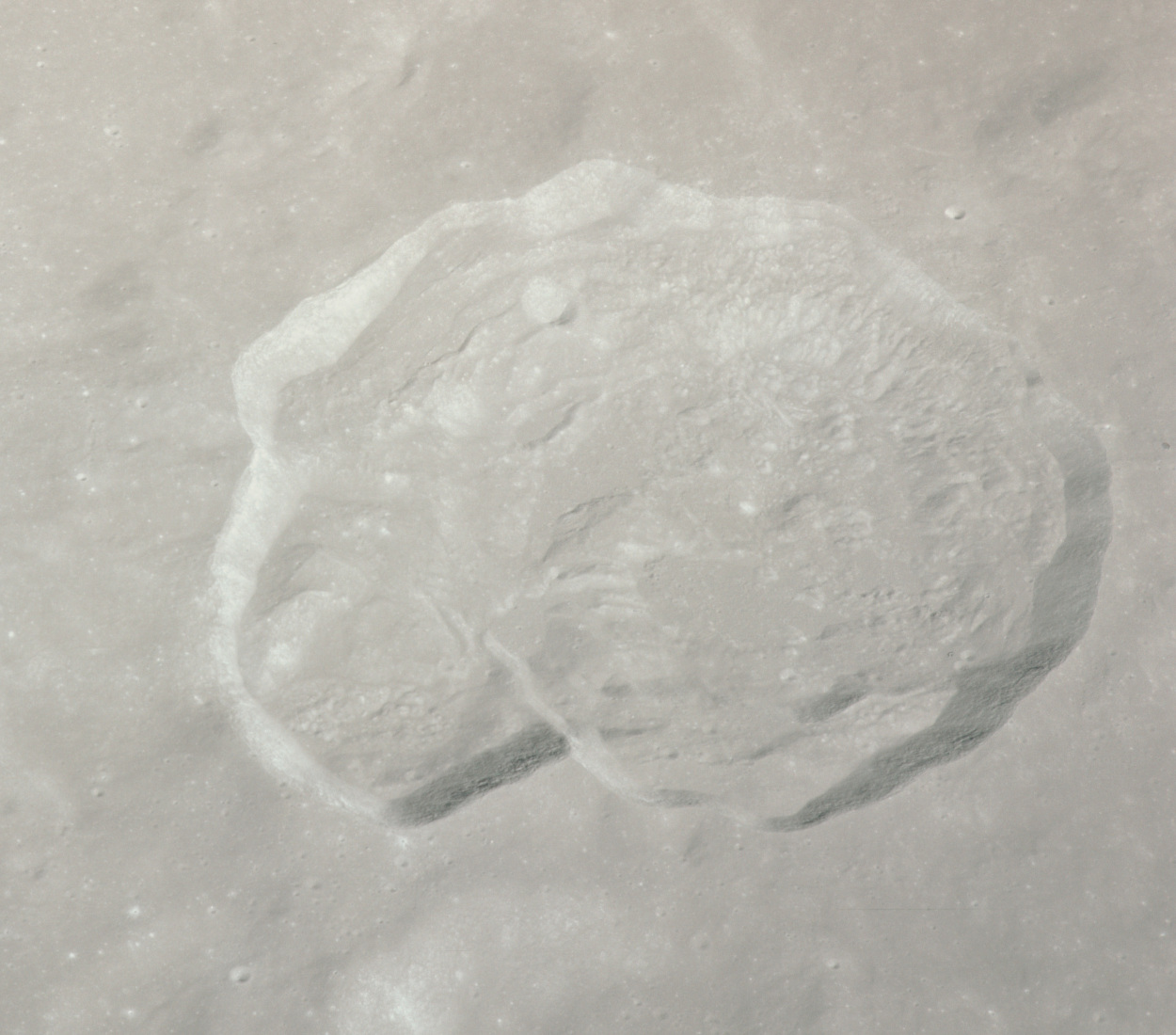
Oblique view facing north from Apollo 15

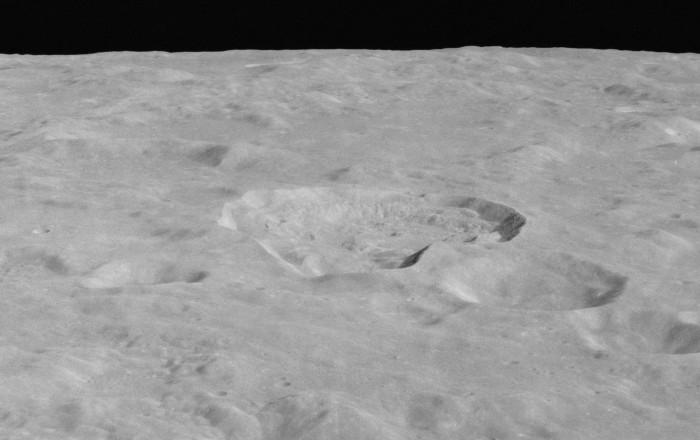
Oblique view facing north from Apollo 17

Newcomb is a lunar impact crater that is located in the rugged Montes Taurus mountain range, to the east of the Mare Serenitatis. It lies to the northeast of the prominent crater Römer, and north-northwest of Macrobius.

This formation dates to the Eratosthenian epoch of the lunar geologic timescale. It has a sharp-edged and somewhat irregular rim that appears polygonal more than circular. There are terraces along the inner sides, with some slumping along the northern and western inner edge. The south-southwestern part of the rim is overlaid by the smaller crater Newcomb A. The interior floor is uneven, particularly near the rim of Newcomb A. Just to the south-southeast of the crater is the satellite crater Newcomb J. This feature is named after the American astronomer Simon Newcomb.

== Satellite craters ==
By convention these features are identified on lunar maps by placing the letter on the side of the crater midpoint that is closest to Newcomb.

Newcomb	Latitude	Longitude	Diameter
A	29.4° N	43.5° E	19 km
B	28.4° N	45.6° E	23 km
C	29.1° N	45.3° E	29 km
F	31.4° N	42.5° E	28 km
G	28.2° N	44.6° E	16 km
H	28.9° N	42.4° E	12 km
J	28.7° N	44.3° E	23 km
Q	30.3° N	42.8° E	14 km

== See also ==
- Asteroid 855 Newcombia
- Newcomb (Martian crater)
