= Sinus Amoris =

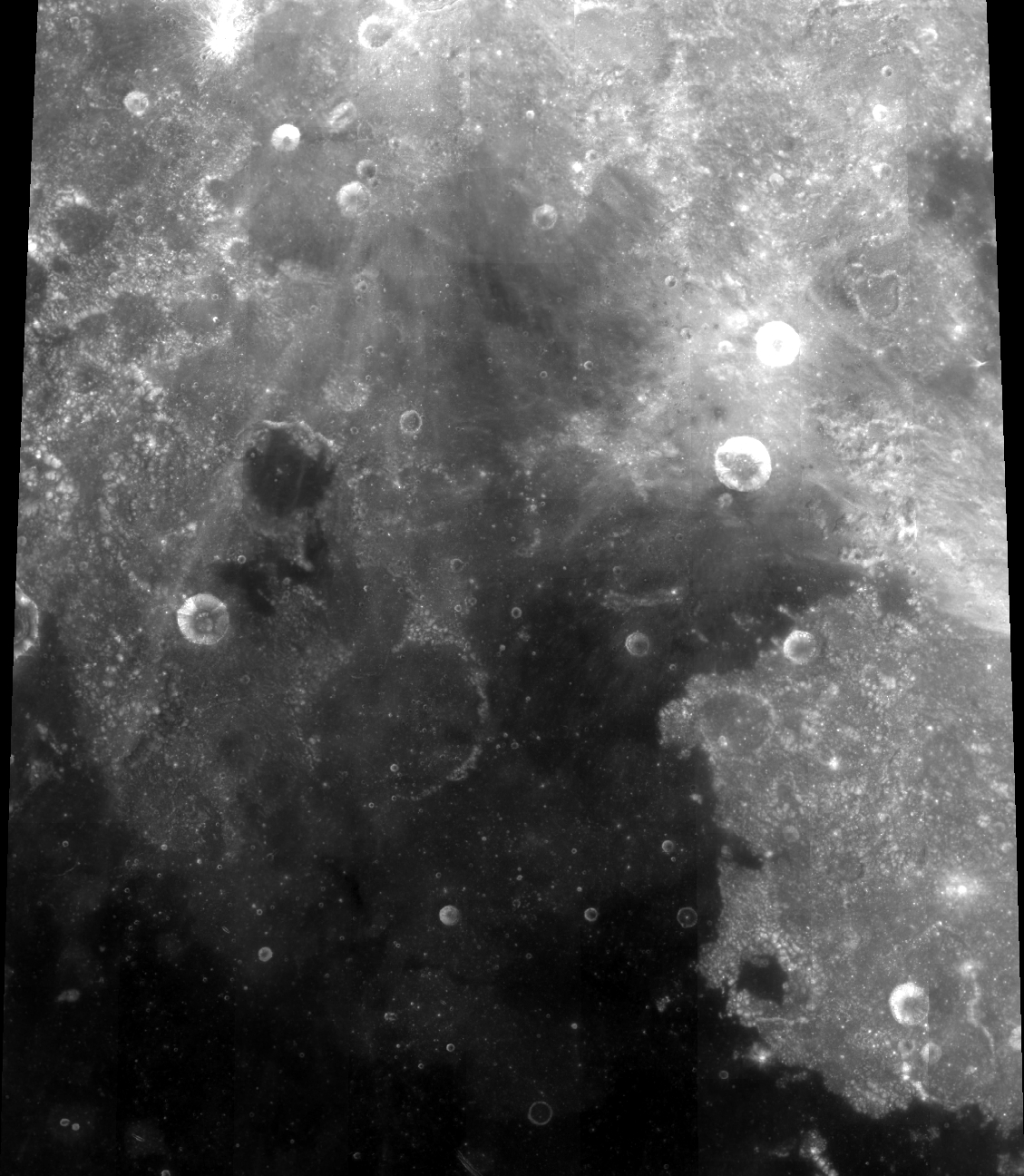
- Clementine mosaic
- Coordinates: 19.9°N 37.3°E
- Diameter: 190 km
- Eponym: Bay of Love

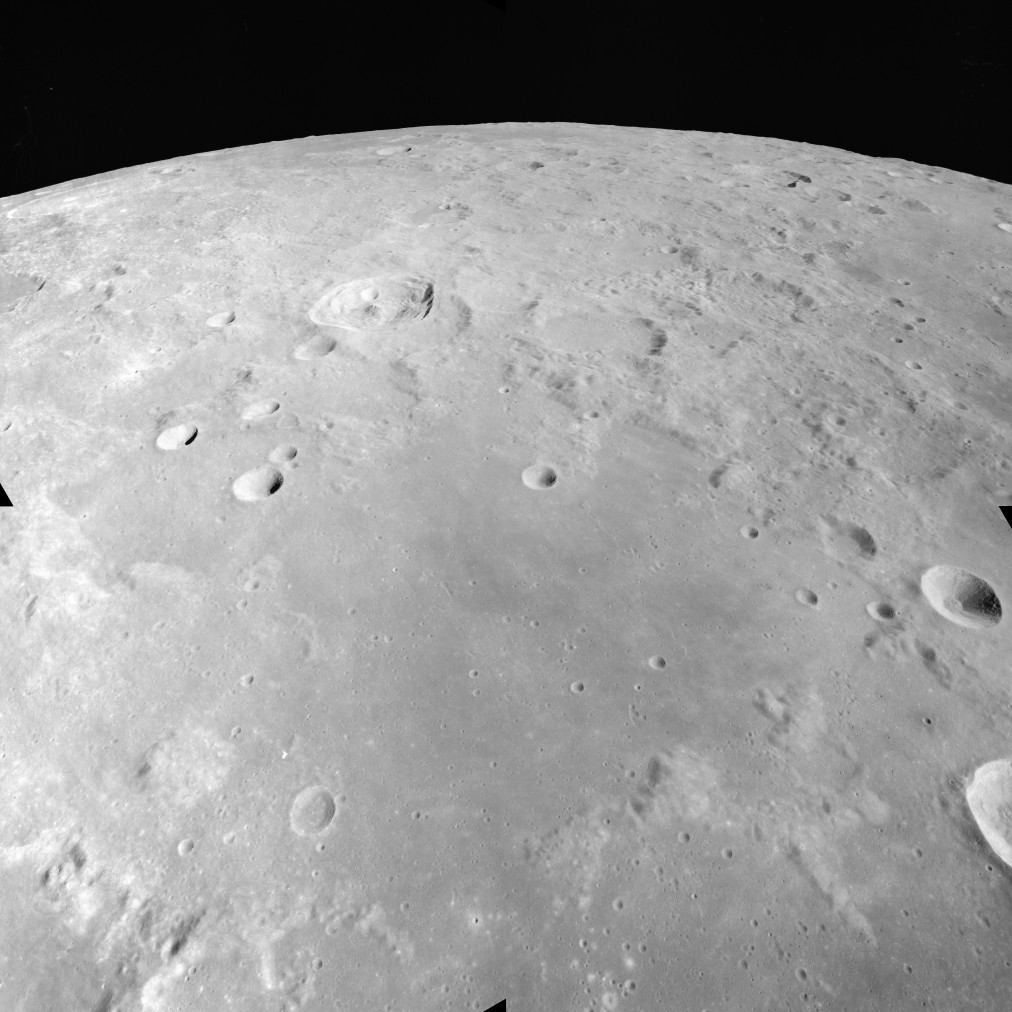
Apollo 17 image of northern Sinus Amoris, with Römer above left of center.

Sinus Amoris /ˈsaɪnəs əˈmɔːrɪs/ (Latin sinus amōris "Bay of Love") extends northward from the northeast end of the Mare Tranquillitatis. It is located at selenographic coordinates 19.9° N, 37.3° E, and lies within a diameter of 190 km. To the north of the bay are the jumbled Montes Taurus peaks.

Near the southern end of the bay where it outlets into the Mare Tranquillitatis lies the crater Theophrastus. Along the western side is the flooded crater Maraldi and Mons Maraldi. Bordering the east side of the bay are the craters Carmichael and Hill. There are some low ridges in the central part of the bay, but otherwise it is relatively featureless.

At the southern egress where the bay joins the mare lies Mons Esam, a minor rise that lies among several small lunar domes.
