= Theophrastus (crater) =

Crater on the Moon

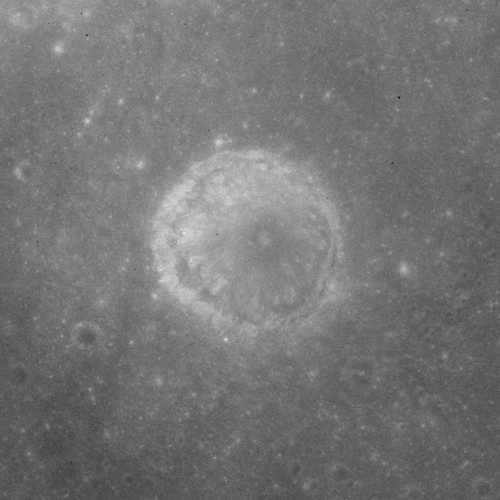
- Apollo 15 Mapping Camera image
- Coordinates: 17.46°N 39.06°E
- Diameter: 8.03 km (4.99 mi)
- Depth: 1.7 km (1.1 mi)
- Colongitude: 293° at sunrise
- Eponym: Theophrastus

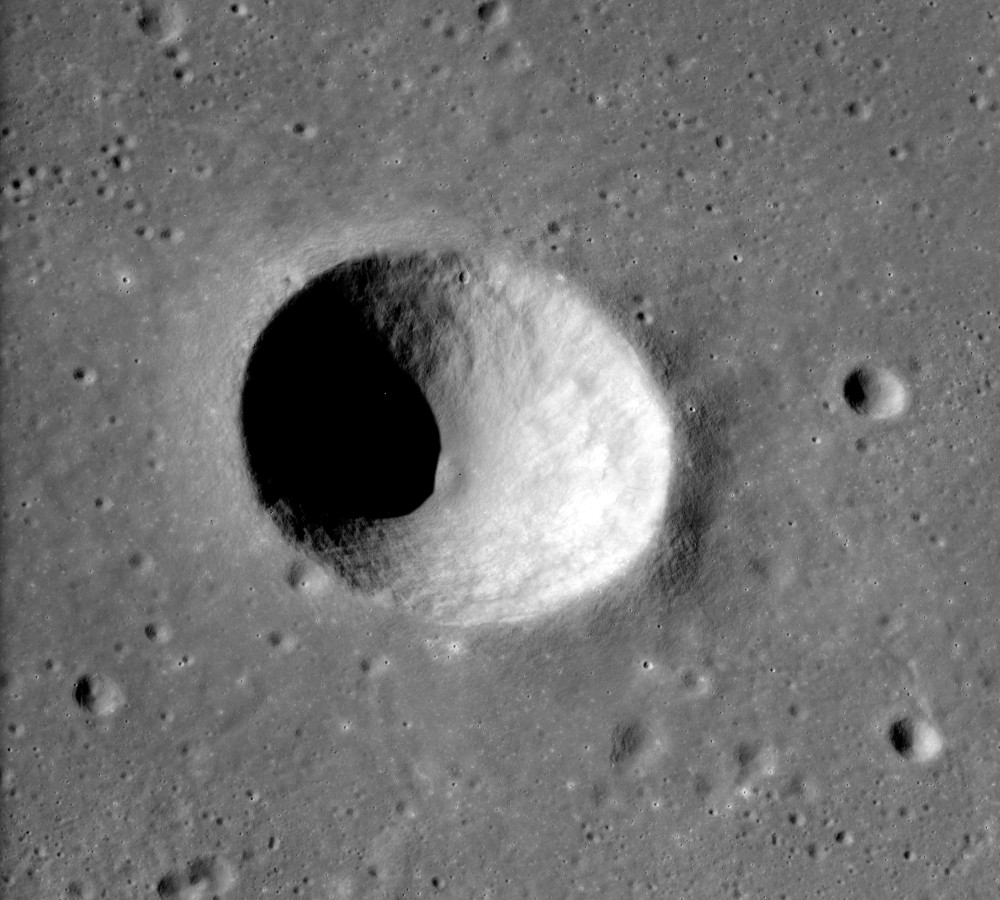
Oblique view looking south from Apollo 17

Theophrastus is a small lunar impact crater at the southern part of the Sinus Amoris, a bay at the northeast part of the Mare Tranquillitatis. It was named after ancient Greek philosopher Theophrastus in 1973. It lies to the southeast of the lava-flooded crater Maraldi, and was designated Maraldi M until the IAU gave it its current name. Just to the southeast of Theophrastus is the flooded Franz.

This is a circular crater, with inner walls that slope down to the midpoint and a rim that rises slightly above the surrounding lunar mare. The crater has nearly the same low albedo as the nearby surface. It has no other distinctive features, and is not significantly eroded.
