= Fabbroni (crater) =

Lunar crater

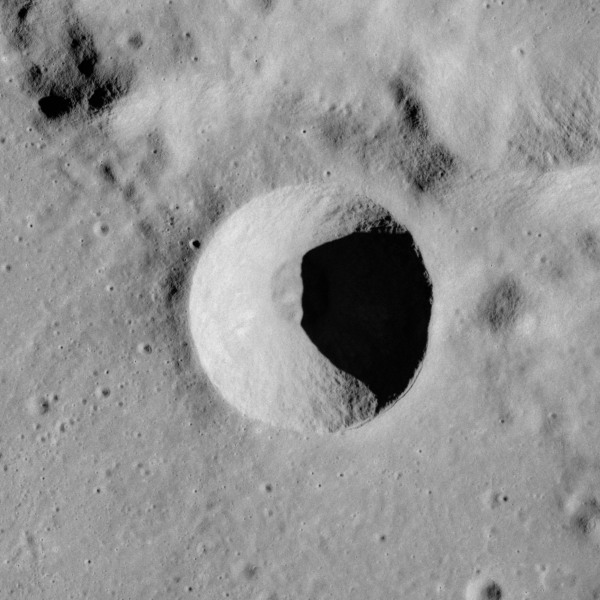
- Apollo 17 image
- Coordinates: 18.7°N 29.2°E
- Diameter: 10.55 km (6.56 mi)
- Depth: 2.1 km (1.3 mi)
- Colongitude: 331° at sunrise
- Eponym: Giovanni Fabbroni

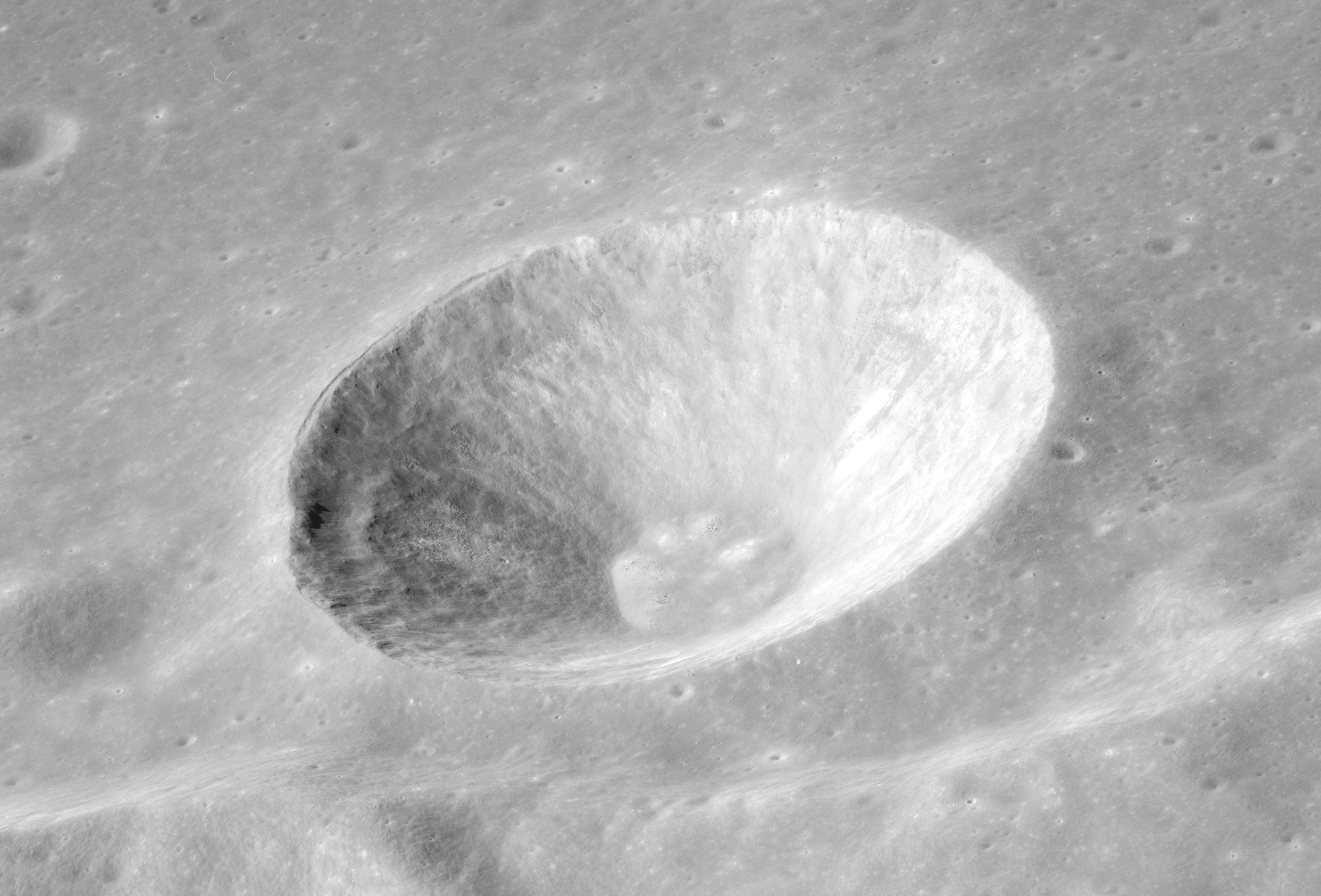
Oblique view facing south from Apollo 15

Fabbroni is a small lunar impact crater that lies along the northern edge of the Mare Tranquillitatis, at the eastern edge of the gap where the lunar mare joins Mare Serenitatis to the north. To the southeast is the crater Vitruvius. This is a circular crater with a conical interior formed by the inner walls gradually sloping down to the tiny floor at the midpoint. The northern rim of this crater lies along the southeastern flanks of the peak Mons Argaeus.

This formation is named after the Italian economist, chemist and naturalist Giovanni Fabbroni (1752-1822). Its designation was officially adopted by the International Astronomical Union in 1976. The feature was previously identified as Vitruvius E.
