= Vitruvius (crater) =

Crater on the Moon

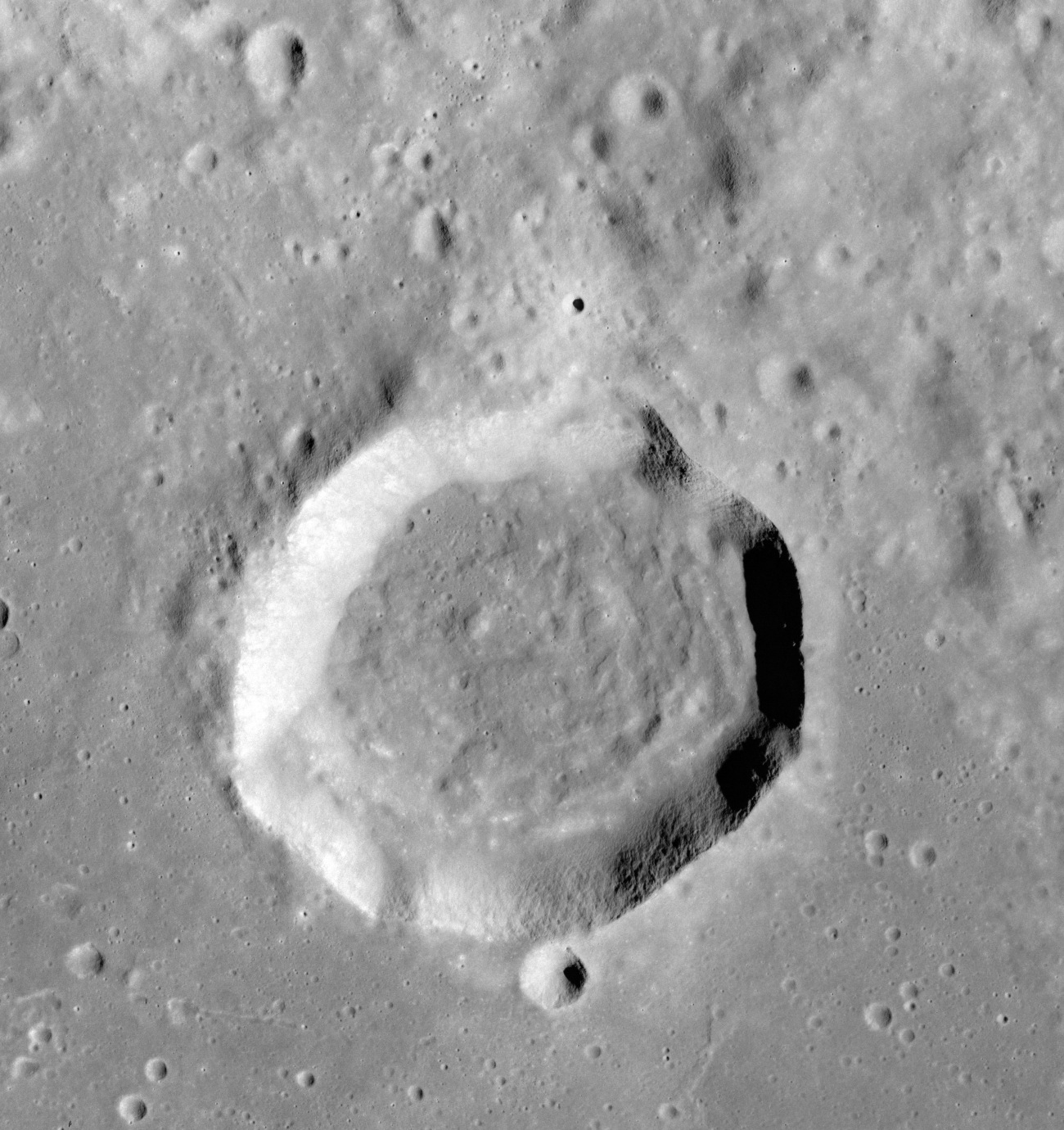
- Vitruvius from Apollo 17. NASA photo.
- Coordinates: 17.6°N 31.3°E
- Diameter: 30 km
- Depth: 1.88 km
- Colongitude: 329° at sunrise
- Formation: Upper Imbrian
- Eponym: Marcus Vitruvius Pollio

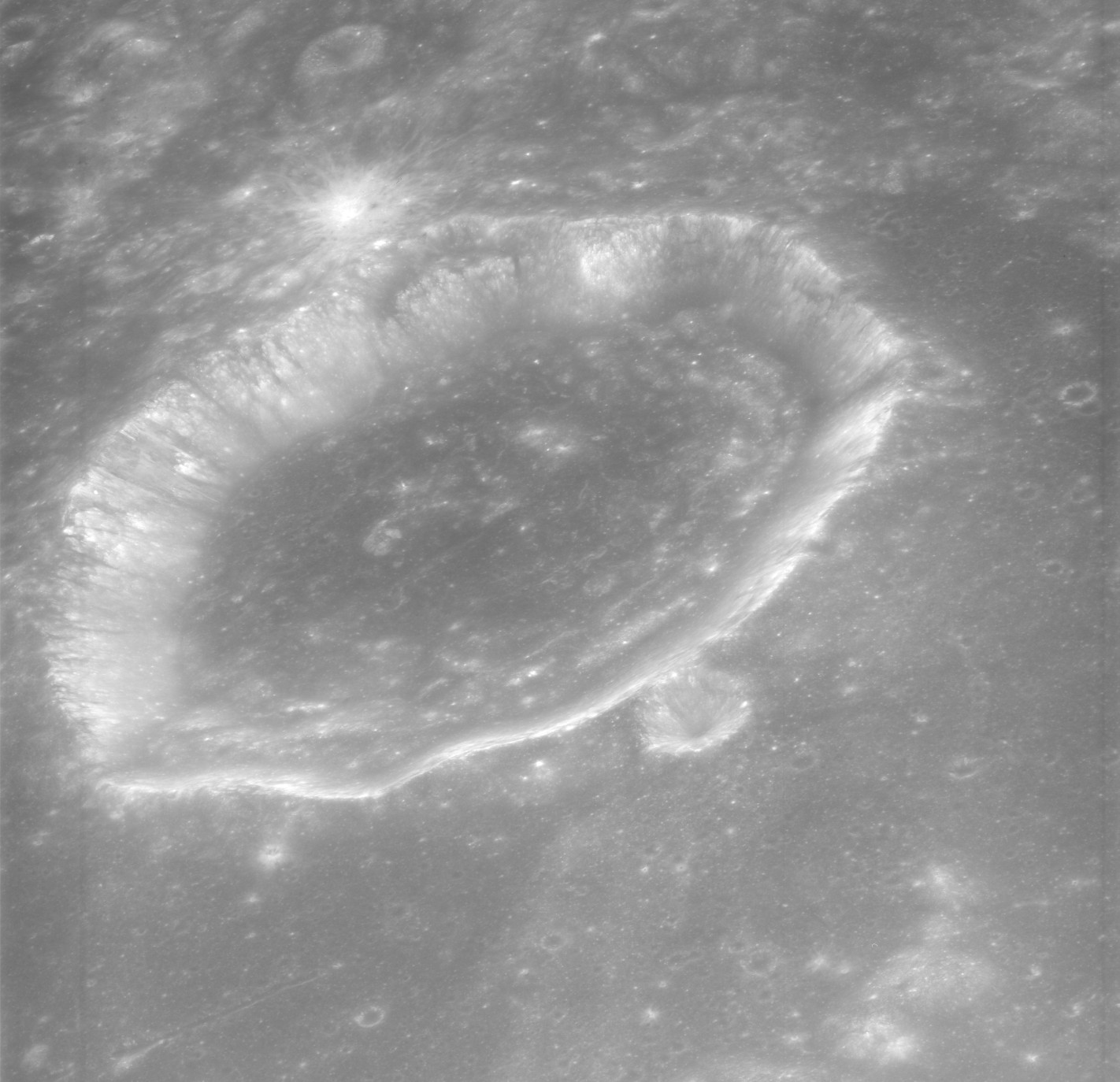
Oblique view of Vitruvius from Apollo 15 panoramic camera, facing north

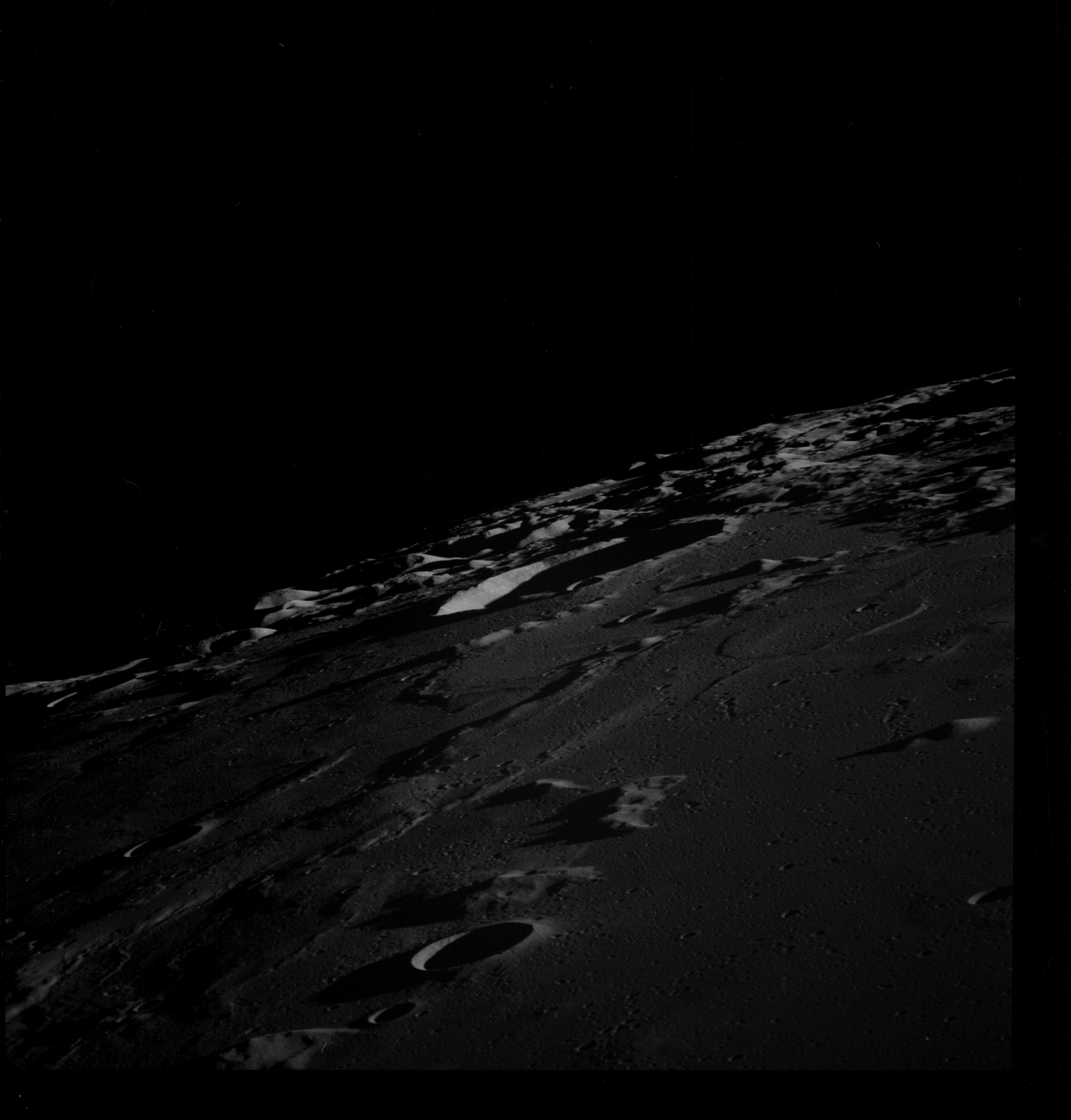
Oblique view of Vitruvius from Apollo 8, at the lunar terminator, with the Montes Taurus in the background.

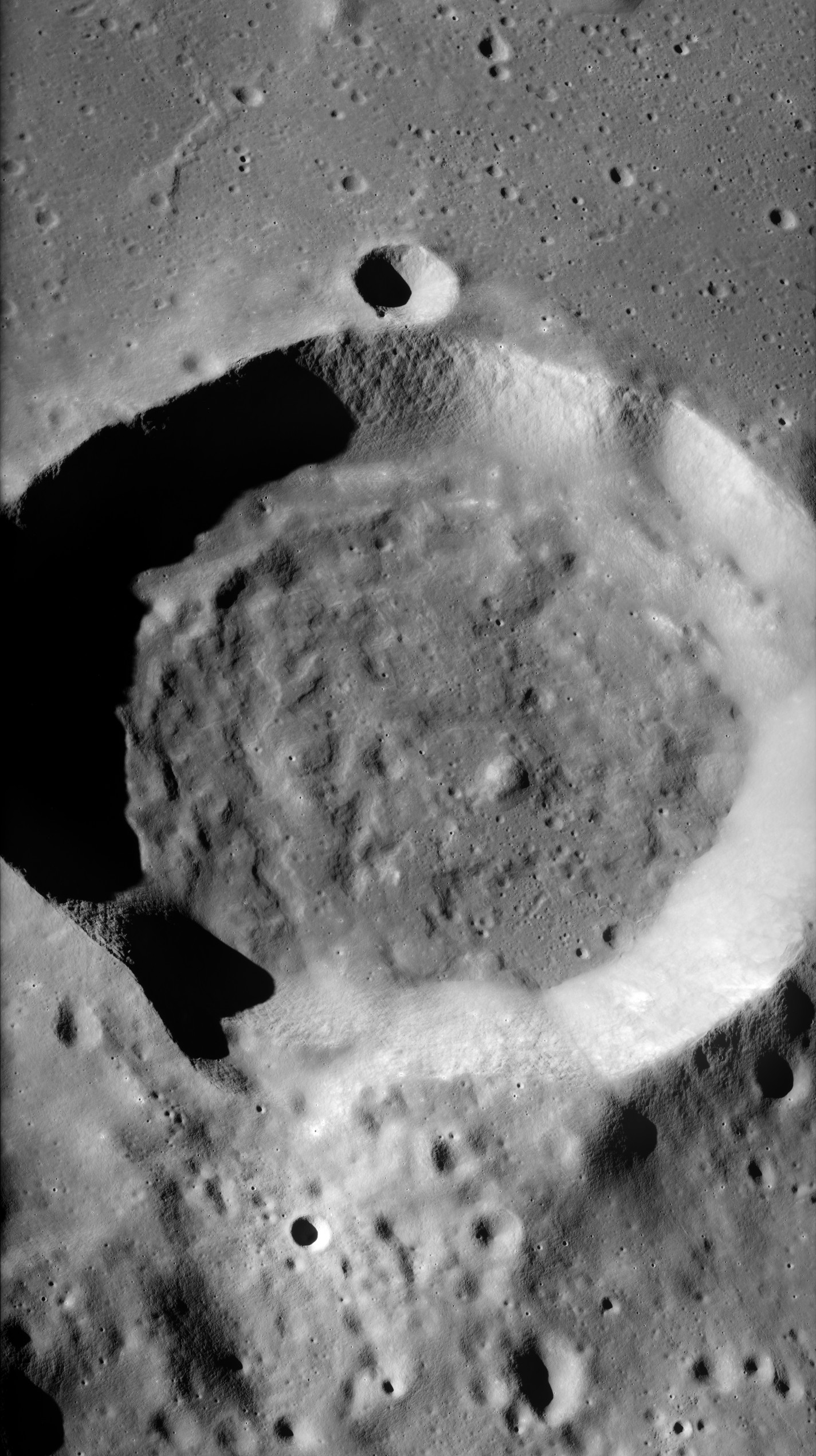
Oblique view of Vitruvius from Apollo 17 panoramic camera, facing south

Vitruvius is a small lunar impact crater that lies on the northern edge of the Mare Tranquillitatis. To the east is the crater Gardner, and to the northeast is Fabbroni. To the north-northwest is the elongated Mons Vitruvius mountain, and beyond is the valley where the Apollo 17 mission landed.

On the lunar geologic timescale, Vitruvius dates to the Upper (Late) Imbrian age. T. W. Webb describes Vitruvius as having a very dark interior. The rim of Vitruvius is somewhat circular, but the sides are uneven to the north and east. The rim is highest to the northwest. The interior floor is uneven, with some low rises in the southwest. A small crater is attached to southern outer rim. The surroundings grow more rugged to the north of the crater.

The crater was named after the ancient Roman engineer and architect Vitruvius.

== Satellite craters ==
By convention, these features are identified on lunar maps by placing the letter on the side of the crater midpoint that is closest to Vitruvius.

| Vitruvius | Latitude | Longitude | Diameter |
|---|---|---|---|
| B | 16.4° N | 33.0° E | 18 km |
| G | 13.9° N | 34.6° E | 6 km |
| H | 16.4° N | 33.9° E | 22 km |
| L | 19.0° N | 30.7° E | 6 km |
| M | 16.1° N | 31.5° E | 5 km |
| T | 17.1° N | 33.2° E | 15 km |

The following craters have been renamed by the IAU.

- Vitruvius A — See Gardner (crater).
- Vitruvius E — See Fabbroni (crater).

Vitruvius G is named El Greco on Lunar Topographic Orthophotomap LTO-61A1 Cajal, but this name was not approved by the IAU.
