= Giuseppe Bencivenni Pelli =

Italian civil servant and essayist

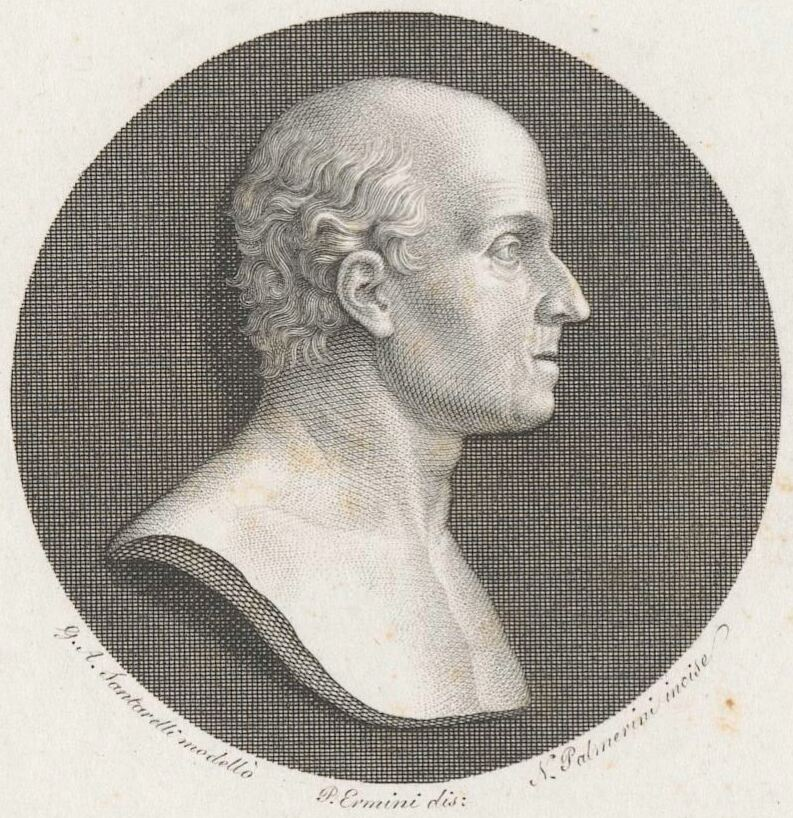
- Giuseppe Bencivenni Pelli
- Born: 1729; Florence, Grand Duchy of Tuscany
- Died: 31 July 1808 (aged 78–79); Florence, Grand Duchy of Tuscany
- Education: University of Pisa
- Occupations: Writer; Intellectual; Civil Servant; Diarist
- Writing career
- Language: Italian
- Period: 18th century
- Genres: Treatise; satire
- Notable works: Nuovi dialoghi dei morti Efemeridi
- Literary movement: Enlightenment

Giuseppe Bencivenni Pelli or Giuseppe Pelli Bencivenni (1729 - 31 July 1808) was an Italian civil servant and essayist. Born and dying in Florence, he served as director of the Uffizi Gallery from 1775 to 1793. He was the last member of a Florentine patrician family.

== Life ==
Orphaned early in life, he studied law at the University of Pisa but did not gain his doctorate. In 1758 he joined the Secretariat of State of the Grand Duchy of Tuscany. A supporter of the Tuscan Enlightenment, he wrote several books, essays and dissertations on art and culture. In the 1770s, he replaced the scholar Giovanni Lami as the editor of the erudite Novelle letterarie journal of Florence. He also wrote the 80-volume Efemeridi, a collection of diaries offering an incredible fresco of Florentine society between 1750 and 1799. He died in Florence.

== Works ==
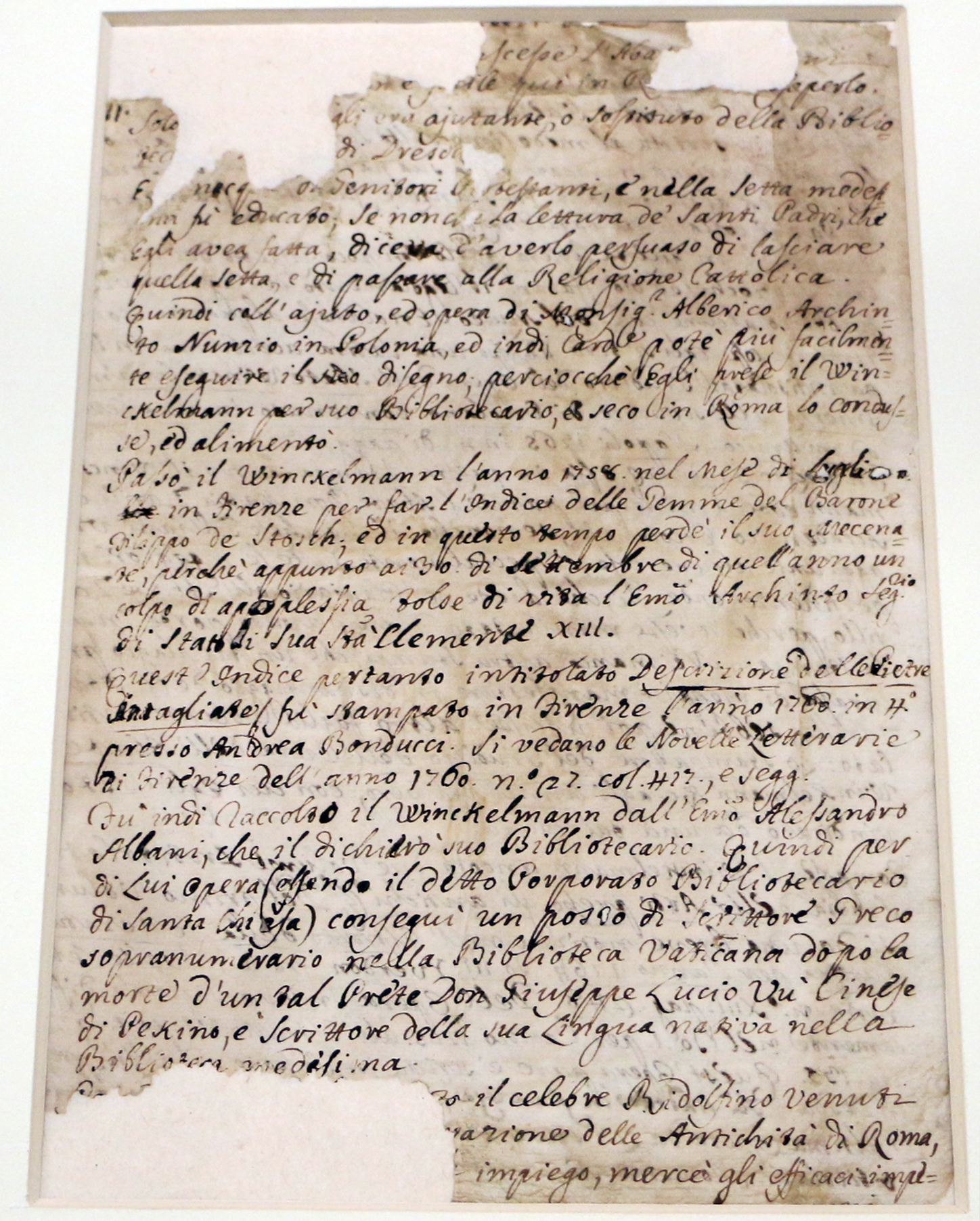
Manupscript by Giuseppe Bencivenni Pelli

- Efemeridi, Florence, 1759-1808 - preserved in the Biblioteca nazionale centrale di Firenze.
- Memorie per servire alla vita di Dante Alighieri ed alla storia della sua famiglia, Venice, Zatta, 1759.
- Nuovi dialoghi dei morti, Florence, 1770.
- Saggio Istorico della Real Galleria di Firenze, Florence, 1779.
- Catalogo delle pitture della Regia Galleria, Florence, 1779.
- Sbozzo di una dissertazione sopra la pena di morte, Florence, 1760-1761 - preserved in the Archivio di Stato di Firenze (Archivio Pelli Bencivenni, cartella 13 inserto 170)

== Bibliography ==
- (in French) Philippe Audegean, Le plus ancien programme de l'abolitionnisme italien: le Discorso della pena di morte de Giuseppe Pelli (1760-1761), in La peine de mort, edited by Luigi Delia and Fabrice Hoarau, CORPUS, revue de philosophie, 62 (2012), pp. 135–156.
- (in Italian) Silvia Capecchi, Scrittura e coscienza autobiografica nel diario di Giuseppe Pelli, Roma: Edizioni di Storia e Letteratura, 2006.
- (in Italian) Miriam Fileti Mazza, Bruna M. Tomasello, Galleria degli Uffizi 1775-1792. Un laboratorio culturale per Giuseppe Pelli Bencivenni, Modena: Franco Cosimo Editore, 2003.
- (in Italian) Miriam Fileti Mazza, Bruna M. Tomasello, Catalogo delle pitture della Regia Galleria compilato da Giuseppe Bencivenni già Pelli. Gli Uffizi alla fine del Settecento, 2004.
- Zapperi, Roberto (1966). "Bencivenni Pelli, Giuseppe". Dizionario Biografico degli Italiani (in Italian). Vol. 8: Bellucci–Beregan. Rome: Istituto dell'Enciclopedia Italiana. pp. 219–222. ISBN 978-88-12-00032-6.
