= Giovanni Domenico Maraldi =

Italian-born astronomer

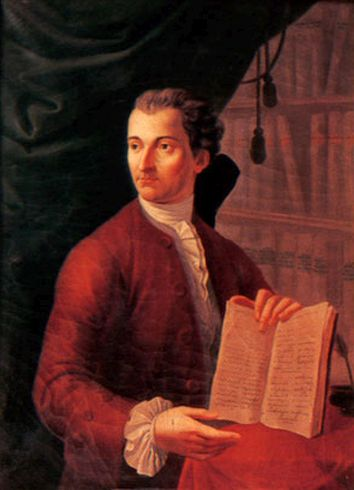
- Portrait of Giovanni Domenico Maraldi
- Born: 17 March 1709; Perinaldo, Duchy of Savoy
- Died: 14 November 1788 (aged 79); Perinaldo, Kingdom of Sardinia
- Education: University of Pisa
- Occupations: Astronomer; Physicist

Giovanni Domenico Maraldi (French: Jean-Dominique Maraldi; 17 April 1709 – 14 November 1788) was an Italian-born astronomer, nephew of Giacomo F. Maraldi.

== Biography ==
Born at Perinaldo, Republic of Genoa, Maraldi came to Paris in 1727 and became a member of the French Academy of Sciences in 1731. There, while observing Comet De Chéseaux with Jacques Cassini in 1746, he discovered two "nebulous stars", which later turned out to be globular clusters M15 and M2. Maraldi retired to Perinaldo, Italy in 1772. He was posthumously honored, along with his uncle, by the naming of lunar crater Maraldi in 1935.
