= Gardner (crater) =

Crater on the Moon

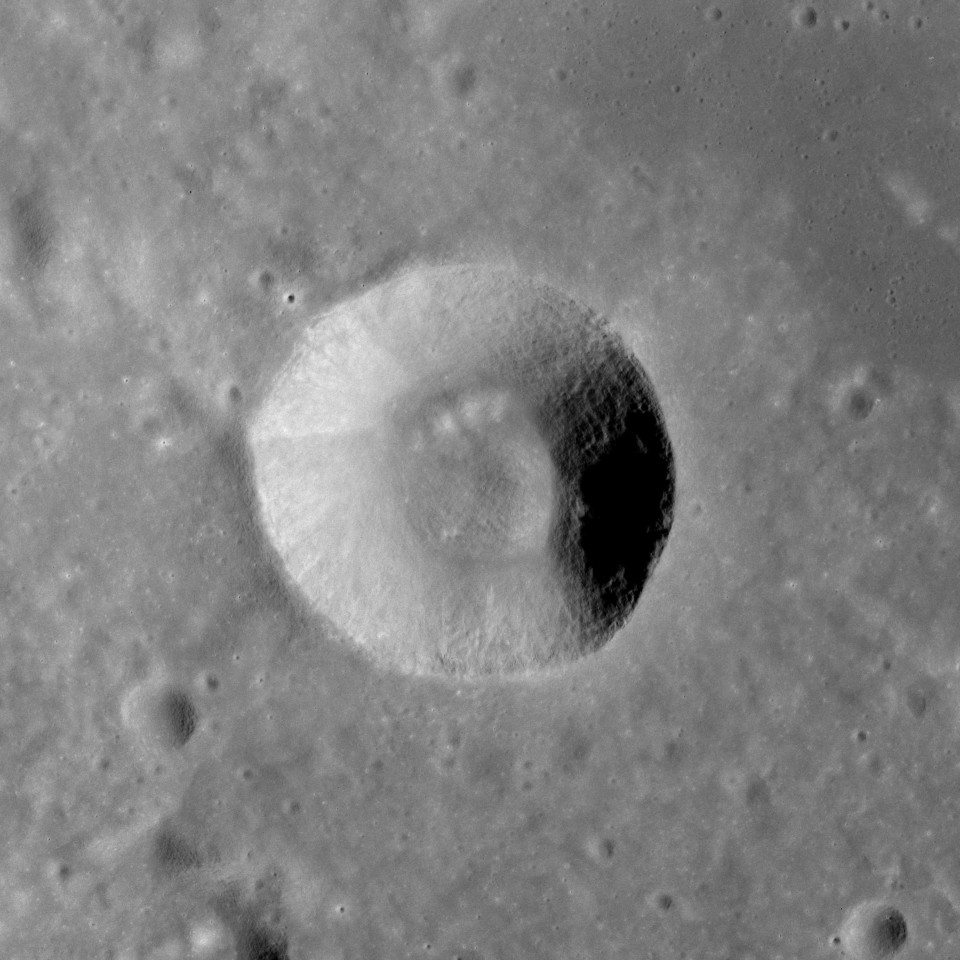
- Apollo 17 Mapping Camera image
- Coordinates: 17.7°N 33.8°E
- Diameter: 17.62 km (10.95 mi)
- Depth: 3.0 km (1.9 mi)
- Colongitude: 327° at sunrise
- Eponym: Irvine C. Gardner

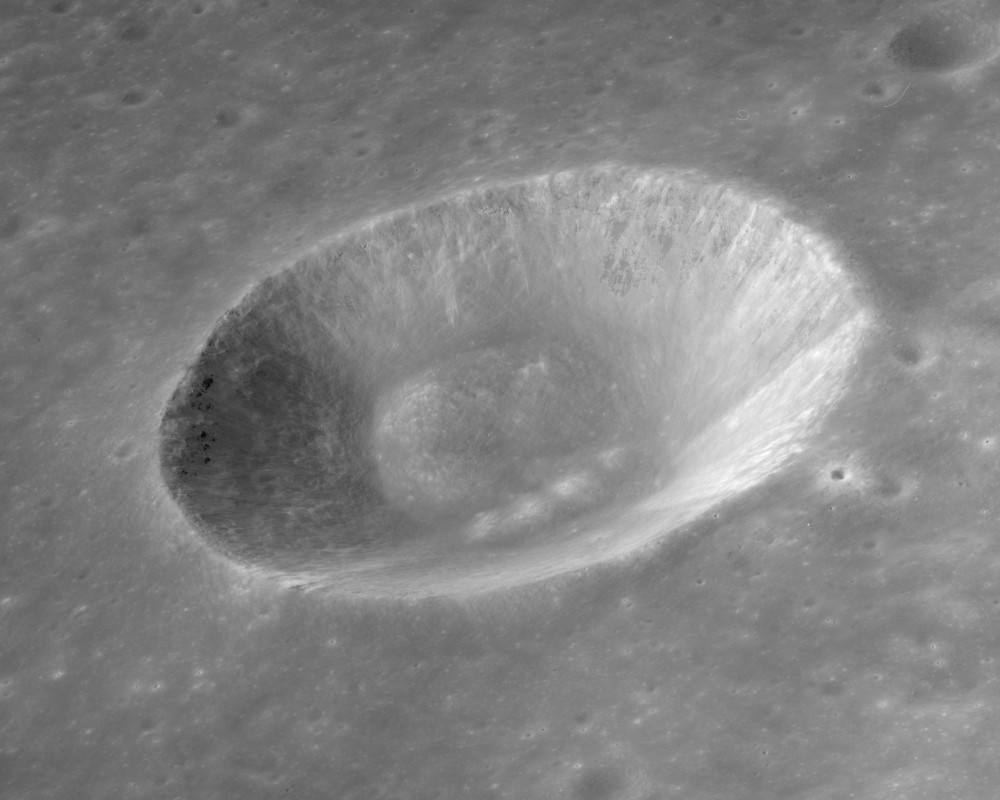
Oblique view from Apollo 15

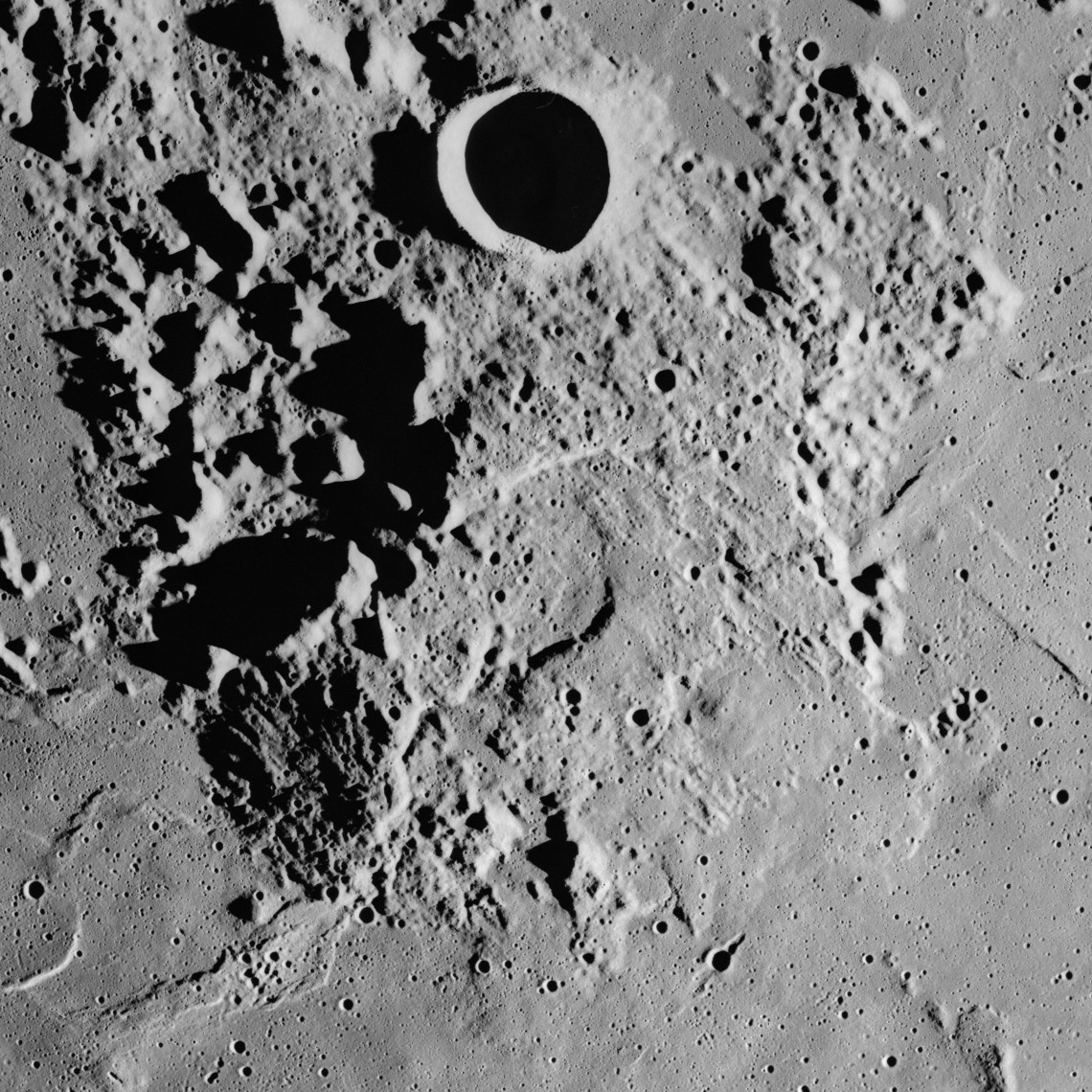
The Gardner Megadome, from Apollo 17

Gardner is a small lunar impact crater in the northeast part of the Moon. It lies due east of the crater Vitruvius, in a section of rough terrain north of the Mare Tranquillitatis. To the northeast of Gardner is the larger crater Maraldi.

Gardner is a circular crater with sloping inner walls and an interior floor that occupies about half the total crater diameter. The southern half of the floor has a slight rise before reaching the inner wall. The crater is not significantly eroded, and the outer rim is relatively sharp and well-defined. The most distinctive feature is a row of four rounded hills along the northern floor of the crater.

To the south is an elevated area unofficially known as the Gardner Megadome. The region forms a volcanic complex that includes domes and rilles, as well as features such as massifs, scarps, and a suspected fault. In the vicinity are satellite craters including Vitruvius B, H, and T, and Maraldi D.

The gardner crater is named after an American physicist Irvine Clifton Gardner (1889-1972). Its designation was officially adopted by the International Astronomical Union in 1976. Gardner was previously designated Vitruvius A.
