= Giovanni Fabbroni =

Italian scientist (1752–1822)

Giovanni Valentino Mattia Fabbroni
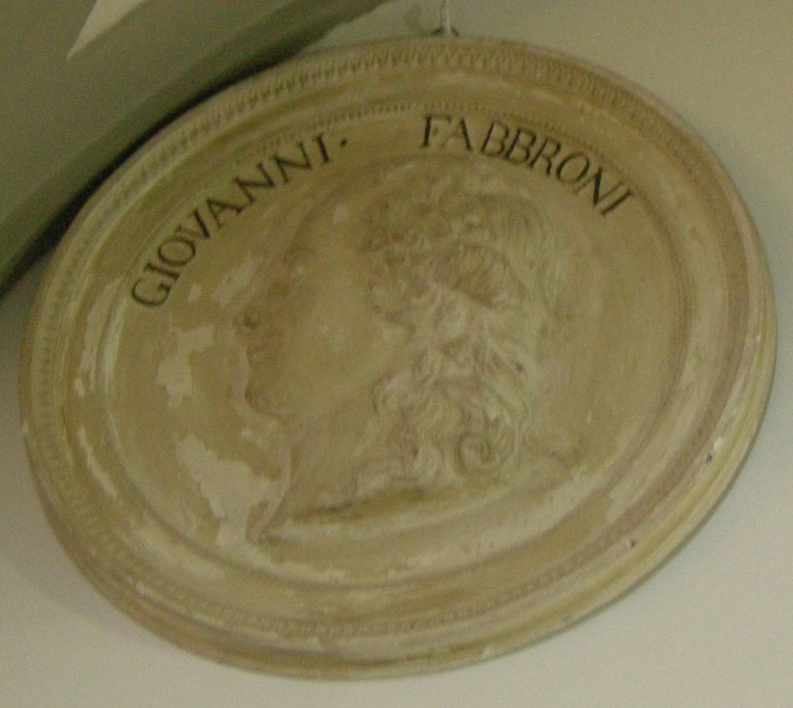
- Born: February 13, 1752; Florence, Grand Duchy of Tuscany
- Died: December 17, 1822 (aged 70); Pisa, Italy
- Spouse: Teresa Ciamagnini Fabbroni
- Awards: Fabbroni crater on the Moon is named after him
- Scientific career
- Fields: Naturalist, economist, agronomist, chemist

Giovanni Valentino Mattia Fabbroni (13 February 1752 – 17 December 1822) was an Italian naturalist, economist, agronomist and chemist.

== Biography ==
Giovanni Valentino Mattia Fabbroni was born in Florence, Italy, the son of Horace and Rosalinda Werner. His mother originated in Heidelberg.

In 1775 he collaborated with Felice Fontana in setting up the natural history museum in Florence (Museo di Fisica e Storia Naturale di Firenze). From 1777 to 1778 he wrote Reflexions sur l'état actuel de l'agricolture, a work which had a considerable impact on farming in Tuscany. He became a member of the Accademia dei Georgofili in 1783.

Fabbroni took on an increasing role in Florentine society as a proponent of economic liberalism and agrarian reform, and was a supporter of Leopold II. He continued to write scholarly works such as Dell'Antracite o carbone di cava detto volgarmente carbone fossile (1790).

During the Napoleonic era, Fabbroni was influential in the development of the metric system and in its introduction to Italy. He also carried out research into electrochemistry, particularly into Volta's pile. He died in Pisa, aged 70.

The crater Fabbroni on the Moon is named after him.

The library of the Museo Galileo detains most of the archival documents concerning Giovanni Fabbroni: the “Fondo Fabbroni”, and the “Carte Fabbroni”. This last consists of the many letters and notes concerning the Royal Museum of Physics and Natural History of Florence, which offer access to the various activities of study and research promoted by the institute, as well as its management. From many of these documents, which Fabbroni always kept in his private archive, one can clearly follow the conflict opposing him to Felice Fontana. Moreover, the archival fund offers a glimpse to the political and cultural life of Tuscany at a time of profound political and institutional changes, and a precious insight to the scientific context of the 18th and 19th century.
