= Montes Taurus =

Mountainous region on the Moon

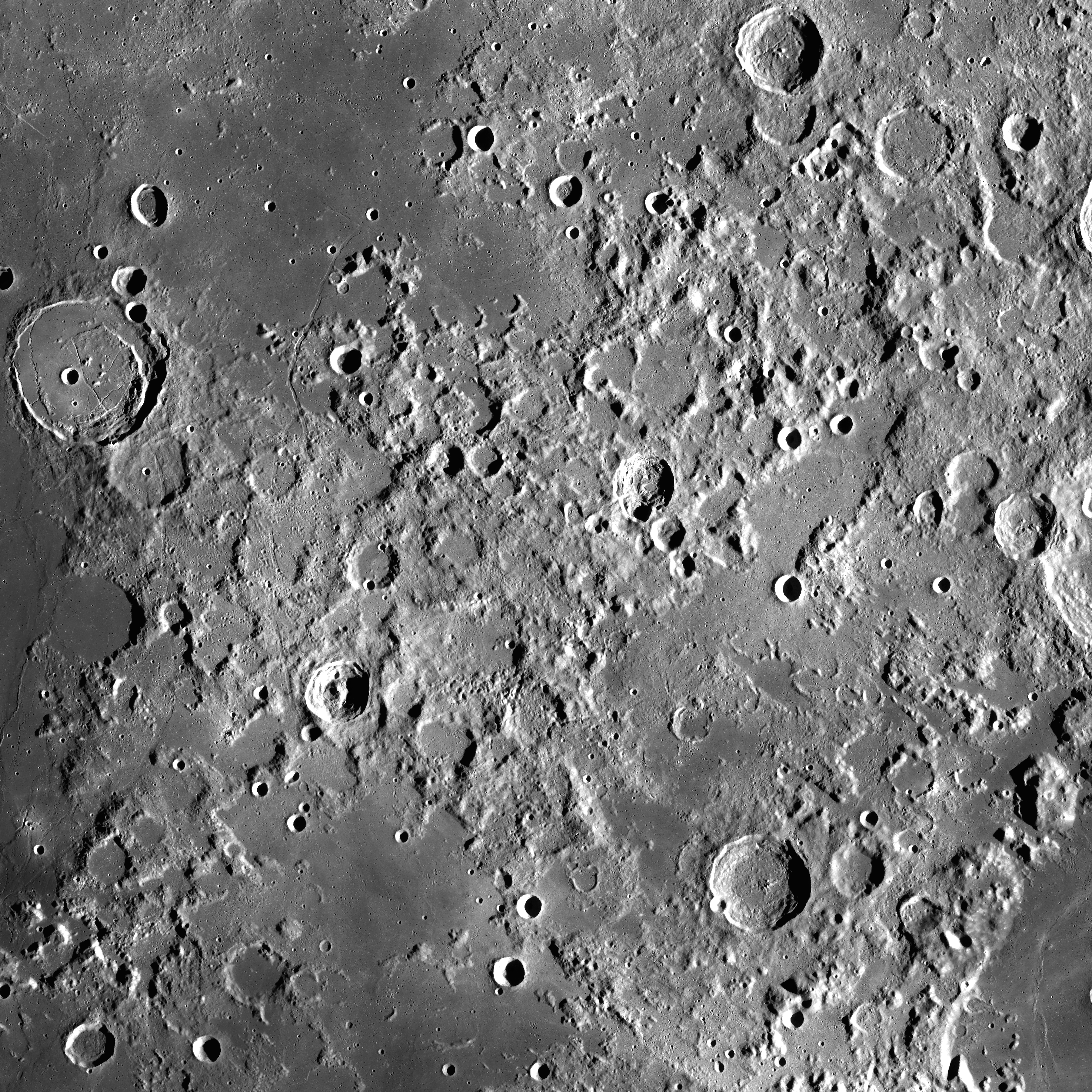
- Montes Taurus. Edge of Mare Serenitatis is seen in the left and edge of Mare Crisium in the lower right. Image width is 700 km.

Highest point
- Elevation: 2.1 km above mean level of lunar surface
- Listing: Lunar mountains
- Coordinates: 27.32°N 40.34°E

Naming
- English translation: Taurus Mountains
- Language of name: Latin

Geography
- Location: the Moon

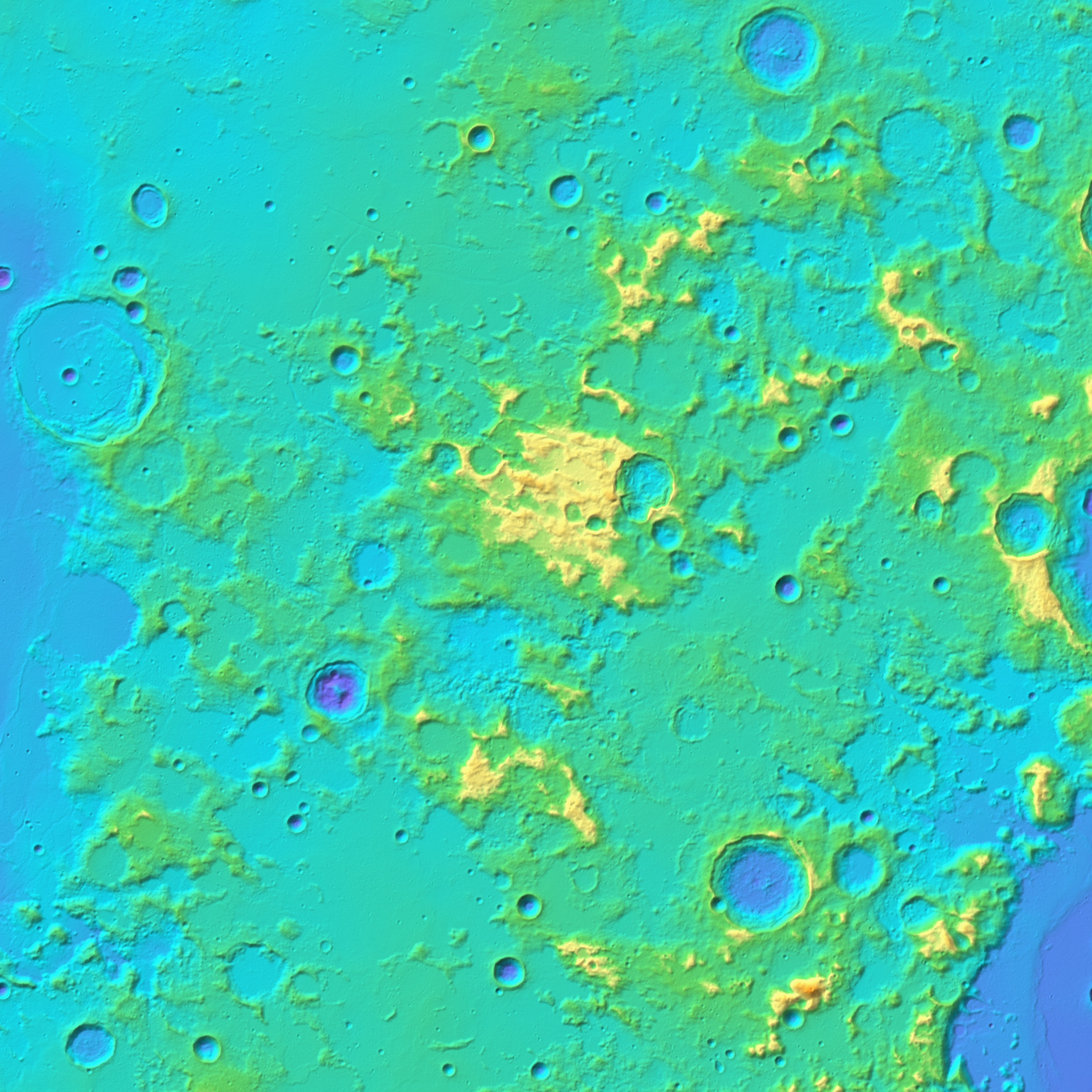
Elevation map (yellow is highlands and blue is lowlands)

Montes Taurus is a rugged, jumbled mountainous region on the Moon. It is located to the east of the Mare Serenitatis, in the northeastern quadrant of the Moon's near side. Coordinates of their center are 27.32°N 40.34°E, and their extent is about 170 km.

Montes Taurus are rather unimpressive and indistinct compared to other named lunar mountain systems. It is a broad hilly region without sharp borders. These mountains reach maximal height between craters Kirchhoff and Newcomb (4.9 km above Mare Serenitatis and 2.1 km above mean level of lunar surface).

A number of craters lie embedded within this range. At the southwestern edge of the region is the crater Römer, and Newcomb is located in the northeastern section. Several satellite craters also lie throughout the Montes Taurus. The southwestern edge of this region hosts Taurus–Littrow valley, the landing site of the crewed Apollo 17 mission.

== Name ==
The Montes Taurus are named after the Taurus Mountains in southern Turkey. This name appeared on the lunar map due to Johannes Hevelius, who used to name lunar features after terrestrial ones. But he assigned this name (in the form Mons Taurus) to a completely different feature — one of bright rays of crater Tycho. The item of this article was designated as Taurica Chersonnesus, because Hevelius tried to establish a correspondence between lunar regions and regions of vicinity of Mediterranean sea, and on his map this lunar region corresponded to Crimea (historically known as Tauris or Tauric Chersonese). Later lunar cartographers began to call it Montes Taurus, and in 1935 this name was adopted by International Astronomical Union.
