= Römer (crater) =

Crater on the Moon

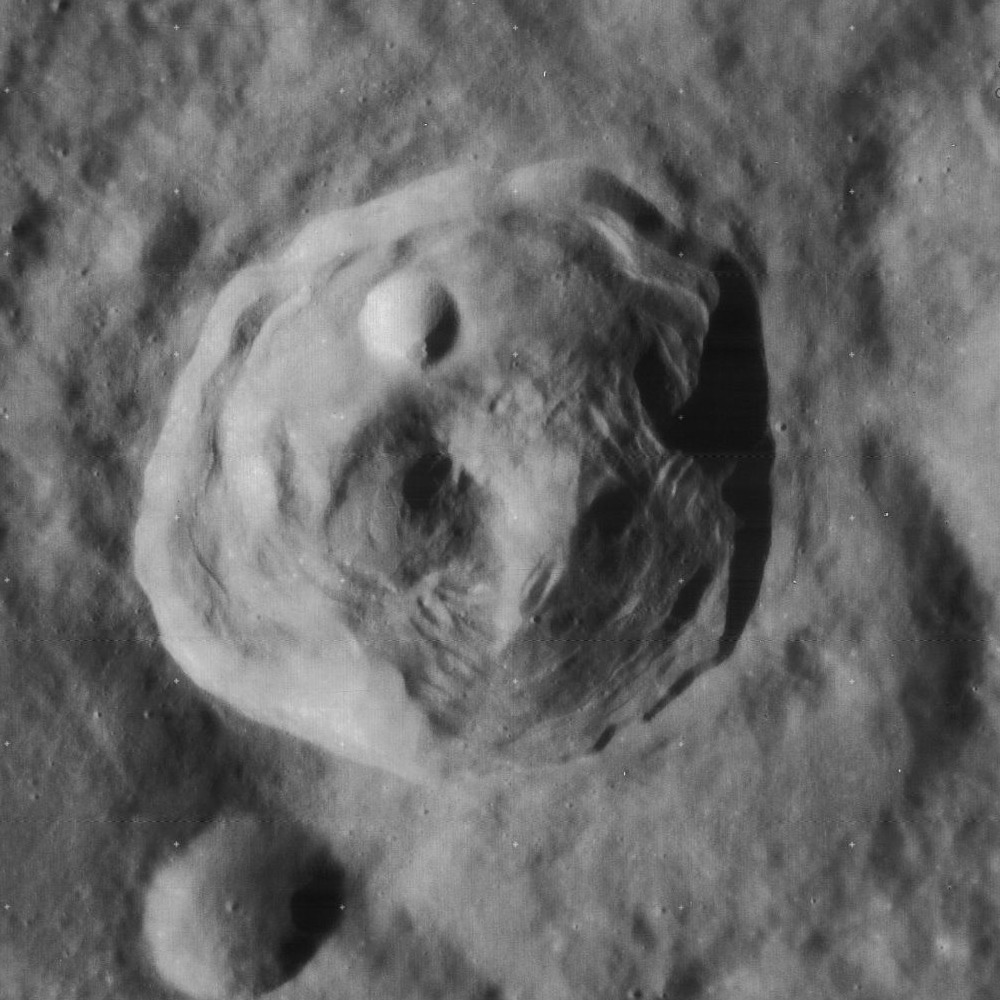
- Lunar Orbiter 4 image
- Coordinates: 25.4°N 36.4°E
- Diameter: 40 km
- Depth: 3.5 km
- Colongitude: 324° at sunrise
- Eponym: Ole Rømer

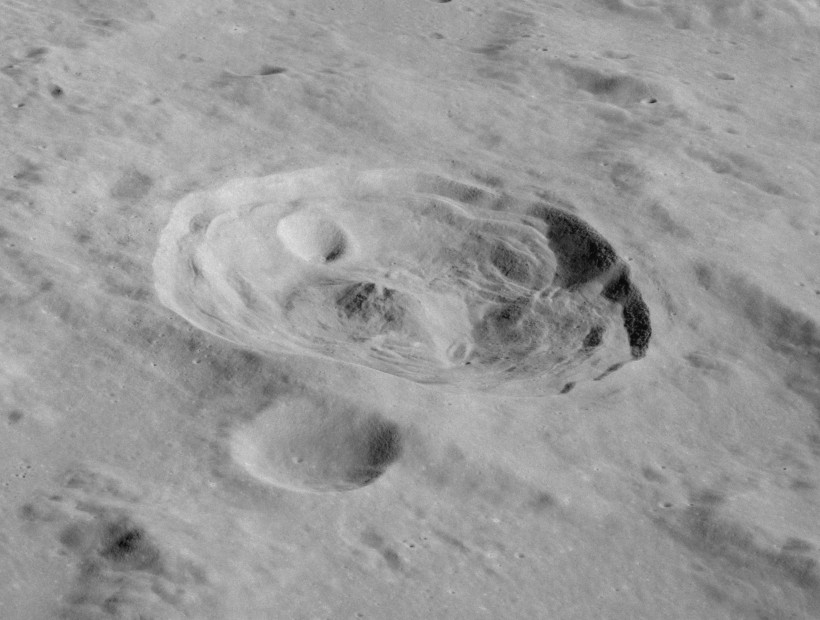
Oblique view of Römer from Apollo 17.

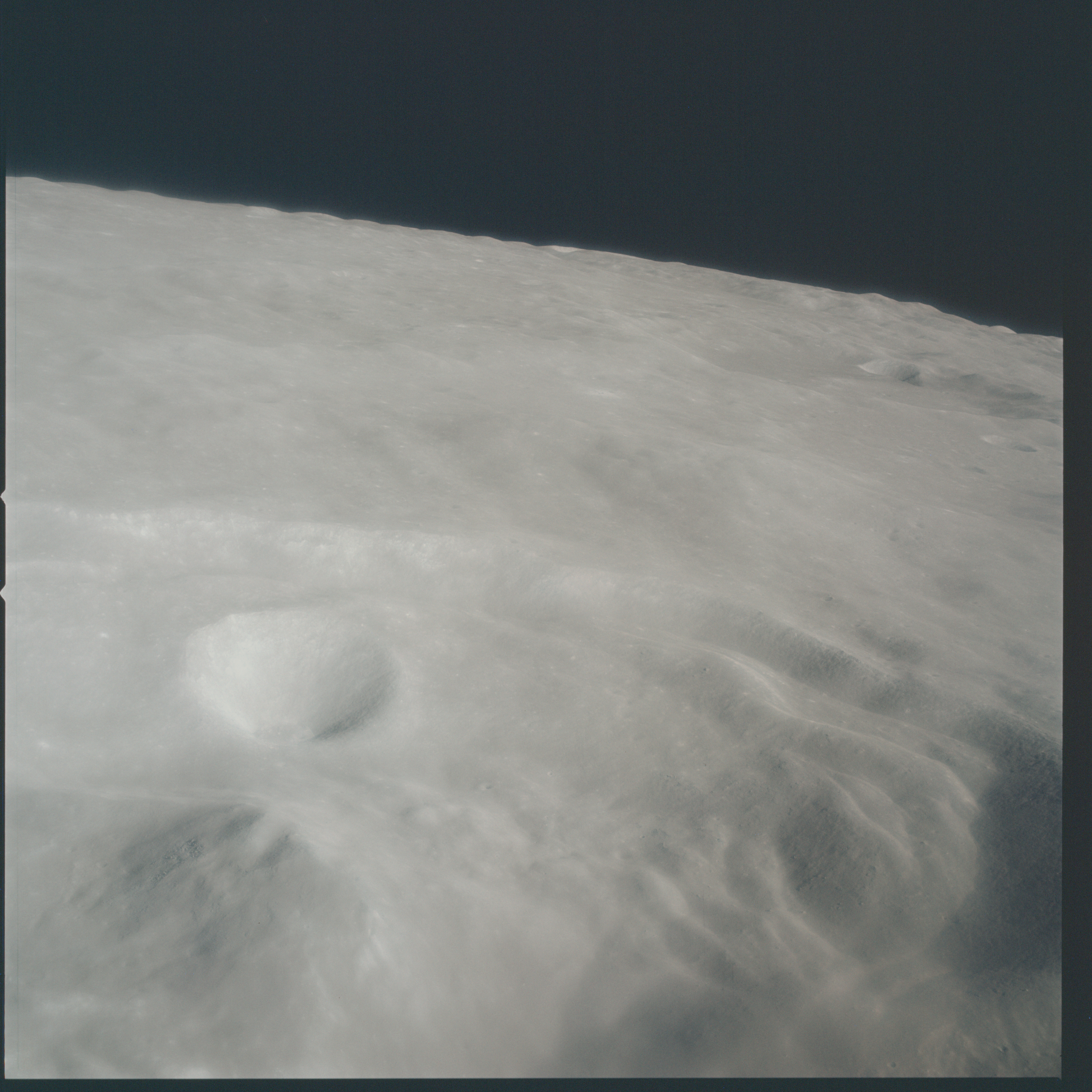
Apollo 15 captured this view as it flew over Römer at low altitude.

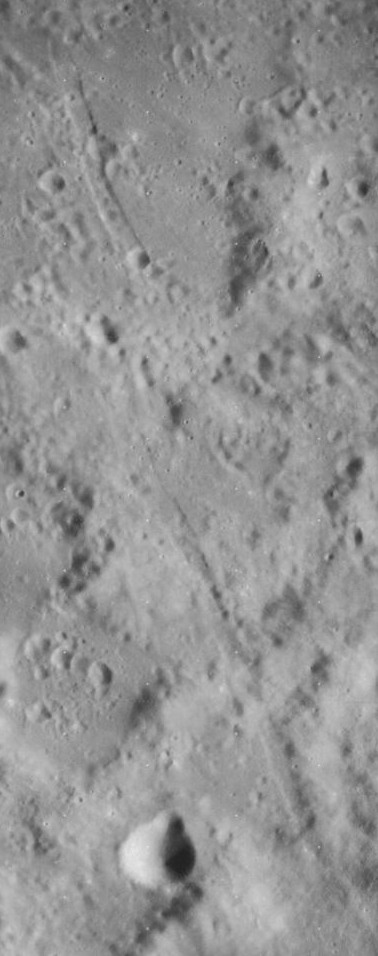
Lunar Orbiter 4 image of Rimae Römer

Römer is a lunar impact crater that is located to the north of the Sinus Amoris in the northeast section of the Moon. It was named after Danish astronomer Ole Rømer. It lies in the southwestern part of the mountainous region named the Montes Taurus. Satellite crater Römer A, north-northeast of Römer itself, was unofficially named as Atatürk by astronomer Hugh Percy Wilkins in his lunar map, possibly due to the fact that the Montes Taurus (or Toros Dağları in Turkish) are located in Turkey. This crater, Römer A, was called Stephanides by Félix Chemla Lamèch. To the west-northwest of Römer is the crater-bay Le Monnier, on the eastern edge of Mare Serenitatis.

The rim of Römer has relatively high walls with a terraced inner surface. There is a small craterlet on the north part of the floor, and a large central peak at the midpoint. Römer has a ray system, and due to these rays, it is mapped as part of the Copernican System.

To the northwest of the crater is a prominent system of rilles named the Rimae Römer. These follow a course to the north from the western rim of the crater, and have a combined length of about 110 kilometres.

== Satellite craters ==
By convention these features are identified on lunar maps by placing the letter on the side of the crater midpoint that is closest to Römer.

Römer	Latitude	Longitude	Diameter
A	28.1° N	37.1° E	35 km
B	28.6° N	38.2° E	20 km
C	27.7° N	37.0° E	8 km
D	24.5° N	35.8° E	13 km
E	28.5° N	39.2° E	31 km
F	27.1° N	37.2° E	22 km
G	26.8° N	36.2° E	14 km
H	25.9° N	35.7° E	6 km
J	22.4° N	37.9° E	8 km
M	25.3° N	34.6° E	10 km
N	25.3° N	38.0° E	26 km
P	26.5° N	39.6° E	61 km
R	24.2° N	34.6° E	42 km
S	24.9° N	36.8° E	44 km
T	23.6° N	36.1° E	47 km
U	24.3° N	39.1° E	28 km
V	24.5° N	38.6° E	28 km
W	26.4° N	40.4° E	7 km
X	24.3° N	40.1° E	22 km
Y	25.7° N	36.3° E	7 km
Z	24.1° N	36.9° E	12 km

The following craters have been renamed by the IAU.

- Römer K — See Franck (crater).
- Römer L — See Brewster (crater).

== Bright ray craterlet west-southwest of Römer ==
During full moon, a bright ray craterlet is discernible west-southwest of Römer. This ray craterlet never received an official letter designation or name. Its brightness is also noticeable on the photographic version of chart LAC 43 (page 86) in The Clementine Atlas of the Moon (Ben Bussey / Paul D. Spudis).
