= Mons Maraldi =

Mountain on the Moon

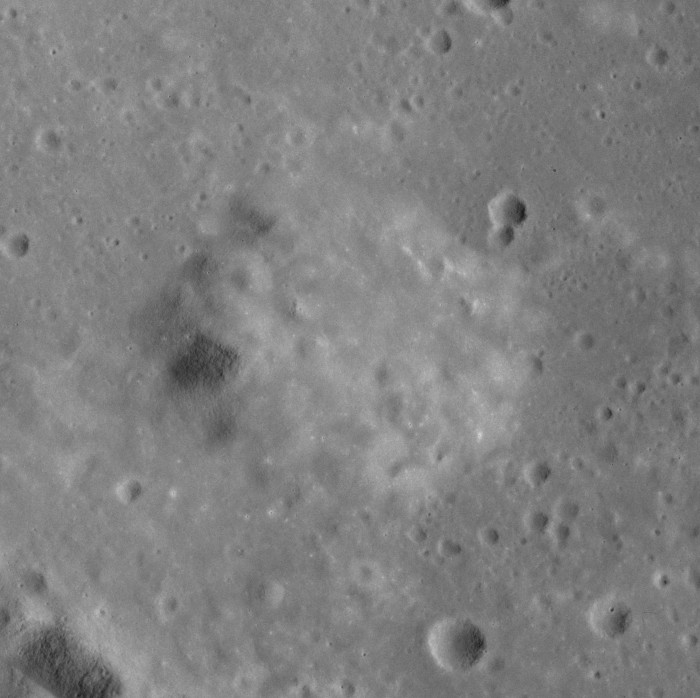
- Apollo 17 Mapping camera image

Highest point
- Elevation: 1.3 km
- Listing: Lunar mountains
- Coordinates: 20.3°N 35.3°E

Geography
- Location: the Moon

Mons Maraldi is a 1.3-kilometer-tall mountain on the Moon at 20.3° N, 35.3°E, covering an area about 15 kilometers in diameter. It is named after the nearby crater Maraldi.

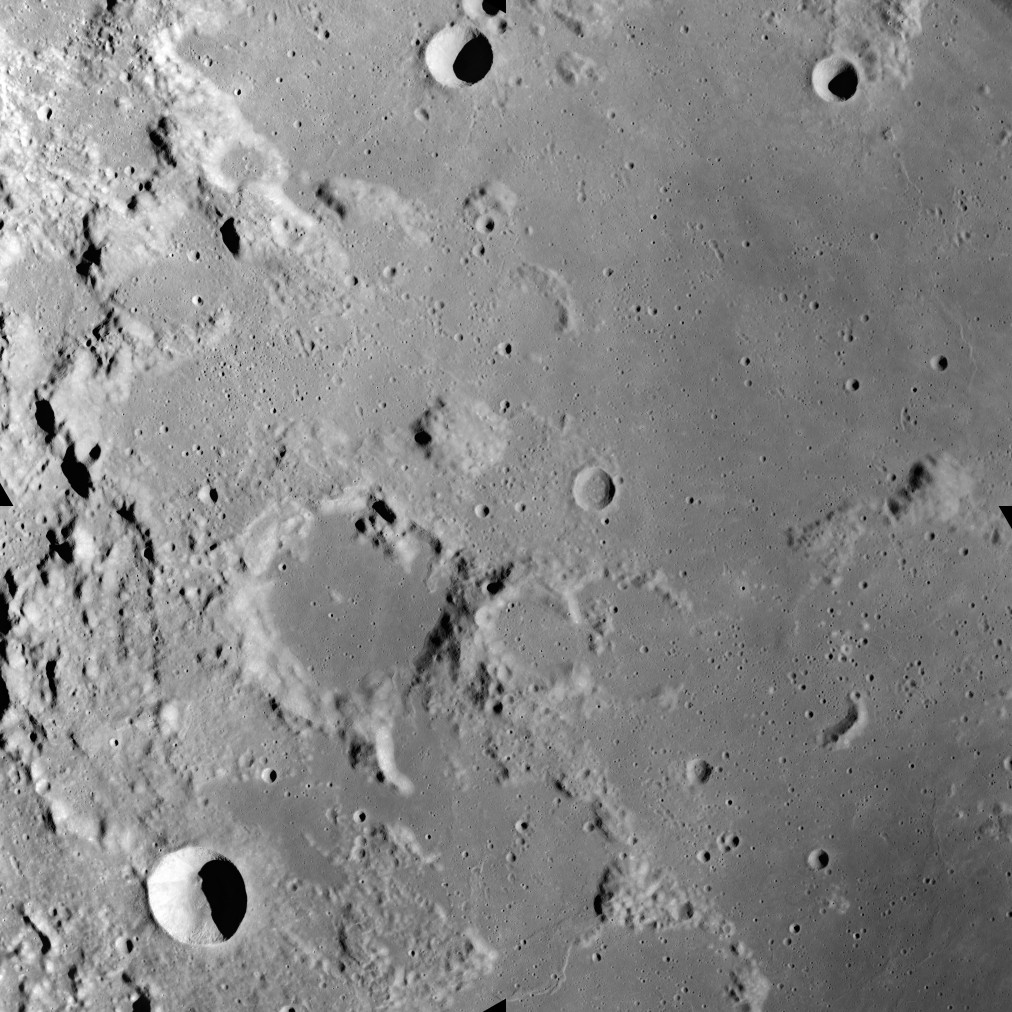
Context image showing the dome-like Mons Maraldi at center and the flooded crater Maraldi to the southwest from Apollo 17. NASA photo.

== See also ==
- List of mountains on the Moon
