= Giacomo F. Maraldi =

French-Italian astronomer and mathematician

Giacomo Filippo Maraldi (21 August 1665 – 1 December 1729) was a French-Italian astronomer and mathematician. His name is also given as Jacques Philippe Maraldi. Born in Perinaldo (modern Liguria) he was the nephew of Giovanni Cassini, and worked most of his life at the Paris Observatory (1687 – 1718). He also is the uncle of Jean-Dominique Maraldi.

He also recognized (in May 1724) that the corona visible during a solar eclipse belongs to the Sun not to the Moon, and he discovered R Hydrae as a variable star. He also helped with the survey based on the Paris Meridian.

In 1723 he also confirmed earlier (1715) discovery of his pupil Joseph-Nicolas Delisle of what is usually referred to as Poisson's spot, an observation that was unrecognized until its rediscovery in the early 19th century by Dominique Arago. At the time of Arago's discovery, Poisson's spot gave convincing evidence for the contested wave nature of light.

In mathematics he is most known for obtaining the angle in the rhombic dodecahedron shape in 1712, which is still called the Maraldi angle.

Craters on the Moon and Mars were named in his and his nephew's honor.
