= Milichius =

Milichius is the Latinized name under which the 16th-century German scholar Jacob Milich was known historically.

It can also refer to:

- Milichius (crater), a crater in the northern Mare Insularum on Earth's moon
- Milichius Pi, a lunar dome near Milichius crater
- Rima Milichius, a lunbar rille near Milichius crater
- Milichius, a mis-spelling of genus Meilichius in the handsome fungus beetle family
