= Hortensius (disambiguation) =

Hortensius can refer to:

- The ancient Roman gens (clan) Hortensia.
- Quintus Hortensius (dictator), Roman dictator in 287 BC.
- Quintus Hortensius Hortalus (114-50 BC), Roman orator.
- Hortensius (Cicero), a lost dialogue by Cicero from 45 BC, which Augustine of Hippo says (in Confessiones) turned him to the way of philosophy
- The Dutch astronomer Martin van den Hove (1605–1639), also known as Martinus Hortensius.
- Hortensius crater, on the Moon, which is named after this Dutch astronomer.
- Hortensius is the name of the steward in the opera La fille du régiment, by Gaetano Donizetti.
