= Beketov =

Beketov is a Russian male surname. Its feminine counterpart is Beketova. Notable people with the surname include:

- Aleksandr Beketov (born 1970), Russian épée fencer and Olympic gold medalist
- Andrey Beketov (1825–1902), Russian botanist
- Artyom Beketov (born 1984), Russian football player
- Mikhail Beketov (1958–2013), editor-in-chief of "Khimkinskaya Pravda", defender of the Khimki Forest
- Nikolay Beketov (1827–1911), Russian chemist
  - Beketov (crater), a lunar crater named after Nikolay Beketov
- Pyotr Beketov, 17th-century Russian explorer and voevoda of Siberian Cossacks
- Sofia Beketova (born 1948), Russian rower
- Vladimir Beketov

Other uses

- Arkhitektora Beketova (Kharkiv Metro), a metro station in Kharkiv, Ukraine
