= Sinas =

Sinas may refer to:

- Sinas (crater), crater on the Moon
- Debold Sinas (born 1965), Filipino police officer
- Georgios Sinas (1783–1856), Greek benefactor and diplomat
- Simon Sinas (1810-1876), Georgios' son, Greek benefactor and diplomat, after whom the Sinas crater is named

== See also ==
- Sina (disambiguation)
