= Beketov (crater) =

Lunar impact crater

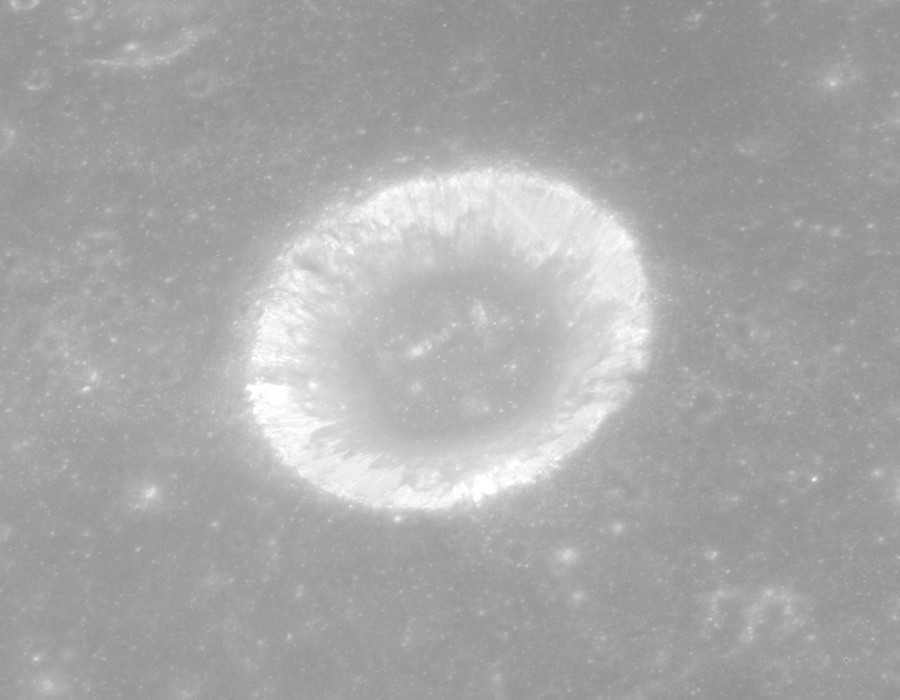
- Oblique Apollo 15 panoramic camera image
- Coordinates: 16.3°N 29.2°E
- Diameter: 8.30 km (5.16 mi)
- Depth: 1.0 km (0.62 mi)
- Colongitude: 331° at sunrise
- Eponym: Nikolay N. Beketov

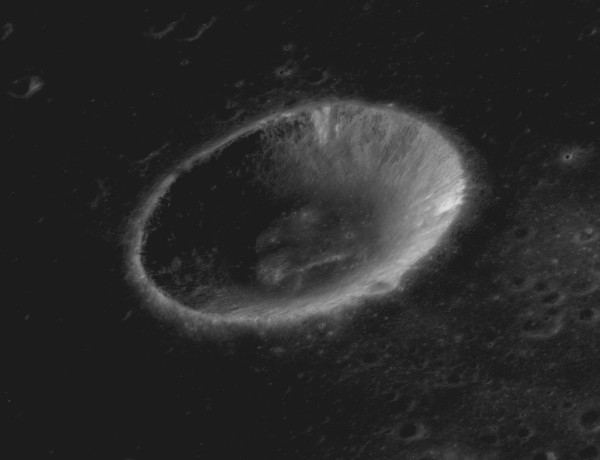
Apollo 17 panoramic camera image

Beketov is a small lunar impact crater that lies in the northern reaches of the Mare Tranquillitatis. It is a relatively fresh, cup-shaped feature with a circular rim and inner walls that slope down to a central floor. A pair of irregular lunar domes lie to the north. To the south is the ghost crater Jansen R. Northeast of Beketov, along the edge of the mare, is the crater Vitruvius.

This crater is named after Russian chemist Nikolay Beketov (1827–1911). It was previously designated Jansen C before this Beketov was formally adopted by the International Astronomical Union in 1976. The flooded crater Jansen lies to the south.
