= Cajal =

Cajal:

- Santiago Ramón y Cajal, Spanish histologist, physician, pathologist
- Fortún Garcés Cajal, medieval Spanish nobleman
- Nicolae Cajal (1919–2004), Romanian Jewish physician, academic, politician, philanthropist
- Cajal Institute, a neuroscience research center in Madrid, Spain.
- Cajal cells
  - Cajal–Retzius cell
  - Interstitial cell of Cajal (ICC)
- Cajal bodies (CBs)
- Cajal (crater), a tiny lunar impact crater
