= Sinas (crater) =

Crater on the Moon

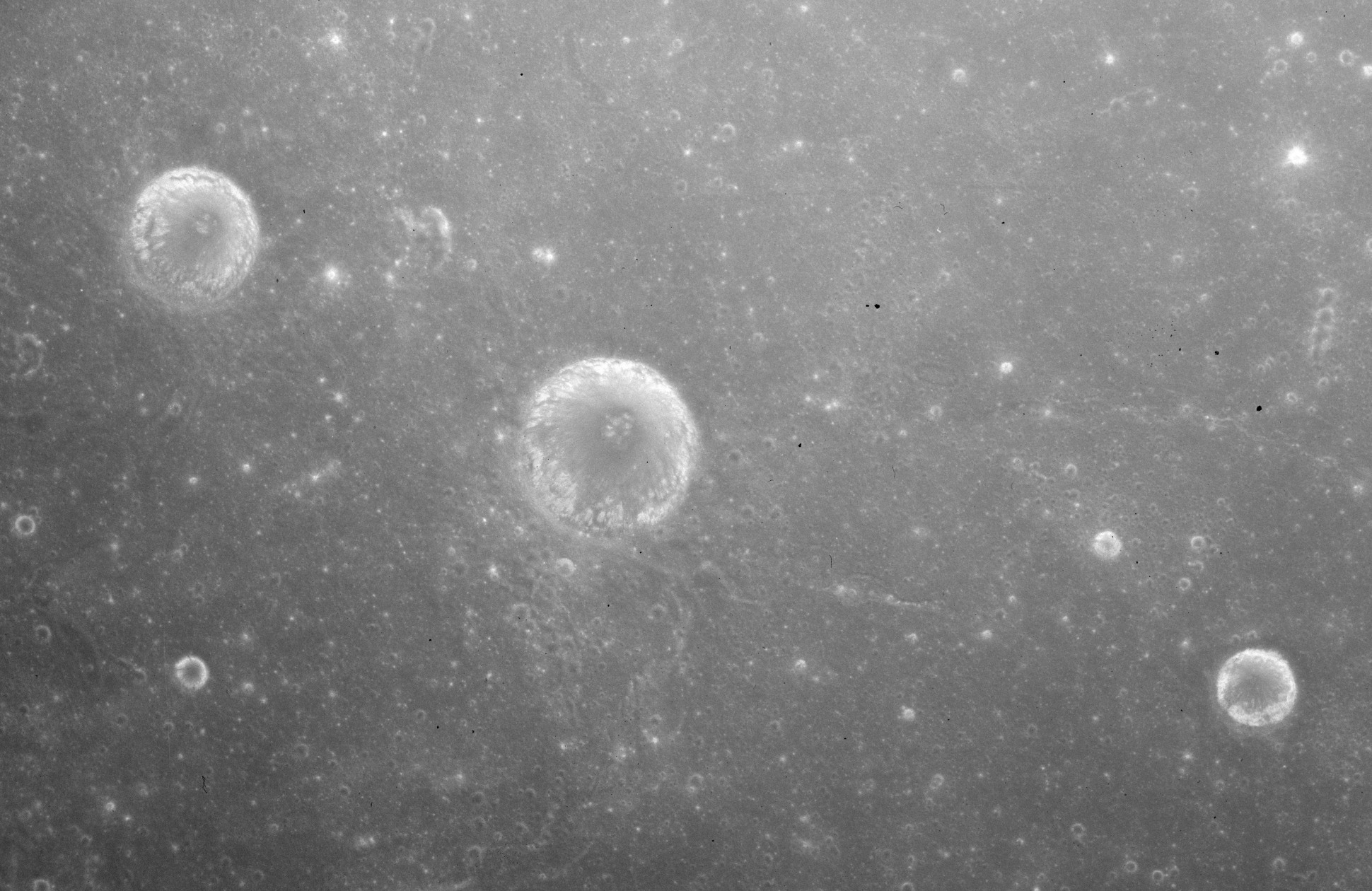
- Apollo 15 Mapping Camera image. Sinas near center, Sinas E in upper left, and Sinas A in lower right
- Coordinates: 8.8°N 31.6°E
- Diameter: 12 km
- Depth: 2.26 km (1.40 mi)
- Colongitude: 329° at sunrise
- Eponym: Simon Sinas

Sinas is a small lunar impact crater that lies in the eastern part of the Moon on the Mare Tranquillitatis. Its diameter is 12 km. It was named after the Greek magnate Simon Sinas. This is an isolated formation that is located very near the midpoint of the lunar mare. Sinas is circular and bowl-shaped, with a small floor at the midpoint. A wrinkle ridge intersects the east edge of the crater, and several lunar domes lie to the north.

Nearby craters include Jansen and Carrel to the northwest, Aryabhata to the southeast, and Maskelyne to the south.

== Views ==
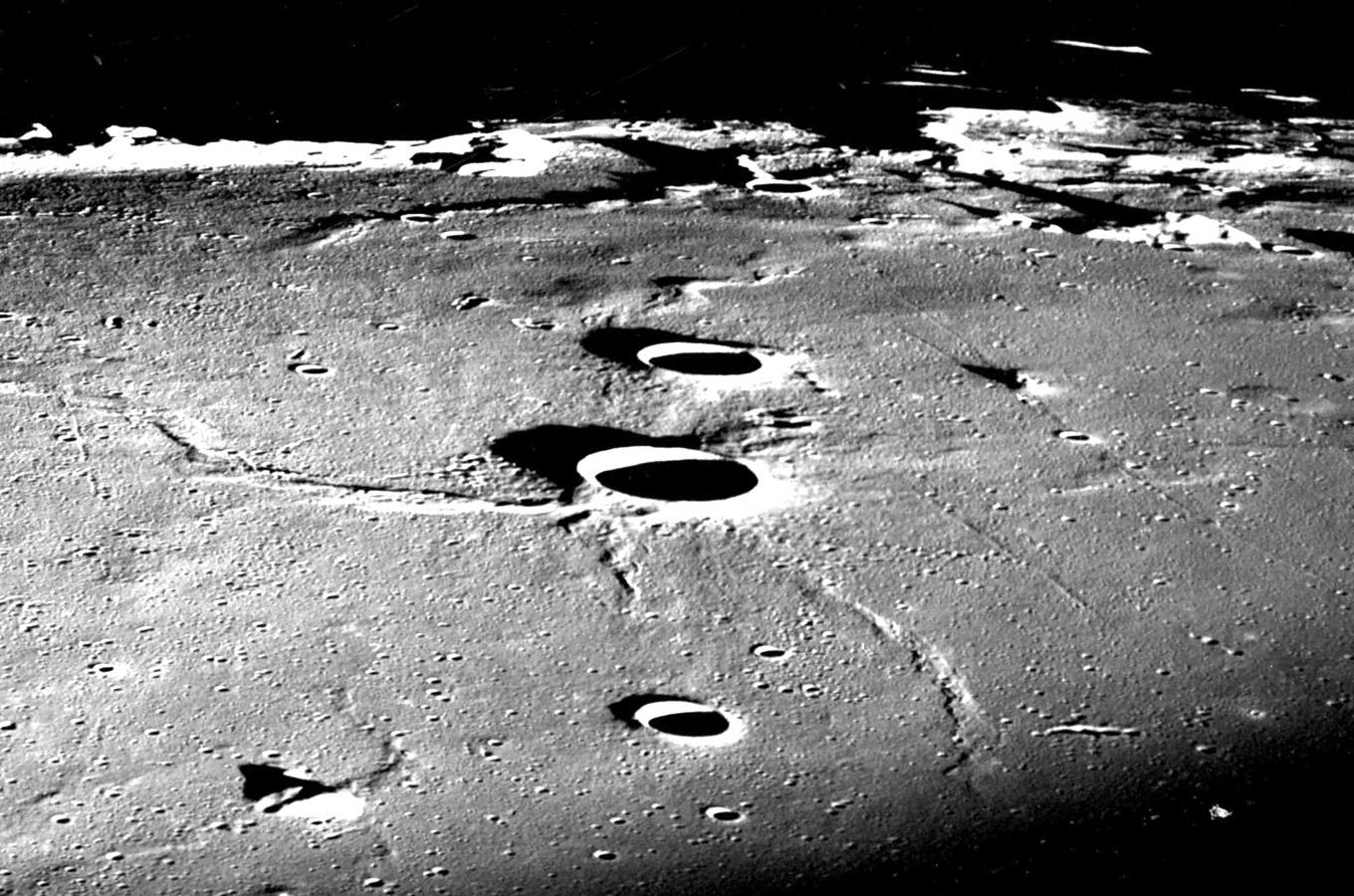
Oblique view at low sun angle from Apollo 8, and one of the lunar domes is at right

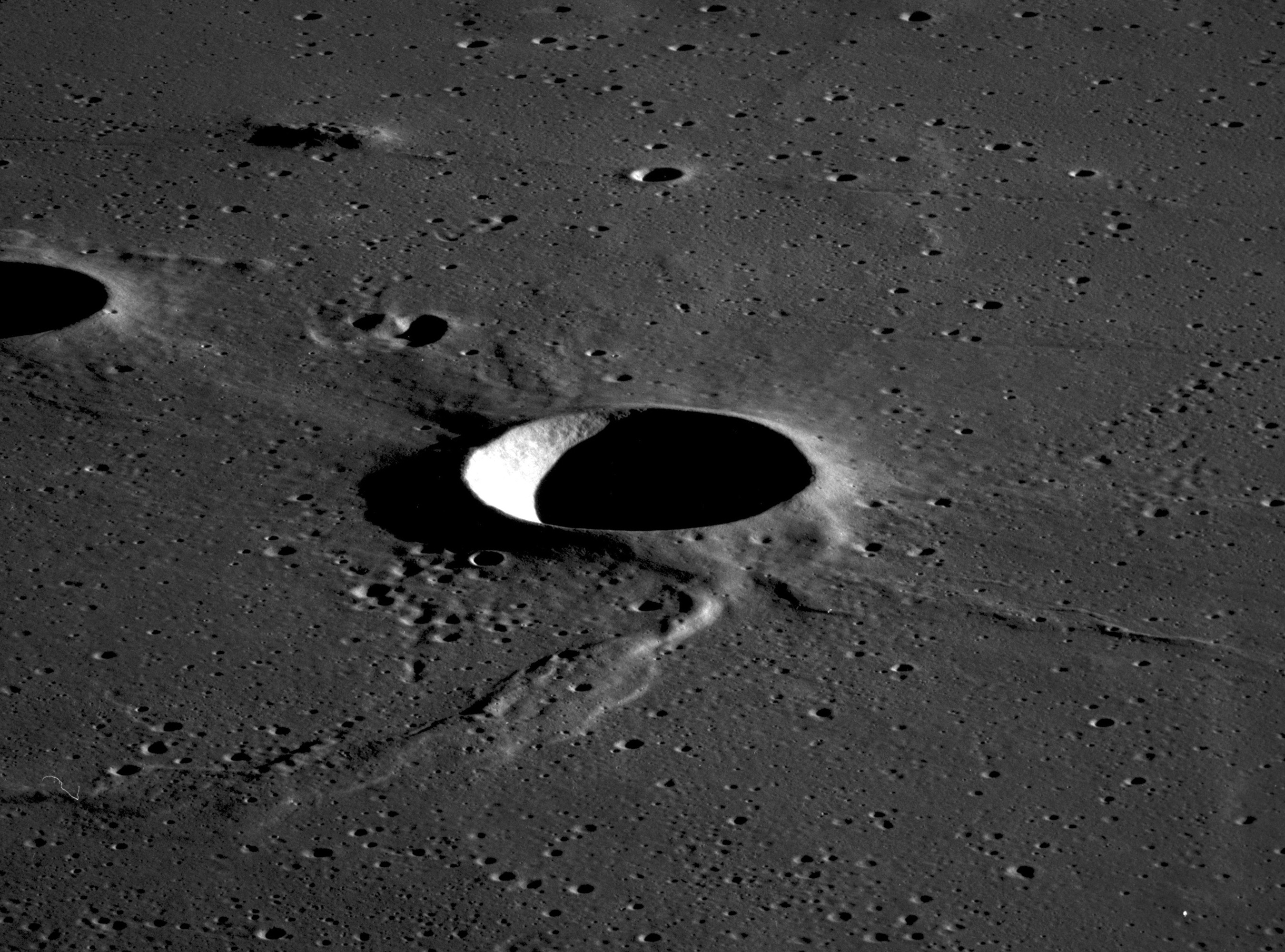
Oblique view at low sun angle from Apollo 11

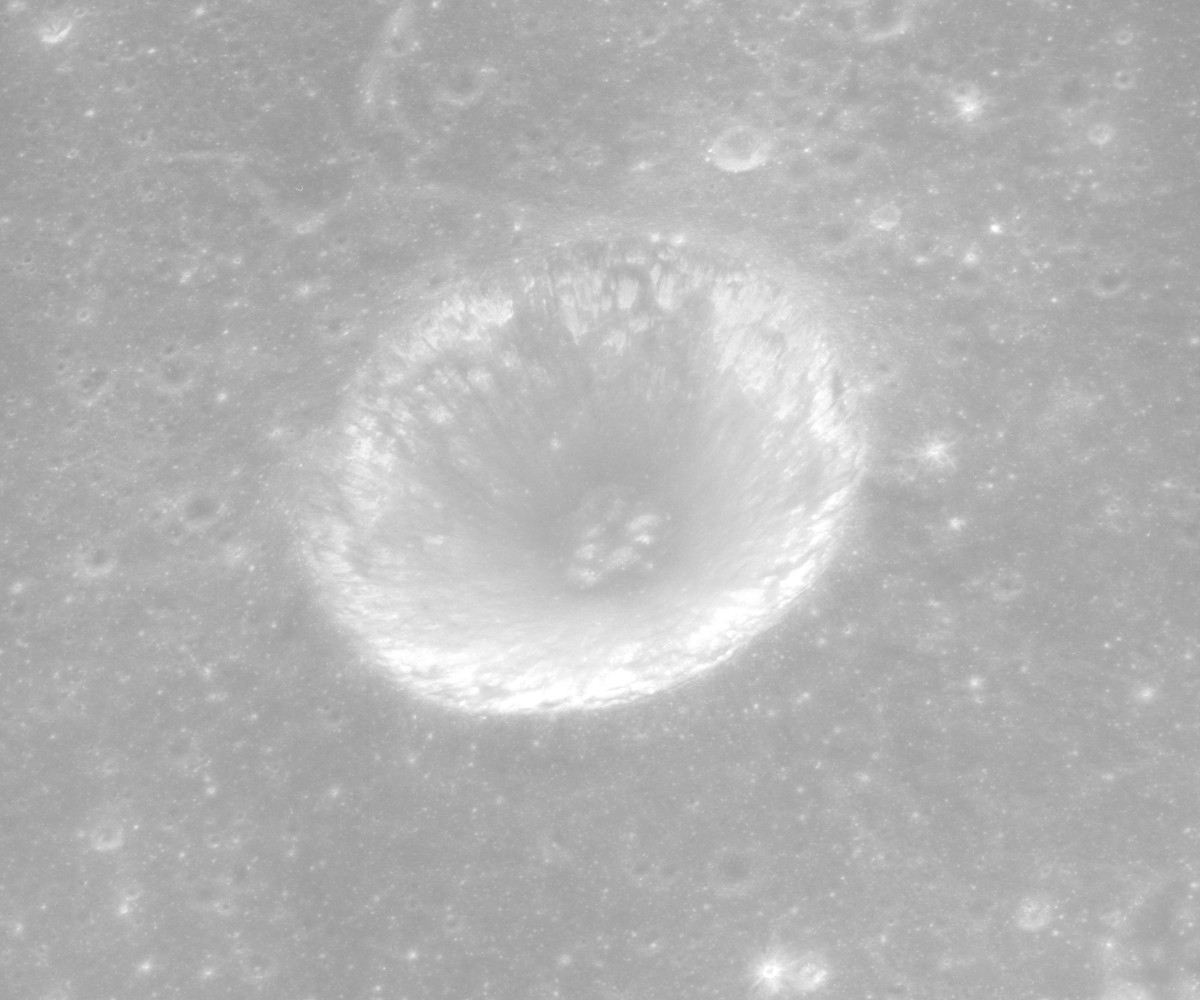
Apollo 15 panoramic camera image, at a high sun angle

== Satellite craters ==
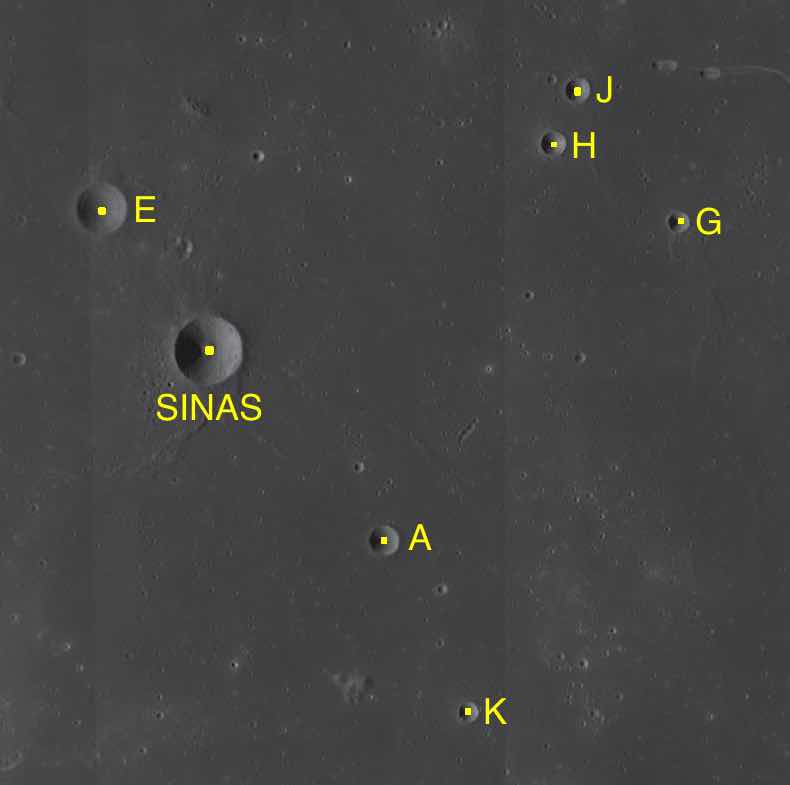
Satellite craters of Sinas

By convention these features are identified on lunar maps by placing the letter on the side of the crater midpoint that is closest to Sinas.

Sinas	Latitude	Longitude	Diameter
A	7.8° N	32.6° E	6 km
E	9.7° N	31.0° E	9 km
G	9.6° N	34.3° E	5 km
H	10.0° N	33.5° E	6 km
J	10.3° N	33.7° E	6 km
K	6.8° N	33.1° E	5 km
