= Milichius (crater) =

Crater on the Moon

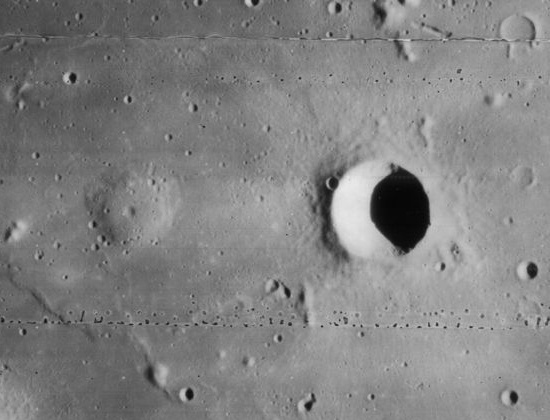
- Lunar Orbiter 4 image of Milichius crater (right) and Milichius Pi lunar dome(left) (horizontal rows of spots are blemishes on original)
- Coordinates: 10.0°N 30.2°W
- Diameter: 13 km
- Depth: 2.5 km
- Colongitude: 30° at sunrise
- Eponym: Jacob Milich

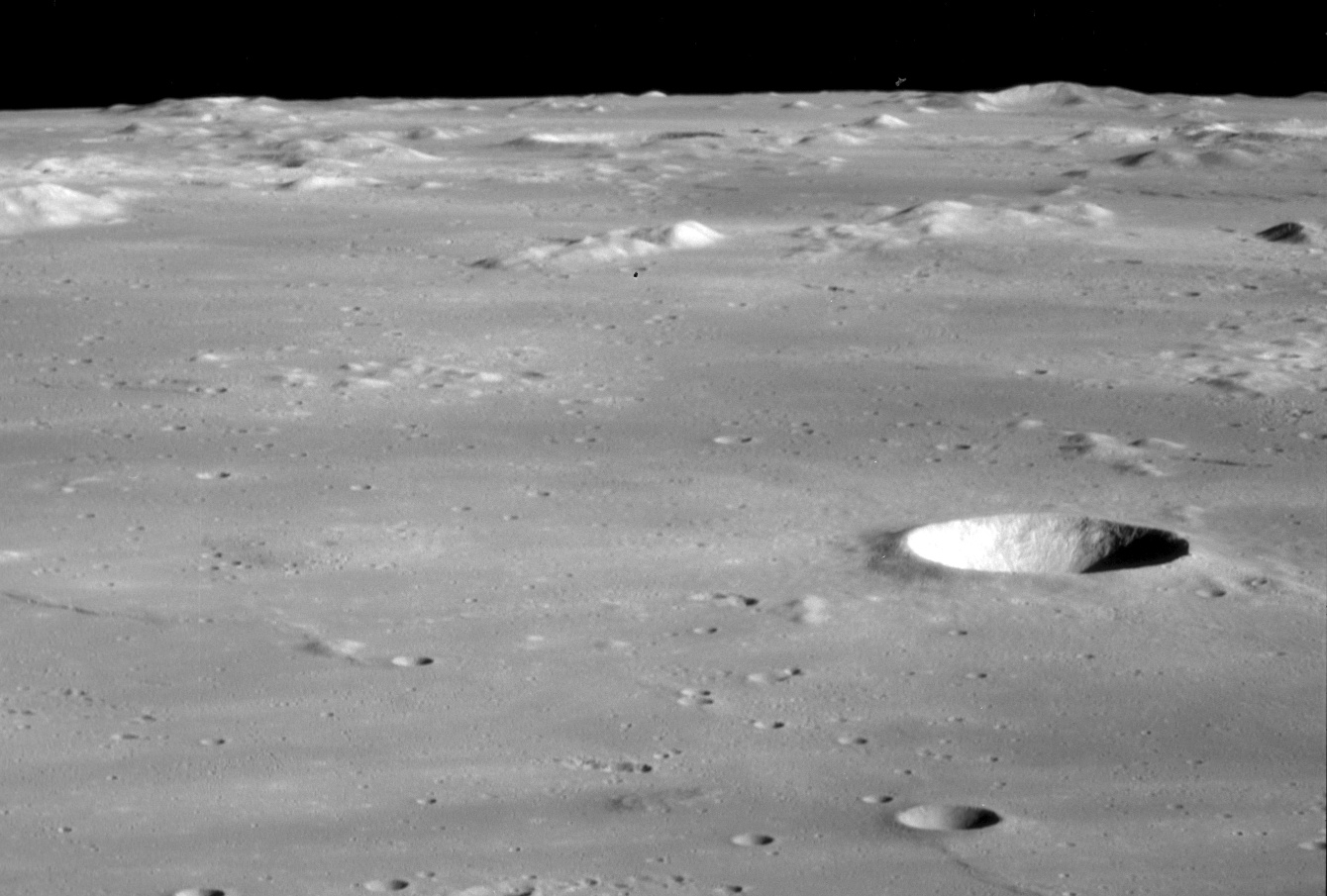
Oblique view from Apollo 12 (facing north)

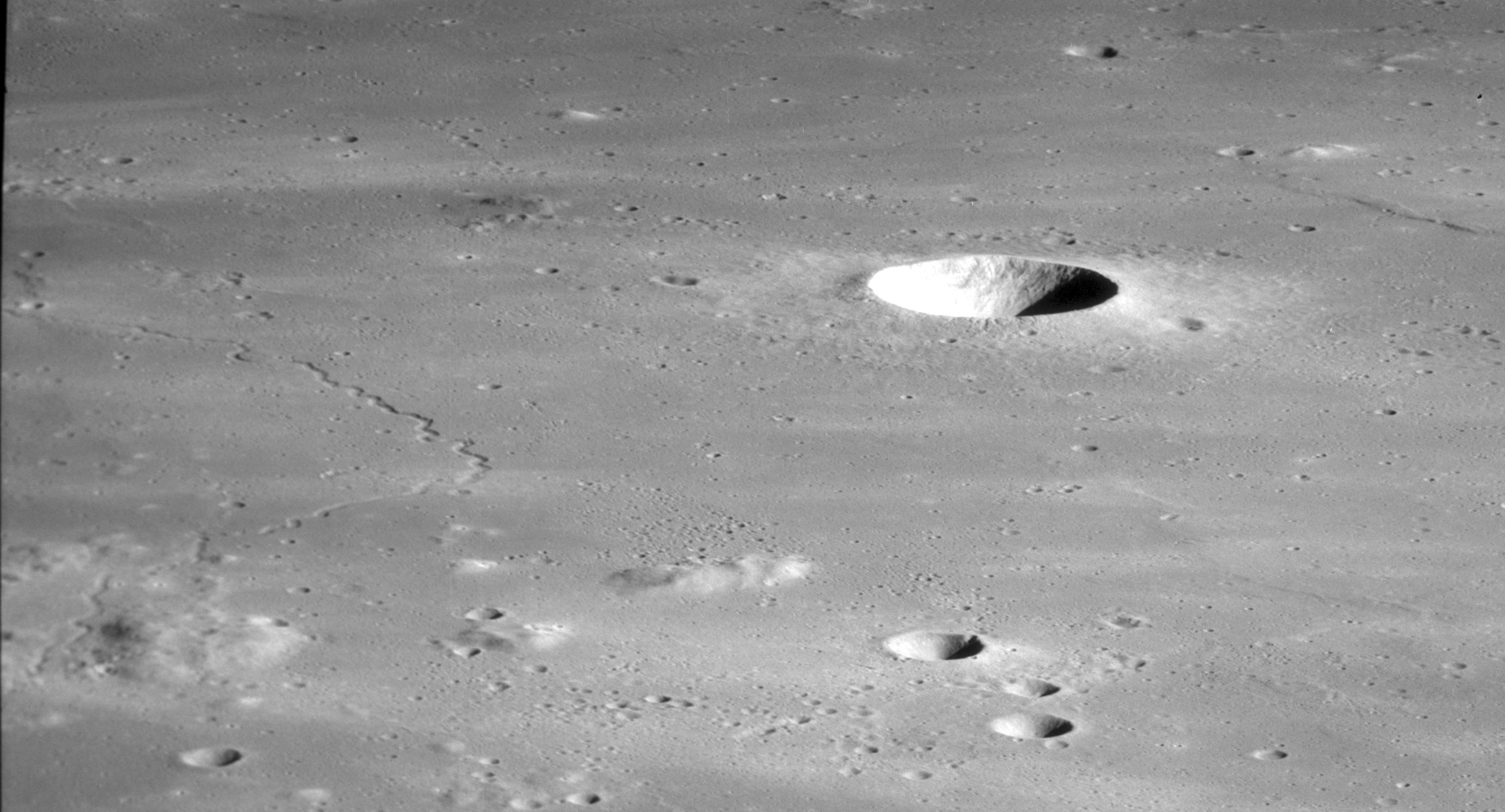
Oblique view of Milichius A crater and part of Milichius Rille, also from Apollo 12

Milichius is a bowl-shaped lunar impact crater that is located in the northern part of the Mare Insularum. T. W. Webb described it as, "remarkably luminous in Full", meaning at full Moon.

To the southeast is the slightly larger Hortensius, a similar formation. Further away due east of Milichius is the prominent and well-known Copernicus. Just to the west is a typical lunar dome designated Milichius Pi (π) that has a tiny craterlet at the peak. The narrow and sinuous Rima Milichius rille is located farther to the southwest, and follows a course running roughly north–south for 100 kilometers.

The crater is named after 16th century German doctor, mathematician and astronomer Jacob Milich, Latinized as Milichius.

== Milichius and Milichius A during full moon ==
Both Milichius and satellite crater Milichius A, westsouthwest of Milichius, are easy to recognize telescopic targets during full moon. The couple of bright looking bowl-shaped craters are located about halfway between Copernicus and Kepler. Their brightness is also noticeable on the photographic version of chart LAC 57 (page 114) in The Clementine Atlas of the Moon (Ben Bussey / Paul D. Spudis).

== Satellite craters ==
By convention these features are identified on lunar maps by placing the letter on the side of the crater midpoint that is closest to Milichius.

Milichius	Latitude	Longitude	Diameter
A	9.3° N	32.0° W	9 km
C	11.2° N	29.4° W	3 km
D	8.0° N	28.2° W	4 km
E	10.7° N	28.1° W	3 km
K	8.5° N	30.3° W	4 km
