= Cajal (crater) =

Crater on the Moon

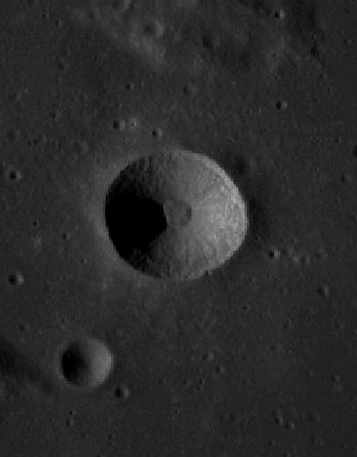
- LRO image
- Coordinates: 12.6°N 31.1°E
- Diameter: 8.57 km (5.33 mi)
- Depth: 1.46 km (0.91 mi)
- Colongitude: 329° at sunrise
- Eponym: Santiago R. Cajal

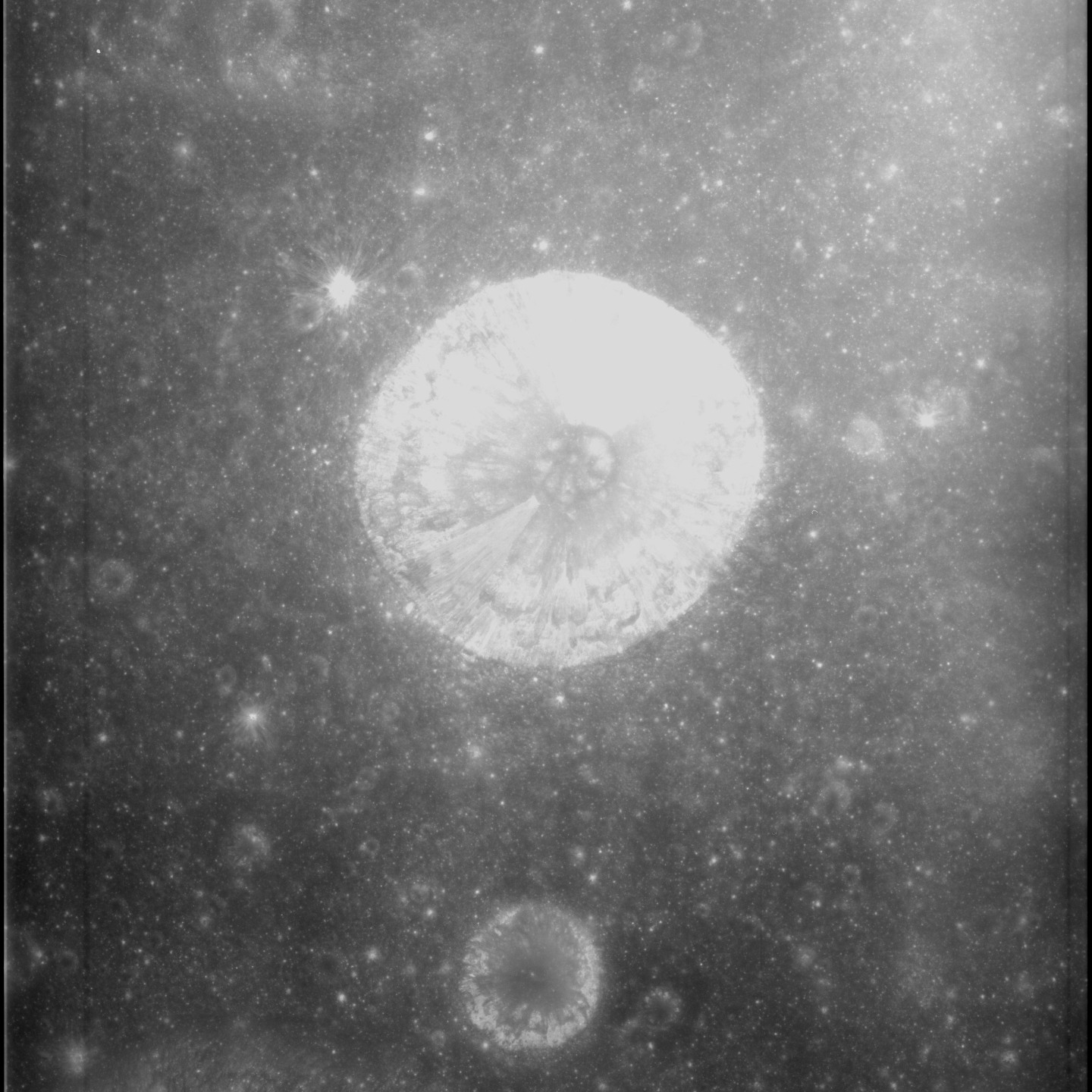
Apollo 15 panoramic camera image

Cajal is a small lunar impact crater on the northern part of the Mare Tranquilitatis. It is a circular (9 km diameter), cup-shaped formation that lies southeast of the lava-inundated crater Jansen. Orbital imagery shows no significant degradation of the crater from subsequent impacts. To the northwest is a system of wrinkle ridges designated the Dorsa Barlow.

Formerly identified as satellite crater Jansen F, this feature was named after the Spanish doctor and Nobel laureate Santiago Ramón y Cajal (1852-1934). Its designation was officially adopted by the International Astronomical Union in 1973.

== Rand McNally's Mitika Peak ==
Hill Jansen alpha, southwest of Cajal and southeast of Jansen, is called Mitika Peak on the greenish colored moonmap from Rand McNally. The name Mitika Peak is also seen on the moonmap in Patrick Moore's Atlas of the Universe (1983). This name was not accepted by the International Astronomical Union (IAU).
