= Martin van den Hove =

Dutch astronomer and mathematician (1605-1639)

Martin (Maarten) van den Hove (Latinized as Martinus Hortensius (Ortensius)) (1605 – 7 August 1639) was a Dutch astronomer and mathematician. His adopted Latin name is a translation of the Dutch hof ("garden"), in Latin horta.

== Early life ==
Born in Delft, he studied at Leiden University under Snellius and Isaac Beeckman from 1625 to 1627. He received further instruction from Snellius from 1628 to 1630 at Leiden and at Ghent.

== Van den Hove and Philippe van Lansberge ==
In 1628, he began studying under Philippe van Lansberge, who was introduced to him by Beeckman. Van den Hove became an enthusiastic supporter of Landsberge, who was by now quite aged, and helped Landsberge complete his project to "restore astronomy" (i.e. create new systematic observations to replace old, insufficient data). Landsberge thanked Van den Hove publicly, considered himself lucky that "by divine providence, in my old age, pressed by sickness, such a strong helper came to my aid, as formerly the learned Rheticus to the great Copernicus."

In 1632, at Copenhagen (Hafnia in Latin) and later reprinted at London in 1696, Petrus Bartholin published Apologia pro observationibus, et hypothesibus...Tycho Brahe...Contra...Martini Hortensii Delfensis criminationes et calumnies, quas in praefationem commentationum praeceptoris sui Philippi Lansbergii Middelburgensis, de motu terrae diurno et annuo etc. cosarcinnavit ("Defense of the Astronomical Observations and Theses of Tycho Brahe against the accusations and false claims of Martinus Hortensius of Delft, which appear in his preface of the commentary by his teacher Philip van Landsberge, who wrote on the daily and annual motion of the earth"). Van den Hove had attacked many of Tycho Brahe's claims in his preface to his Latin translation of a work by Landsbergen. This was the Commentationes in motum terrae diurnum, & annuum (Middelburg, 1630). The first Latin edition of Landsberge's illustrated treatise, the Commentationes taught the probability of earth’s motion according to the Copernican theory. Van den Hove regarded Landsberge, not Tycho Brahe, as the one who was restoring astronomy. "Only Landsberge held all ancient observations in esteem," Van den Hove wrote, "whereas Tycho, Longomontanus, and Kepler tended to neglect them."

== Career as lecturer ==
At the encouragement of Gerard Vossius and Caspar Barlaeus, Van den Hove began lecturing on the mathematical sciences at the Amsterdam Atheneum (Athenaeum Illustre) in 1634. The Athenaeum Illustre, which had its seat in the fourteenth century Agnietenkapel, is commonly regarded as the predecessor of the University of Amsterdam. Upon assuming his new duties, Van den Hove delivered an inaugural speech, later published as De dignitate et utilitate Matheseos ("On the dignity and utility of the mathematical sciences").

Van den Hove also lectured on optics at Amsterdam (1635), and on navigation (1637). In 1638, Van den Hove was made a member of the commission negotiating with Galileo on the determination of longitude by the method of Jupiter's moons.

== Work and legacy ==
Van den Hove developed a method for measuring the diameters of planets based on the measured visual angle that his telescope revealed. His was probably the first independent set of measurements of the apparent sizes of the planets and fixed stars since the work of Hipparchus in his On Sizes and Distances some seventeen centuries earlier. Van den Hove corresponded with René Descartes, Marin Mersenne, Pierre Gassendi, Christiaan Huygens, and Galileo Galilei. He was made full professor "in the Copernican theory" in 1635 and then nominated professor at Leiden University in 1639, but he died there shortly afterwards.

The crater Hortensius on the Moon is named after him.

== Works ==
- (in English) The Galileo Project: Martinus Hortensius
- (in English) Rienk Vermij, The Calvinist Copernicans
- (in English) Abstract Volker Remmert
- (in English) Volker R. Remmert, What Do You Need a Mathematician For? Martinus Hortensius’s “Speech on the Dignity and Utility of the Mathematical Sciences” (Amsterdam 1634), in: The Mathematical Intelligencer 26:4 (2004), 40-47
- (in English) Annette Imhausen/Volker R. Remmert: The Oration on the Dignity and the Usefulness of the Mathematical Sciences of Martinus Hortensius (Amsterdam, 1634): Text, Translation and Commentary, in: History of Universities 21 (2006), 71-150
