= Jacob Milich =

German physician and mathematician

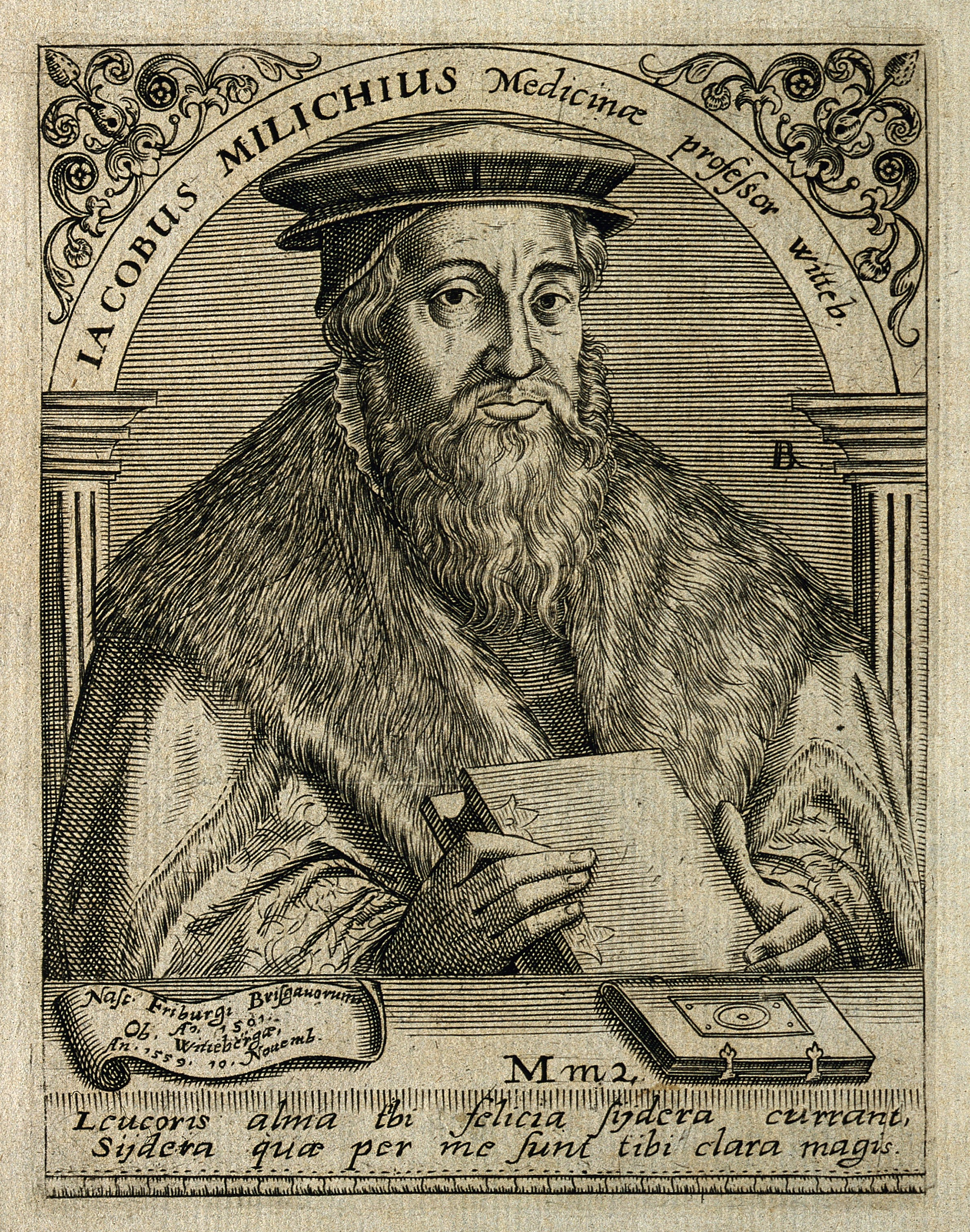
Portrait engraving. Credit: Wellcome Library

Jakob Milich (January 24, 1501 – November 10, 1559) was a German physician and mathematician.

He was born in Freiburg im Breisgau, where his father held public office. He matriculated at Freiburg University in 1514, received a Bachelor's degree the following year and earned a Master of Arts in 1520 while studying under Desiderius Erasmus.

Milich then moved to Vienna, where he pursued studies in both medicine and mathematics under the tutelage of Johann Purbach and Johann Regiomontanus. In 1524, he settled permanently in Wittenburg and was appointed a professor in philosophy and later in medicine. Perhaps his most notable student was Erasmus Reinhold, who later became an astronomer. For many years, Milich not only taught medicine but also practiced it, acquiring a reputation as a skilled physician. In 1536, his friend and colleague Philip Melanchthon traveled to the Palatinate; Milich accompanied him on the trip and was able to visit his native city of Freiburg again.

During his career, he became dean of the Wittenberg University's philosophical and medical branches, then served as rector of the school on several occasions. Among his works was a 1535 commentary on the second book of Pliny the Elder.

He died in Wittenberg on November 10, 1559.

The crater Milichius on the Moon is named after him.

== Sources ==
- Franck, Jakob (1885). "Milich (Milichius), Jakob". Allgemeine Deutsche Biographie. online. Vol. 21.
- "Jakob Milich - the Mathematics Genealogy Project".
