= Jansen (crater) =

Impact crater

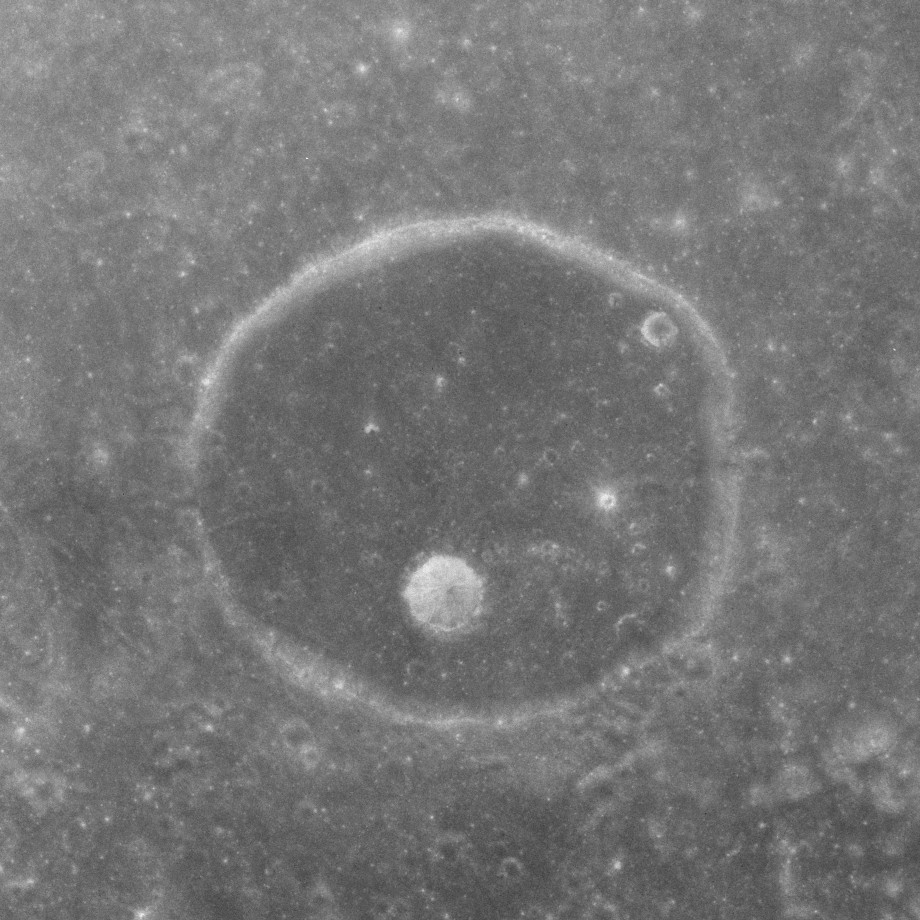
- Apollo 17 Mapping Camera image
- Coordinates: 13.5°N 28.7°E
- Diameter: 24 km
- Depth: 0.34 km
- Colongitude: 351° at sunrise
- Eponym: Zacharias Janssen

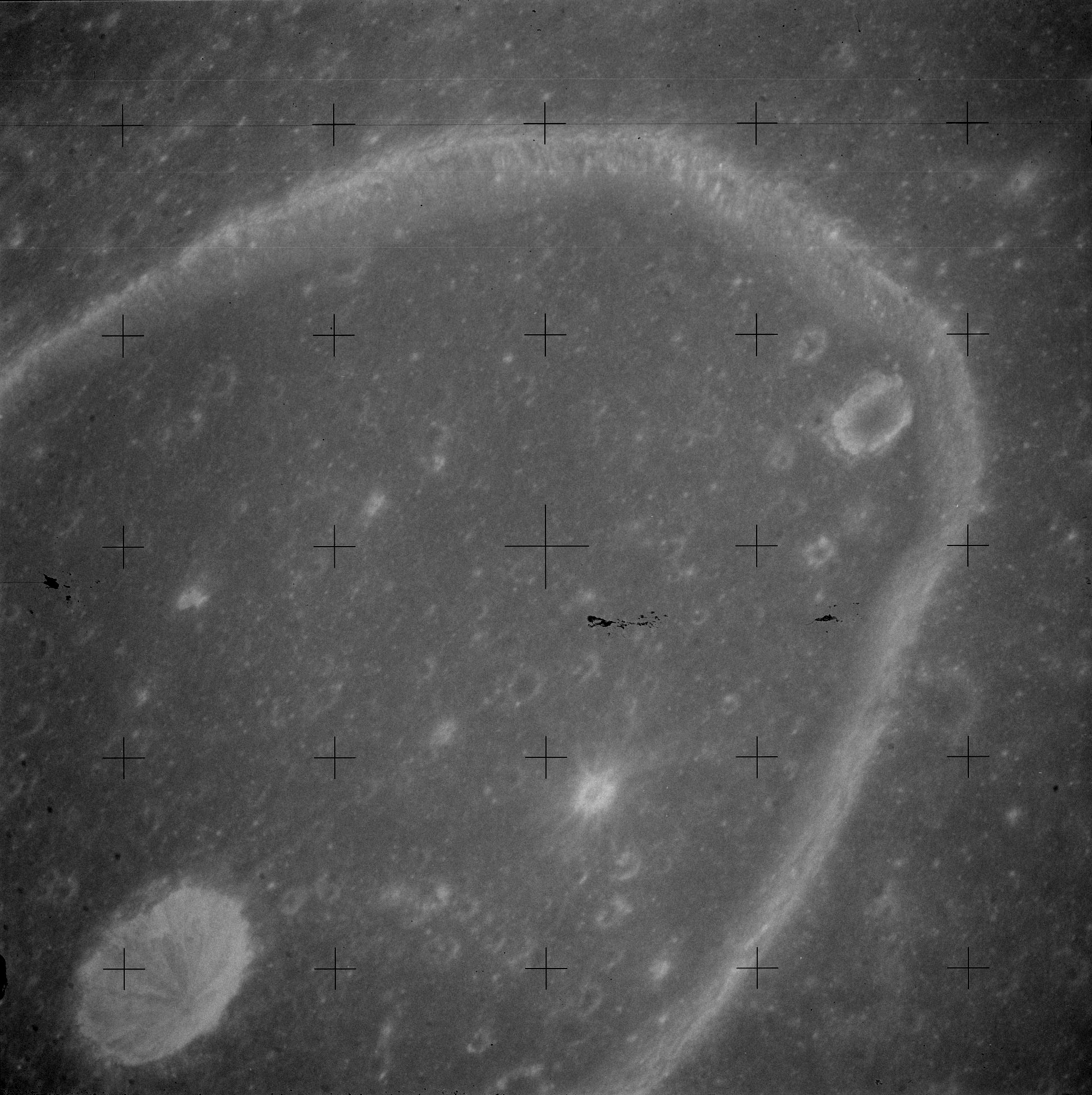
Oblique view from Apollo 15

Jansen is a lunar impact crater in the north part of the Mare Tranquillitatis. The diameter is 24 km. It was named after 17th century Dutch optician Zacharias Janssen. It is located to the east-southeast of the crater Plinius. The rim of Jansen is low and narrow, with a notch along the western edge. The interior is relatively level, which may indicate it has been covered by lava. To the south-southwest a small but prominent crater lies on the crater floor, halfway between the center and the rim.

To the northwest of the rim is a rille named Rima Jansen, and to the east are wrinkle ridges in the mare surface. A low ridge runs from near the southeast rim in a southeasterly direction.

== Rand McNally's Mitika Peak ==
Hill Jansen alpha, southeast of crater Jansen and southwest of Cajal, is called Mitika Peak on the greenish colored moonmap from Rand McNally. The name Mitika Peak is also seen on the moonmap in Patrick Moore's Atlas of the Universe (1983). This name was not accepted by the International Astronomical Union (IAU).

== Satellite craters ==
By convention these features are identified on lunar maps by placing the letter on the side of the crater midpoint that is closest to Jansen.

Jansen	Latitude	Longitude	Diameter
D	15.7° N	28.4° E	7 km
E	14.5° N	27.8° E	7 km
G	9.3° N	26.0° E	6 km
H	11.4° N	28.4° E	7 km
K	11.5° N	29.7° E	6 km
L	14.7° N	30.1° E	7 km
R	15.2° N	28.8° E	25 km
T	11.4° N	33.5° E	5 km
U	11.9° N	32.3° E	4 km
W	10.2° N	29.5° E	3 km
Y	13.4° N	28.6° E	4 km

The following craters have been renamed by the IAU.

- Jansen B — See Carrel.
- Jansen C — See Beketov.
- Jansen F — See Cajal.
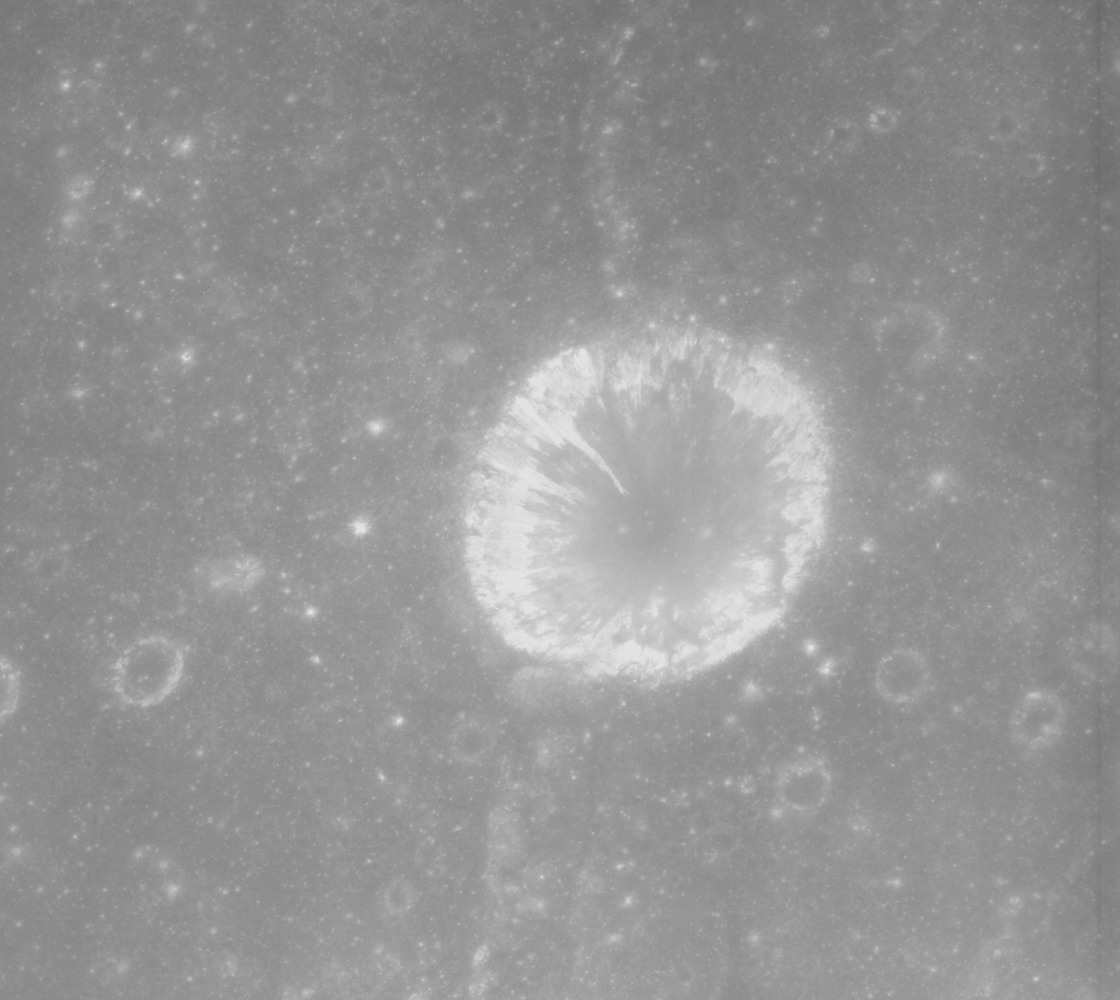
Jansen L

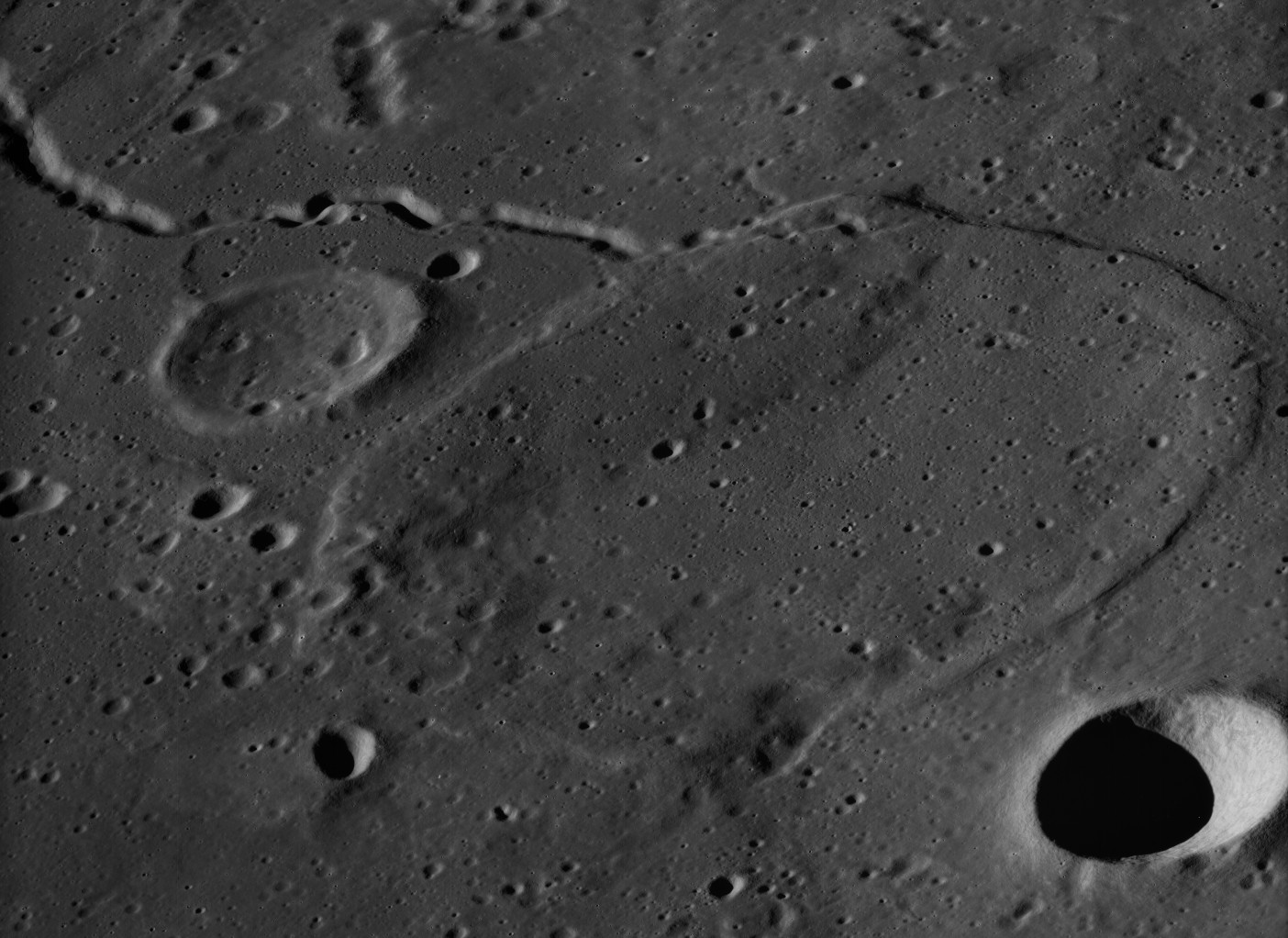
Oblique view of the ghost crater Jansen R ("pancake" at center) and Jansen D crater (lower right)
