= Dorsa Barlow =

Wrinkle ridge system on the Moon

Dorsa Barlow is a wrinkle ridge system on the Moon, in Mare Tranquilitatis near the border with Mare Serenitatis, centered at 14.0°N 30.6°E. It is about 110 km long and was named after British crystallographer William Barlow in 1976.

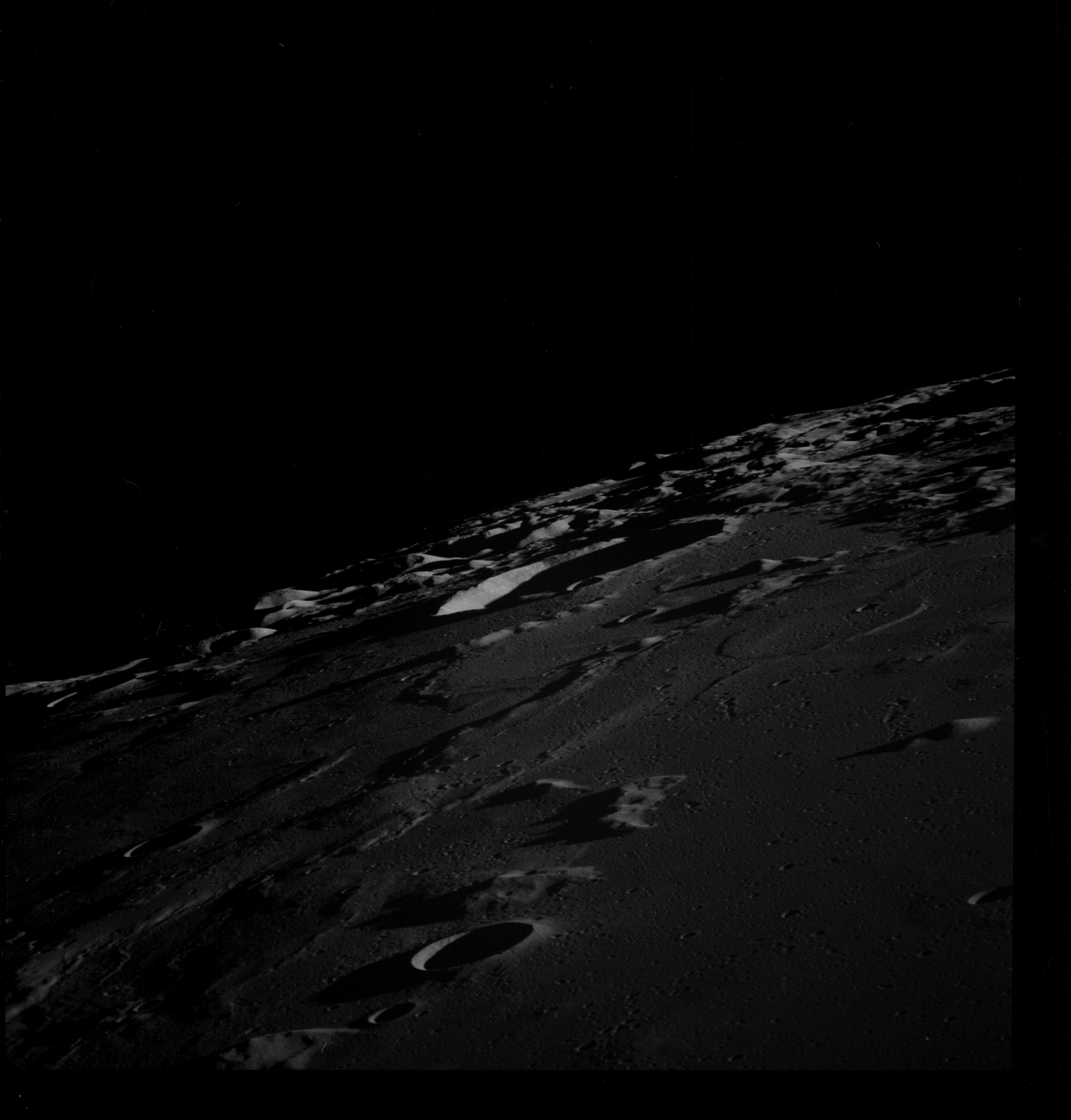
Oblique view from Apollo 8, at the lunar terminator, with Dorsa Barlow in the foreground, Vitruvius crater at center, and the Montes Taurus in the background.

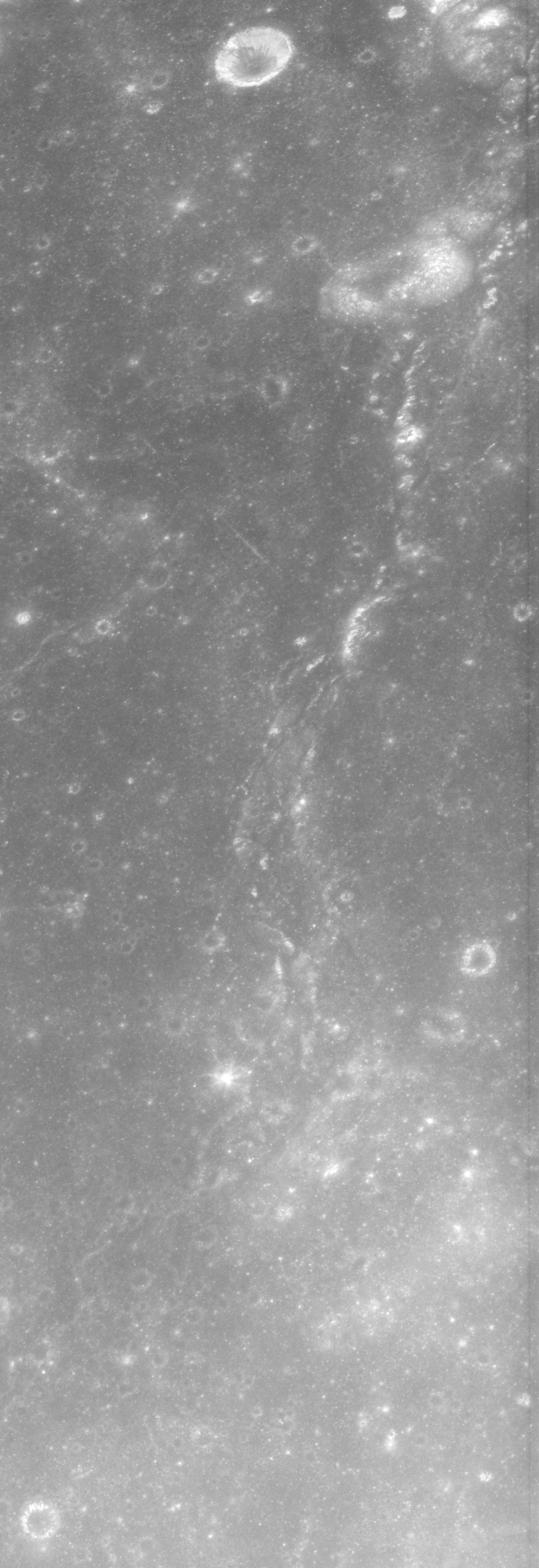
Oblique view from Apollo 15, at high sun angle
