= Carrel (crater) =

Crater on the Moon

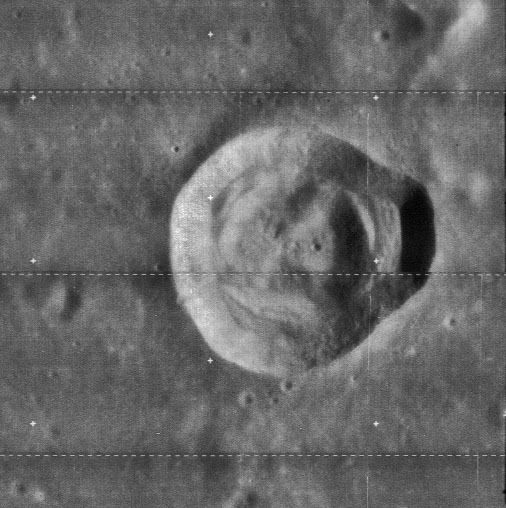
- Lunar Orbiter 4 image
- Coordinates: 10.7°N 26.7°E
- Diameter: 15.59 km (9.69 mi)
- Depth: 2.09 km (1.30 mi)
- Colongitude: 333° at sunrise
- Eponym: Alexis Carrel

Carrel is a small lunar crater on the Mare Tranquillitatis. It has a distorted appearance, having a slight protruding bulge in the northwest rim. The interior is somewhat irregular, with ridges and some slumped material. This crater lies across a ridge in the surface of the mare. The presence of materials with different albedo on the outer crater wall suggests movement of talus at different times due to slope processes.

This crater was named after the French doctor and physiologist Alexis Carrel (1873-1944), a Nobel-winner and Nazi collaborator. Its designation was officially adopted by the International Astronomical Union in 1979. Previously, it was identified as satellite feature Jansen B. The lava-flooded crater Jansen lies to the northeast.

== Views ==
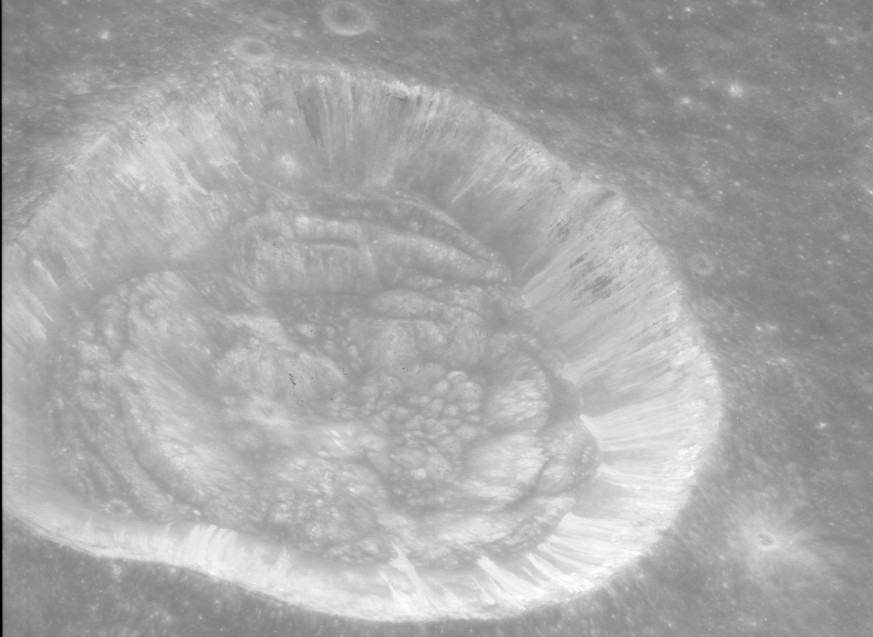
Oblique view of Carrel from Apollo 15 panoramic camera. This shows numerous bright avalanche deposits, and that the floor is a jumble of slump blocks.

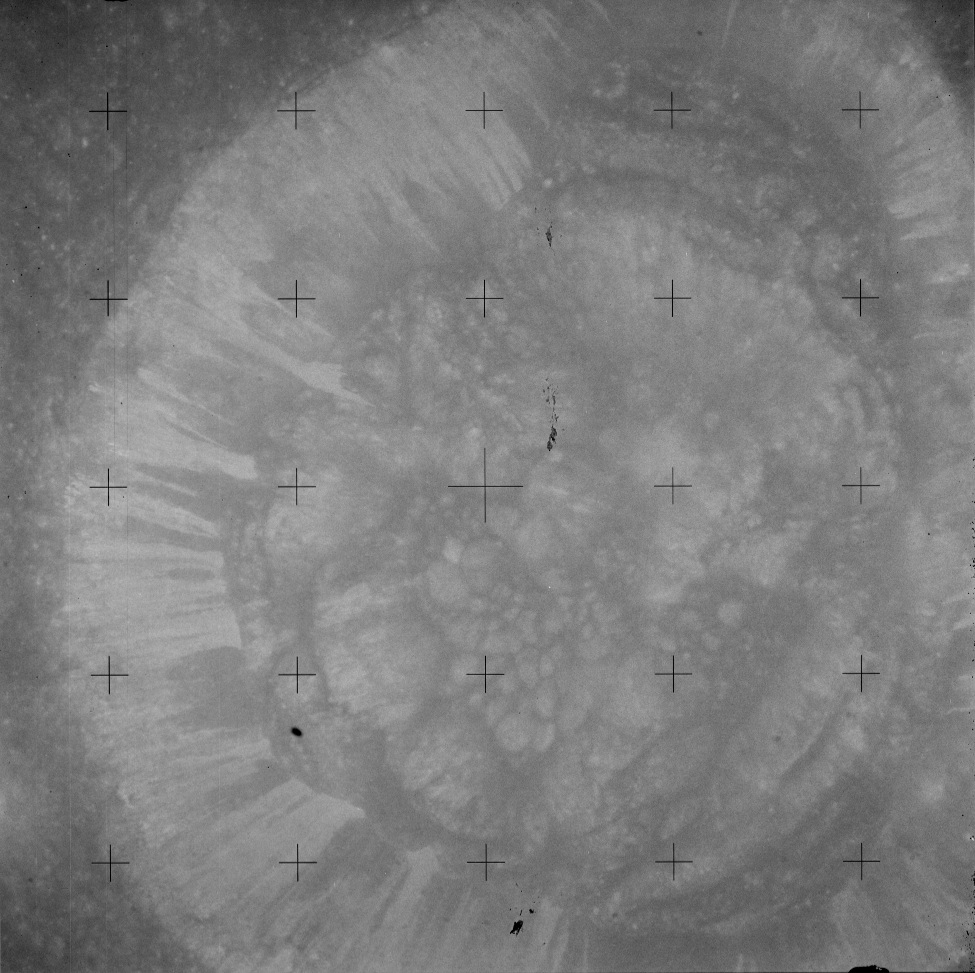
Another view of the interior from Apollo 15

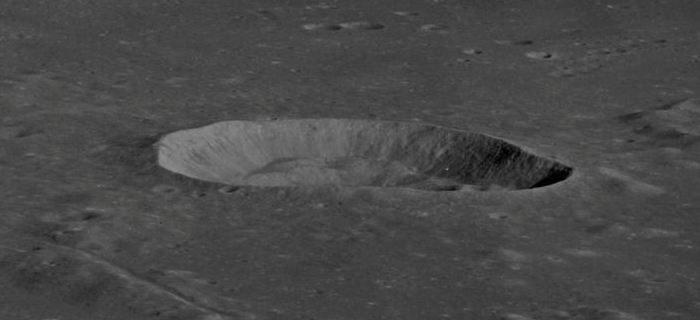
Highly oblique view from Apollo 10, facing northwest

== Sources ==
- Rükl, Antonín (1990). Atlas of the Moon. Kalmbach Books. ISBN 978-0-913135-17-4.
- Wlasuk, Peter T. (2000). Observing the Moon. Springer. ISBN 978-1-85233-193-1.
