= Nikolay Beketov =

Russian-Ukrainian chemist

Nikolay Nikolayevich Beketov
- Николай Николаевич Бекетов
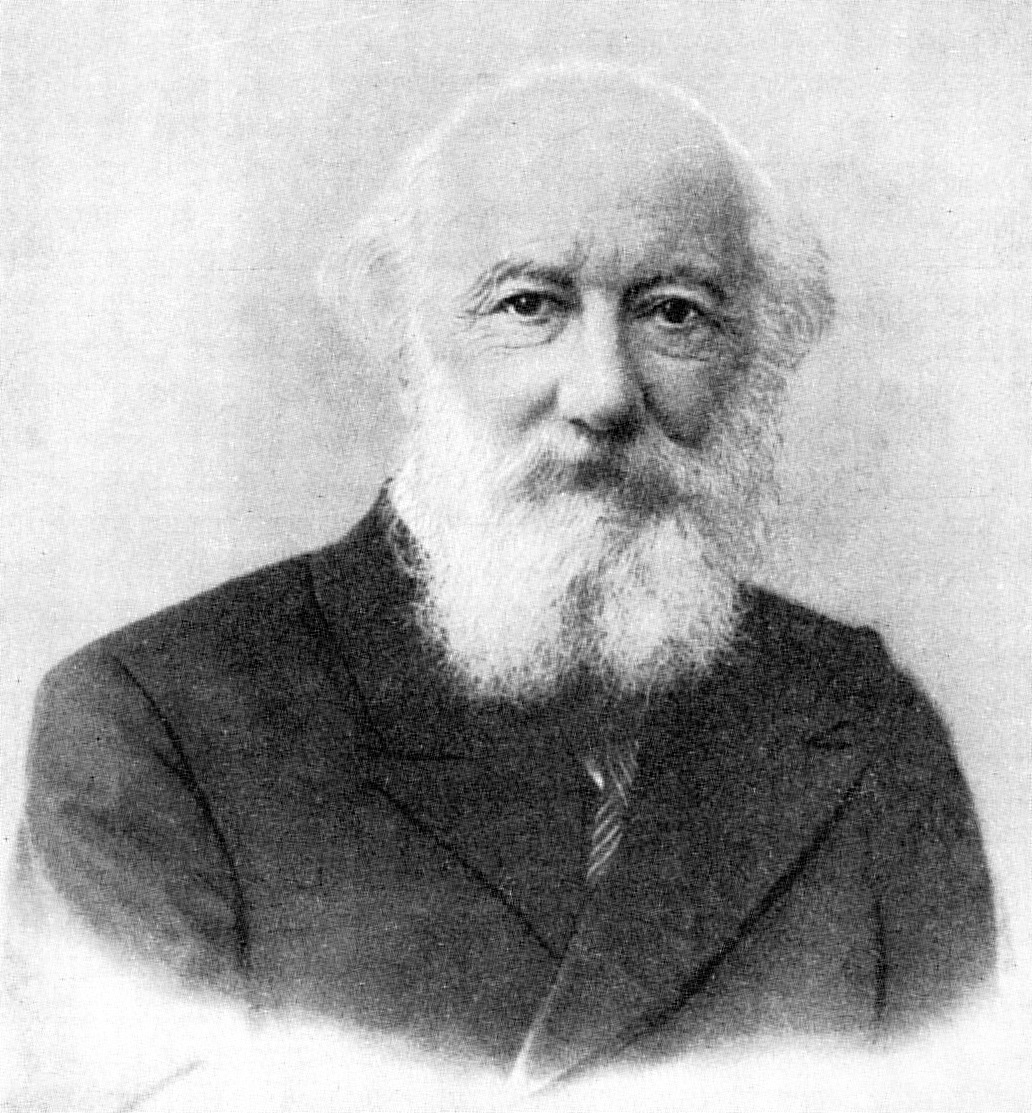
- Born: January 13 [O.S. January 1] 1827; Alferovka, Penza Governorate, Russian Empire
- Died: 13 December [O.S. 30 November] 1911; Saint Petersburg, Russian Empire

Nikolay Nikolayevich Beketov (Russian: Николай Николаевич Бекетов; 13 January [O.S. 1 January] 1827, Alferovka (now Beketovka), Penza Governorate, Russian Empire – 13 December [O.S. 30 November] 1911, St. Petersburg, Russian Empire) was a Russian Imperial physical chemist and metallurgist.

He was the father of a well-known Russian architect Alexei Beketov.

== Life and work ==
In 1849 Beketov graduated from Kazan University and worked with Nikolay Zinin.

In 1855 he became a junior scientific assistant in the Department of Chemistry at Kharkov University.

In 1859-1887 Beketov was a professor at the same university.

In 1865 he defended his PhD thesis on "Research into the phenomenon of displacement of one element by another" ("Russian: Исследования над явлениями вытеснения одних металлов другими").

In 1886 Beketov moved to Saint Petersburg, where he worked at the academic chemical laboratory and taught at the University for Women.

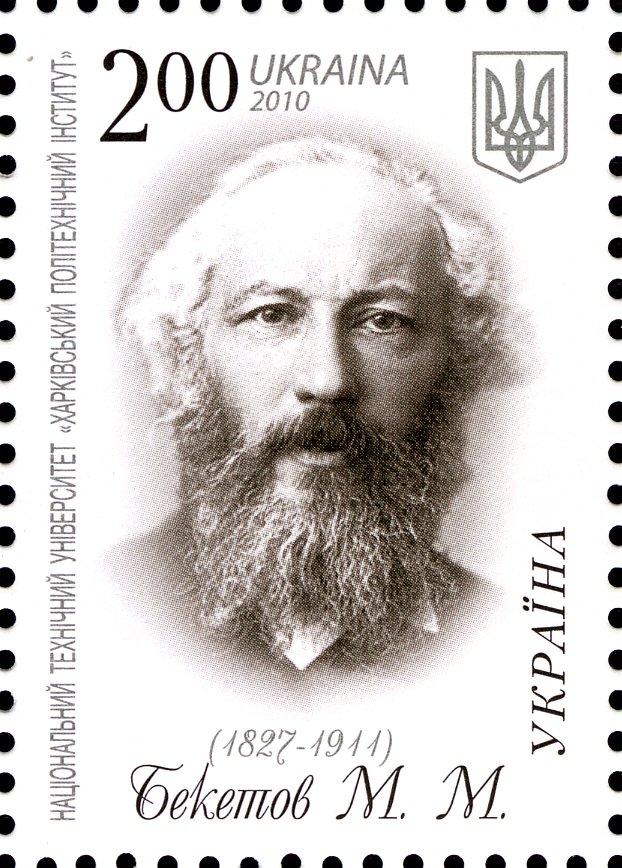
Beketov on a 2010 commemorative stamp of Ukraine

In 1890 Beketov delivered lectures on the "Basics of Thermochemistry" at Moscow State University.

Beketov discovered displacement of metals from solutions of their salts by hydrogen under pressure. He also established that magnesium and zinc displaced other metals from their salts under high temperatures.

In 1859-1865 Beketov proved that aluminum restored metals from their oxides under high temperatures. Later on, Beketov's experiments served as a starting point for aluminothermy.

Beketov's biggest merit was his contribution into physical chemistry as an independent science. In 1860 he taught a course on "Relations between physical and chemical phenomena" in Kharkov and a course on "Physical Chemistry" in 1865.

In 1864 a Physical Chemistry Department in Kharkov University was established with his active participation, where students would conduct research and do practical work.

In 1886 Beketov was elected a full member of the Petersburg Academy of Sciences.

Beketov's students were Alexander Eltekov, Flavian Flavitsky and others. The poet Alexander Blok was his brother's grandson.
