= Hortensius (crater) =

Crater on the Moon

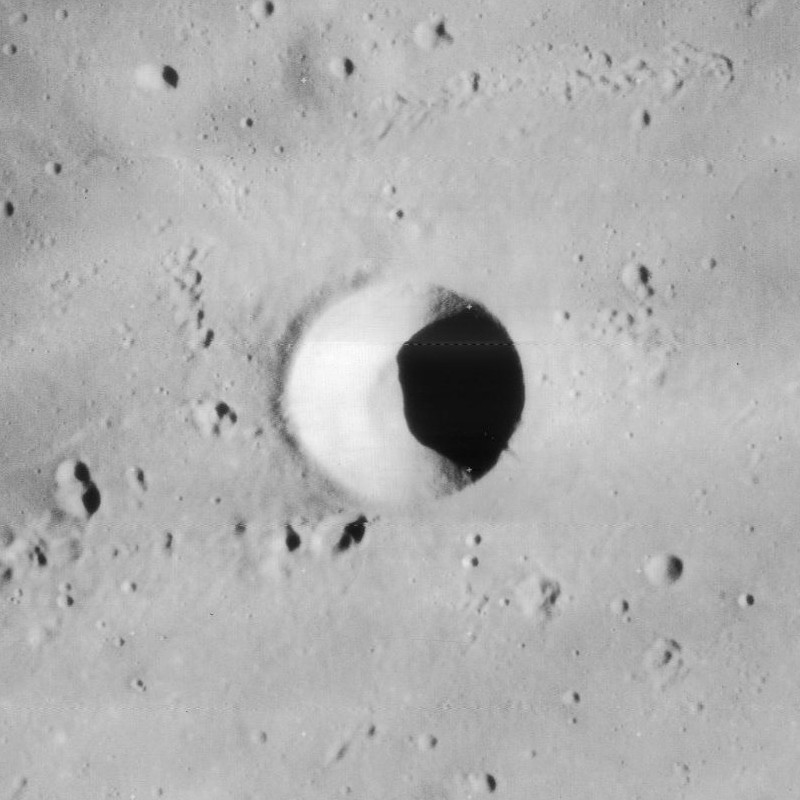
- Lunar Orbiter 4 image (Note also lunar dome at top center)
- Coordinates: 6.5°N 28.0°W
- Diameter: 15 km (9 mi)
- Depth: 2.86 km (1.78 mi)
- Colongitude: 28° at sunrise
- Eponym: Martin van den Hove

Hortensius is a small, bowl-shaped lunar impact crater that is located in the northern part of the Mare Insularum. It was named after 17th century Dutch astronomer Martin van den Hove (Latinized as Martinus Hortensius).

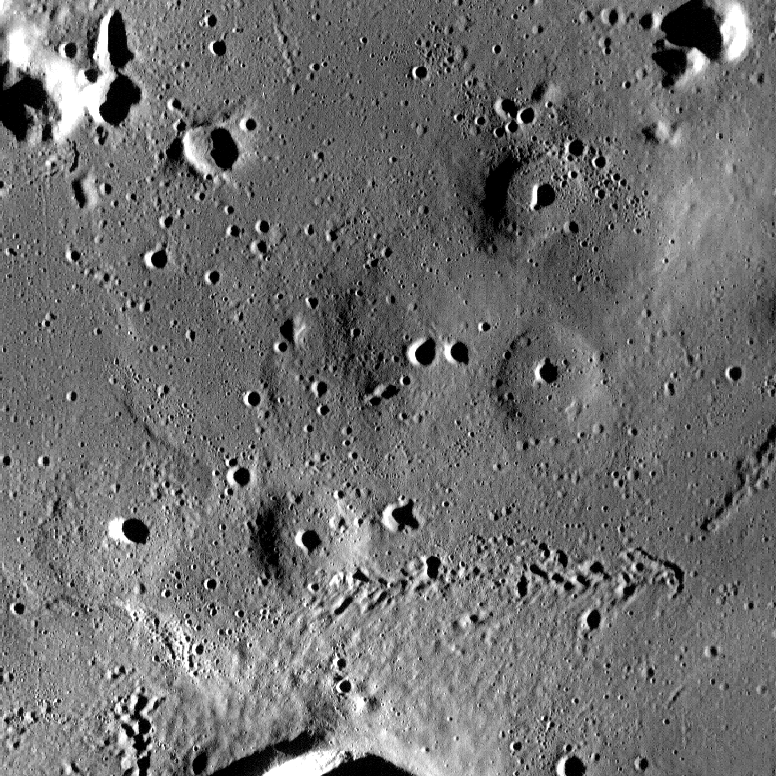
Image of lunar domes north of Hortensius, from Lunar Reconnaissance Orbiter

It lies some distance to the west-southwest of the prominent crater Copernicus. Hortensius is circular and cup-shaped, with a small floor at the midpoint of the sloping interior walls. The interior has a higher albedo than the surrounding lunar mare, despite traces of ray material from Copernicus.

To the north of this feature is a collection of six lunar domes, many having a tiny craterlet at the summit. These are shield volcanoes that were formed by a highly viscous type of lava. The domes are generally circular in form, with a diameter of 6–8 kilometers (4–5 mi), and rising as high as 400 meters (1300 ft). They are formed of the same material as the surrounding mare, although from a different process.

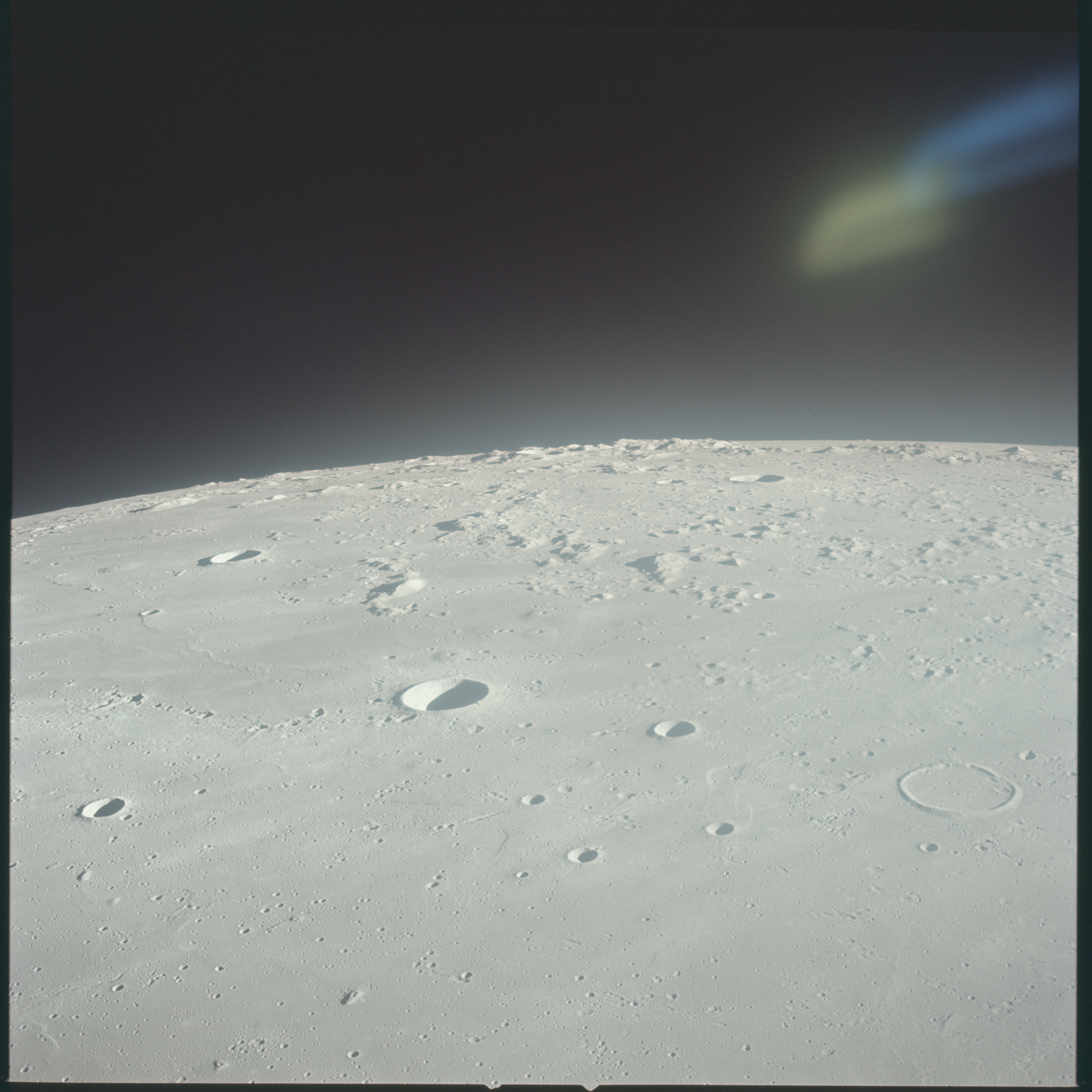
Apollo 12 Hasselblad image

== Satellite craters ==
By convention these features are identified on lunar maps by placing the letter on the side of the crater midpoint that is closest to Hortensius.

Hortensius	Latitude	Longitude	Diameter (km)	Diameter (mi)
A	4.4° N	30.7° W	10 km	6 mi
B	5.3° N	29.5° W	6 km	4 mi
C	6.0° N	26.7° W	7 km	4 mi
D	5.4° N	32.3° W	6 km	4 mi
E	5.2° N	25.4° W	15 km	9 mi
F	7.1° N	25.6° W	6 km	4 mi
G	8.1° N	26.1° W	4 km	2½ mi
H	5.9° N	31.1° W	6 km	4 mi

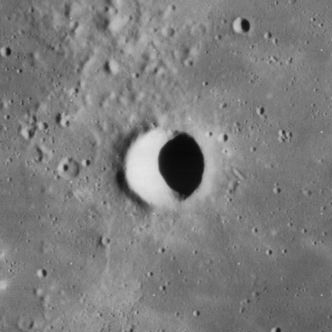
Lunar Orbiter 4 image of Hortensius A

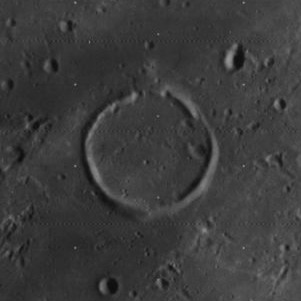
Lunar Orbiter 4 image of Hortensius E
