= Lunar dome =

Type of shield volcano on the Moon

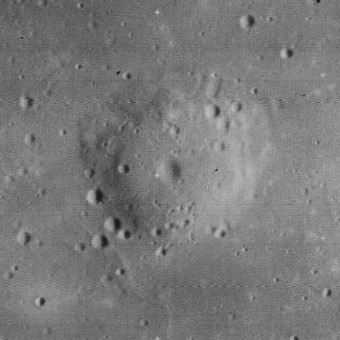
Typical lunar dome Milichius Pi, about 11 km across

A lunar dome is a type of shield volcano that is found on the surface of the Earth's Moon. They are typically formed by highly viscous, possibly silica-rich lava, erupting from localized vents followed by relatively slow cooling. Lunar domes are wide, rounded, circular features with a gentle slope rising in elevation a few hundred meters to the midpoint. They are typically 8–12 km in diameter, but can be up to 20 km across. Some of the domes contain a small craterlet at the peak.

Some of the domes have been shown to consist of the same materials as the lunar maria. Thus they could be created by some mechanism that differs from the mare-forming flows. It is thought that these domes are formed from a smaller magma chamber that is closer to the surface than is the case for a mare. This results in a lower pressure, and so the lava flows more slowly. The magma wells up through a crack in the surface, but the flow eventually concentrates through one primary vent. This concentration can then result in a vent crater at the peak of the dome.

The cluster of lunar domes at the Marius Hills was considered as a possible landing site of Apollo 15. There are concentrations of lunar domes near the craters Hortensius, and T. Mayer, across the top of Mons Rümker, and in Mare Fecunditatis. Solitary lunar domes are also found, including Kies Pi (π), Milichius Pi (π), Mons Gruithuisen Gamma (γ) and Delta (δ), and domes near the craters Gambart C, Beer, and Capuanus. Omega Cauchy (ω) and Tau Cauchy (τ) form a pair of domes near the crater Cauchy. Likewise near Arago are the domes Arago Alpha (α) and Arago Beta (β). There are two domes south of Mons Esam. The IAU does not currently have rules that establish the naming of lunar domes, but the practice in the professional literature and in lunar sciences is to name the dome with the name of the nearest crater followed by a number that denotes the order of discovery.

== Examples ==
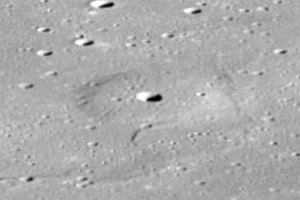
Omega Cauchy, with the small crater Donna at its summit, Mare Tranquillitatis

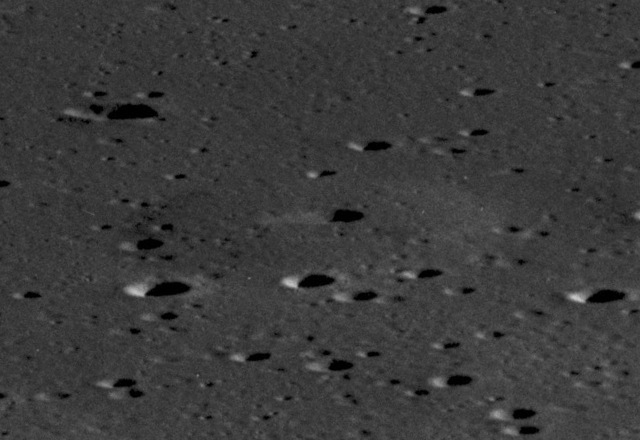
Oblique view of a dome north of Sinas, Mare Tranquillitatis

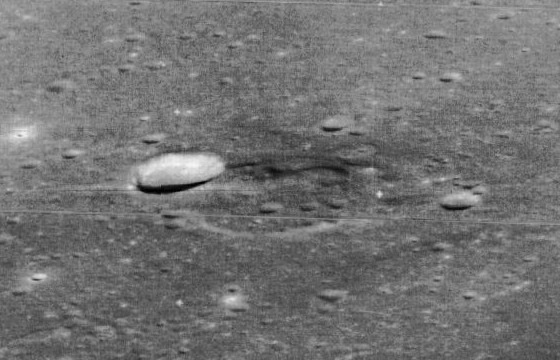
Oblique view of lunar dome near Messier in Mare Fecunditatis. Note dark 'halo' deposits. The crater left of center is unrelated (formed after the dome).

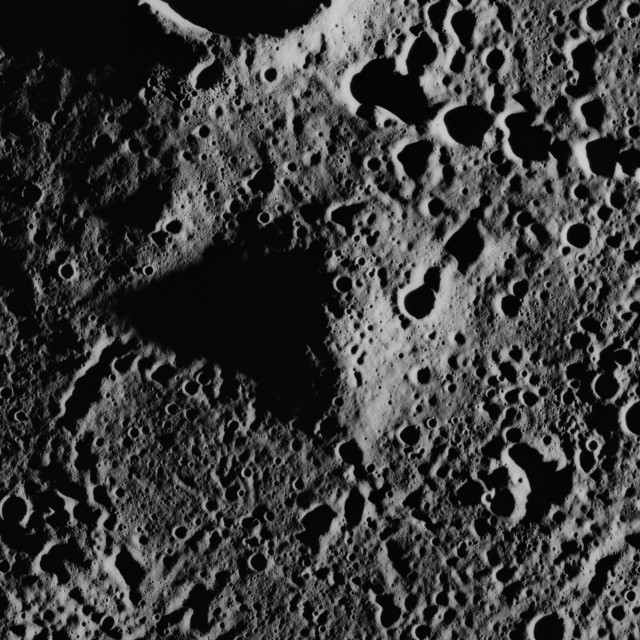
Lunar dome south of Beer, Mare Imbrium

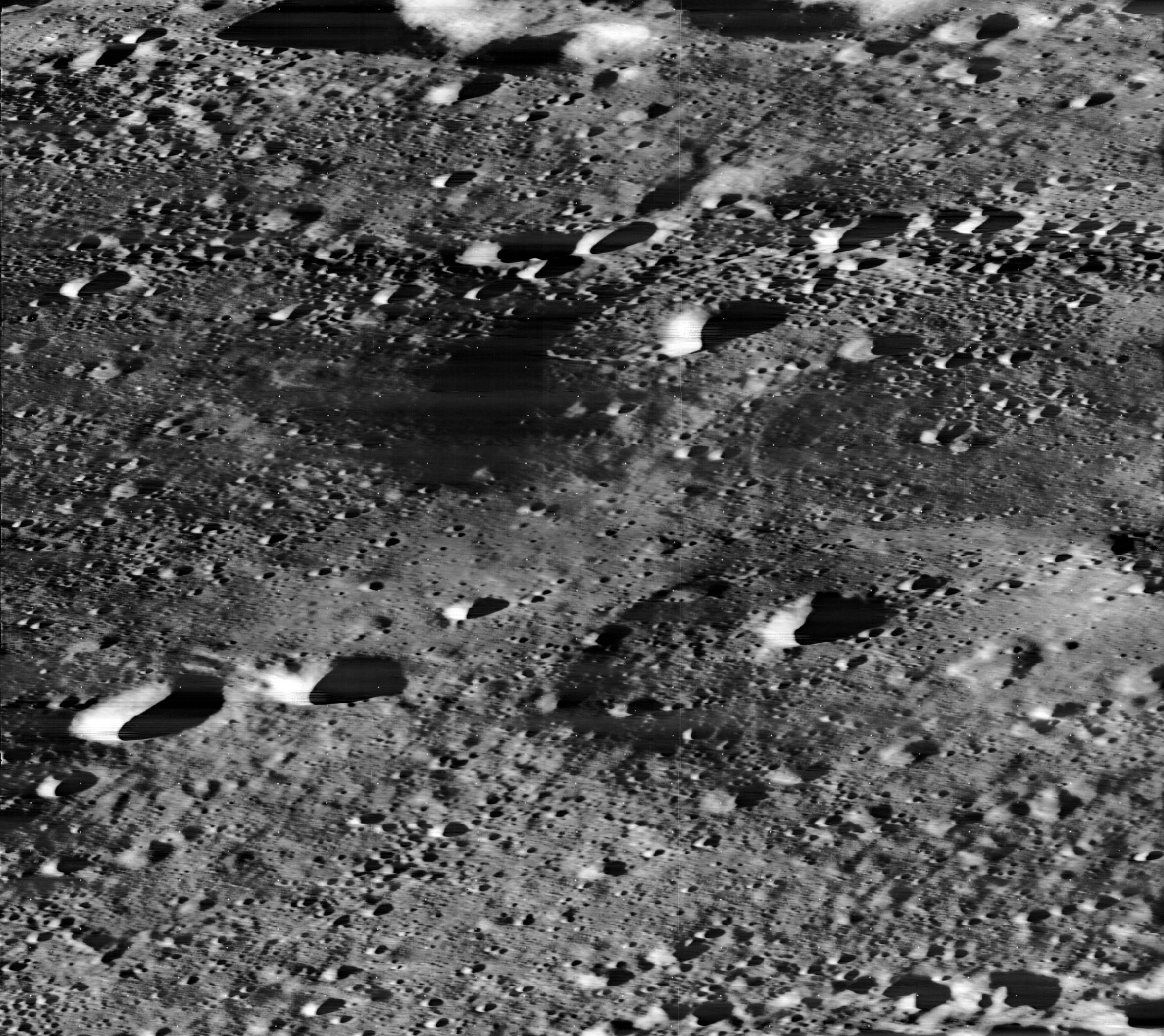
Oblique view of three of the six lunar domes north of Hortensius, from Lunar Orbiter 3

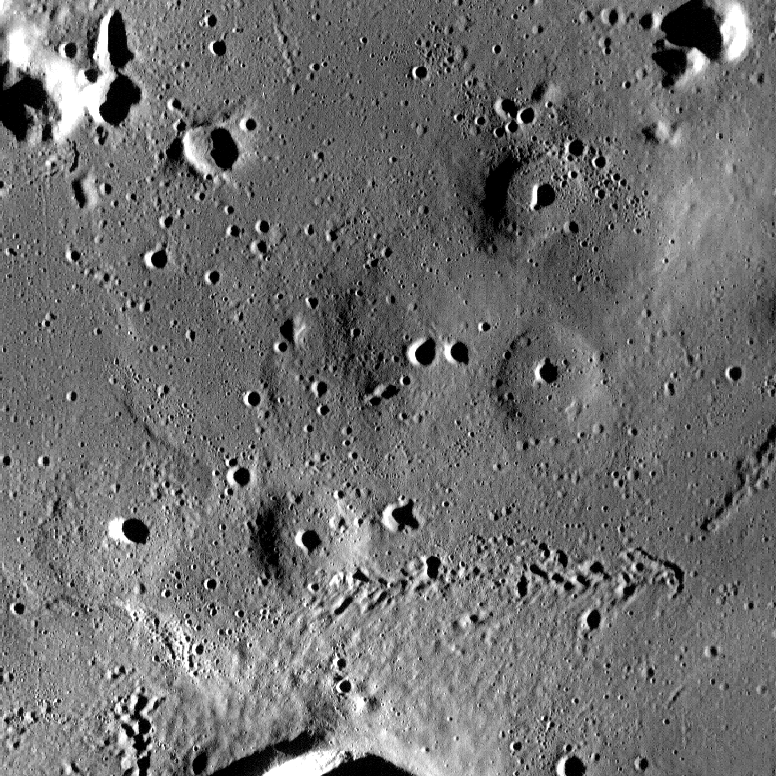
LRO image of the Hortensius domes

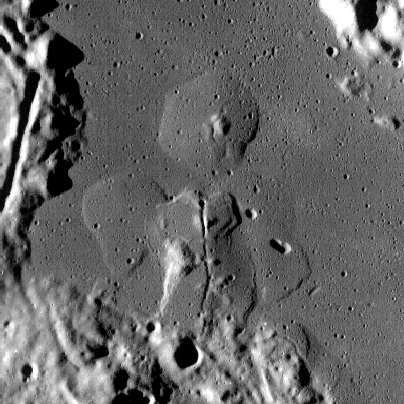
Domes in Lacus Veris, Orientale basin

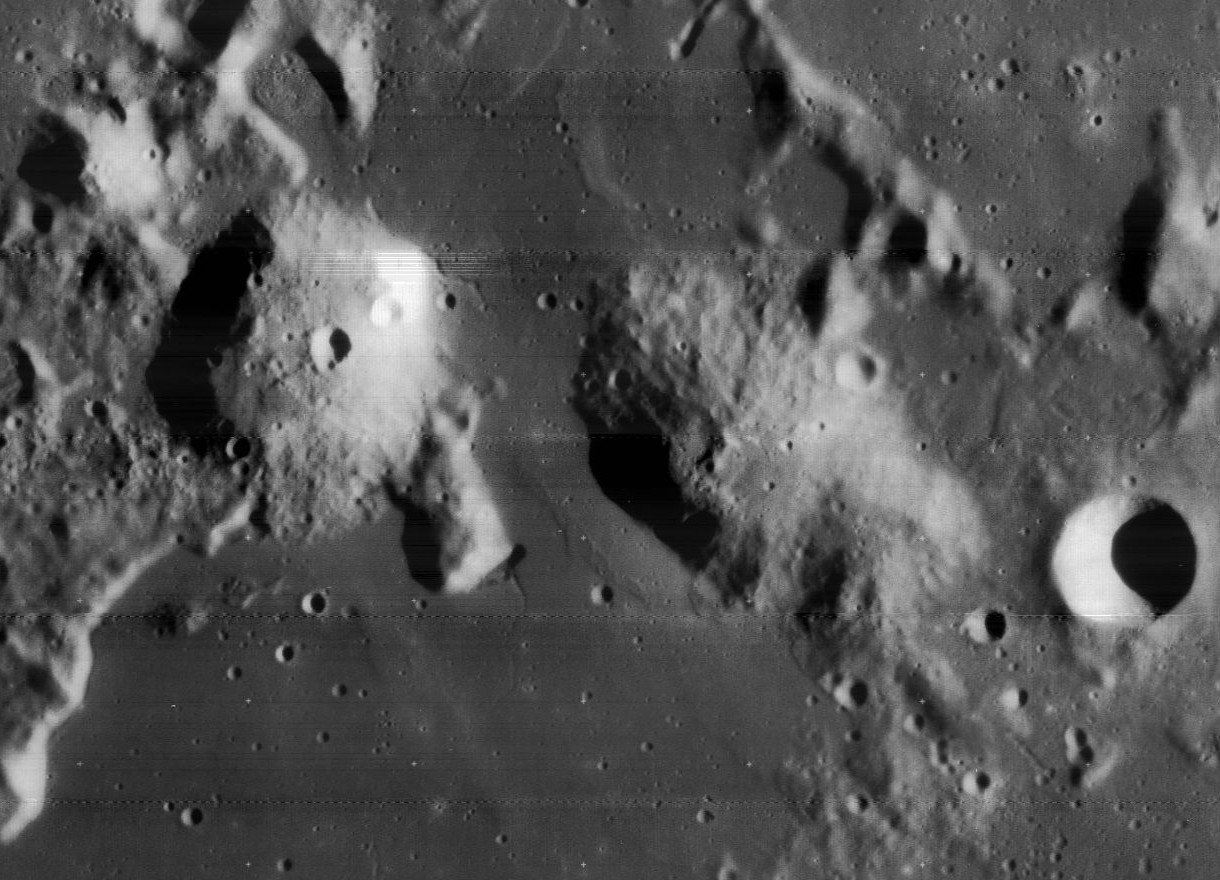
Mons Gruithuisen Gamma (left) and Delta (right), from Lunar Orbiter 4

== See also ==
- Volcanism on the Moon
