= Gruithuisen =

Gruithuisen may refer to:

- Franz von Paula Gruithuisen (1774–1852), Bavarian physician and astronomer
- Gruithuisen (crater), on the Moon
- Gruithuisen Domes (disambiguation), two lunar domes
