= Schröter (lunar crater) =

Crater on the Moon

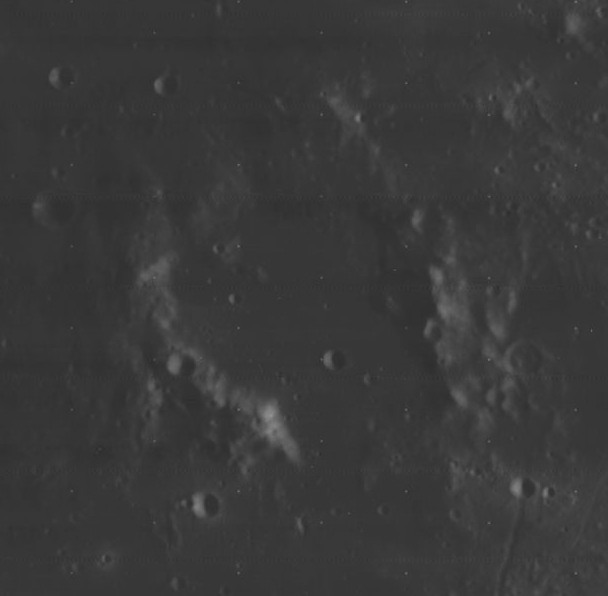
- Lunar Orbiter 4 image
- Coordinates: 2.74°N 6.98°W
- Diameter: 36.67 km (22.79 mi)
- Depth: 0.83 km (0.52 mi)
- Colongitude: 7° at sunrise
- Eponym: Johann H. Schröter

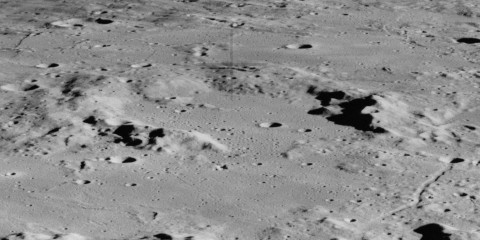
Oblique view from Apollo 16, facing north. Rima Schröter is clearly visible in the lower right corner.

Lunar Orbiter 3 image of Rima Schröter

Schröter is a lunar impact crater near the mid-part of the Moon, on the eastern Mare Insularum. It was named by the IAU in 1935 after German astronomer Johann Hieronymus Schröter. It lies to the north of the craters Sömmering and Mösting.

The rim of Schröter is heavily worn and eroded, with a wide gap in the southern wall and a deep indentation to the southeast. There is no central peak at the crater's midpoint. A widely spaced row of tiny craters forms a line westwards from the north rim of Schröter.

Professor W. H. Pickering produced drawings of this crater displaying eruptions of steam that he believed he witnessed. This transient lunar phenomenon was not confirmed by other observers.

To the north of Schröter, beginning with the satellite crater Schröter W, is a region of irregular terrain. This area includes an array of linear dark surface markings that appear to criss-cross. In the 19th century, Franz von Paula Gruithuisen is noted for claiming that this area contained a lunar city (which he called Wallwerk), based on his observations using a small refracting telescope. This inference was greeted with considerable skepticism by astronomers at the time, and, indeed, subsequent observations with more powerful instruments demonstrated that this was merely a natural feature.

To the southeast of the crater rim is a rille named the Rima Schröter. This cleft begins at a small crater in the mare, then follows a line to the south-southeast.

About 100 km to the west-northwest of Schröter is the crash site of Surveyor 2.

== Satellite craters ==
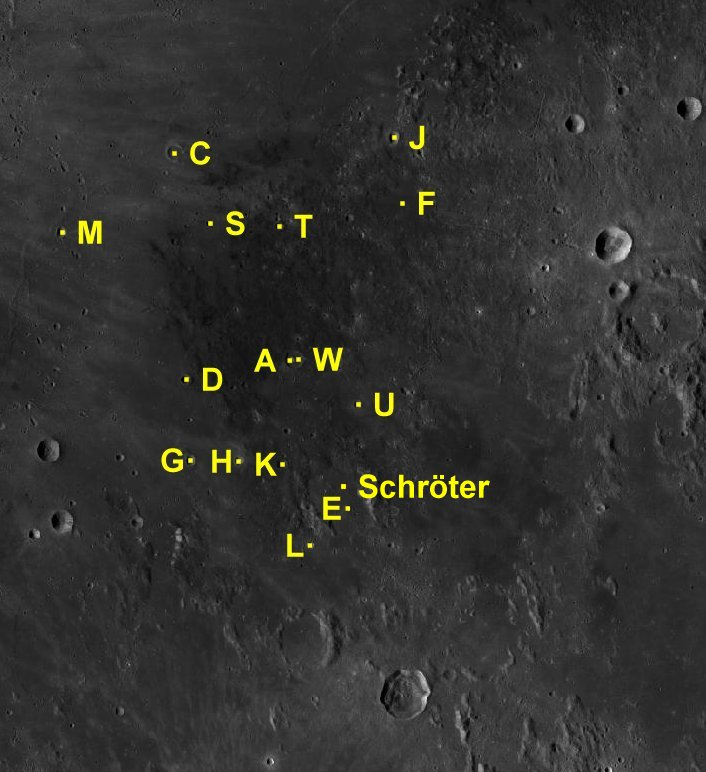
Schröter and its satellite craters

By convention these features are identified on lunar maps by placing the letter on the side of the crater midpoint that is closest to Schröter.

Schröter	Latitude	Longitude	Diameter
A	4.8° N	7.8° W	4 km
C	8.3° N	9.8° W	8 km
D	4.5° N	9.5° W	5 km
E	2.4° N	6.8° W	3 km
F	7.4° N	5.9° W	34 km
G	3.2° N	9.4° W	5 km
H	3.2° N	8.6° W	4 km
J	8.5° N	6.1° W	6 km
K	3.1° N	7.9° W	5 km
L	1.8° N	7.4° W	4 km
M	7.0° N	11.6° W	5 km
S	7.1° N	9.2° W	3 km
T	7.0° N	8.0° W	4 km
U	4.1° N	6.6° W	4 km
W	4.8° N	7.7° W	10 km

== See also ==
- Schröter's Valley - a valley located in the midwest of the lunar Nearside.
