= Walter Bucher =

Walter Bucher may refer to:

- Walter Hermann Bucher (1888–1965), German-American geologist and paleontologist
- Walter Bucher (cyclist) (1926–2025), Swiss cyclist
