= Sömmering (crater) =

Crater on the Moon

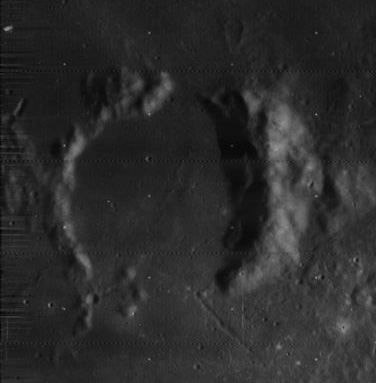
- Lunar Orbiter 4 image
- Coordinates: 0.1°N 7.5°W
- Diameter: 28 km
- Depth: 1.0 km
- Colongitude: 8° at sunrise
- Eponym: Samuel Thomas von Sömmerring

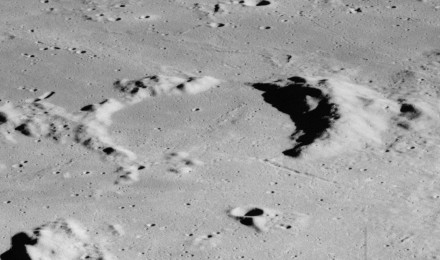
Oblique view from Apollo 16, facing north.

Sömmering is the lava-flooded remains of a lunar impact crater on the eastern edge of the Mare Insularum. It was named after German doctor Samuel Thomas von Sömmerring. To the southeast is the crater Mösting, and north of Sömmering lies a similar flooded crater designated Schröter. A rille designated Rima Schröter runs from the southeast of Schröter towards the east of Sömmering's outer rim.

The western rim of this crater forms a slender arcing rise on the lunar mare, with a wide gap to the south and a narrow gap in the north. The eastern rim is much thicker in girth, and resembles a curved ridge. The interior floor is level and nearly featureless. The open southern end of this crater overlaps the lunar equator.

== Satellite craters ==
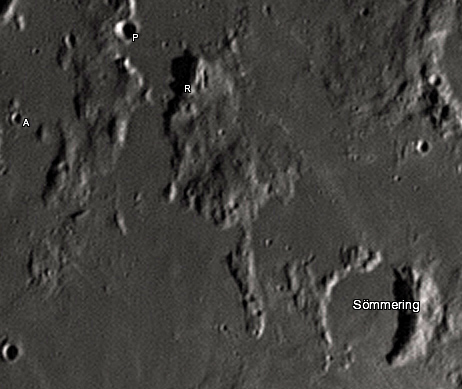
Sömmering crater and its satellite craters taken from Earth in 2012 at the University of Hertfordshire's Bayfordbury Observatory with the telescopes Meade LX200 14" and Lumenera Skynyx 2-1

By convention these features are identified on lunar maps by placing the letter on the side of the crater midpoint that is closest to Sömmering.

Sömmering	Latitude	Longitude	Diameter
A	1.1° N	11.1° W	3 km
P	2.2° N	10.3° W	6 km
R	1.9° N	9.8° W	17 km
