= Mons Gruithuisen Gamma =

Lunar dome

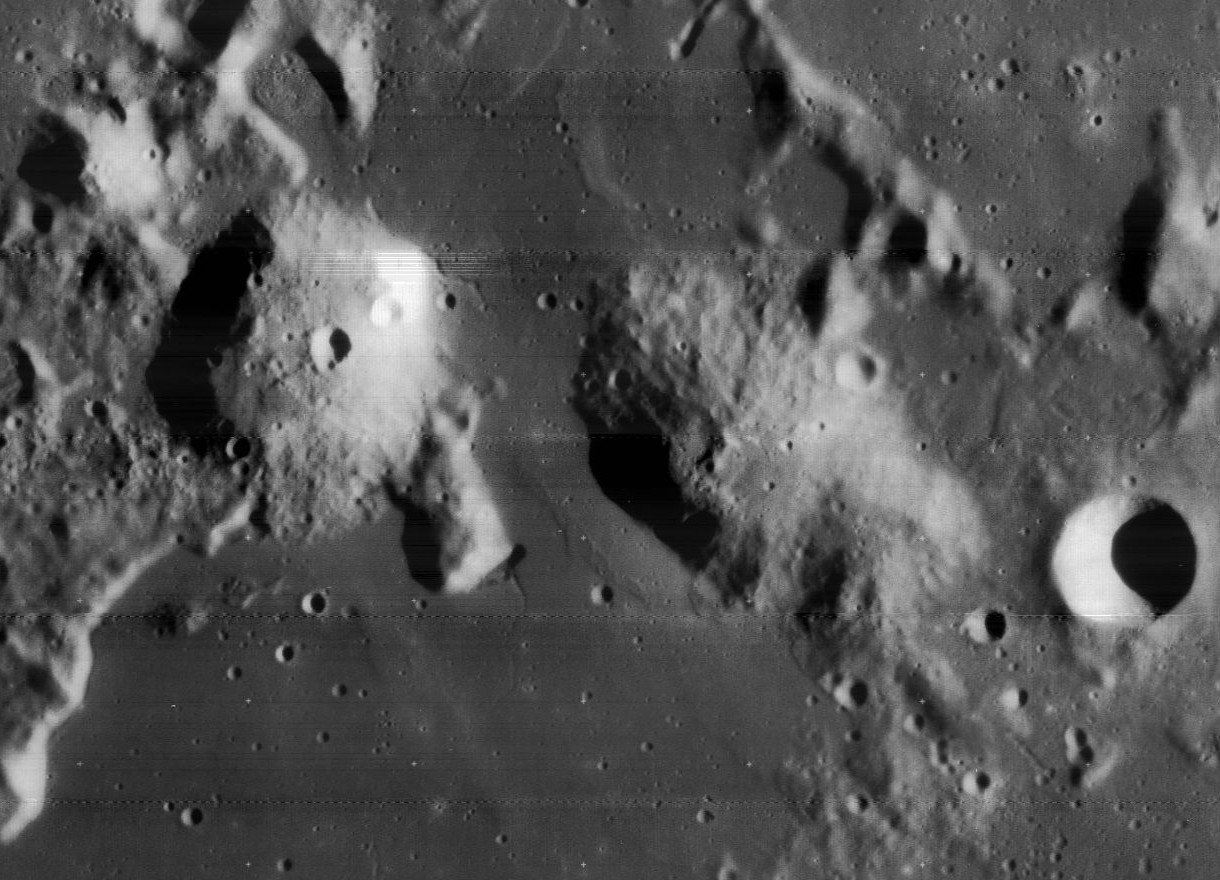
- Mons Gruithuisen Gamma (left) and Delta (right); Lunar Orbiter 4 image

Highest point
- Elevation: 1500 m
- Listing: Lunar mountains
- Coordinates: 36.56°N 40.72°W

Geography
- Location: Near side of the Moon

Geology
- Mountain type: Lunar dome

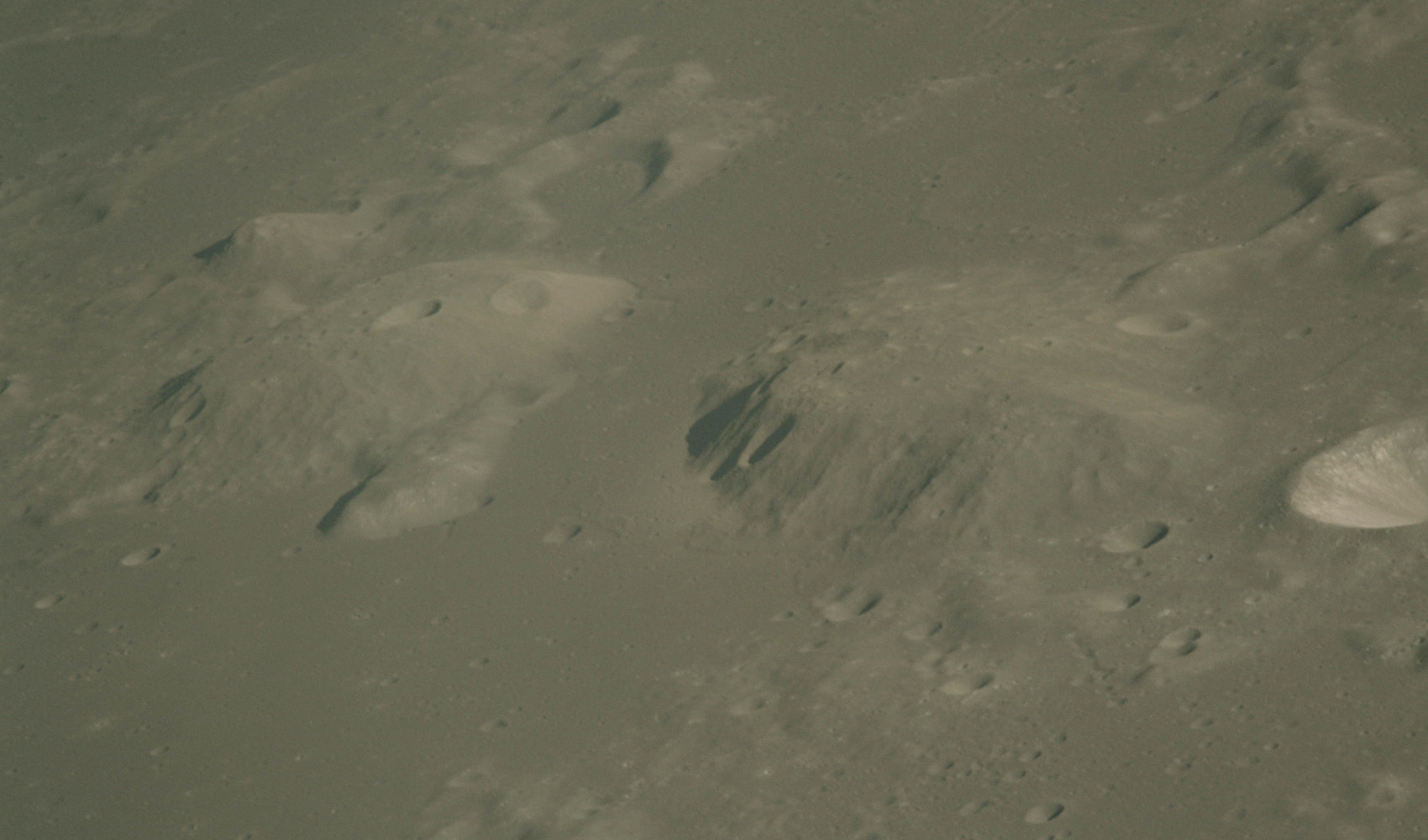
Oblique view from Apollo 15

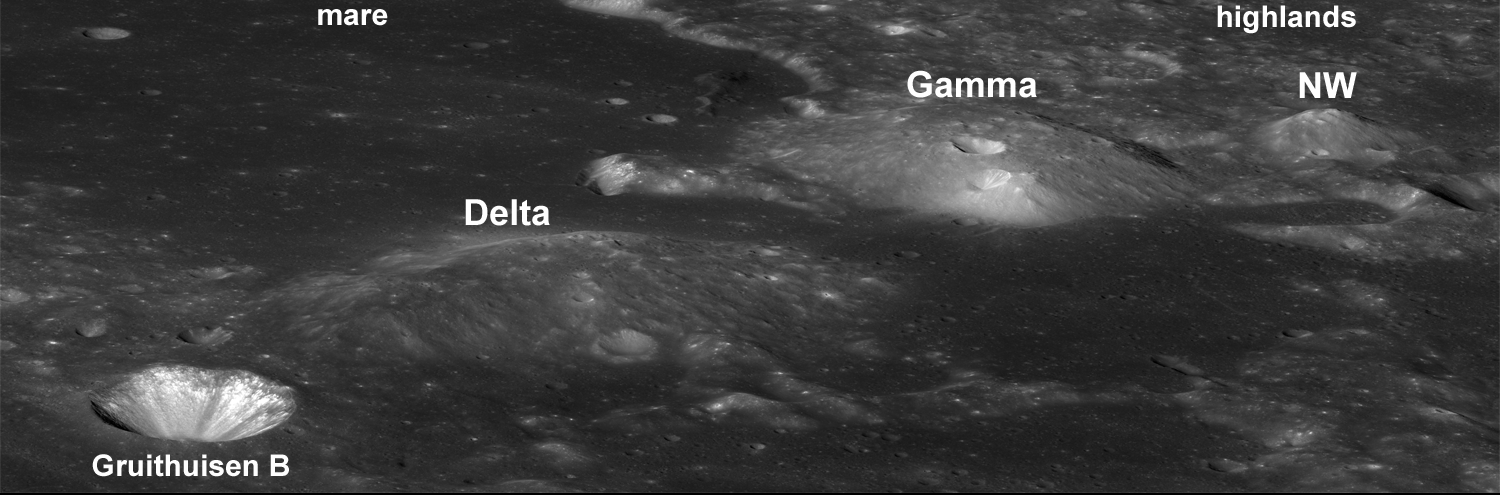
Oblique view from LRO

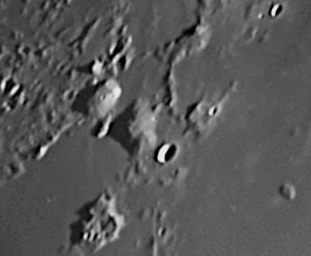
Gruithuisen Gamma, Delta and North-West domes as viewed from Earth.

Mons Gruithuisen Gamma (γ) is a lunar dome that lies to the north of the crater Gruithuisen at the western edge of the Mare Imbrium.

The dome has a diameter of 20 km and climbs gently to a height of over 1500 meters. At the summit is a small crater.

To the east lies the similar Mons Gruithuisen Delta (δ). Together they are often informally called the Gruithuisen domes. To the south of the Gruithuisen domes is a portion of Oceanus Procellarum that was named Sinus Viscositatis by the International Astronomical Union (IAU) in December 2022.

Mons Gruithuisen Gamma was expected to be the landing site for Peregrine Mission One, which launched on January 8, 2024, on the maiden flight of the Vulcan Centaur rocket. The mission failed due to a leaky valve, precluding any attempt at landing.

Firefly Aerospace plans to use a Blue Ghost lander to deploy a rover at Gruithuisen Gamma in 2028 as part of NASA's Commercial Lunar Payload Services program. Lunar-VISE instruments on the lander and rover will map local variations in geological compositions and thermophysical properties

A small (150 m diameter) crater located near the summit of Mons Gruithuisen Gamma was named Mareta by the IAU in June 2025.

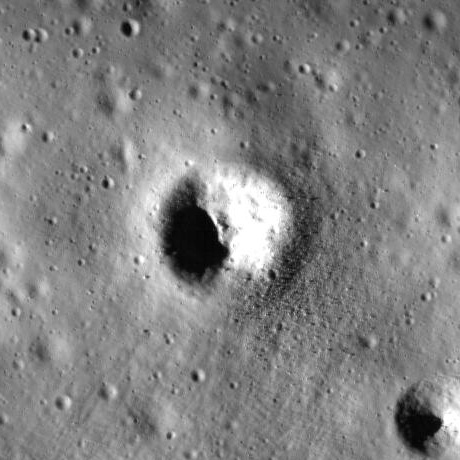
Mareta crater

== See also ==
- List of mountains on the Moon
- Mareta West
- Volcanism on the Moon
