= Mons Gruithuisen Delta =

Mountain on the Moon

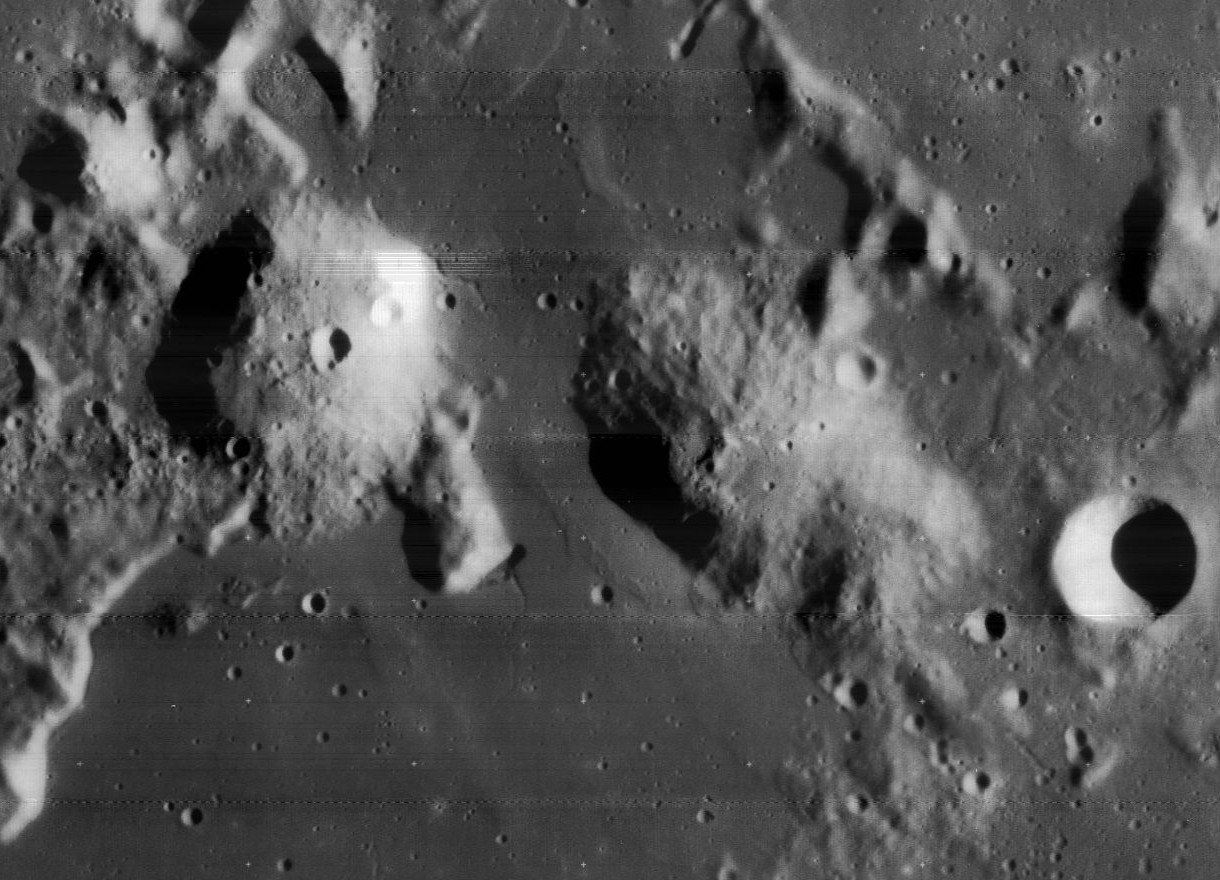
- Mons Gruithuisen Gamma (left) and Delta (right); Lunar Orbiter 4 image

Highest point
- Elevation: 1800 m
- Listing: Lunar mountains
- Coordinates: 36.07°N 39.59°E

Geography
- Location: Near side of the Moon

Geology
- Mountain type: Lunar dome

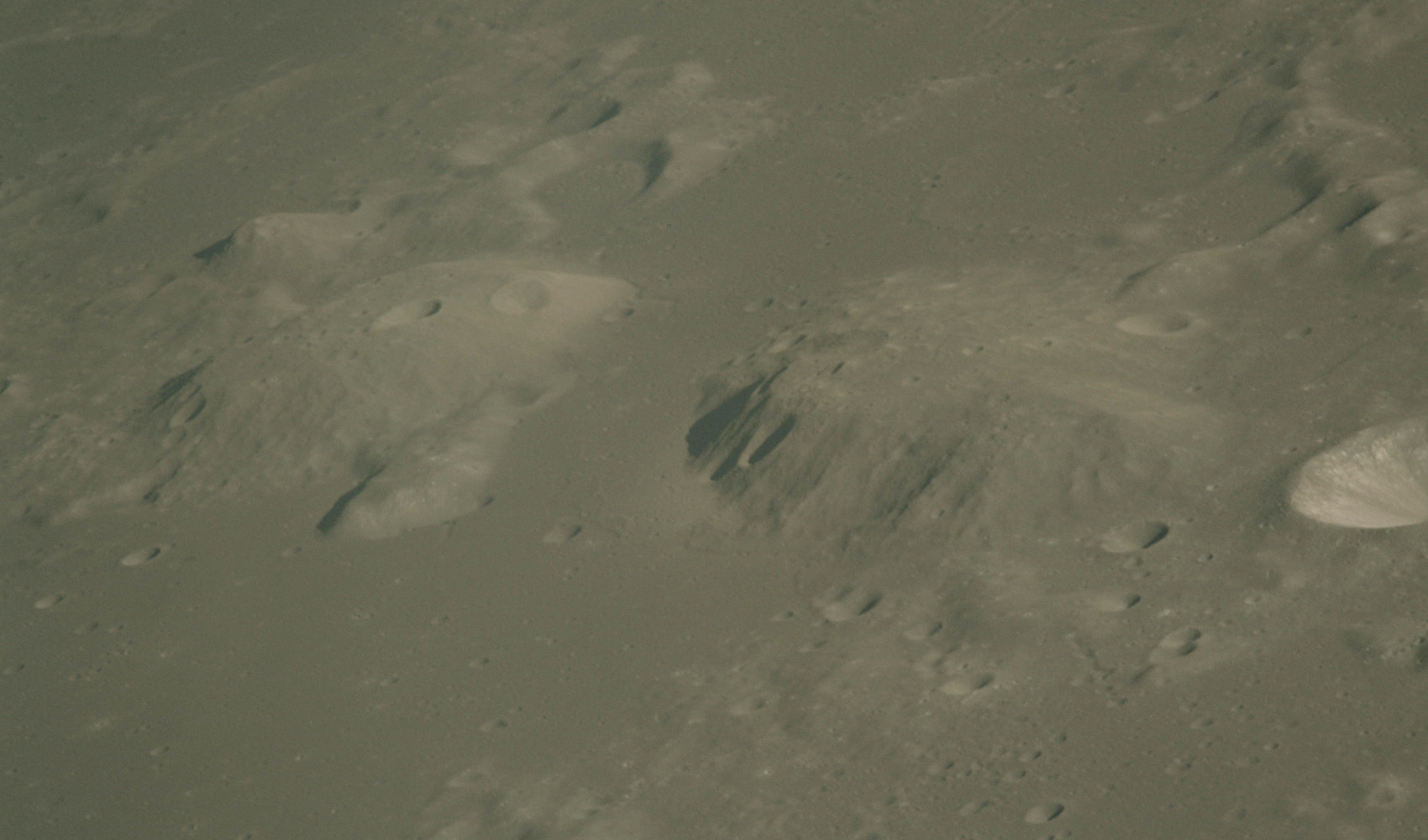
Oblique view from Apollo 15

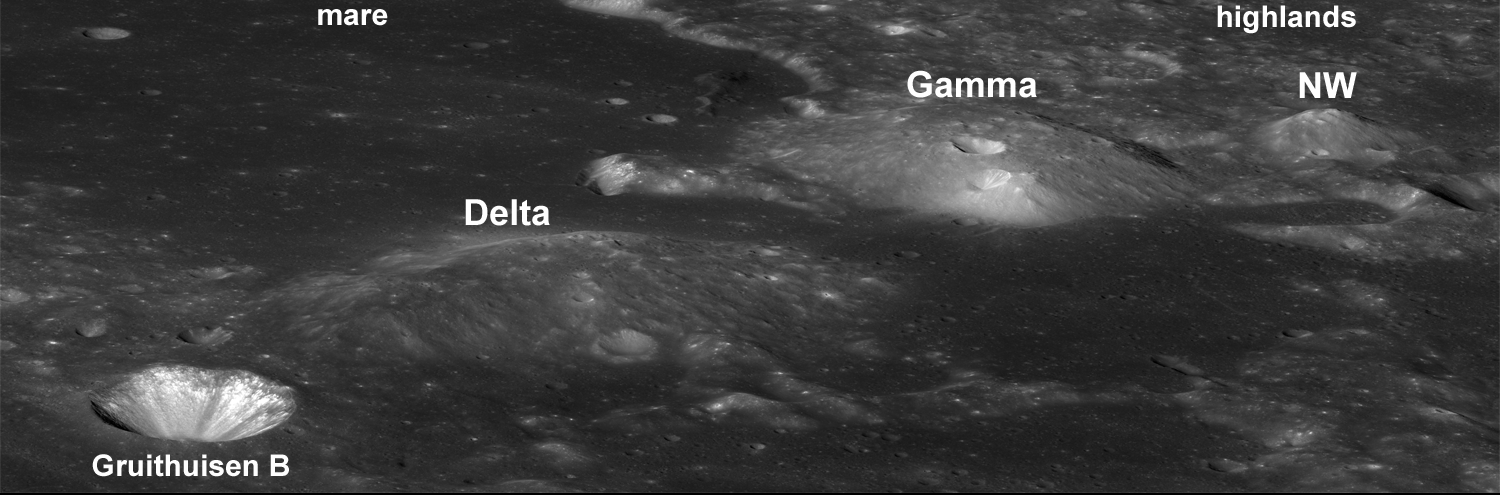
Oblique view from LRO

Mons Gruithuisen Delta is a mountain of the surface of the Moon. It is located north of Gruithuisen crater, east of Mons Gruithuisen Gamma. It has an altitude of about 1800 meters and a diameter of about 27 kilometers. The name, given in 1935, was named after Franz von Paula Gruithuisen, a German astronomer.

The mountain has an extremely low bulk density of 2150±150 kg/m^{3}.

== See also ==
- Volcanism on the Moon
