= Gruithuisen (crater) =

Crater on the Moon

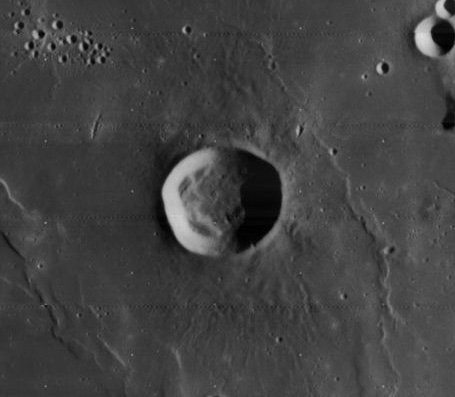
- Lunar Orbiter 4 image
- Coordinates: 32.9°N 39.7°W
- Diameter: 16 km
- Depth: 1.9 km
- Colongitude: 40° at sunrise
- Eponym: Franz von Paula Gruithuisen

Gruithuisen is a lunar impact crater that lies on the section of lunar mare that joins Oceanus Procellarum in the west to Mare Imbrium in the east. Southeast of Gruithuisen is the small crater Delisle. To the south is Dorsum Bucher, a wrinkle ridge running in a north–south direction for about 90 kilometers.

The rim of Gruithuisen is relatively smooth and circular, projecting only slightly above the surrounding mare. The interior is relatively featureless with a small floor, with mounds of material deposited along the edges of the sloping inner walls.

To the north of the crater, along the edge of the highland peninsula between the two maria is a domed mountainous rise that is designated Mons Gruithuisen Gamma (γ). Just to the east of this feature is another mountainous rise named Mons Gruithuisen Delta (δ). Northwest of Gruithuisen crater is concentrated cluster of several craterlets, which was most likely formed from a single body that broke up just prior to impact.

== Satellite craters ==
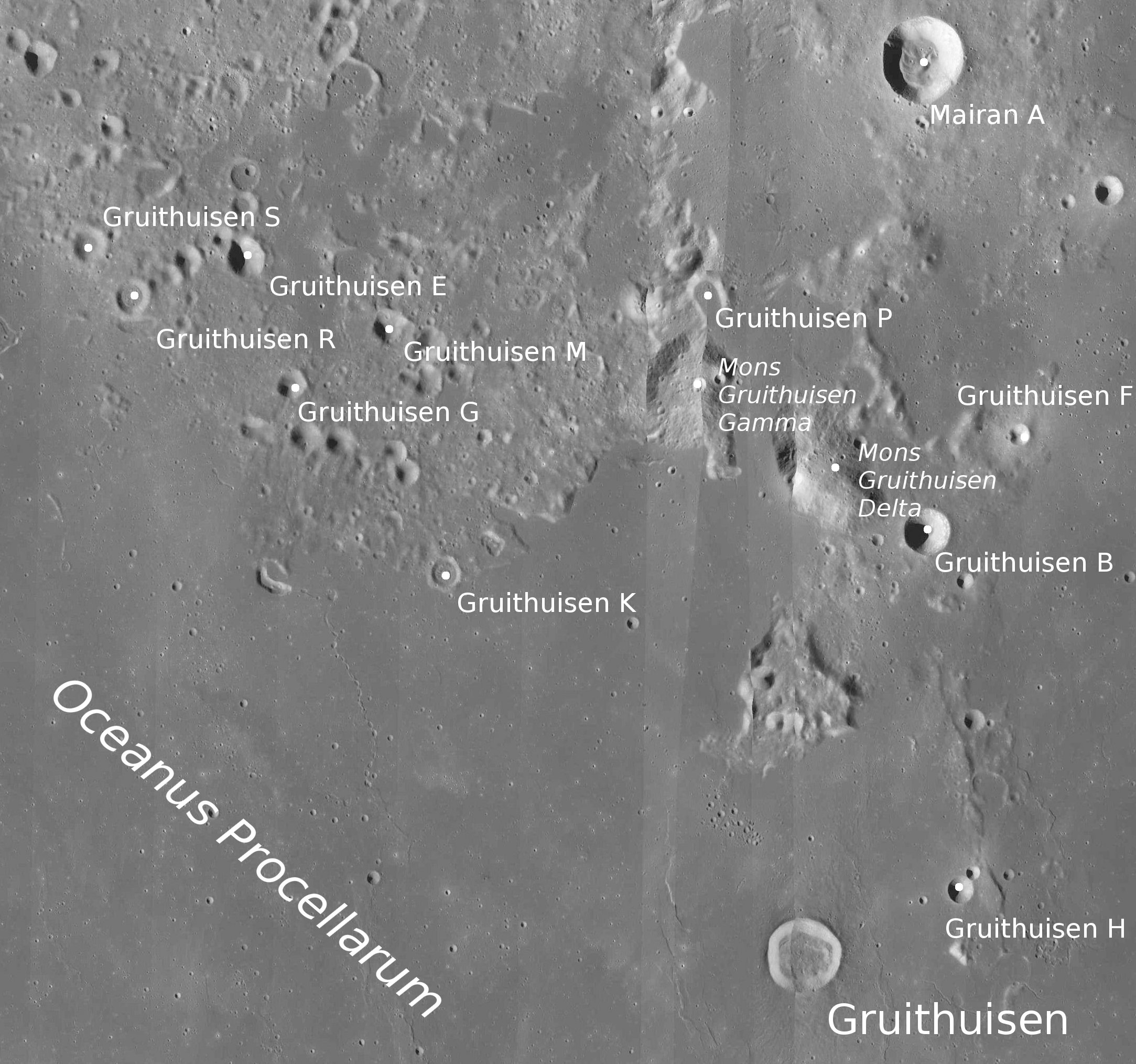
Gruithuisen with satellite features (detail of LRO - WAC global moon mosaic; Mercator projection)

By convention these features are identified on lunar maps by placing the letter on the side of the crater midpoint that is closest to Gruithuisen.

Gruithuisen	Latitude	Longitude	Diameter
B	35.6° N	38.8° W	9 km
E	37.3° N	44.3° W	8 km
F	36.3° N	37.9° W	4 km
G	36.6° N	43.9° W	6 km
H	33.3° N	38.4° W	6 km
K	35.3° N	42.7° W	6 km
M	36.9° N	43.2° W	7 km
P	37.1° N	40.5° W	11 km
R	37.1° N	45.3° W	7 km
S	37.5° N	45.6° W	7 km

Gruithuisen K is a concentric (double-walled) crater. There is what appears to be a collapsed lava tube nearby.

== Gallery ==
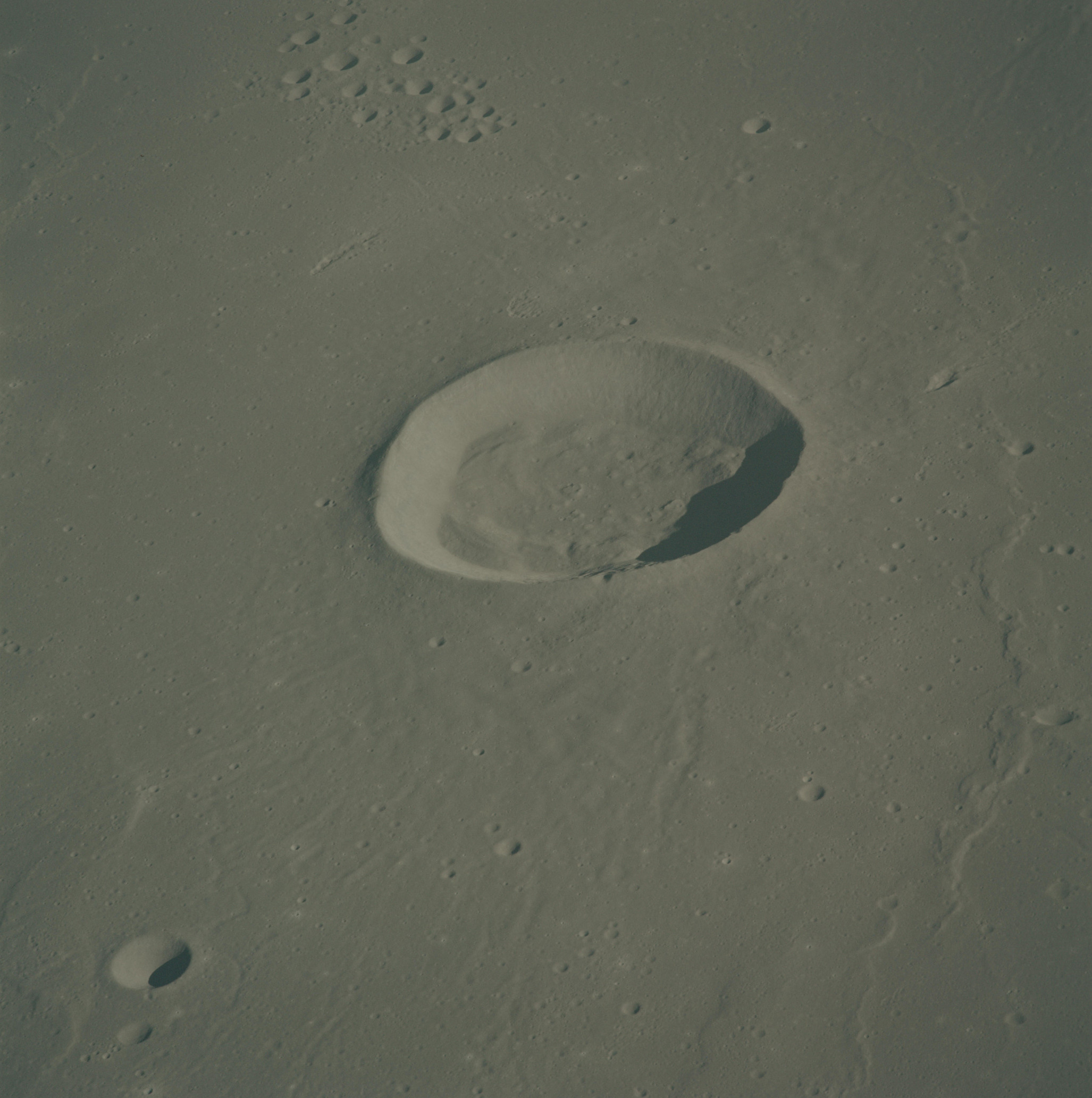
Oblique view from Apollo 15. NASA photo.

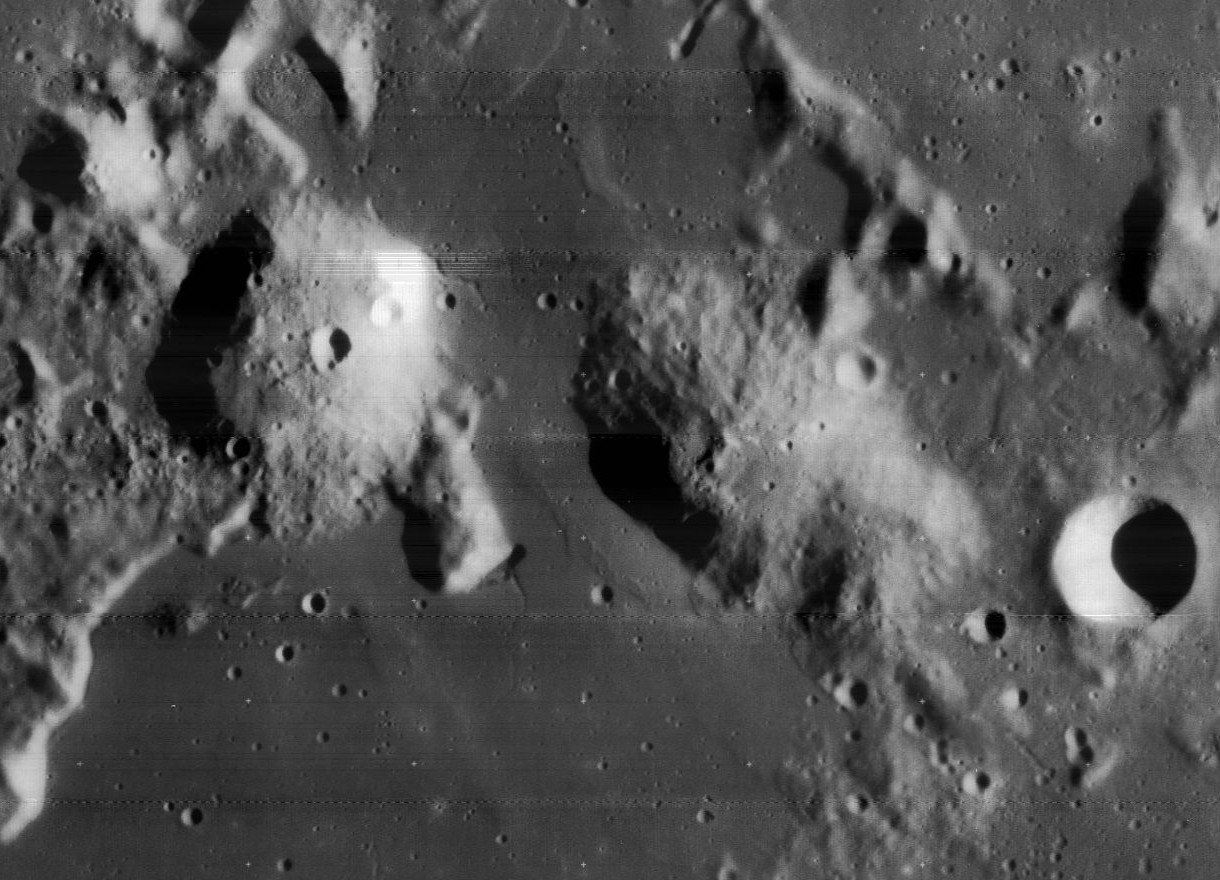
Lunar Orbiter 4 image of Mons Gruithuisen Delta (right) and Gamma (left)
