= Dorsum Bucher =

Wrinkle ridge on the Moon

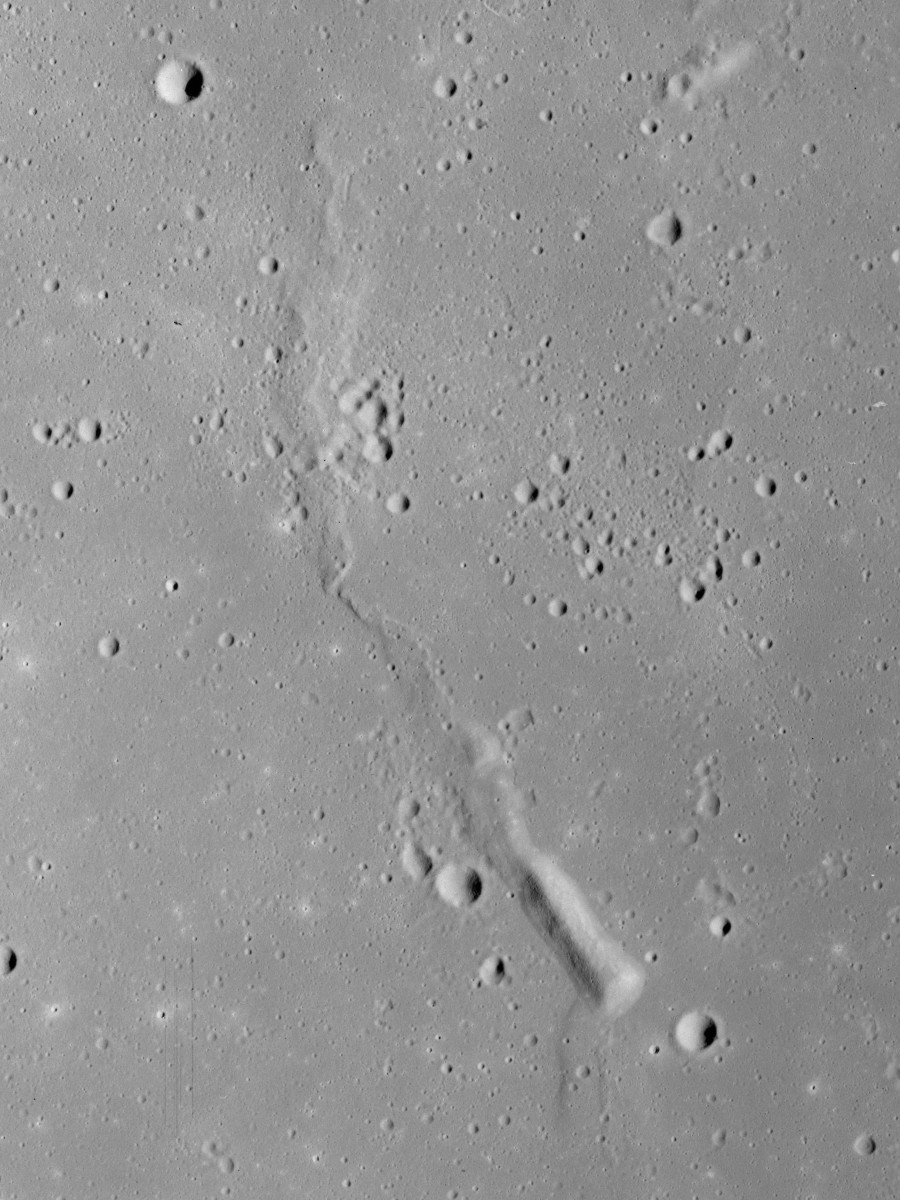
Southern Dorsum Bucher

Dorsum Bucher is a wrinkle ridge at 31.0°N 39.0°W in the border region between Oceanus Procellarum and Mare Imbrium on the Moon. The name of the feature was approved by the IAU in 1976. It is approximately 85 km long, extending from the vicinity of Gruithuisen crater to the area west of Delisle crater. The south end of the dorsum is a low hill of terra material that predates the mare lava.

The ridge was named after Walter Hermann Bucher, a German-American geologist and paleontologist.
