= Sinus Viscositatis =

Plain on the Moon

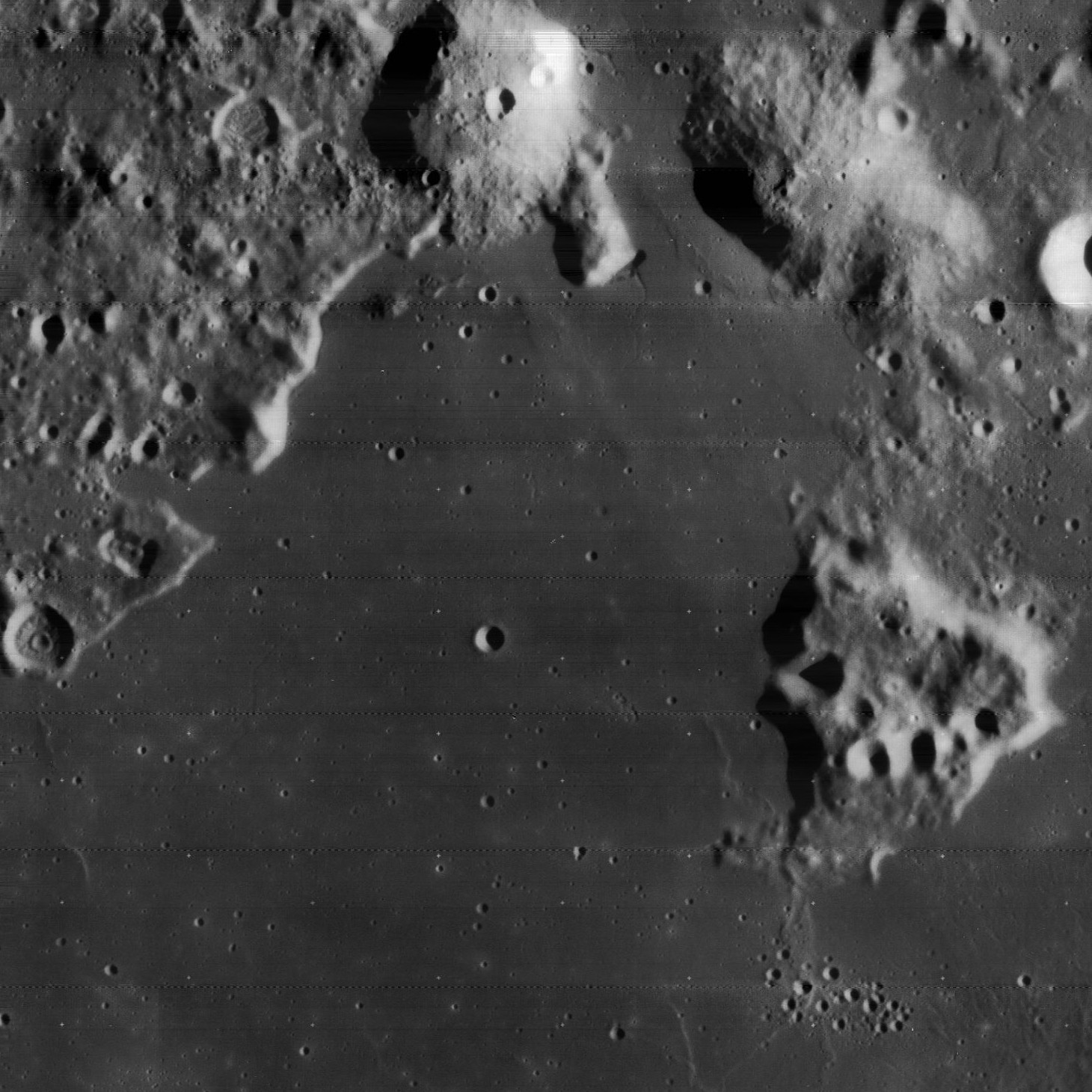
Sinus Viscositatis

Sinus Viscositatis, or the Bay of Stickiness is plain on the moon, named in 2022. It is 68 kilometers in diameter and bounded to the north by highlands containing two silicic Gruithuisen Domes, while towards the southwest it opens up to Oceanus Procellarum. The site contains a series of Gruithusien Domes, steep-sided volcanic mountains.
