= Walter Hermann Bucher =

American paleontologist

- Born: 12 March 1888; Akron, Ohio, United States
- Died: 17 February 1965 (aged 76); Houston, Texas, USA
- Known for: Theory of the Earth's pulsation
- Awards: Bownocker Medal (1938); William Bowie Medal (1955); Leopold-von-Buch-Plakette (1955); Penrose Medal (1960)

Academic background
- Education: University of Heidelberg
- Thesis: (1911)

Academic work
- Discipline: Geology
- Institutions: Columbia University, University of Cincinnati (United States)
- Notable students: Arthur K. Gilkey

Walter Hermann Bucher (March 12, 1888 – February 17, 1965) was a German-American geologist and paleontologist.

He was born in Akron, Ohio, to Swiss-German parents. The family then returned to Germany, where he was raised.

In 1911 he was awarded a Ph.D. by the University of Heidelberg with a focus on geology and paleontology. The same year he returned to the U.S. and joined the University of Cincinnati as a lecturer. By 1924 he was a professor of geology at the institution.

His early works were on paleontology, and he performed studies of stromatolettia, oolites, and ripple-shaped markings. Later he concentrated on the Earth's crust diastrophism problem and proposed firstly (immediate and independent with Mikhail Tetyaev) the pulsation hypothesis of the Earth developing.

In 1935 he became president of the Ohio Academy of Sciences. In 1940 he joined the Columbia University, specializing in structural geology. It is thought that at this time he worked as a consultant on the Manhattan Project, hypothesizing how the detonation of the atomic bomb could affect the Earth's crust. In the same year he joined the National Research Council, as a consultant as chairman of the Division of Geology and Geography. In 1946 he was elected president of the New York Academy of Sciences, and from 1950 until 1953 he served as president of the American Geophysical Union. He was also president of the Geological Society of America (1955) and received their Penrose Medal in 1960.

From 1920 onward, Bucher was noted for his studies in cryptovolcanic structures, significant deformations of the crust of the Earth, and structural geology.

He died in Houston, Texas.

== Bibliography ==
- W. H. Bucher, "The Deformation of the Earth's Crust", Princeton University Press, Princeton, 1933.
- Bucher, Walter H. (1939). "Deformation of the earth's crust". Geological Society of America Bulletin. 50 (3): 421–432. Bibcode:1939GSAB...50..421B. doi:10.1130/gsab-50-421.
- Bucher, W. H., Caster, K. E. and Jones, S. M., "Elementary guide to the fossils and strata in the vicinity of Cincinnati", 1945, Cincinnati Museum of Natural History.
- W. H. Bucher, "Role of gravity in orogenesis", Geological Society of America Bulletin, 1956.
- W. H. Bucher, "The pattern of the Earth's mobile belts", Journal of Geology, 1924. doi:10.1086/623094

== Awards and honors ==
- Bownocker Medal of the Geological Sciences Department of the Ohio State University, 1938
- William Bowie Medal of the American Geophysical Union, 1955
- Leopold von Buch Medal of the Deutsche Geologische Gesellschaft, 1955
- Penrose Medal of the Geological Society of America, 1960
- The Walter H. Bucher Medal of the American Geophysical Union was named after him.
- The lunar wrinkle-ridge system called Dorsum Bucher was named after him.

== See also ==
- Impact crater
