= Gruithuisen Domes =

The Gruithuisen Domes may refer to:

- Mons Gruithuisen Delta, a lunar dome
- Mons Gruithuisen Gamma, a lunar dome
