= John Adams Bownocker =

- Born: 11 March 1865; Pickaway County, United States
- Died: 20 October 1928 (aged 63); Amanda Township, Fairfield County, Ohio
- Education: Ohio State University
- Spouse: Anna K. Flint
- Scientific career
- Fields: Geology
- Workplaces: Ohio State University (Boston)
- Thesis: (1897)

Dr. John Adams Bownocker (March 11, 1865 – October 20, 1928) was an American geologist and educator.

== Biography ==
Born in St. Paul Pickaway County, Ohio to parents Michael Bownocker and Eliza (Adams) Bownocker.

Married Anna K. Flint on June 12, 1911.

Died in Columbus Franklin County, Ohio and was buried at Amanda Township, Fairfield County, Ohio Cemetery.

== Education and career ==
Attended Ohio State University, 1883–89, receiving a degree as Bachelor of Science, in June 1889. He attended the University of Ohio from 1889 to 1892 and held various positions in the Geology Department at the Ohio State University. Finally he held the position of Professor of Inorganic Geology, and was also State Geologist of Ohio.

John Adams Bownocker received a degree as Doctor of Science in 1897 and was a Professor and State Geologist at Ohio State University.

He wrote numerous articles and books in the field of Geology. He was a Fellow of the Geological Society of America and also a Fellow of the American Association for the Advancement of Science.

One of the founders of Association of American State Geologists.

The "Bownocker Medal" is awarded by the advanced geologists.

== Bibliography ==
- John Adams Bownocker "The occurrence and exploitation of petroleum and natural gas in Ohio", Columbus : Geological Survey of Ohio, 1903.
- John Adams Bownocker, "Building Stones of Ohio", 1915.
- John Adams Bownocker, "The Bremen Oil Field", 1910.
- John Adams Bownocker, "The coal fields of the United States: General Introduction", 1929.
