= Mösting (crater) =

Crater on the Moon

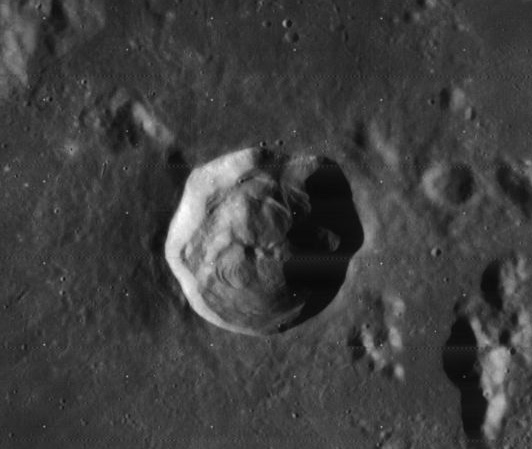
- Lunar Orbiter 4 image
- Coordinates: 0.7°S 5.9°W
- Diameter: 26 km
- Depth: 2.8 km
- Colongitude: 6° at sunrise
- Formation: Copernican
- Eponym: Johan S. von Mösting

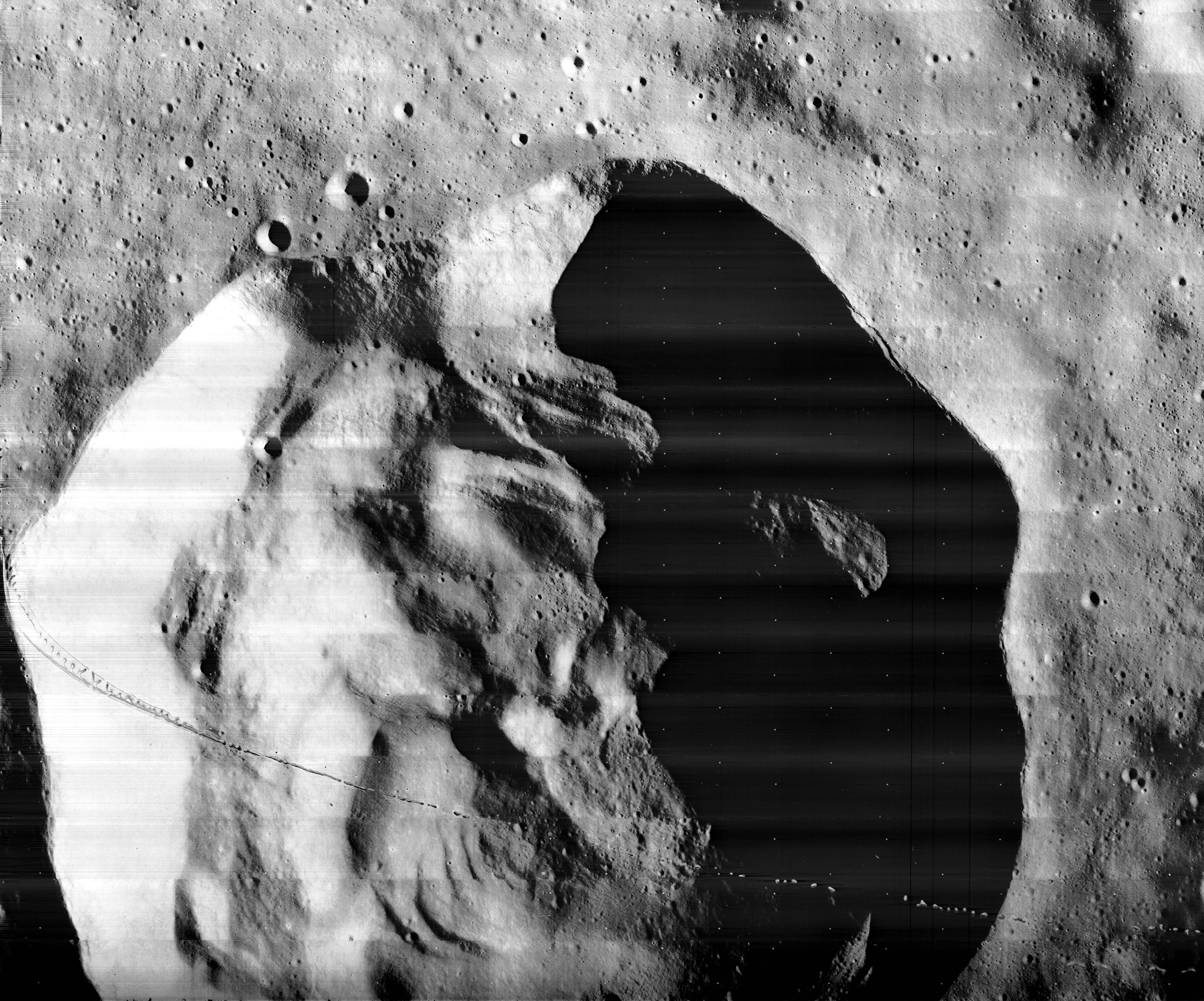
Closeup of Mösting from Lunar Orbiter 3

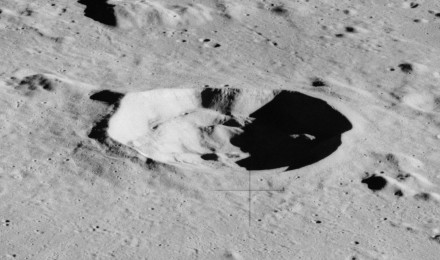
Oblique view from Apollo 16, facing north.

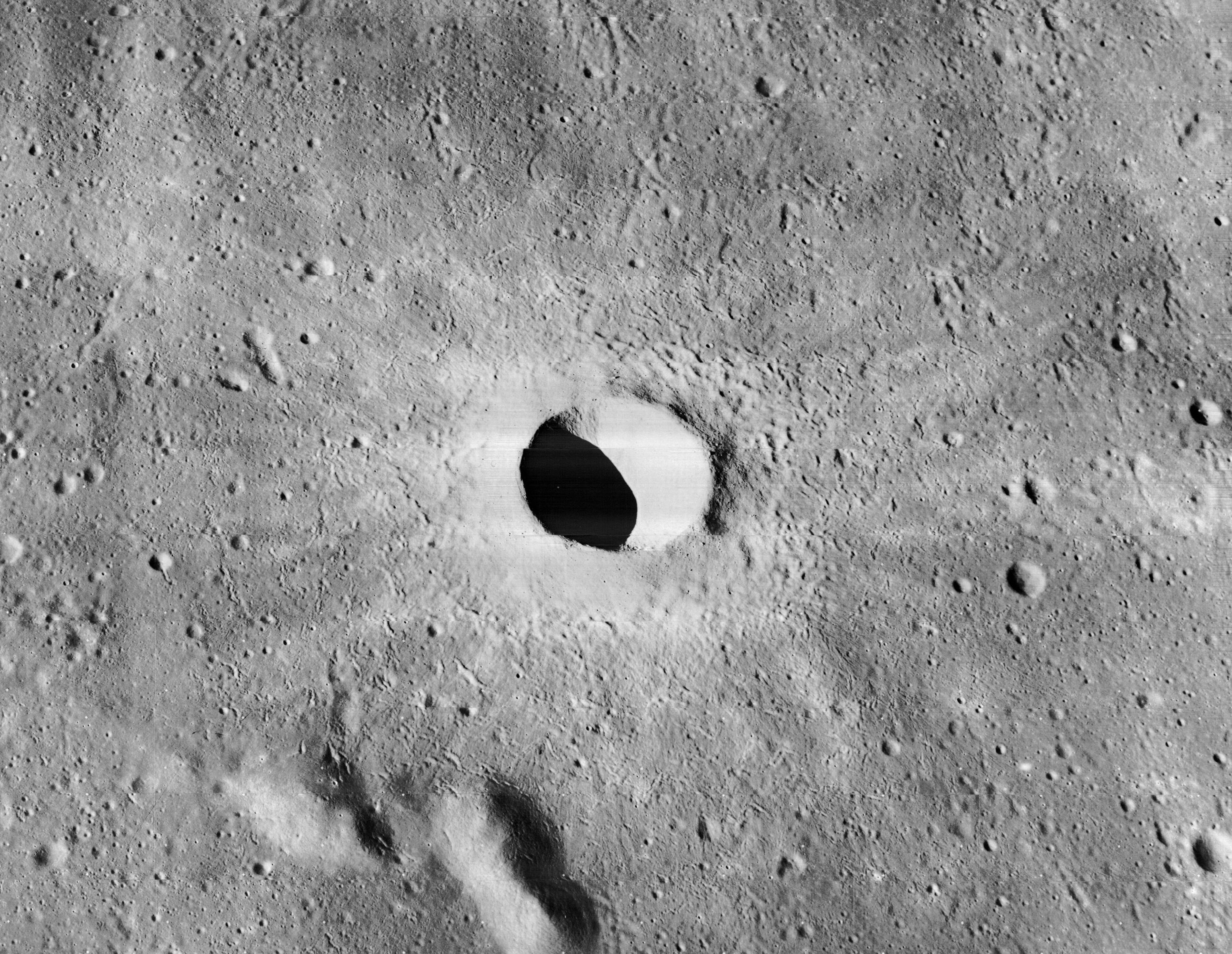
The rayed crater Mösting C, from Lunar Orbiter 3

Mösting is a small lunar impact crater that is located in the southeastern fringes of the Mare Insularum. It was named after Danish benefactor Johan Sigismund von Mösting. The ruined crater Sömmering lies to the northwest. To the southeast is the large crater-bay of Flammarion. Mösting has a terraced inner wall and a small central hill at the midpoint of the floor.

To the south-southeast lies the bowl-shaped Mösting A. This small feature formed the fundamental location in the selenographical coordinate system. It was defined as having the following coordinates:

Latitude:	3° 12' 43.2" South
Longitude:	5° 12' 39.6" West

Later the coordinate system became even more precisely defined using the Lunar Laser Ranging Experiment.

== Mösting A during full moon ==
Mösting A looks very bright and almost pure white during full moon. Its brightness is also noticeable on the photographic version of chart LAC 77 (page 154) in The Clementine Atlas of the Moon (Ben Bussey / Paul D. Spudis). As with many of these young high albedo bowl-shaped craters, Mösting A shows bright inner slopes and a dark floor. This combination looks like a staring eye with white iris and black pupil.

== Satellite craters ==
By convention these features are identified on lunar maps by placing the letter on the side of the crater midpoint that is closest to Mösting.

Mösting	Latitude	Longitude	Diameter
A	3.2° S	5.2° W	13 km
B	2.7° S	7.4° W	7 km
C	1.8° S	8.0° W	4 km
D	0.3° S	5.1° W	7 km
E	0.3° N	4.6° W	44 km
K	0.7° S	7.4° W	3 km
L	0.6° S	3.4° W	3 km
M	1.3° S	4.3° W	31 km
U	3.2° S	6.6° W	18 km
