= Franz von Paula Gruithuisen =

Bavarian astronomer (1774–1852)

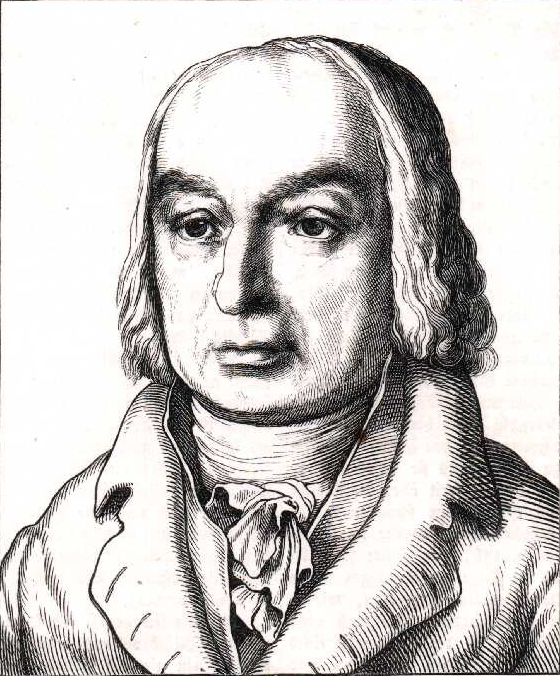
Franz von Gruithuisen

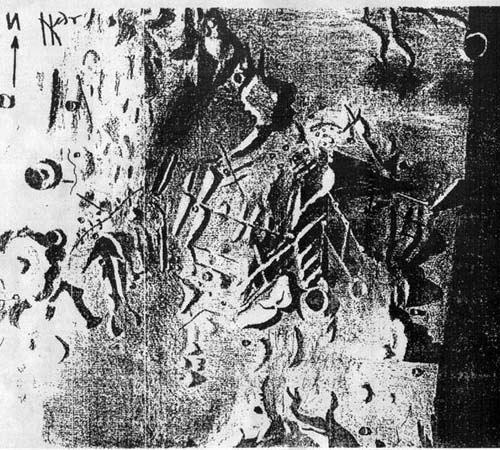
Gruithuisen's drawing of Wallwerk, north of Schröter crater on the Moon.

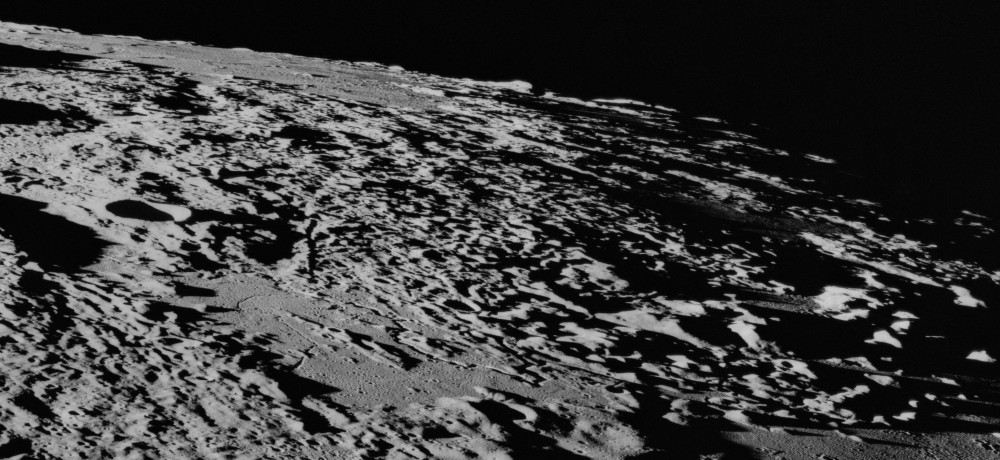
The vicinity of the Moon where the alleged Wallwerk is located. The crater Bode B is at left, and the crater Schröter is near the central horizon, facing south from the Apollo 17 command/service module America. The sunlight strikes the ground from the left, similar to the lighting thought to be optimal for observing the features of Wallwerk. Only low, naturally occurring hills are visible.

Franz von Paula (Franciscus de Paula) Gruithuisen (19 March 1774 – 21 June 1852) was a Bavarian physician and astronomer. He taught medical students before becoming a professor of astronomy at the Ludwig-Maximilians-Universität München in 1826.

During his period of medical studies and instruction, he was noted for his contributions to urology and lithotripsy. He developed ideas on safer methods to remove bladder stones transurethrally, and his instruments served as models for subsequent devices.

Like others before and since his time, Gruithuisen believed that the Earth's Moon was habitable. He made multiple observations of the lunar surface that supported his beliefs, including his announcement of the discovery of a city in the rough terrain to the north of Schröter crater he named the Wallwerk. This region contains a series of somewhat linear ridges that have a fishbone-like pattern, and, with the small refracting telescope he was using, could be perceived as resembling buildings complete with streets. He published his observations in 1824, but they were greeted with much skepticism by other astronomers of the time. His claims were readily refuted using more powerful instruments. Gruithuisen was also the first to suggest that craters on the Moon were caused by meteorite impacts.

He is also noted for the discovery of bright caps on the cusps of the crescent Venus, which he attempted to explain by proposing that jungles on Venus grew more rapidly than in Brazil due to the proximity of the planet to the Sun, and that as a consequence the planet's inhabitants celebrated fire festivals during which they burned massive amounts of vegetation.

Gruithuisen lived at 24 Brienner Straße in Munich shortly before his death. The crater Gruithuisen on the Moon is named for him. Gruithuisen and his theories are mentioned in one of Giacomo Leopardi's Small Moral Works: Dialogo della Terra e della Luna (Dialogue between the Earth and the Moon). He is also mentioned in "De la Terre à la Lune" by Jules Verne.

== Bibliography ==
Baron von Gruithuisen was noted for his prolific rate of publication.

- Ueber die Existenz der Empfindung in den Köpfen und Rümpfen der Geköpften und von der Art, sich darüber zu belehren (Augsburg 1808)
- Ueber die Natur der Kometen, mit Reflexionen auf ihre Bewohnbarkeit und Schicksale, 1811.
- Discovery of Many Distinct Traces of Lunar Inhabitants, Especially of One of Their Colossal Buildings, 1824.
- Der Mond und seine Natur, 1844
