= Selenographic coordinate system =

Coordinate system used on the Moon

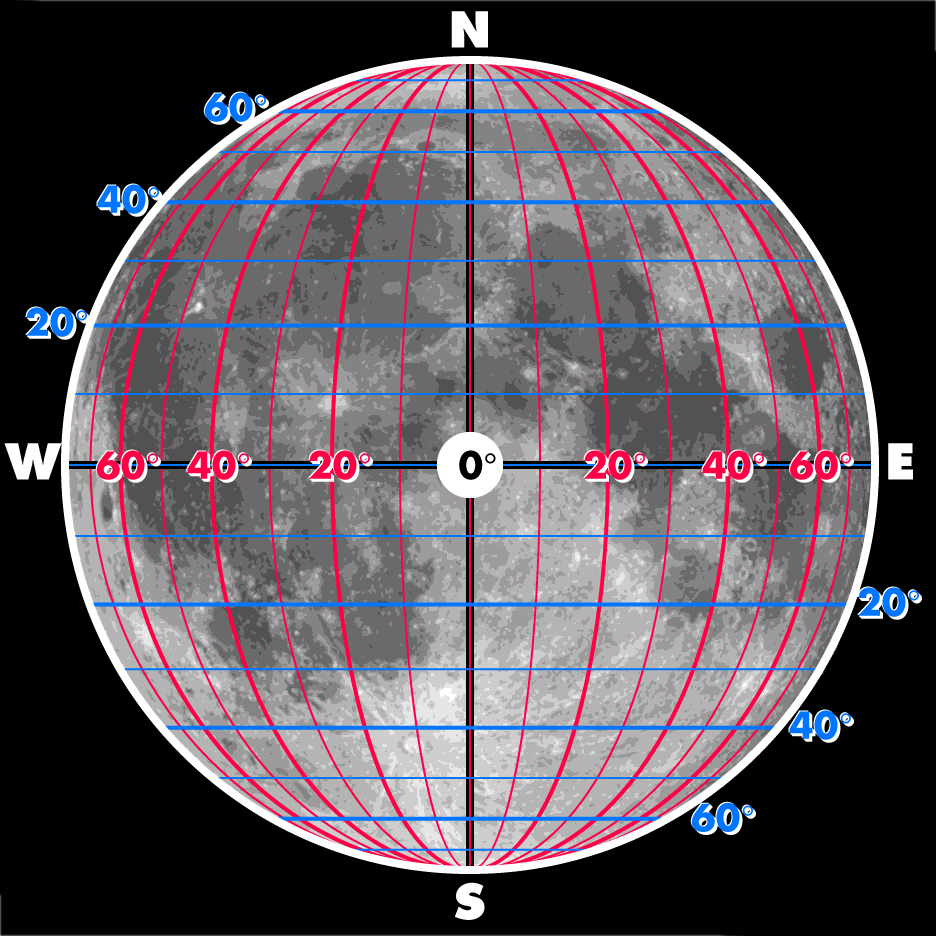
Near side of the moon

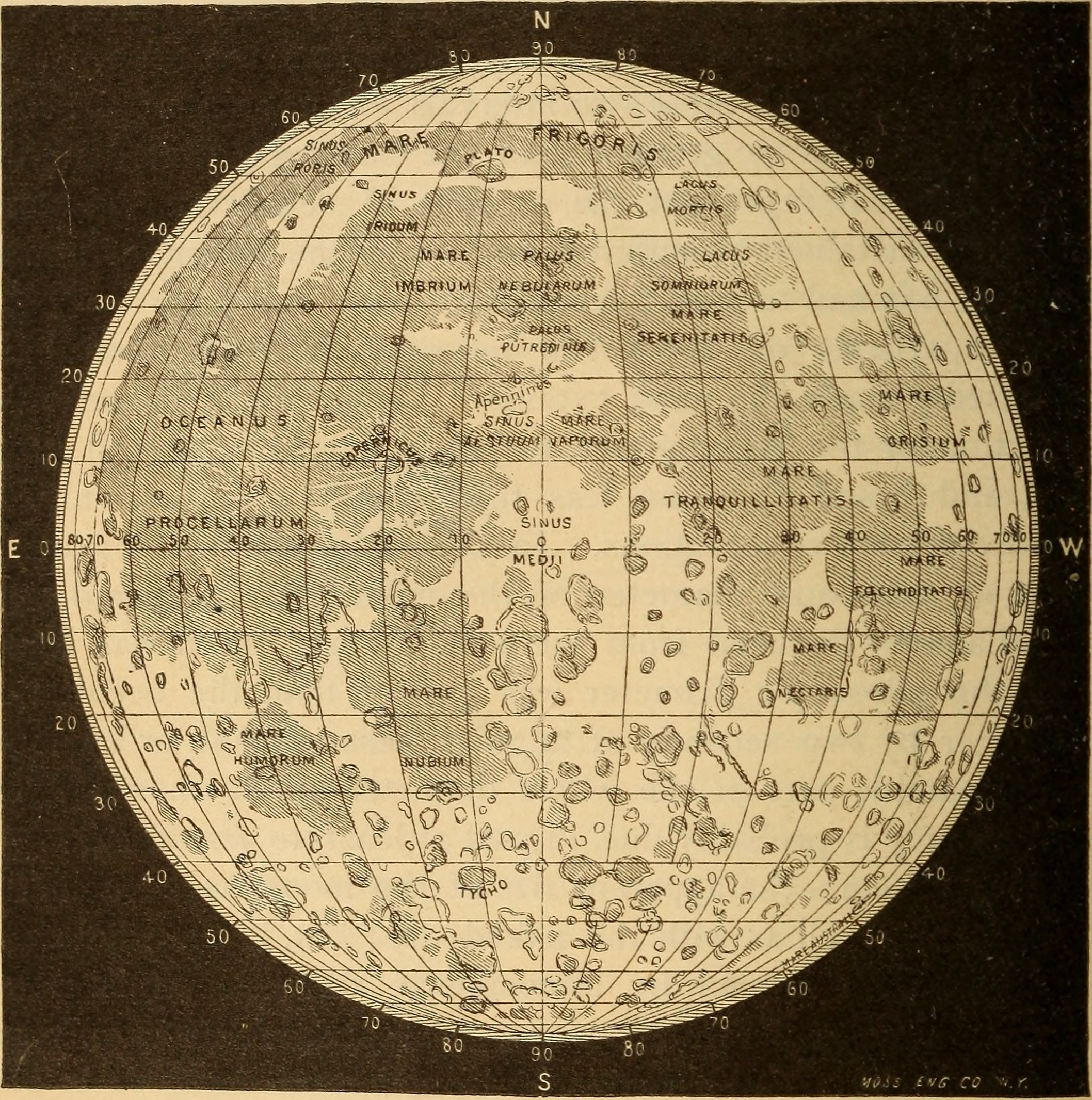
Chart of lunar maria with lines of longitude and latitude.

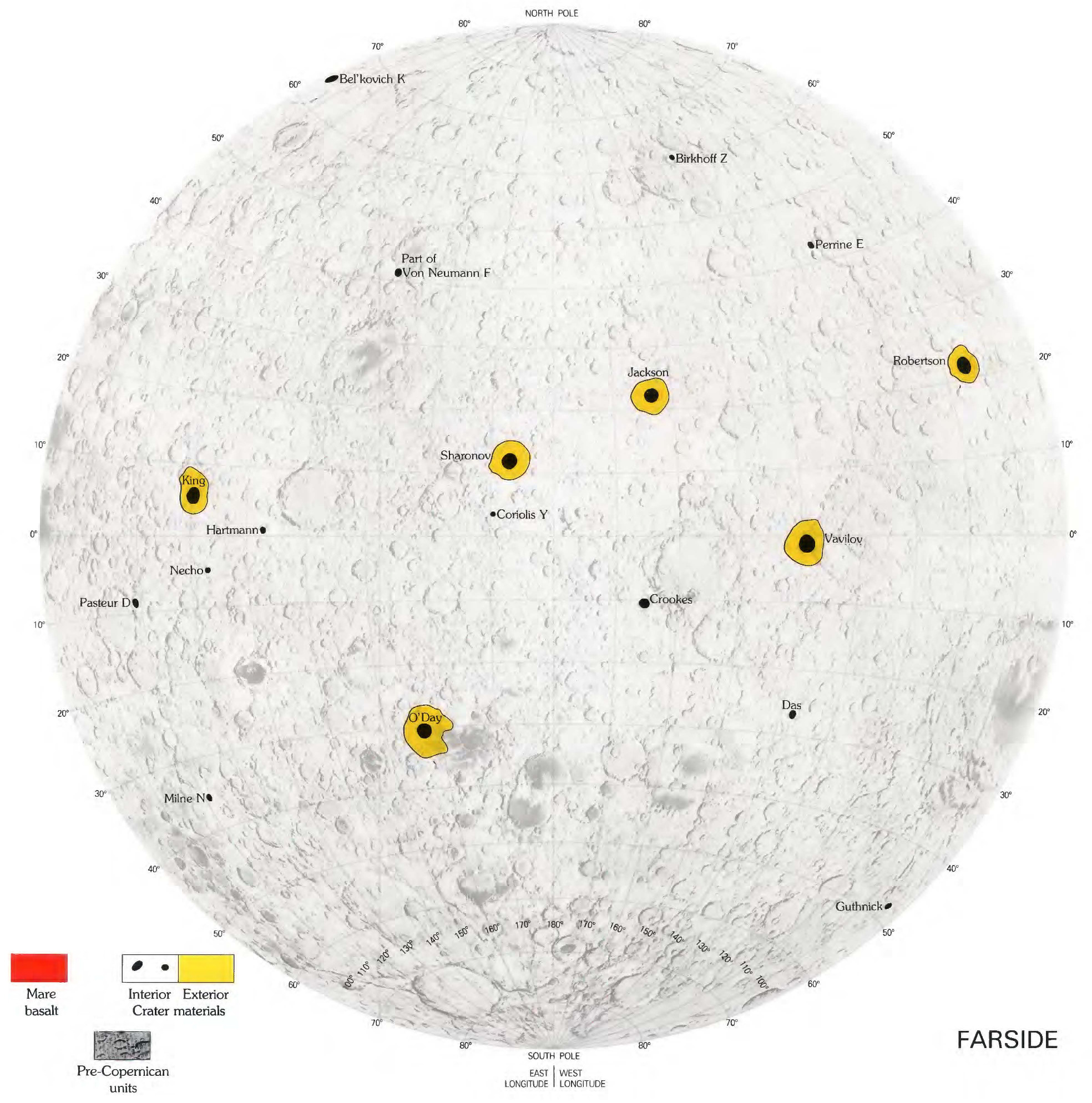
Chart of the far side of the moon with lines of longitude and latitude.

The selenographic coordinate system is used to refer to locations on the surface of Earth's moon. Any position on the lunar surface can be referenced by specifying two numerical values, which are comparable to the latitude and longitude of Earth. The longitude gives the position east or west of the Moon's prime meridian, which is the line passing from the lunar north pole through the point on the lunar surface directly facing Earth to the lunar south pole. (See also Earth's prime meridian.) This can be thought of as the midpoint of the visible Moon as seen from the Earth. The latitude gives the position north or south of the lunar equator. Both of these coordinates are given in degrees.

Astronomers defined the fundamental location in the selenographic coordinate system by the small, bowl-shaped satellite crater 'Mösting A'. The coordinates of this crater are defined as:

Latitude:	3° 12' 43.2" South
Longitude:	5° 12' 39.6" West

Later, the coordinate system has become more precisely defined due to the Lunar Laser Ranging Experiment.

Anything past 90°E or 90°W would not be seen from Earth, except for libration, which makes 59% of the Moon visible.

== Longitude ==
Longitude on the Moon is measured both east and west from its prime meridian. When no direction is specified, east is positive and west is negative.

Roughly speaking, the Moon's prime meridian lies near the center of the Moon's disc as seen from Earth. For precise applications, many coordinate systems have been defined for the Moon, each with a slightly different prime meridian. The IAU recommends the "mean Earth/polar axis" system, in which the prime meridian is the average direction (from the Moon's center) of the Earth's center.

== Selenographic colongitude ==
The selenographic colongitude is the longitude of the morning terminator on the Moon, as measured in degrees westward from the prime meridian. Hence, for the crater Plato with a longitude of 9.3° W, its typical colongitude is 9° at sunrise. However, this value can vary by up to ±3° depending on the effects of libration. The morning terminator forms a half-circle across the Moon where the Sun is just starting to rise. As the Moon continues in its orbit, this line advances in longitude. The value of the selenographic colongitude increases from 0° to 359° in the direction of the advancing terminator, at a rate of 0.5° per hour, or 12° per day.

Sunrise occurs at the prime meridian when the Lunar phase reaches First Quarter, after one fourth of a lunar day. At this location the selenographic colongitude at sunrise is defined as 0°. Thus, by the time of the Full Moon the colongitude increases to 90°; at Last Quarter it is 180°, and at the New Moon the colongitude reaches 270°. Note that the Moon is nearly invisible from the Earth at New Moon phase except during a solar eclipse.

The low angle of incidence of arriving sunlight tends to pick out features by the sharp shadows they cast, thus the area near the terminator is usually the most favorable for viewing or photographing lunar features through a telescope. The observer will need to know the location of the terminator to plan observations of selected features. The selenographic colongitude is useful for this purpose.

The selenographic longitude of the evening terminator is equal to the colongitude plus 180°.

== See also ==
- Planetary coordinate system
- Selenoid
