= Dorsum Thera =

Wrinkle ridge on the Moon

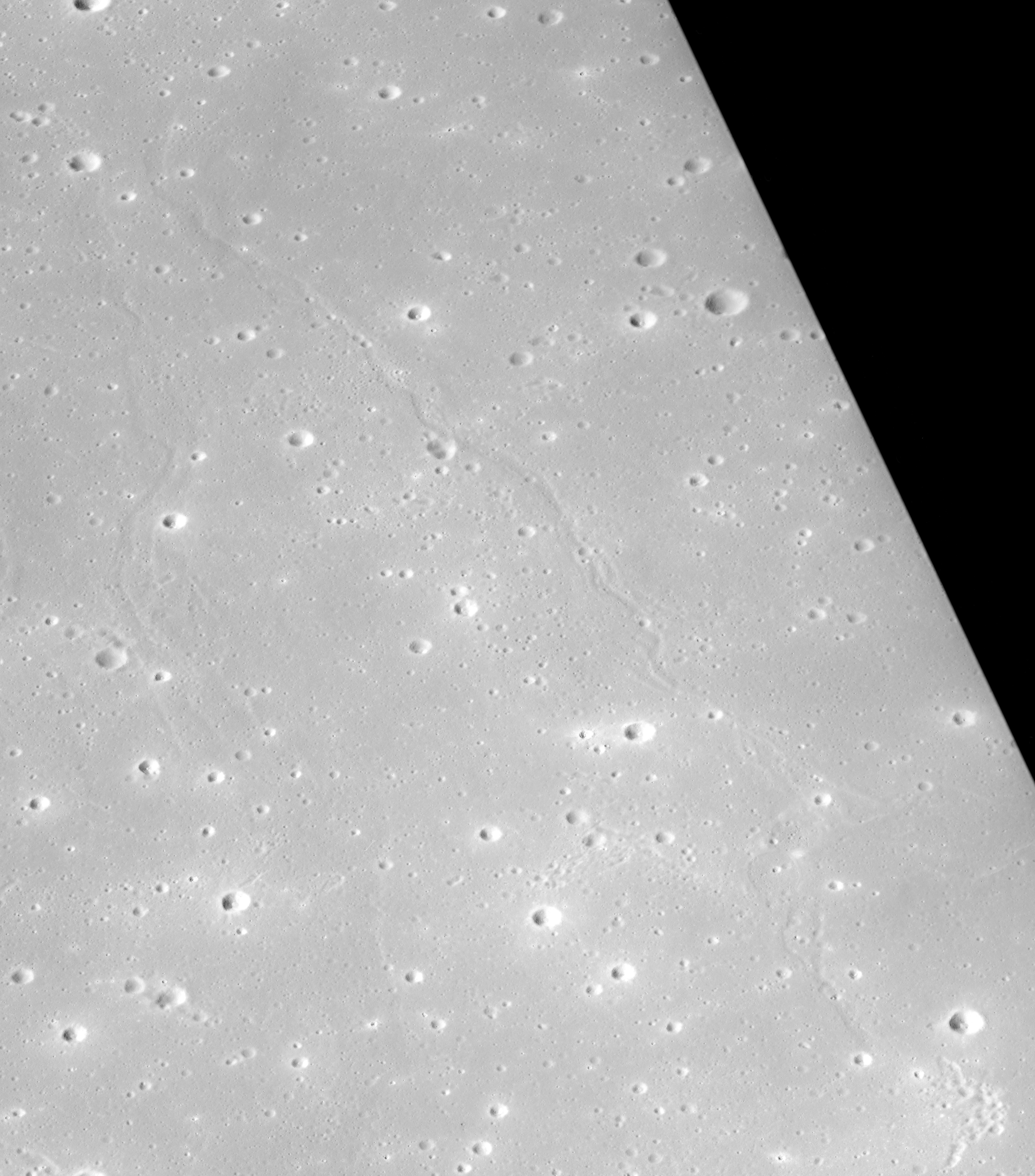
Dorsum Thera from Apollo 15 panoramic camera

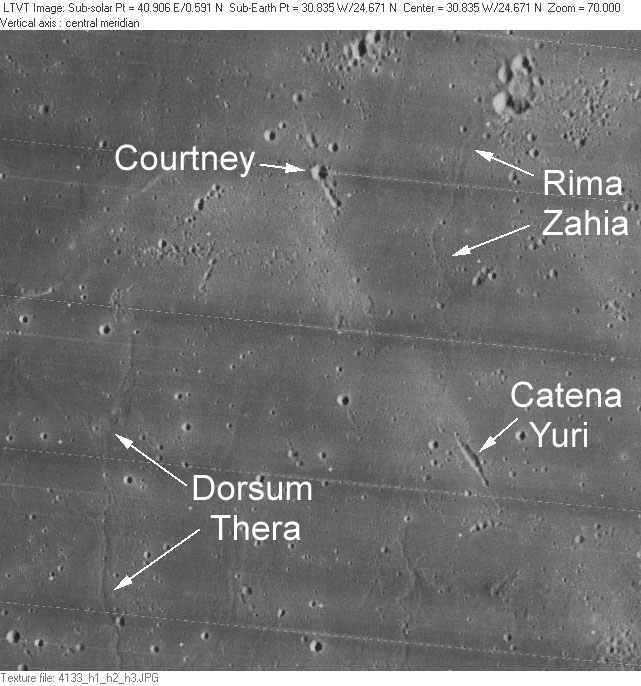
Dorsum Thera is on the bottom left of the Lunar Orbiter 4 photo featuring other features in the area

Dorsum Thera is a wrinkle ridge at 24.4°N 31.4°W in Mare Imbrium on the Moon. It is approximately 7 km long.

NASA proposed the dorsum to be named in honour of Anthony Kontaratos' contribution to the space program (notably rescue of Apollo 13 mission). Nevertheless, Dr. Kontaratos asked for the dorsum to be named 'Thera', after his place of origin (Thera - also known as Santorini, Greece). It was named in 1976.

To the northeast are Courtney crater and Catena Yuri. To the southwest is Mons Vinogradov. The nearest prominent crater is Euler located to the south-southeast.
