= Rima Zahia =

Sinous rille on the Moon

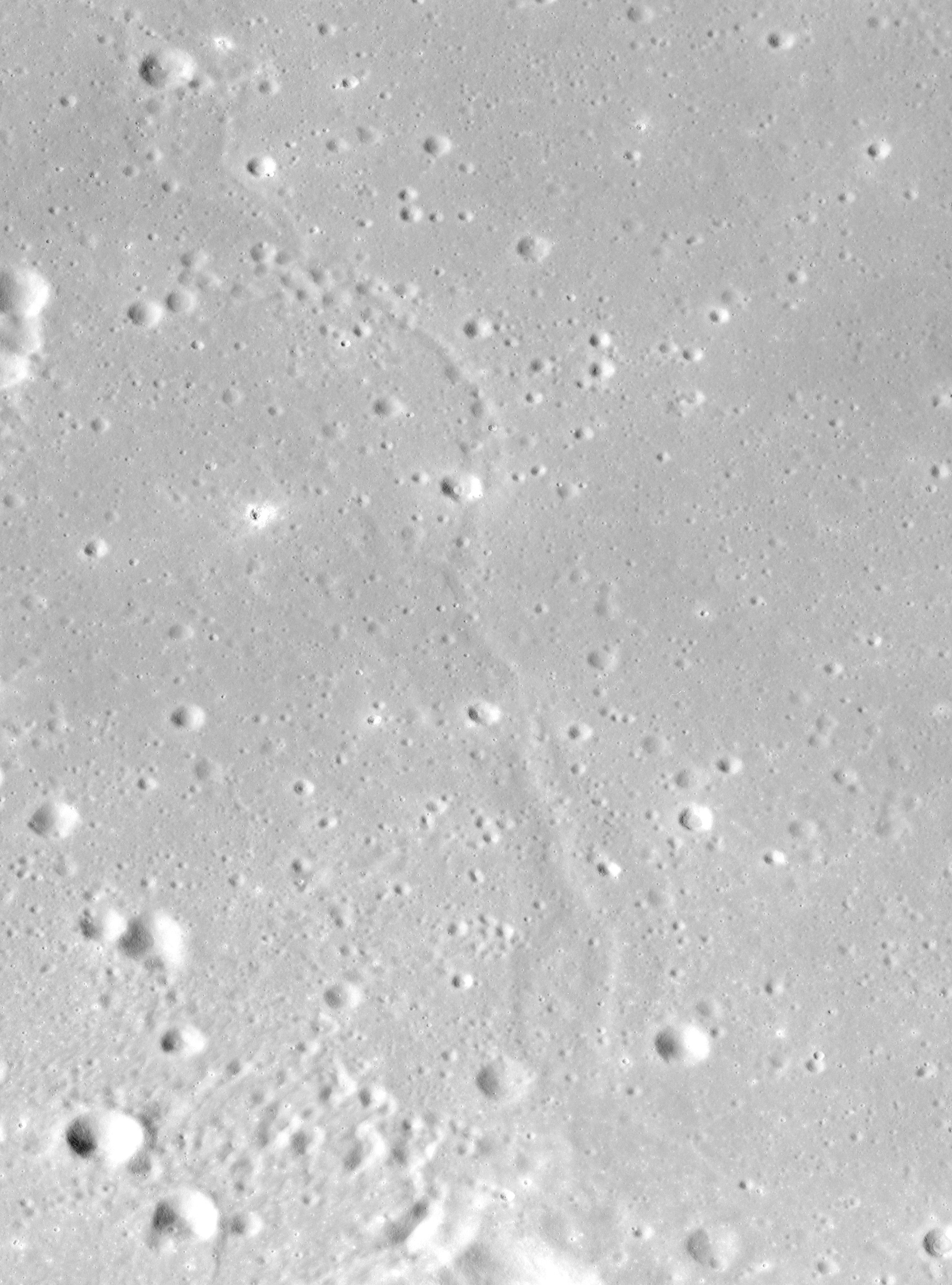
Rima Zahia from Apollo 15 panoramic camera

Rima Zahia is a sinuous rille on the Moon at 25.02°N 30.46°W, in Mare Imbrium. It is approximately 15 km in length.

The name was adopted by the IAU in 1976. Zahia is an Arabic female name, and the rille is not named after a particular person.

Rima Zahia lies to the north of Catena Yuri and east of Courtney crater.

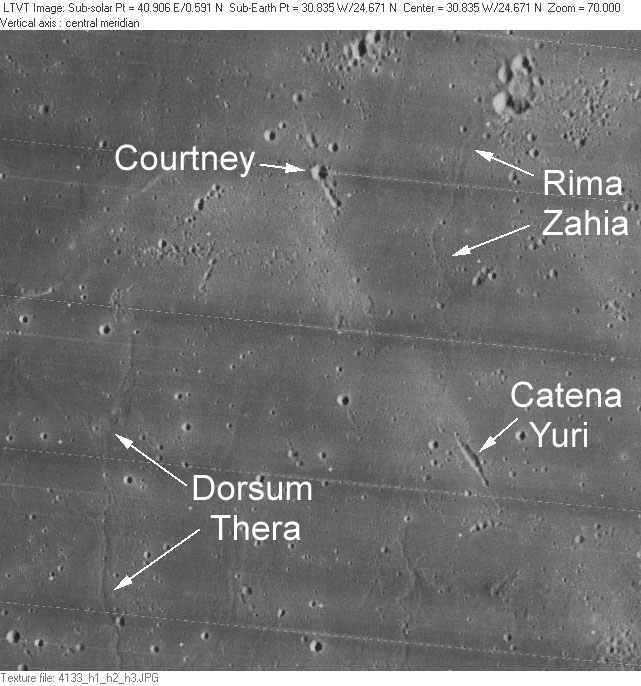
Lunar Orbiter 4 image showing Rima Zahia and other features in the area
