= Catena Yuri =

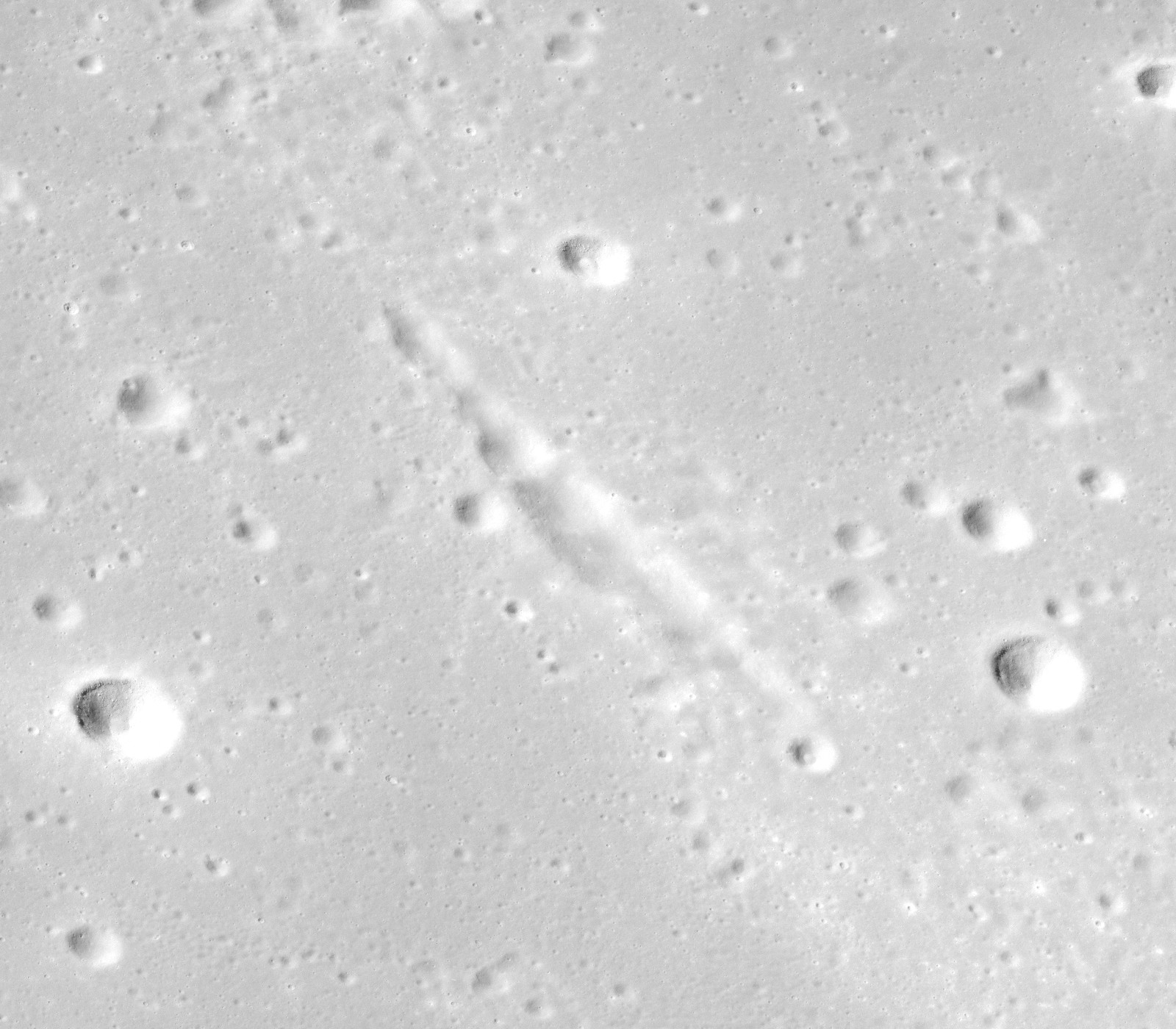
Oblique view from Apollo 15

Catena Yuri is an elongate depression in Mare Imbrium on the moon. The feature's name was approved by the IAU in 1976.

Catena Yuri lies to the south of Rima Zahia and east of Dorsum Thera.

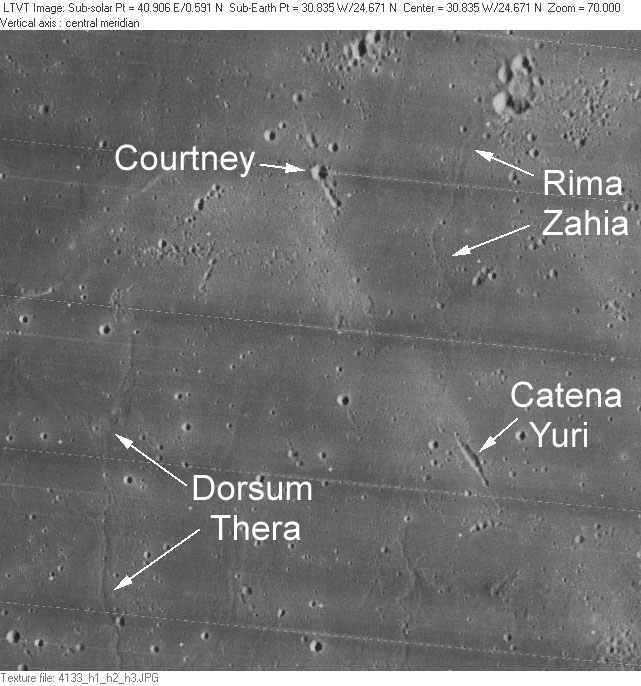
Lunar Orbiter 4 image showing Catena Yuri and other features in the area
