= Alexander Vinogradov (geochemist) =

Soviet geochemist (1895–1975)

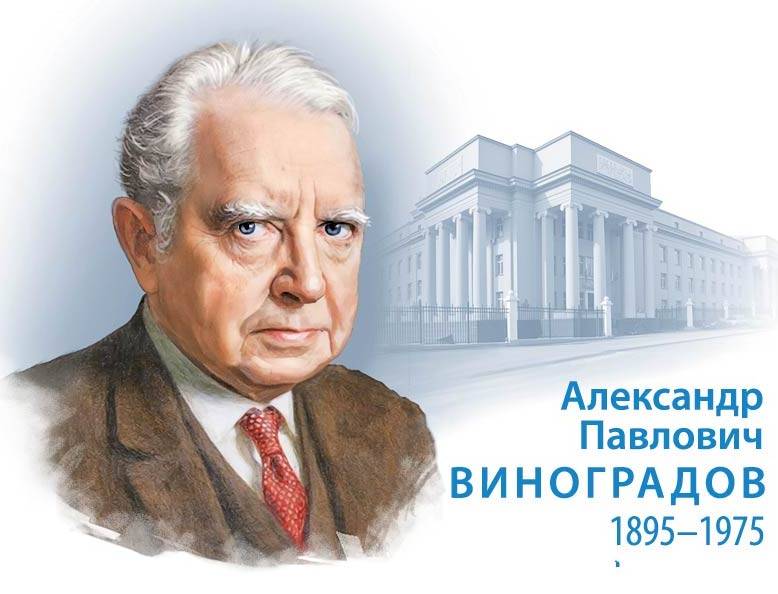
- Vinogradov on a 2025 postcard of Russia
- Born: 6 February 1861; Petretsovo, Romanovo-Borisoglebsky county, Yaroslavl Governorate, Russian Empire
- Died: 16 November 1975 (died at the age of 80); Moscow, USSR
- Education: Military Medical Academy, Leningrad University
- Scientific career
- Fields: Geochemistry
- Workplaces: Vernadsky Institute of Geochemistry and Analytical Chemistry, the Academy of Sciences of the Soviet Union
- Notable students: D. A. Mineev, V. S. Urusov, L. N. Kogarko, I. D. Ryabchikov, А. A. Yaroshevsky, I. G. Mineeva, A. T. Basilevsky

Alexander Pavlovich Vinogradov (Russian: Алекса́ндр Па́влович Виногра́дов; 21 August 1895 – 16 November 1975) was a Soviet geochemist, academician (1953), and Hero of Socialist Labour (1949, 1975).

In 1928, he took up a position as assistant professor in the laboratory for biogeochemical problems of the Academy of Sciences of the Soviet Union.

He was the director of Vernadsky Institute of Geochemistry and Analytical Chemistry, Academy of Sciences of the Soviet Union (1947–1975).

Mons Vinogradov, a mountain on the near side of the Moon, is named after him. So is a large crater on Mars.

== Biography ==
Alexander Vinogradov was born in a family of state ("economic") peasants (employees) in Yaroslavl province or, according to other sources, in St. Petersburg.

At the end of agricultural work, the whole Vinogradov family would go to St. Petersburg to earn money, and for the summer they would come home to Petretsovo where parents would engage in farming. At the end of the 1890s, family moved to St. Petersburg for permanent residence.

In 1907 Alexander Vinogradov graduated from the First Spassky City Primary College in St. Petersburg with honors. He received secondary education by 1916 at the Military District in Petrograd.

Since 1919 Alexander Vinogradov has been studying at the Military Medical Academy and, at the same time, at the Chemistry department of the Physics and Mathematics Faculty of Leningrad State University. In 1924 he graduated from the academy and in 1925 – from the university. Since 1924 he worked at Zelinsky's Moscow laboratory. In 1925 he became a full-time employee at the Physiological Chemistry Department of the Military Medical Academy. From 1926 Alexander Vinogradov worked as a researcher at the Academy of Sciences of the Soviet Union (in the Commission for the Study of Natural Productive Forces) where he thereafter stayed for further scientific work as a senior specialist and deputy director thanks to the invitation of academician Vernadsky in 1930. Alexander Vinogradov participated in the establishment of the Biogeochemical Laboratory of the Academy.

In 1934 Alexander Vinogradov moved to Moscow. In 1935 he was awarded the degree of Doctor of Chemical Sciences for the study of the elemental chemical composition of marine organisms. In 1936 he went on a trip abroad for scientific purposes.

In 1938 he worked as Deputy Director of the Biogeochemical Laboratory of the Academy of Sciences of the Soviet Union.

On 30 September 1943, he was elected a corresponding member of the Academy of Sciences of the Soviet Union in the Department of Chemical Sciences.

In 1945–1947 he worked as the director of the Vernadsky Laboratory of Geochemical Problems of the Academy of Sciences of the Soviet Union. In 1947 he created and headed the Institute of Geochemistry and Analytical Chemistry.

Alexander Vinogradov was one of the leading figures in Soviet atomic project. In 1941 he advised I. V. Kurchatov to start using the thermodiffusion method of isotope separation. At the end of the 1940s, as a leading USSR specialist in the field of analytical chemistry who earned the Lenin Prize in 1934, he was involved in the creation of atomic weapons and the nuclear industry in the Soviet Union. He headed the work on analytical support for the production of nuclear materials of high purity. Under his leadership highly sensitive methods of chemical and analytical research were developed.

On 29 August 1949, at the Semipalatinsk landfill (Kazakhstan) the first Soviet atomic bomb RDS-1 was tested. On 29 October 1949 Alexander Vinogradov was awarded the Hero of Socialist Labor title with the Order of Lenin and the Hammer and Sickle gold medal "for exceptional services to the state while performing a special task" by the Decree of the Presidium of the Supreme Soviet "On conferring the title of Hero of Socialist Labor to scientific, engineering, technical and managerial workers of research organizations, construction companies and industrial enterprises" (classified as "Not to be published"). In the same year he was awarded the Stalin Prize of the 1st degree (he received the Stalin Prize for the second time in 1951).

In 1953 he founded and headed the first Geochemistry Department in the USSR at the Geological Faculty of Moscow State University.

On 23 October 1953, he was elected academician of the Academy of Sciences of the Soviet Union in the Department of Geological and Geographical Sciences (geochemistry, analytical chemistry).

Since 1954 Vinogradov lived on Maxim Gorky Embankment, house No. 4/22.

Vinogradov's research extends from biogeochemistry to cosmochemistry. He studied changes in the chemical composition of organisms in connection with their evolution, especially the contents of rare and trace elements (microelements) in organisms; he introduced the concept of biogeochemical provinces and described the biogeochemical endemicities of plants and animals that are associated with them. He also developed a biogeochemical method for searching for minerals.

Based on isotope studies he showed that photosynthetic oxygen is formed from water, not carbon dioxide. He developed the idea of the physical and chemical theory of geological processes in the field of geochemistry. He studied the geochemistry of a number of elements – in particular, the rare elements in soils and the composition of rocks of the Eastern European (Russian) platform. He also determined the average composition of the main rocks of the Earth. Vinogradov proposed a hypothesis of a universal mechanism for the formation of planetary shells based on the silicate phase zone melting and developed the idea of the Earth chemical evolution.

Vinogradov was editor-in-chief of the Atlas of Lithological-palaeogeographical maps of the Russian Platform (1960–61), the 4-volume Atlas of Lithological-Palaeogeographical Maps of the USSR (1967–68) and a series of books on analytical chemistry of certain elements.

Alexander Vinogradov created a new field in Soviet science, namely geochemistry of isotopes – fractionation of isotopes of light elements (oxygen, sulfur, carbon, potassium and lead) in natural processes. He also made an invaluable contribution to the study of ocean geochemistry. Together with his colleagues, he determined the absolute age of the Earth, the Baltic, Ukrainian, Aldan and other shields, as well as the rocks of India, Africa and other regions. The composition of meteorites (various forms of carbon, gases, etc.) has been studied by the academician.

In 1963–1967 Alexander Vinogradov was the academician and secretary of the Department of Earth Sciences of the Academy of Sciences of the Soviet Union and both Vice President of the Academy since 17 May 1967.

The academician made instrumental determinations of the chemical composition of planetary bodies. He used the data obtained with the help of interplanetary space stations and was the first to establish the presence of basaltic rocks on the surface of the Moon (Luna-10, 1966). He was also the first to determine the chemical composition of the atmosphere of Venus (Venera-4, 1967) by direct measurements.

Academician Vinogradov led the study of lunar soil samples delivered in 1970 to the territory of the USSR from the flat surface of Mare Fecunditatis by the re-entry vehicle of the Soviet automatic interplanetary station Luna-16, as well as soil from Mare Tranquillitatis delivered by the Apollo-11 spacecraft and the samples from the mainland part of the Moon delivered by the Luna-20 station in 1972.

For outstanding services in the organization of Soviet science (and in connection with the 80th anniversary of his birth), Vice-President of the Academy of Sciences of the Soviet Union Alexander Vinogradov was awarded the second Hammer and Sickle gold medal with the Order of Lenin (Decree of the Presidium of the Supreme Soviet dated 20 August 1975).

Since 1958 Vinogradov was a member of the international Pugwash Conference of Scientists and World Affairs. He was elected member of a number of foreign academies of sciences. He is an honorary member of the American and French Geological Societies, Honorary President of the International Association of Geochemistry and Cosmochemistry. He was also Deputy of the Supreme Soviet of the RSFSR of the 3rd convocation.

Vinogradov was one of the academicians of the USSR Academy of Sciences who signed a scientists’ letter to Pravda newspaper condemning “the behavior of Academician Andrey Sakharov” in 1973. The letter accused Sakharov of “having made a number of statements discrediting the political system, foreign and domestic policies of the Soviet Union.” Academicians assessed his human rights activities as the ones “discrediting the honor and dignity of a Soviet scientist.”

Alexander Vinogradov died on 16 November 1975. He was buried in Moscow at the Novodevichy cemetery.

== Awards and prizes ==
- Twice Hero of Socialist Labor (29 October 1949; 20 August 1975)
- 6 Orders of Lenin (29 October 1949; 19 September 1953; 1 April 1954; 23 August 1965; 11 September 1970; 20 August 1975)
- 2 Orders of the Red Banner of Labor (06/10/1945; 30 September 1946)
- medals
- V. I. Lenin Prize (1934)
- Lenin Prize (1962)
- Stalin Prize, 1st degree (1949)
- Stalin Prize, 1st degree (1951) – for the scientific work named “Geochemistry of rare and trace elements in soil” («Геохимия редких и рассеянных элементов в почве») (1950)
- Stalin Prize (1951)
- Lomonosov gold medal of the Academy of Sciences of the Soviet Union (1973)
- Vernadsky gold medal of the Academy of Sciences of the Soviet Union (1965)

== Membership in scientific societies ==
- Corresponding member of the Academy of Sciences of the Soviet Union (1943), member (academician) of the Academy of Sciences of the Soviet Union (1953).
- Foreign member of the Bulgarian Academy of Sciences, Polish Academy of Sciences, Indian National Academy of Sciences.

== Memory ==
A bronze bust of Vinogradov, twice Hero of Socialist Labor (sculptor – Z.M. Vilensky, architect – V.S. Maslov), was opened on 17 January 1978 on the Alley of Heroes of Moscow Victory Park in Leningrad.

Memorial plaques are installed on the building of the Military Medical Academy in St. Petersburg and on the facade of GEOKHI (Vernadsky Institute of Geochemistry and Analytical Chemistry; Kosygina Street, house No. 19) in Moscow.

The memorial office-museum of Academician Vinogradov was opened at the Vernadsky Institute of Geochemistry and Analytical Chemistry (Moscow).

The name of the scientist was assigned to the Institute of Geochemistry of the Siberian Branch of the Russian Academy of Sciences in Irkutsk.

One of the research vessels of the B-86 project was named Akademik Alexander Vinogradov.

The Vinogradov Prize of the Russian Academy of Sciences was established (1978).

Since 1983 Vinogradov Scientific Readings have been held at the Geological Faculty of Lomonosov Moscow State University.

Two annual Vinogradov scholarships for students of the Geological Faculty of Moscow State University have been established in 1988.

The following were named in honor of Vinogradov:

- vinogradovit mineral,
- Vinogradov Fracture Zone at the bottom of the Atlantic Ocean (60°45′—60°59′ S, 29°33′—28°57′ W),
- Mount Vinogradov (Mons Vinogradov) on the Moon,
- Vinogradov crater with a diameter of 210 km on Mars.
