= Courtney (crater) =

Crater on the Moon

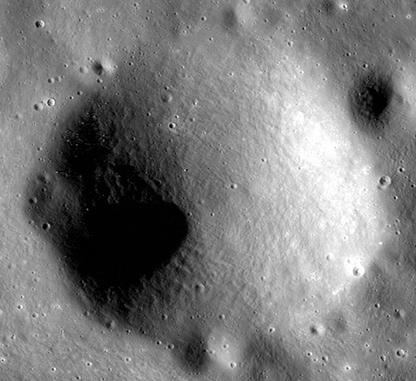
- LRO image
- Coordinates: 25.1°N 30.8°W
- Diameter: 1.24 km (0.77 mi)
- Colongitude: 31° at sunrise
- Eponym: English given name

Courtney is a tiny lunar impact crater on the Mare Imbrium, a lunar mare in the northwest quadrant of the Moon. It lies about two crater diameters to the northwest of Euler, in an otherwise isolated stretch of the mare. The dark surface in this region is marked by Euler's ray material. The name is an English male name. Its designation was formally adopted by the International Astronomical Union in 1976.

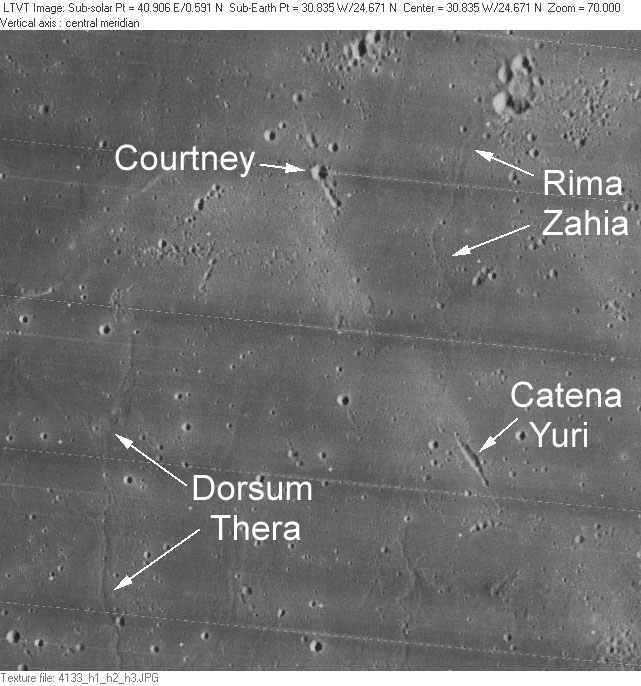
Courtney Crater is on the top left of the Lunar Orbiter 4 image depicting other features in the area
