= Mons Vinogradov =

Mountain on the Moon

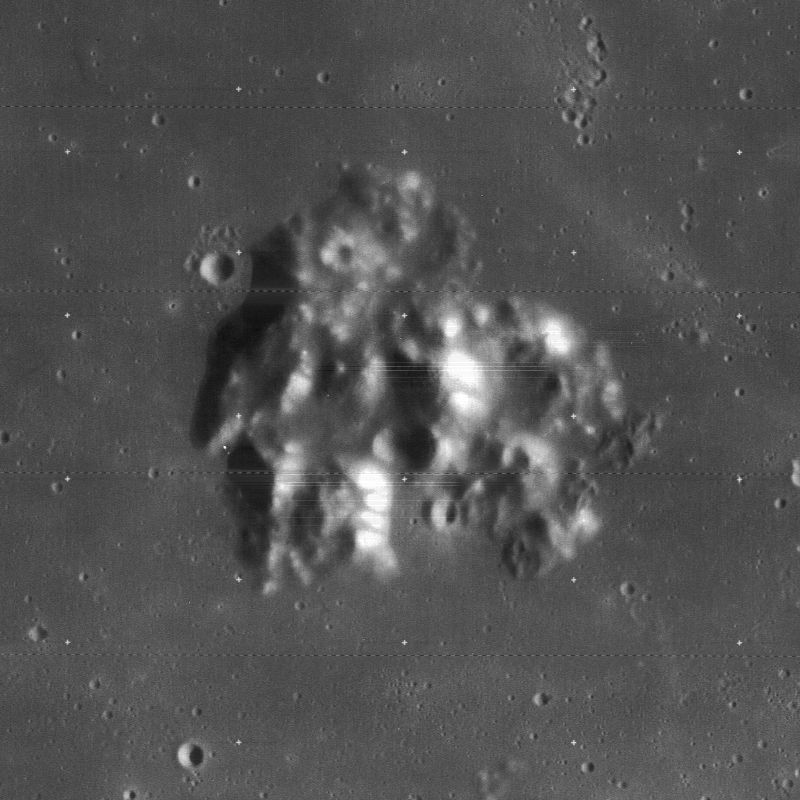
- Lunar Orbiter 4 image

Highest point
- Elevation: 1.4 km
- Listing: Lunar mountains
- Coordinates: 22.4°N 32.4°W

Naming
- Etymology: Aleksandr P. Vinogradov

Geography
- Location: the Moon

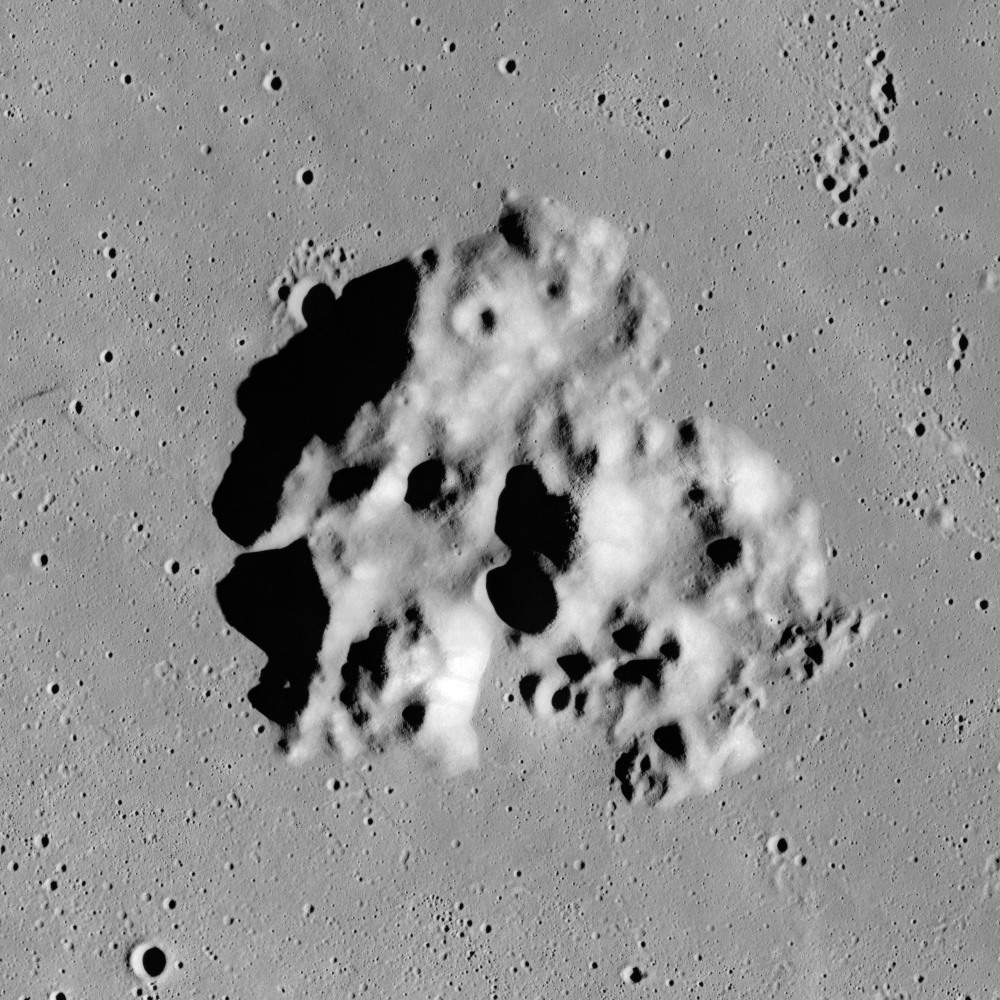
Mons Vinogradov from Apollo 17

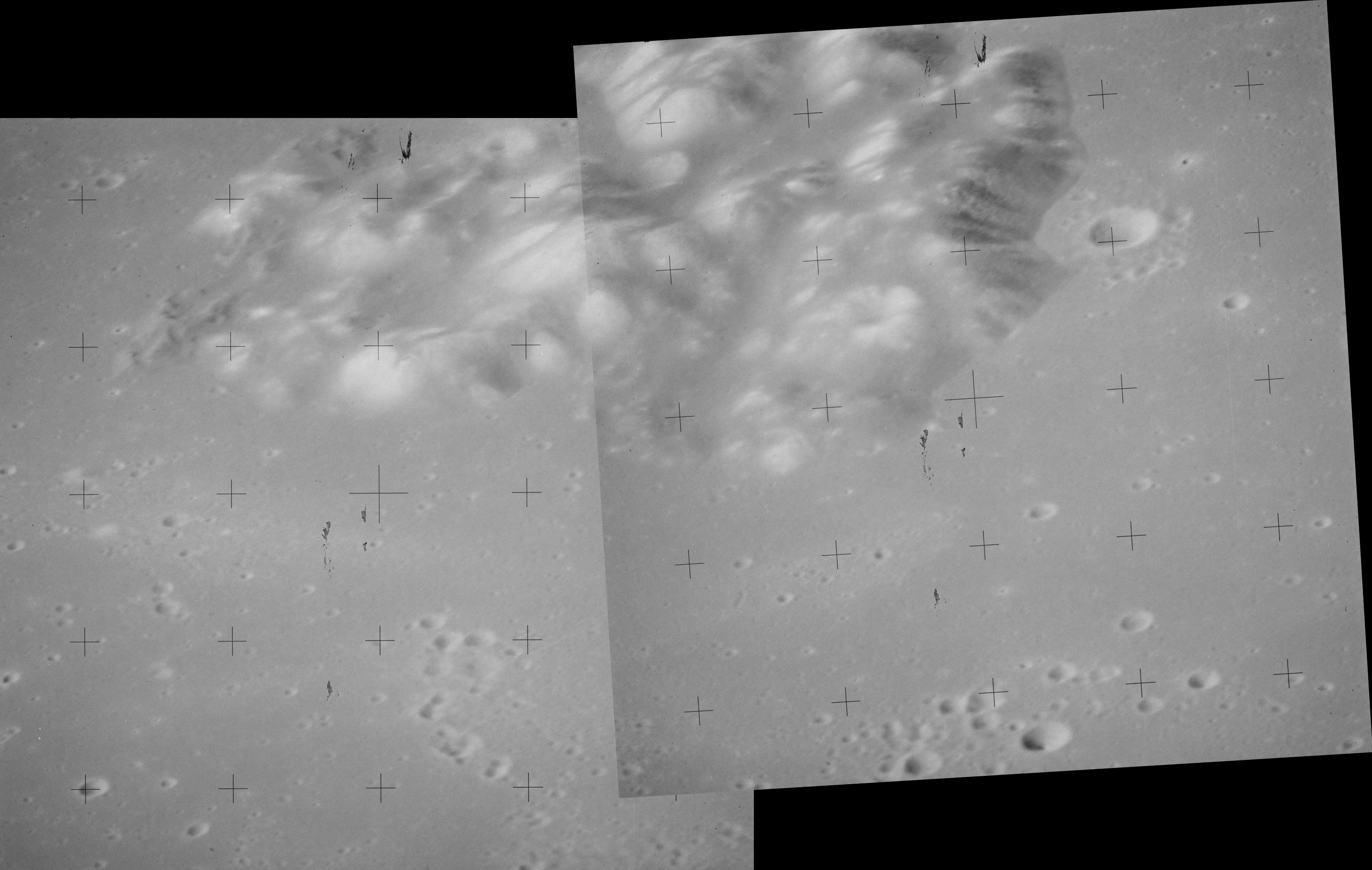
Mosaic from Apollo 15

Mons Vinogradov is a rugged massif that is located on the lunar mare where Oceanus Procellarum to the southwest joins Mare Imbrium to the east. There are three primary peaks in this formation, which rise to altitudes of 1.0–1.4 km above the surface (3,281-4593 ft). To the east of this rise is the crater Euler, and to the southeast is an area of rugged ground that reaches the Montes Carpatus range. The Carpatus mountain range forms the southwest boundary of the Mare Imbrium.

The selenographic coordinates of Mons Vinogradov are 22.4 N, 32.4 W, and it has a maximum diameter of 25 km at the base. It was named after Soviet geochemist Aleksandr P. Vinogradov. This mountain was formerly named Euler Beta (β), or Mons Euler.

In the rugged ground just to the southeast of this mountain is a set of craters that have been assigned names by the IAU. These are listed in the table below.

Crater	Coordinates	Diameter	Name source
Akis	20.0°N 31.8°W	2 km	Greek feminine
Ango	20.5°N 32.3°W	1 km	African masculine
Jehan (Note: Previously designated Euler K.)	20.7°N 31.9°W	5 km	Persian masculine
Natasha (Note: Previously designated Euler P.)	20.0°N 31.3°W	12 km	Russian feminine
Rosa	20.3°N 32.3°W	1 km	Spanish feminine

== Rand McNally's Lothrop Hills ==
Mons Vinogradov is a member of the Lothrop Hills. This name is seen on the greenish colored moonmap from Rand McNally, and also on the moonmap in Patrick Moore's Atlas of the Universe (1983). The name Lothrop Hills was not accepted by the International Astronomical Union (IAU). This cluster of hills and hillocks, southwest of crater Euler, is called The Euler Group in Harold Hill's A Portfolio of Lunar Drawings (1991).

== See also ==
- List of mountains on the Moon
