= Euler (crater) =

Crater on the Moon

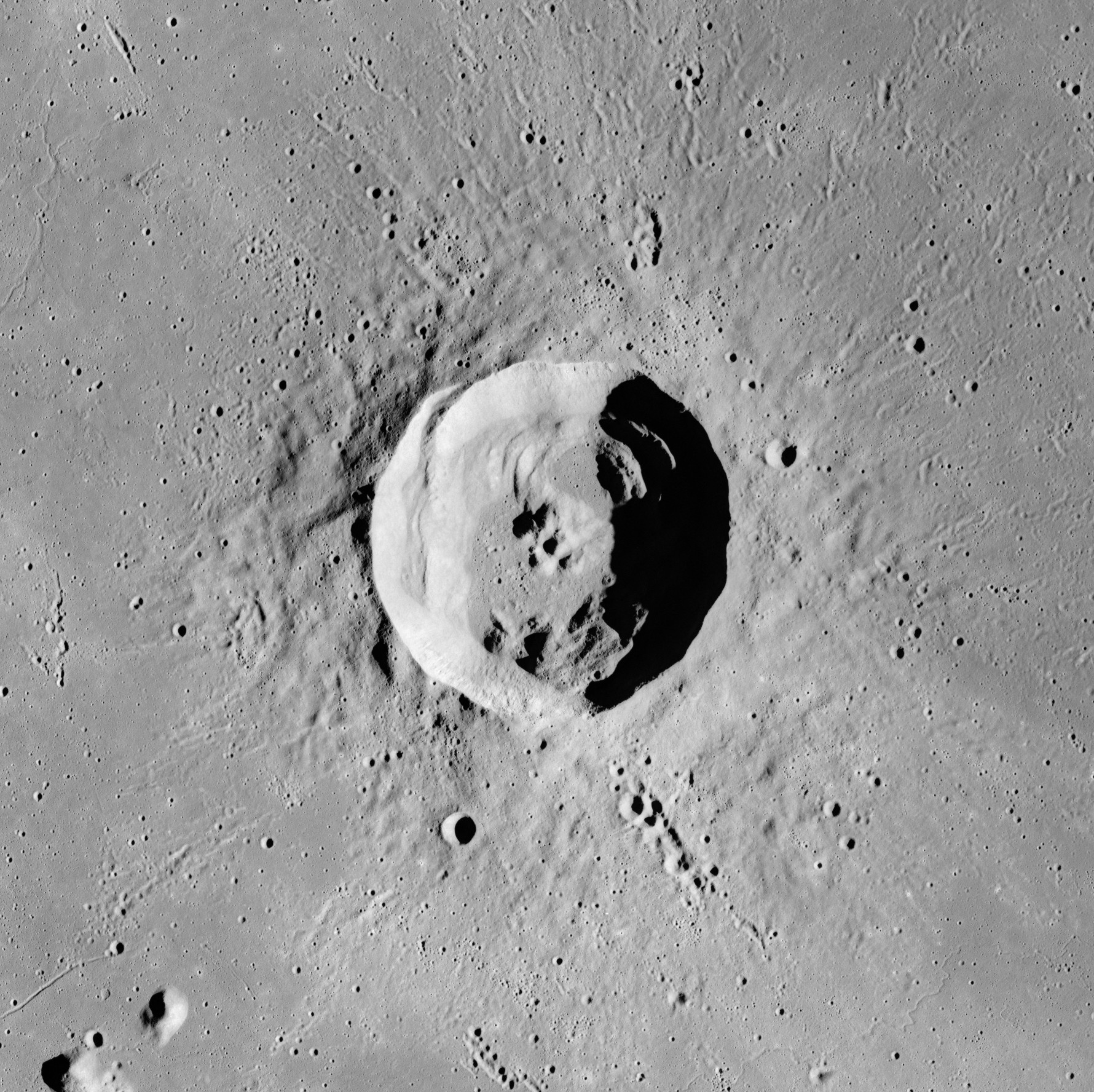
- From Apollo 17
- Coordinates: 23.3°N 29.2°W
- Diameter: 26.03 km (16.17 mi)
- Depth: 2.2 km (1.4 mi)
- Colongitude: 28° at sunrise
- Formation: Eratosthenian or Copernican
- Eponym: Leonhard Euler

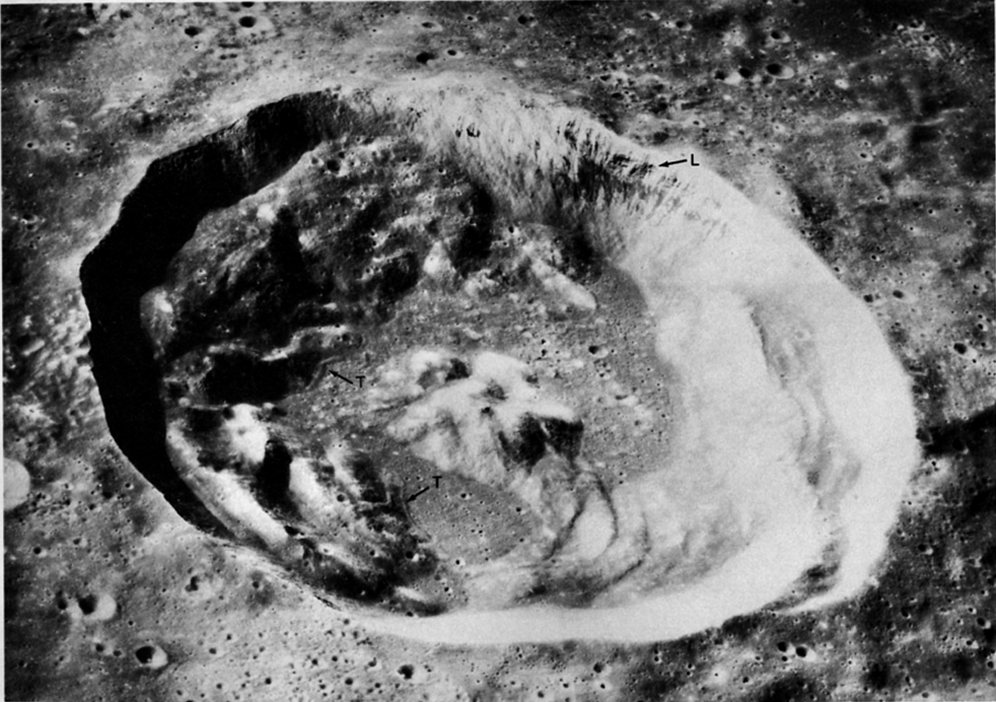
Oblique view also from Apollo 17, facing south

Euler is a lunar impact crater located in the southern half of the Mare Imbrium. The most notable nearby feature is Mons Vinogradov to the west-southwest, which was formerly named Mons Euler. There is a cluster of low ridges to the southwest, and this formation includes the small crater Natasha and the tiny Jehan. To the southwest is the 105-km diameter Rima Euler, which is named after the crater. About 200 kilometers to the east-northeast is the comparably sized crater Lambert.

On the lunar geologic timescale, Euler dates from the Eratosthenian or Copernican period. Euler's rim is surrounded by a low rampart, and contains some slight terracing and slumped features on the irregular inner wall surface. In the middle of the small interior floor is a low central peak. The crater has a minor system of rays that make it easy to find under full illumination. Some of the larger crater chains near Euler are probably associated with Copernicus crater.

This formation is named after the Swiss mathematician, physicist and astronomer Leonhard Euler (1707-1783). His name was incorporated into lunar nomenclature by German astronomer Johann H. Schröter in 1791. Its designation was formally adopted by the International Astronomical Union in 1935.

== Rand McNally's Lothrop Hills ==
The cluster of hills and hillocks with Mons Vinogradov, southwest of Euler, is called Lothrop Hills on the greenish colored moonmap from Rand McNally. The name Lothrop Hills is also seen on the moonmap in Patrick Moore's Atlas of the Universe (1983). This name was not accepted by the International Astronomical Union (IAU). Harold Hill called this cluster The Euler Group in his A Portfolio of Lunar Drawings (1991).

== Half-submerged crater at Euler gamma ==
Euler gamma, an oblong boot-shaped hill south-southeast of Euler, shows a half-submerged bowl-shaped crater at the base of its southeastern slope. This appearance was noticed by Harold Hill and depicted in his A Portfolio of Lunar Drawings (1991). It was also photographed from orbit during the mission of Apollo 17.

== Satellite craters ==
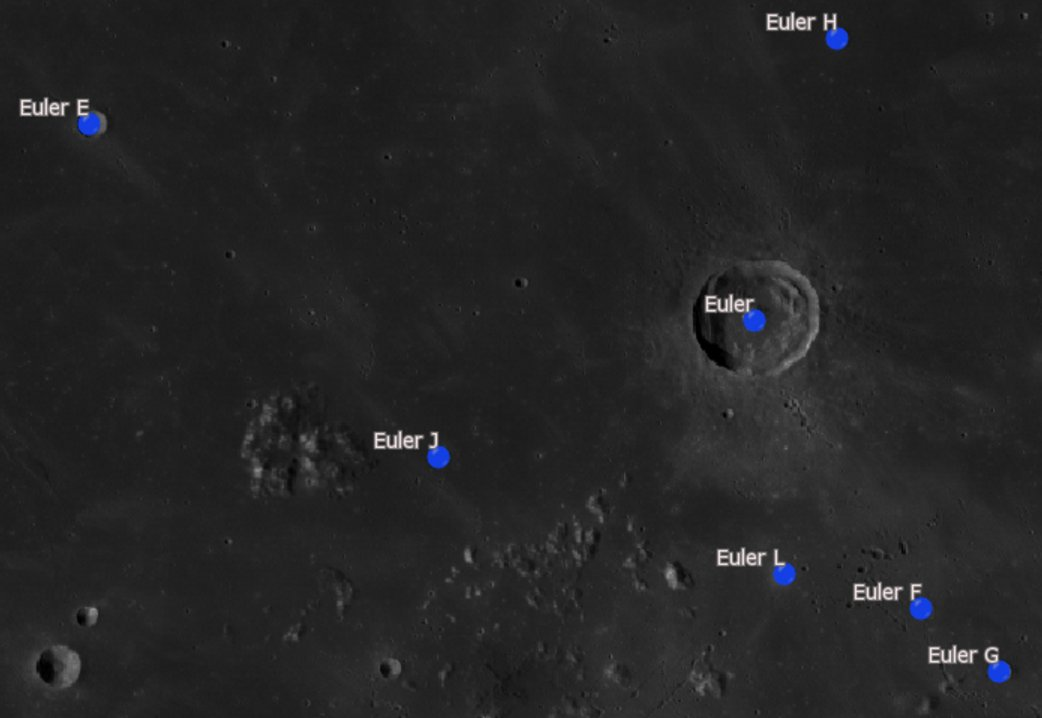
Euler and its satellite craters

By convention these features are identified on lunar maps by placing the letter on the side of the crater midpoint that is closest to Euler.

Euler	Latitude	Longitude	Diameter
E	24.7° N	34.0° W	6 km
F	21.2° N	27.9° W	6 km
G	20.7° N	27.4° W	4 km
H	25.3° N	28.6° W	4 km
J	22.3° N	31.5° W	4 km
L	21.4° N	28.9° W	4 km

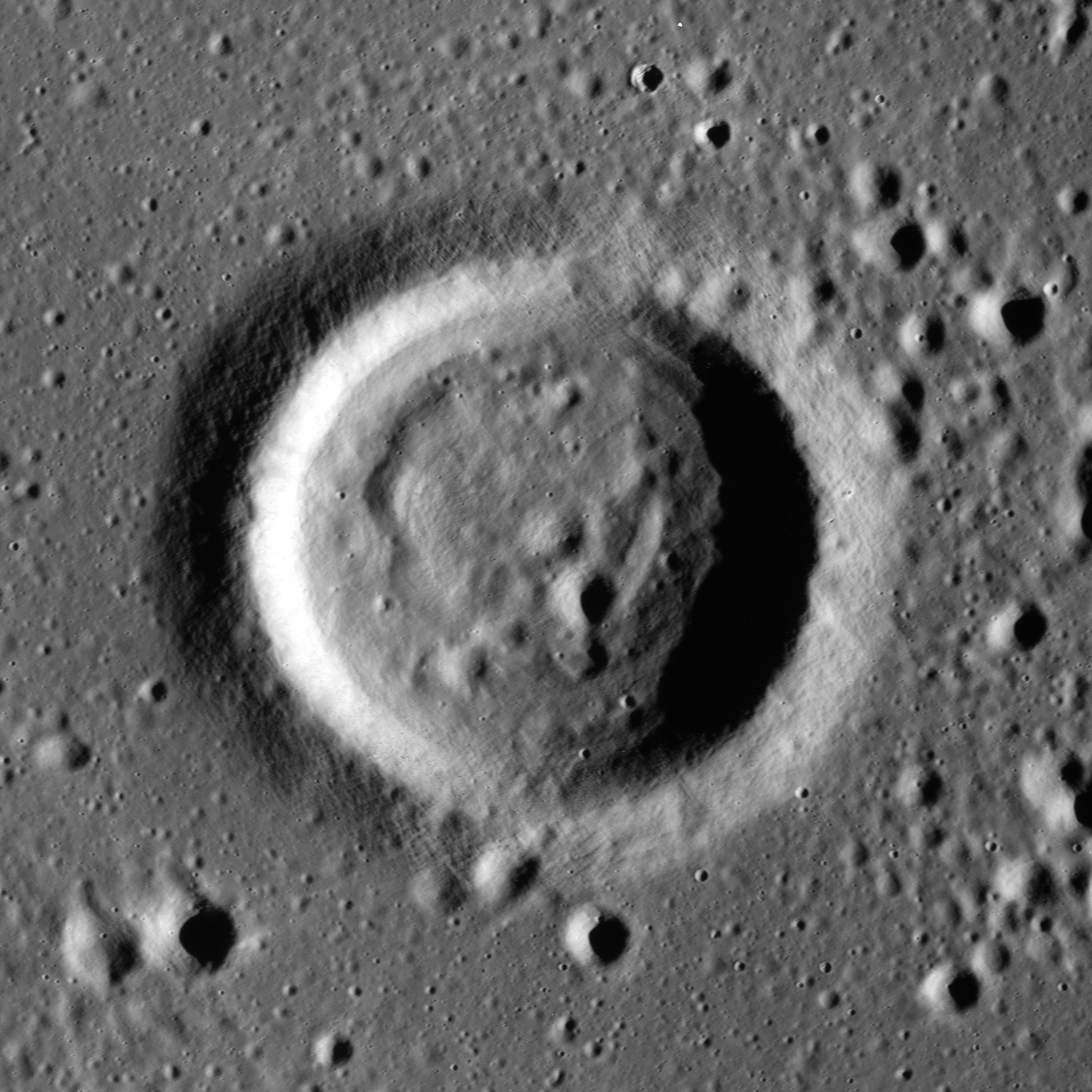
Euler J crater

The following craters have been renamed by the IAU.

- Euler K — See Jehan.
- Euler P — See Natasha.
