= Moon =

Natural satellite orbiting Earth

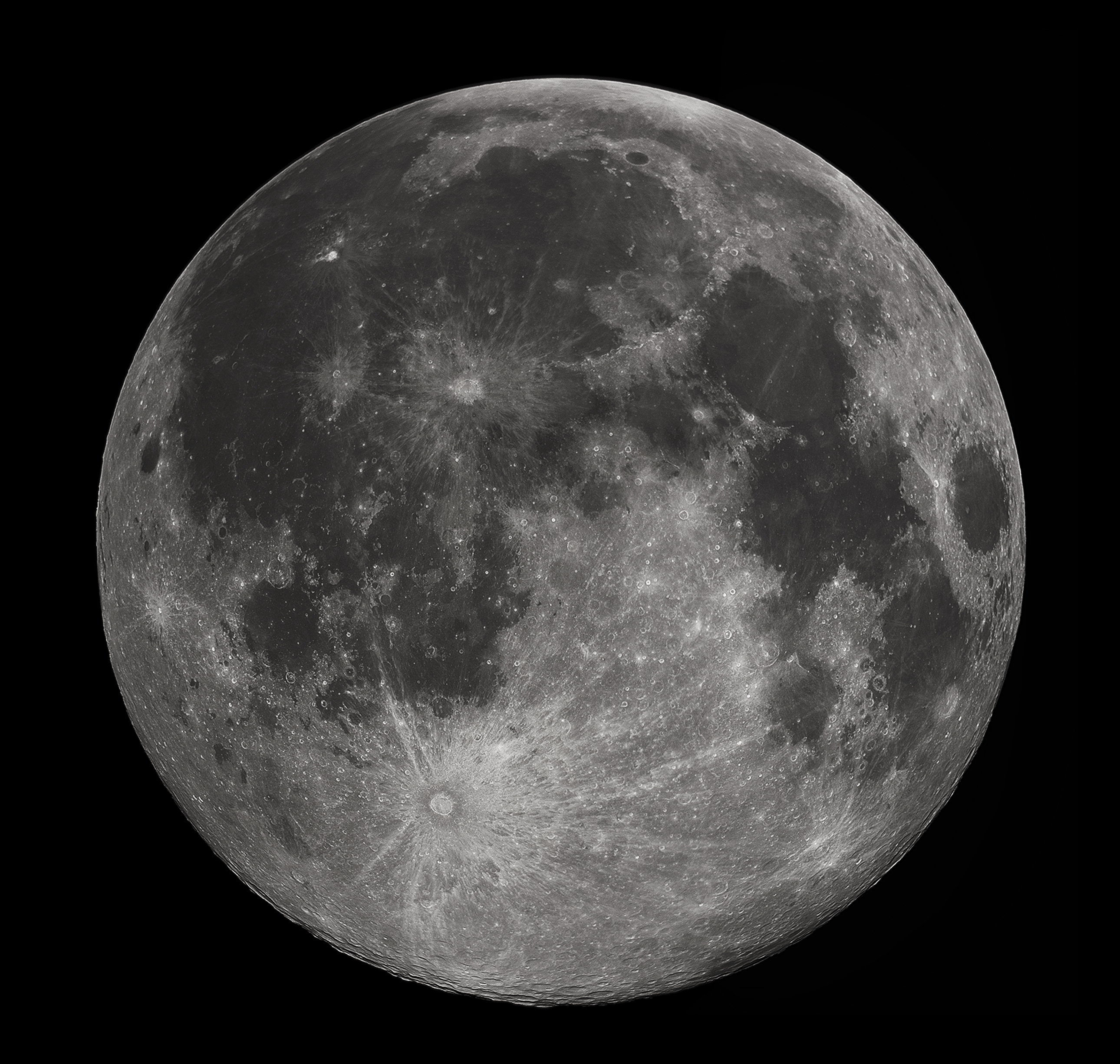
- The near side of the Moon with the lunar north pole at the top

Designations
- Designation: Earth I
- Alternative names: Luna; Selene (poetic); Cynthia (poetic)
- Symbol: or

Orbital characteristics
- Epoch J2000
- Perigee: 362600 km (356400–370400 km)
- Apogee: 405400 km (404000–406700 km)
- Semi-major axis: 384399 km (1.28 ls; 1/389 AU; 1 LD)
- Mean orbit radius: 384784 km (1.28 ls; 1/384 AU; 1.001 LD)
- Eccentricity: 0.0549
- Orbital period (sidereal): 27.321661 d (27 d 7 h 43 min 11.5 s)
- Orbital period (synodic): 29.530589 d (29 d 12 h 44 min 2.9 s)
- Average orbital speed: 1.022 km/s
- Inclination: 5.145° to the ecliptic (Note: Between 18.29° and 28.58° to Earth's equator)
- Longitude of ascending node: Regressing by one revolution in 18.61 years
- Argument of perigee: Progressing by one revolution in 8.85 years
- Satellite of: Earth (Note: There are a number of near-Earth asteroids, including 3753 Cruithne, that are co-orbital with Earth: their orbits bring them close to Earth for periods of time but then alter in the long term (Morais et al, 2002). These are quasi-satellites – they are not moons as they do not orbit Earth. For more information, see Other moons of Earth.)

Physical characteristics
- Mean radius: 1737.4 km (0.2727 of Earth's)
- Equatorial radius: 1738.1 km (0.2725 of Earth's)
- Polar radius: 1736.0 km (0.2731 of Earth's)
- Flattening: 0.0012
- Circumference: 10921 km (equatorial)
- Surface area: 3.793×10^{7} km^{2} (0.074 of Earth's)
- Volume: 2.1958×10^{10} km^{3} (0.02 of Earth's)
- Mass: 7.346×10^{22} kg (0.0123 of Earth's)
- Mean density: 3.344 g/cm^{3} 0.606 × Earth
- Surface gravity: 1.622 m/s^{2} (5.32 ft/s^{2}); 0.1654 g_{0}
- Moment of inertia factor: 0.3929±0.0009
- Escape velocity: 2.38 km/s (8600 km/h; 5300 mph)
- Synodic rotation period: 29.530589 d (29 d 12 h 44 min 2.9 s; synodic; solar day) (spin-orbit locked)
- Sidereal rotation period: 27.321661 d (spin-orbit locked)
- Equatorial rotation velocity: 4.627 m/s
- Axial tilt: 1.5424° to ecliptic; 6.687° to orbit plane; 24° to Earth's equator
- North pole right ascension: 17^{h} 47^{m} 26^{s}; 266.86°
- North pole declination: 65.64°
- Albedo: 0.136
Surface temp.	min	mean	max
Equator	100 K	250 K	390 K
85°N		150 K	230 K
- Surface absorbed dose rate: 13.2 μGy/h (during lunar daytime)
- Surface equivalent dose rate: 57.0 μSv/h (during lunar daytime)
- Apparent magnitude: −2.5 to −12.9 (Note: The maximum value is given based on scaling of the brightness from the value of −12.74 given for an equator to Moon-center distance of 378 000 km in the NASA factsheet reference to the minimum Earth–Moon distance given there, after the latter is corrected for Earth's equatorial radius of 6 378 km, giving 350 600 km. The minimum value (for a distant new moon) is based on a similar scaling using the maximum Earth–Moon distance of 407 000 km (given in the factsheet) and by calculating the brightness of the earthshine onto such a new moon. The brightness of the earthshine is [ Earth albedo × (Earth radius / Radius of Moon's orbit)^{2} ] relative to the direct solar illumination that occurs for a full moon. (Earth albedo = 0.367; Earth radius = (polar radius × equatorial radius)^{½} = 6 367 km.)); −12.74 (mean full moon)
- Absolute magnitude (H): 0.2
- Angular diameter: 29.3 to 34.1 arcminutes (Note: The range of angular size values given are based on simple scaling of the following values given in the fact sheet reference: at an Earth-equator to Moon-center distance of 378 000 km, the angular size is 1896 arcseconds. The same fact sheet gives extreme Earth–Moon distances of 407 000 km and 357 000 km. For the maximum angular size, the minimum distance has to be corrected for Earth's equatorial radius of 6 378 km, giving 350 600 km.)

Atmosphere
- Surface pressure: 10^{−7} Pa (1 picobar) (day); 10^{−10} Pa (1 femtobar) (night) (Note: Lucey et al. (2006) give 10^{7} particles cm^{−3} by day and 10^{5} particles cm^{−3} by night. Along with equatorial surface temperatures of 390 K by day and 100 K by night, the ideal gas law yields the pressures given in the infobox (rounded to the nearest order of magnitude): 10^{−7} Pa by day and 10^{−10} Pa by night.)
- Composition by volume: He; Ar; Ne; Na; K; H

The Moon is the only natural satellite of Earth. It orbits Earth in an elliptical path, at a distance that varies over the year, averaging around 378,000 kilometers (235,000 mi). It completes an orbit (lunar month) in relation to Earth and the Sun (synodically) every 29.5 days. The Moon and Earth are bound by gravitational attraction, which is stronger on the sides facing each other. The resulting tidal forces are the main driver of Earth's tides, and have pulled the Moon to always face Earth with the same near side. This tidal locking effectively synchronizes the Moon's rotation period (lunar day) to its orbital period (lunar month).

In geophysical terms, the Moon is a planetary-mass object or satellite planet. Its mass is 1.2% that of the Earth, and its diameter is 3,474 km (2,159 mi), roughly one-quarter of Earth's (about as wide as the contiguous United States). Within the Solar System, it is larger and more massive than any known dwarf planet, and the fifth-largest and fifth–most massive moon, as well as the largest and most massive in relation to its parent planet. Its surface gravity is about one-sixth of Earth's, about half that of Mars, and the second-highest among all moons in the Solar System after Jupiter's moon Io. The body of the Moon is differentiated and terrestrial, with only a minuscule hydrosphere, atmosphere, and magnetic field. The lunar surface is covered in regolith dust, which mainly consists of the fine material ejected from the lunar crust by impact events. The lunar crust is marked by impact craters; some younger ones feature bright ray-like streaks. The Moon was volcanically active until 1.2 billion years ago, surfacing lava mostly on the thinner near side of the Moon, filling ancient craters, which through cooling formed the today prominently visible dark plains of basalt called maria ('seas'). The Moon is thought to have been formed out of material from Earth that was ejected by a giant impact of a Mars-sized body. Studies based on isotopic dating crystallization of the lunar magma ocean suggested that the Moon formed 4.35 billion years ago, late in the history of the Solar System.

From a distance, the day and night phases of the lunar day are visible as the lunar phases, and when the Moon passes through Earth's shadow a lunar eclipse is observable. The Moon's apparent size in Earth's sky is about the same as that of the Sun, which causes it to cover the Sun completely during a total solar eclipse. The Moon is the brightest celestial object in Earth's night sky because of its large apparent size, while the reflectance (albedo) of its surface is comparable to that of asphalt. About 59% of the surface of the Moon is visible from Earth owing to the different angles at which the Moon can appear in Earth's sky (libration), making parts of the far side of the Moon visible.

The Moon has been an important source of inspiration and knowledge in human history, having been crucial to cosmography, mythology, religion, art, time keeping, natural science and spaceflight. The first spaceflights to an extraterrestrial body were to the Moon, starting in 1959 with the flyby of Luna 1 (sent by the Soviet Union), and the intentional impact of Luna 2, followed in 1966 by the first soft landing (by Luna 9) and orbital insertion (by Luna 10). Humans first arrived in orbit with Apollo 8 (sent by the United States) on December 24, 1968, and then on the surface with Apollo 11 on July 20, 1969, making the Moon the only celestial body beyond Earth that humans have visited. By 1972, six Apollo missions had landed twelve people on the Moon and stayed up to three days. Renewed robotic exploration of the Moon, in particular to confirm the presence of water on the Moon, has fueled plans to return humans to the Moon. Among these are the Artemis program, including the Artemis II crewed lunar flyby of 2026.

== Names and etymology ==
The English proper name for Earth's natural satellite is typically written as Moon, with a capital M. The noun moon is derived from Old English mōna, which stems from *mēnōn, which in turn comes from Proto-Indo-European *mēnsis ('month') – from earlier *mēnōt (genitive *mēneses), which may be related to a verb meaning 'to measure [time]'.

The Latin name for the Moon is lūna. The English adjective lunar was ultimately borrowed from Latin, likely through French. In scientific writing and science fiction, the Moon is sometimes referred to as Luna /ˈluːnə/ to distinguish it from other moons. In poetry, Luna may also refer to the personification of the Moon as a woman.

The Ancient Greek word selḗnē referred to the Moon as a celestial body, and also to the moon goddess Selene /səˈliːniː/. The rare English adjective selenian /səliːniən/ is used to describe the Moon as a world, as opposed to a celestial object. Its cognate selenic, originally a rare synonym, now almost always refers to the chemical element selenium. The corresponding prefix seleno- appears in terms including selenography (the study of the lunar surface).

The astronomical symbols for the Moon are the crescent and decrescent, for example in M_{☾} 'lunar mass'.

=== Classification ===
The International Astronomical Union (IAU) calls Earth's satellite "the Moon", with a capital "M". Other natural satellites of planets are called 'moons', with a lower-case "m". The Moon has historically been identified as a classical planet, in the original sense of a wandering object in the sky. When Galileo discovered satellites orbiting Jupiter, he named them 'moons' because, like the Moon, they can be considered planets orbiting another planet. Some experts hold to a geophysical definition that classifies moons as planets that orbit the Sun while incidentally orbiting another planet.

In a heliocentric frame of reference the Moon orbits the Sun, perturbed by Earth. This has led some scientists to argue that the Moon could be identified as a planet, both historically and qualitatively, adding that its mass would be enough to clear its orbit around the Sun if it were on its own. Some have suggested that this implies that the Earth–Moon system is a double planet. The International Astronomical Union standards organization has no definition for planets in a binary system, or for what constitutes a double planet system, but most scientists agree that this would require the Moon-Earth barycenter to be outside of Earth, which it is not.

== Natural history ==
=== Formation ===
This not-to-scale animation shows (in an Earth and Sun stationary rotating frame of reference) the formation of the Moon through the collision of the hypothetical Mars-sized planet named Theia with Earth. After orbiting for tens of millions of years at the L_{4} Lagrange point as an Earth-trojan, Theia's orbit comes in "loops" finally too close to Earth.

Isotope dating of lunar samples suggests the Moon formed sometime in the first 200 million years after the origin of the Solar System. The most reliable measurements across the major rock types report 4.35 Gyr for the age.

The prevailing theory is that the Earth–Moon system formed after a giant impact of a Mars-sized body (named Theia) with the proto-Earth. The oblique impact blasted material into orbit about the Earth and the material accreted and formed the Moon just beyond the Earth's Roche limit of ~2.56 R_{🜨}.

Giant impacts are thought to have been common in the early Solar System. Computer simulations of giant impacts have produced results that are consistent with the mass of the lunar core and the angular momentum of the Earth–Moon system. These simulations show that most of the Moon derived from the impactor, rather than the proto-Earth. However, models from 2007 and later suggest a larger fraction of the Moon derived from the proto-Earth. Other bodies of the inner Solar System such as Mars and Vesta have, according to meteorites from them, very different oxygen and tungsten isotopic compositions compared to Earth. However, Earth and the Moon have nearly identical isotopic compositions. The isotopic equalization of the Earth–Moon system might be explained by the post-impact mixing of the vaporized material that formed the two, although this is debated.

The impact would have released enough energy to liquefy both the ejecta and the Earth's crust, forming a magma ocean. The liquefied ejecta could have then re-accreted into the Earth–Moon system. The newly formed Moon would have had its own magma ocean; its depth is estimated from about 500 km (300 miles) to 1,737 km (1,079 miles). Two continent sized chunks of Earth's lower mantle have been proposed as remnants of Theia still present inside the Earth.

High-resolution simulations (up to 10^{8} particles) find that giant impacts can immediately place a satellite with similar mass and iron content to the Moon into orbit sufficiently far from Earth to avoid tidal destruction (outside the Roche limit). Even simulated satellites that initially pass within the Roche limit can reliably and predictably survive, by being partially stripped and then torqued onto wider, stable orbits.

While the giant-impact theory explains many lines of evidence, some questions are still unresolved, most of which involve the Moon's composition. Models that have the Moon acquiring a significant amount of the proto-Earth are more difficult to reconcile with geochemical data for the isotopes of zirconium, oxygen, silicon, and other elements.

=== Natural development ===
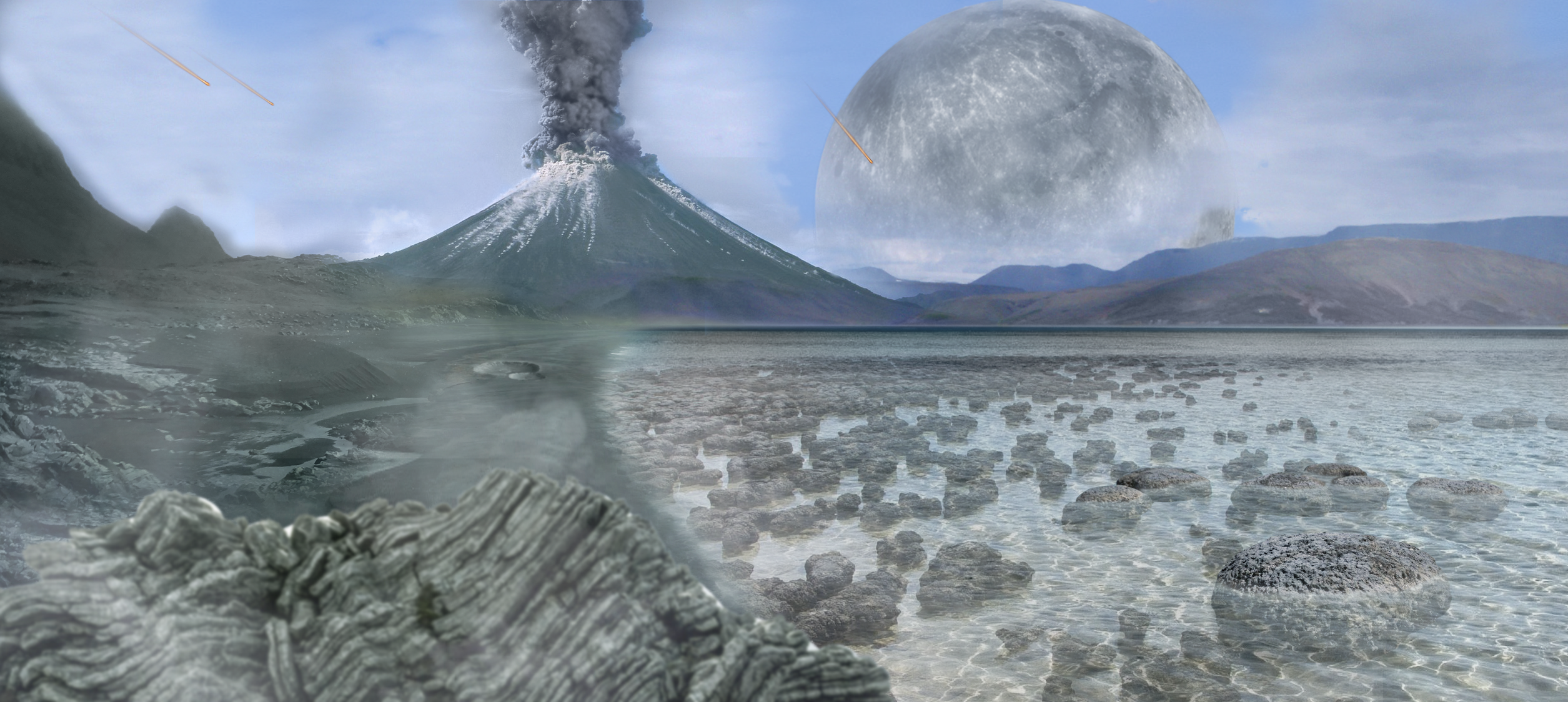
Artist's depiction of the Moon in Earth's sky as it might have appeared around 4 billion years ago, after the Late Heavy Bombardment. At that time the Moon orbited the Earth at a third of its current distance, making it appear 2.8 times larger in apparent size than it does today.

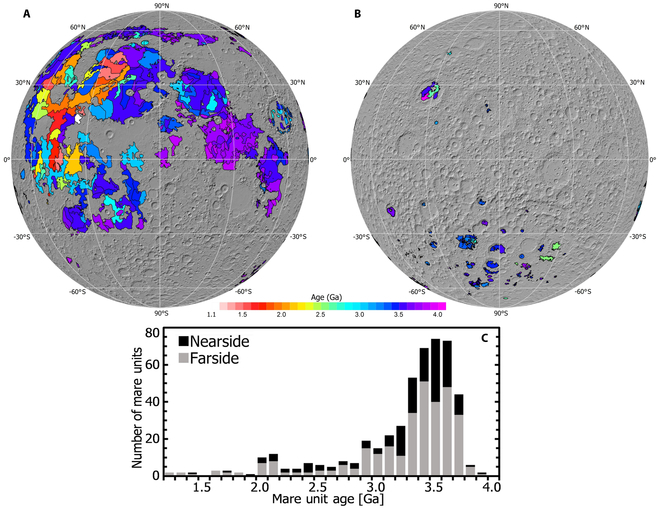
The Moon was volcanically active for billions of years after its formation. Lava flooding the lunar low lying terrane over time formed today's basalt maria, with their ages marked in this map (yellow to red: youngest; blue to purple: oldest).

The newly formed Moon settled into a much closer Earth orbit than it has today. Each body therefore appeared much larger in the sky of the other, eclipses were more frequent, and tidal effects were stronger. Due to tidal acceleration, the Moon's orbit around Earth has become significantly larger, with a longer period.

Following formation, the Moon has cooled and most of its atmosphere has been stripped. The lunar surface has since been shaped by large impact events and many small ones, forming a landscape featuring craters of all ages.

The Moon was volcanically active until 1.2 billion years ago, which laid down the prominent lunar maria. Most of the mare basalts erupted during the Imbrian period, 3.3–3.7 billion years ago, though some are as young as 1.2 billion years and some as old as 4.2 billion years. The distribution of the mare basalts is uneven, with the basalts predominantly appearing on the Moon's near-side hemisphere. The reasons for this are not yet known, although the relative thinness of the crust on the near side of the Moon is hypothesized to be a factor. Causes of the distribution of the lunar highlands on the far side are also not well understood. Topological measurements show the crust on the near side to be thinner than on the far side. One possible explanation for this is that large impacts on the near side may have made it easier for lava to flow onto the surface.

=== Lunar geologic timescale ===
Millions of years before present

The lunar geologic timescale is based on the most prominent impact events, such as multi-ring formations like Nectaris, Imbrium, and Orientale that are between hundreds and thousands of kilometers in diameter and associated with a broad apron of ejecta deposits that form a regional stratigraphic horizon. The lunar geological periods are named after their characteristic features, from most impact craters outside the dark mare, to the mare and later craters, and finally the young, still bright and therefore readily visible craters with ray systems like Copernicus or Tycho. The lack of an atmosphere, weather, and recent geological processes mean that many of these craters are well-preserved. Although only a few multi-ring basins have been definitively dated, they are useful for assigning relative ages. Because impact craters accumulate at a nearly constant rate, counting the number of craters per unit area can be used to estimate the age of the surface. However care needs to be exercised with the crater counting technique due to the potential presence of secondary craters. Ejecta from impacts can create secondary craters that often appear in clusters or chains but can also occur as isolated formations at a considerable distance from the impact. These can resemble primary craters, and may even dominate small crater populations, so their unidentified presence can distort age estimates.

The radiometric ages of impact-melted rocks collected during the Apollo missions cluster between 3.8 and 4.1 billion years old: this has been used to propose a Late Heavy Bombardment period of increased impacts.

High-resolution images from the Lunar Reconnaissance Orbiter in the 2010s show a contemporary crater-production rate significantly higher than was previously estimated. A secondary cratering process caused by distal ejecta is thought to churn the top two centimeters of regolith on a timescale of 81,000 years. This rate is 100 times faster than the rate computed from models based solely on direct micrometeorite impacts.

=== Long term predictions ===
In five billion years the Moon will orbit 40% further away from Earth than it is now. However, about two to three billion years after that, the Sun will have become a red giant. Assuming the Sun envelops the Earth–Moon system, the consequent drag from the Sun's atmosphere may cause the orbital distance between the Earth and the Moon to decay to the point where the Moon comes within the Earth's Roche limit, leading it to disintegrate.

== Physical characteristics ==
=== Size and mass ===
Size comparison of the main moons of the Solar System with Earth to scale. Nineteen moons are large enough to be round, several having subsurface oceans and one, Titan, having a considerable atmosphere.

The Moon is the fifth largest (by size and mass) natural satellite of the Solar System. It is categorizable as a planetary-mass moon, making it a satellite planet under the geophysical definitions of the term. It is smaller than Mercury but considerably larger than the largest dwarf planet of the Solar System, Pluto. The Moon is the second-densest satellite in the Solar System, after Io.

With a mass of 1/81 of Earth's, and a diameter about 3,500 km (more than one-quarter of Earth's), the Moon is the largest natural satellite in the Solar System relative to its primary planet. (Note: There is no strong correlation between the sizes of planets and the sizes of their satellites. Larger planets tend to have more satellites, both large and small, than smaller planets.) (Note: With 27% the diameter and 60% the density of Earth, the Moon has 1.23% of the mass of Earth. The moon Charon is larger relative to its primary Pluto, but Earth and the Moon are different since Pluto is considered a dwarf planet and not a planet, unlike Earth.) The face of the Moon is comparable to the width of mainland Australia, Europe or the contiguous United States. The whole surface area of the Moon is about 38 million square kilometers, comparable to that of the whole Americas.

The discovery of fault scarp cliffs suggest that the Moon has shrunk by about 90 meters (300 ft) within the past billion years. Similar shrinkage features exist on Mercury. Mare Frigoris, a basin near the north pole long assumed to be geologically dead, has cracked and shifted. Since the Moon does not have tectonic plates, its tectonic activity is slow, and cracks develop as it loses heat.

=== Shape ===
The Moon was initially in hydrostatic equilibrium but has since departed from this condition. It is a very slightly scalene ellipsoid due to tidal stretching, with its long axis displaced 30° from facing the Earth, due to gravitational anomalies from impact basins. Its shape is more elongated than current tidal forces can account for. This 'fossil bulge' indicates that the Moon solidified when it orbited at half its current distance to the Earth, and that it is now too cold for its shape to restore hydrostatic equilibrium at its current orbital distance. Today tidal crust deformation is limited to lobate thrust fault scarps formation.

=== Structure ===
Moon's internal structure: solid inner core (iron-metallic), molten outer core, hardened mantle and crust. The crust on the Moon's near side permanently facing Earth is thinner, featuring larger areas flooded by material of the once molten mantle forming today's lunar maria.

The Moon is a differentiated body with a geochemically distinct crust, mantle, and core. It has a solid iron-rich inner core with a radius possibly as small as 240 kilometers (150 mi) and a fluid outer core primarily made of liquid iron with a radius of roughly 300 kilometers (190 mi). Around the core is a partially molten boundary layer with a radius of about 500 kilometers (310 mi). This structure is thought to have developed through the fractional crystallization of a global magma ocean shortly after the Moon's formation 4.5 billion years ago.

Crystallization of this magma ocean would have created a mafic mantle from the precipitation and sinking of the minerals olivine, clinopyroxene, and orthopyroxene; after about three-quarters of the magma ocean had crystallized, lower-density plagioclase minerals could form and float into a crust atop. The final liquids to crystallize would have been initially sandwiched between the crust and mantle, with a high abundance of incompatible and heat-producing elements. Consistent with this perspective, geochemical mapping made from orbit suggests a crust of mostly anorthosite. The Moon rock samples of the flood lavas that erupted onto the surface from partial melting in the mantle confirm the mafic mantle composition, which is more iron-rich than that of Earth. The crust is on average about 50 kilometers (31 mi) thick.

However, the inner core of the Moon is small, with a radius of about 350 kilometers (220 mi) or less, around 20% of the radius of the Moon. Its composition is not well understood but is probably metallic iron alloyed with a small amount of sulfur and nickel. Analyses of the Moon's time-variable rotation suggest that it is at least partly molten. The pressure at the lunar core is estimated to be 5 GPa (49,000 atm).

=== Gravitational field ===
Astronaut John Young jumping on the Moon, illustrating that the gravitational pull of the Moon is approximately 1/6 of Earth's. The jumping height is limited by the combined weight of Young and his EVA space suit on the Moon of about 27 kg (60 lb) and by the suit's pressurization resisting the bending of the suit, as needed for jumping.

On average the Moon's surface gravity is 1.62 m/s^{2} (0.1654 g; 5.318 ft/s^{2}), about half of the surface gravity of Mars and about a sixth of Earth's. Among the planetary moons, it has the second highest surface gravity, after Io. It has an escape velocity of 2.38 km/s (8600 km/h; 5300 mph).

The Moon's gravitational field is not uniform. The details of the gravitational field have been measured through tracking the Doppler shift of radio signals emitted by orbiting spacecraft. The main lunar gravity features are mascons, large positive gravitational anomalies associated with some of the giant impact basins, partly caused by the dense mare basaltic lava flows that fill those basins. The anomalies greatly influence the orbit of spacecraft about the Moon. There are some puzzles: lava flows by themselves cannot explain all of the gravitational signature, and some mascons exist that are not linked to mare volcanism.

The sphere of influence of the Moon's gravity field, in which it dominates over Earth's, has a Hill radius of 60,000 km (i.e., extending less than one-sixth the distance of the 378,000 km between the Moon and the Earth), extending to the Earth–Moon lagrange points. This space is called cislunar space.

=== Magnetic field ===
The Moon has an external magnetic field of less than 0.2 nanoteslas, or less than one hundred thousandth that of Earth. The Moon does not have a global dipolar magnetic field; it only has crustal magnetization. The magnetic field history of the Moon is controversial, and there is still no consensus on the past intensity and timing of the Moons paleomagnetic field. Many paleomagnetic measurements have been taken from lunar samples collected during the Apollo missions. These measurements indicate that the Moon's paleomagnetic field experienced two epochs with distinct characteristics. In the first epoch (4.5 billion to 3.56 billion years ago), magnetic field intensities reached around 100 microteslas (1 Gauss), close to that of Earth's today. The second epoch was much longer (3.58 billion to 1 billion years ago), yet much weaker, with strengths only reaching 5-7 microteslas. It is unlikely that a single convection mechanism, thermal or compositional, generated this specific dynamo history without external influence. Theoretically, some of the remnant magnetization may originate from transient magnetic fields generated during large impacts through the expansion of plasma clouds. These clouds are generated during large impacts in an ambient magnetic field. This is supported by the location of the largest crustal magnetizations situated near the antipodes of the giant impact basins.

=== Atmosphere ===
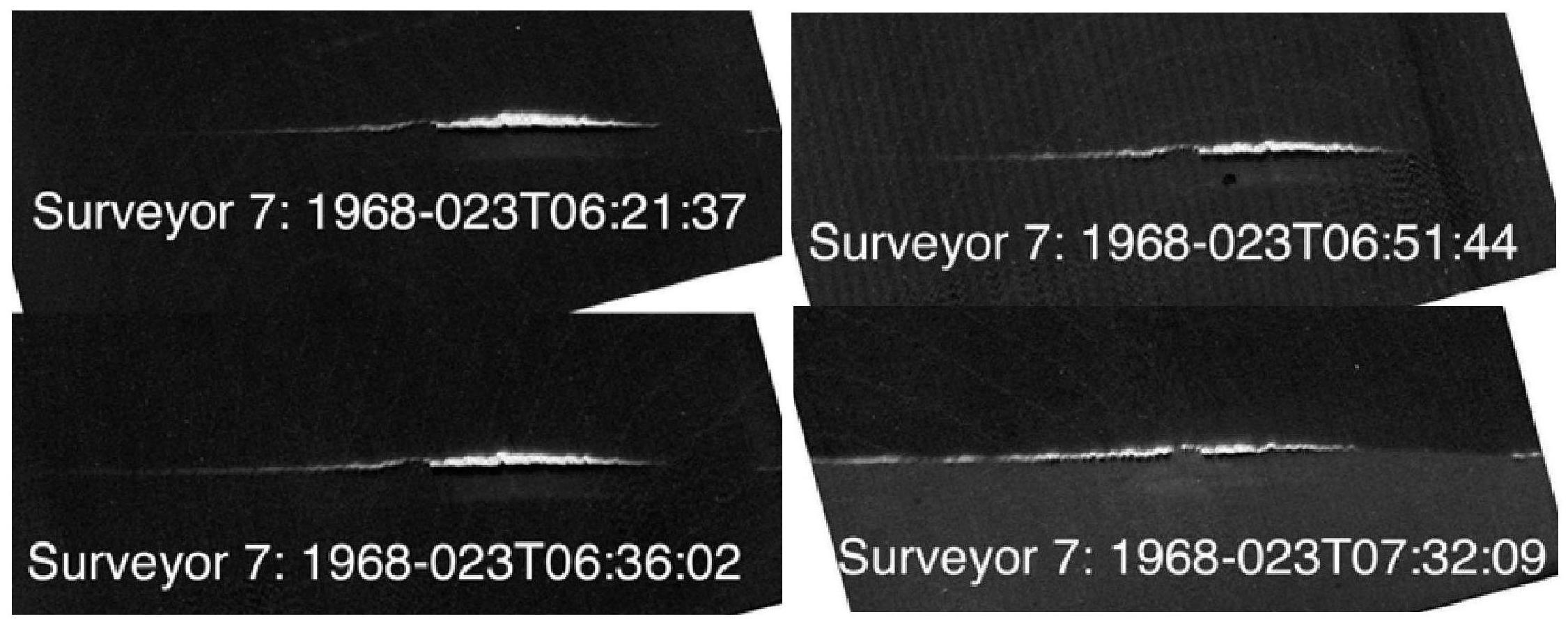
Surveyor 7 observes levitating dust, a phenomenon named Lunar horizon glow can be seen

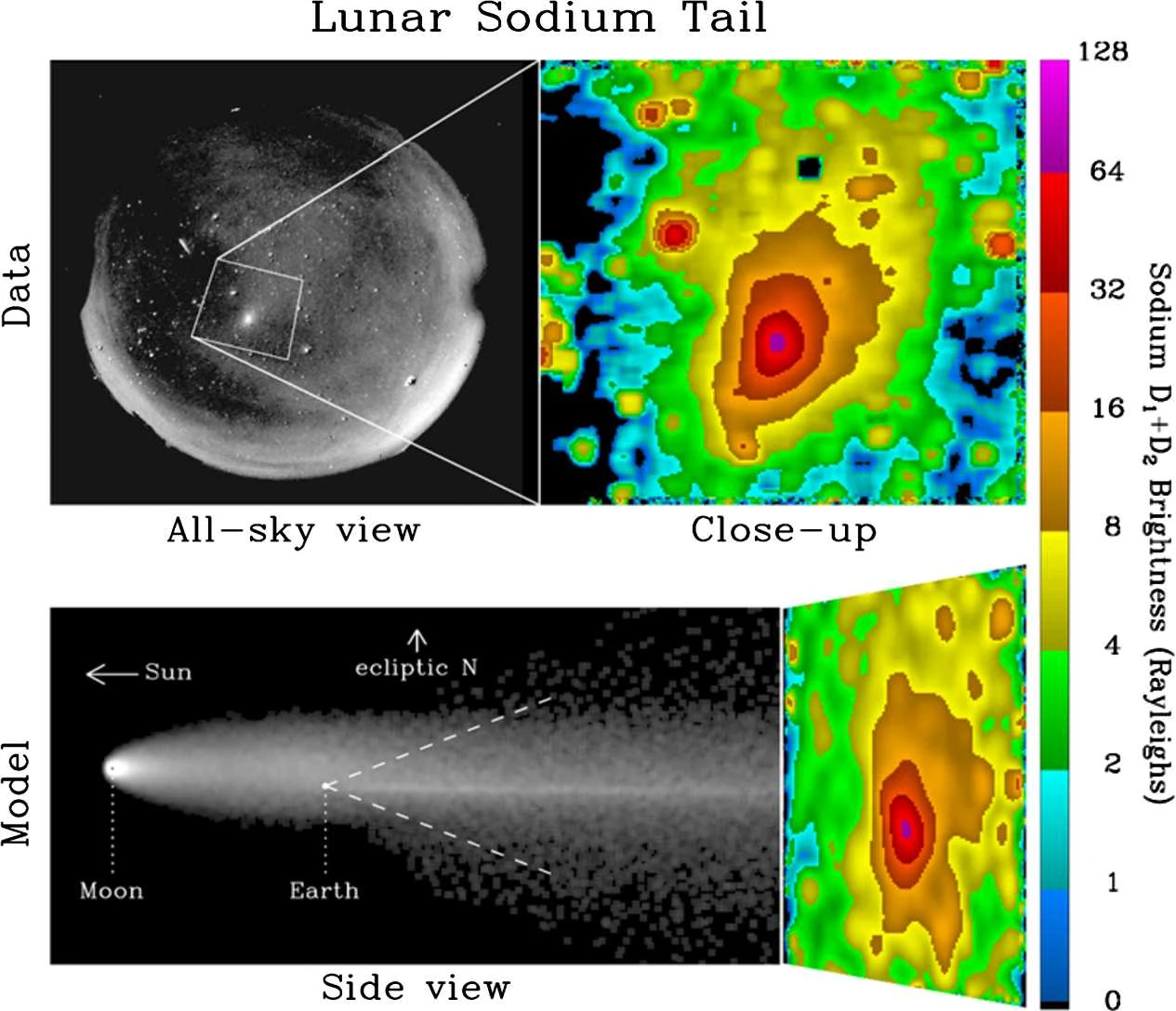
Observations and modeling of the Moon's sodium exosphere, tail and "spot".

The Moon has an atmosphere consisting of only an exosphere, which is so tenuous as to be nearly vacuum, with a total mass of less than 10 tonnes (9.8 long tons; 11 short tons). The surface pressure of this small mass is around 3 × 10^{−15} atm (0.3 nPa); it varies with the lunar day. Its sources include outgassing and sputtering, a product of the bombardment of lunar soil by solar wind ions. Elements that have been detected include sodium and potassium, produced by sputtering (also found in the atmospheres of Mercury and Io); helium-4 and neon from the solar wind; and argon-40, radon-222, and polonium-210, outgassed after their creation by radioactive decay within the crust and mantle. The absence of such neutral species (atoms or molecules) as oxygen, nitrogen, carbon, hydrogen and magnesium, which are present in the regolith, is not understood. Water vapor has been detected by Chandrayaan-1 and found to vary with latitude, with a maximum at ~60–70 degrees; it is possibly generated from the sublimation of water ice in the regolith. These gases either return into the regolith because of the Moon's gravity or are lost to space, either through solar radiation pressure or, if they are ionized, by being swept away by the solar wind's magnetic field.

Studies of Moon magma samples retrieved by the Apollo missions demonstrate that the Moon had once possessed a relatively thick atmosphere for a period of 70 million years between 3 and 4 billion years ago. This atmosphere, sourced from gases ejected from lunar volcanic eruptions, was twice the thickness of that of present-day Mars. The ancient lunar atmosphere was eventually stripped away by the solar wind and dissipated into space.

=== Surface features ===
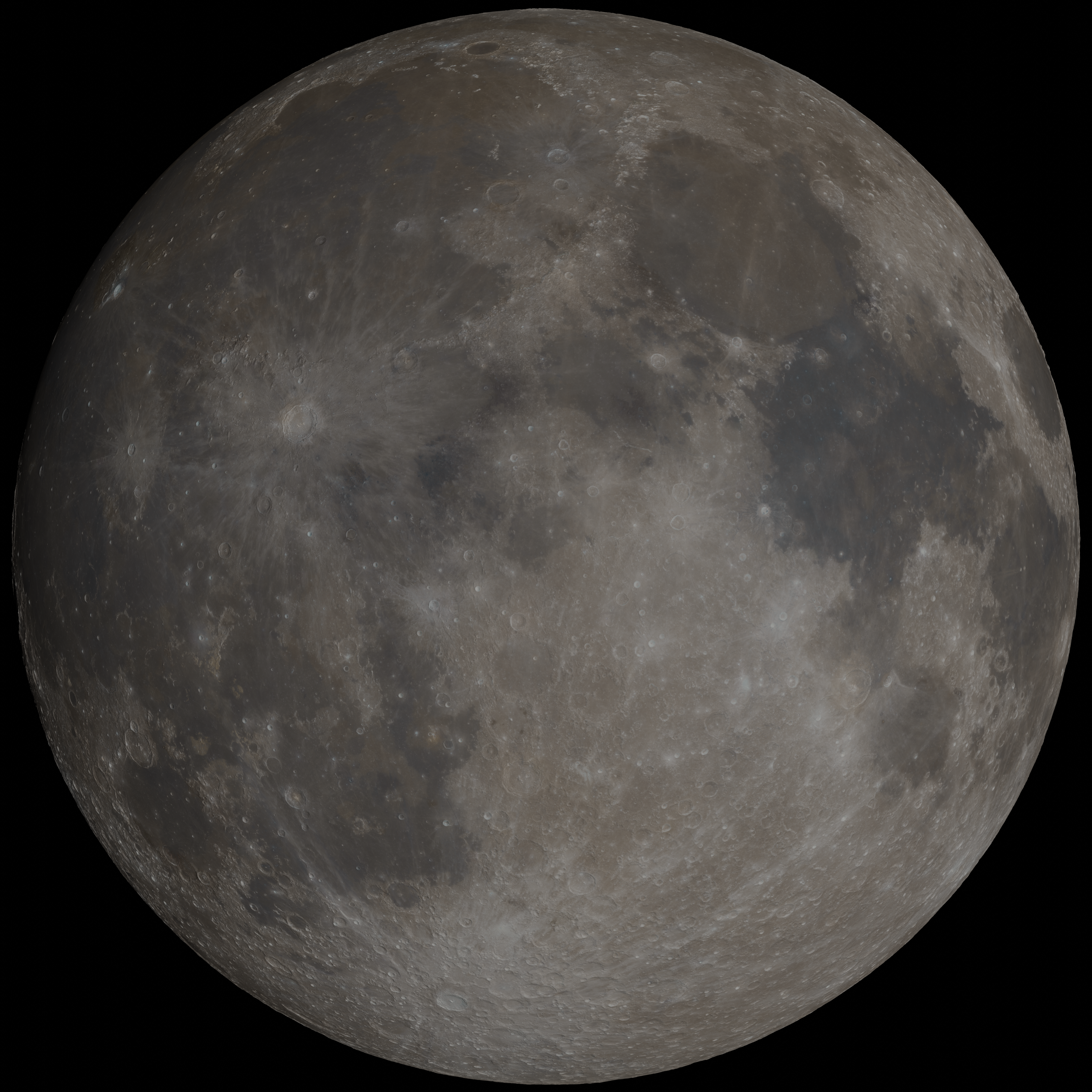
Near side of the Moon

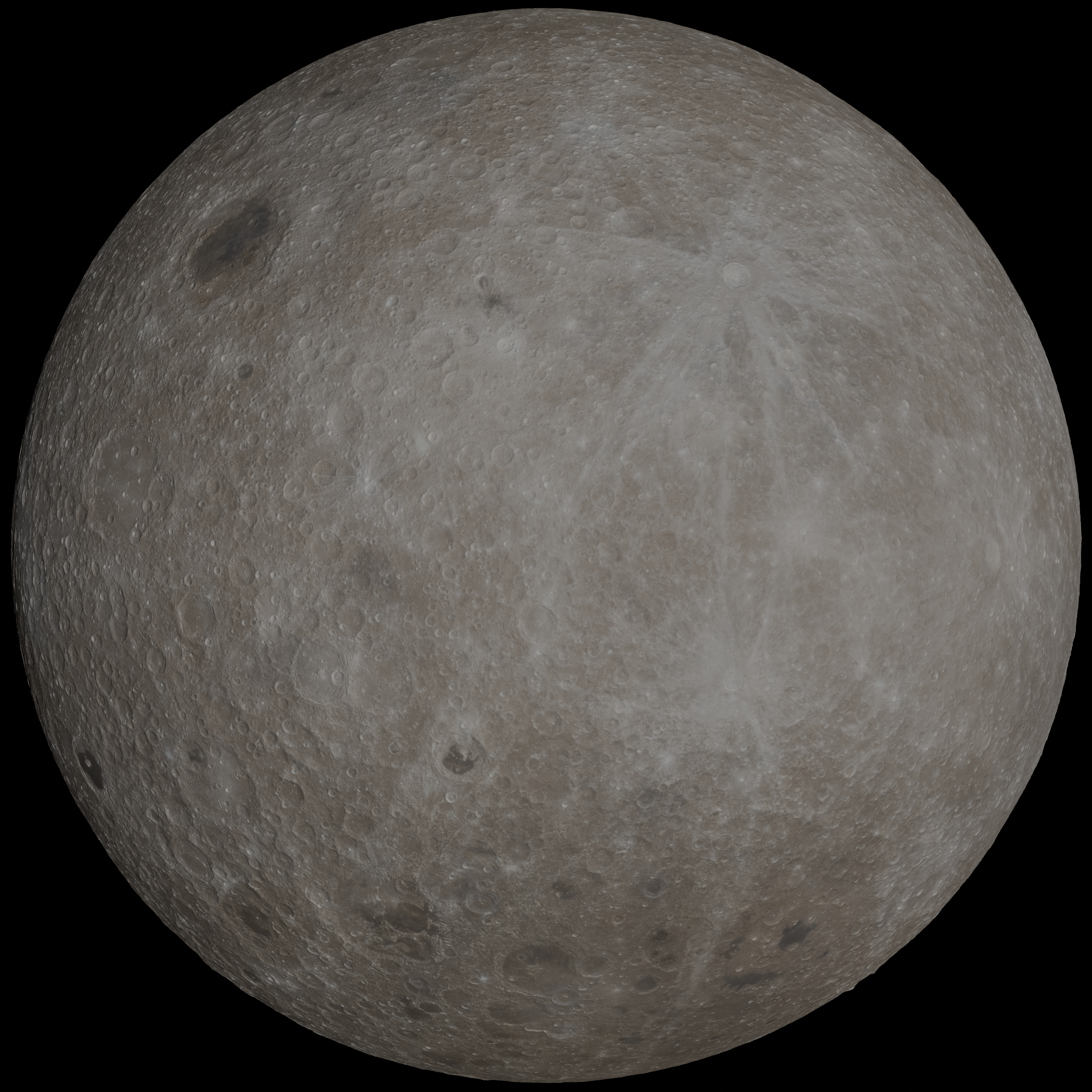
Far side of the Moon

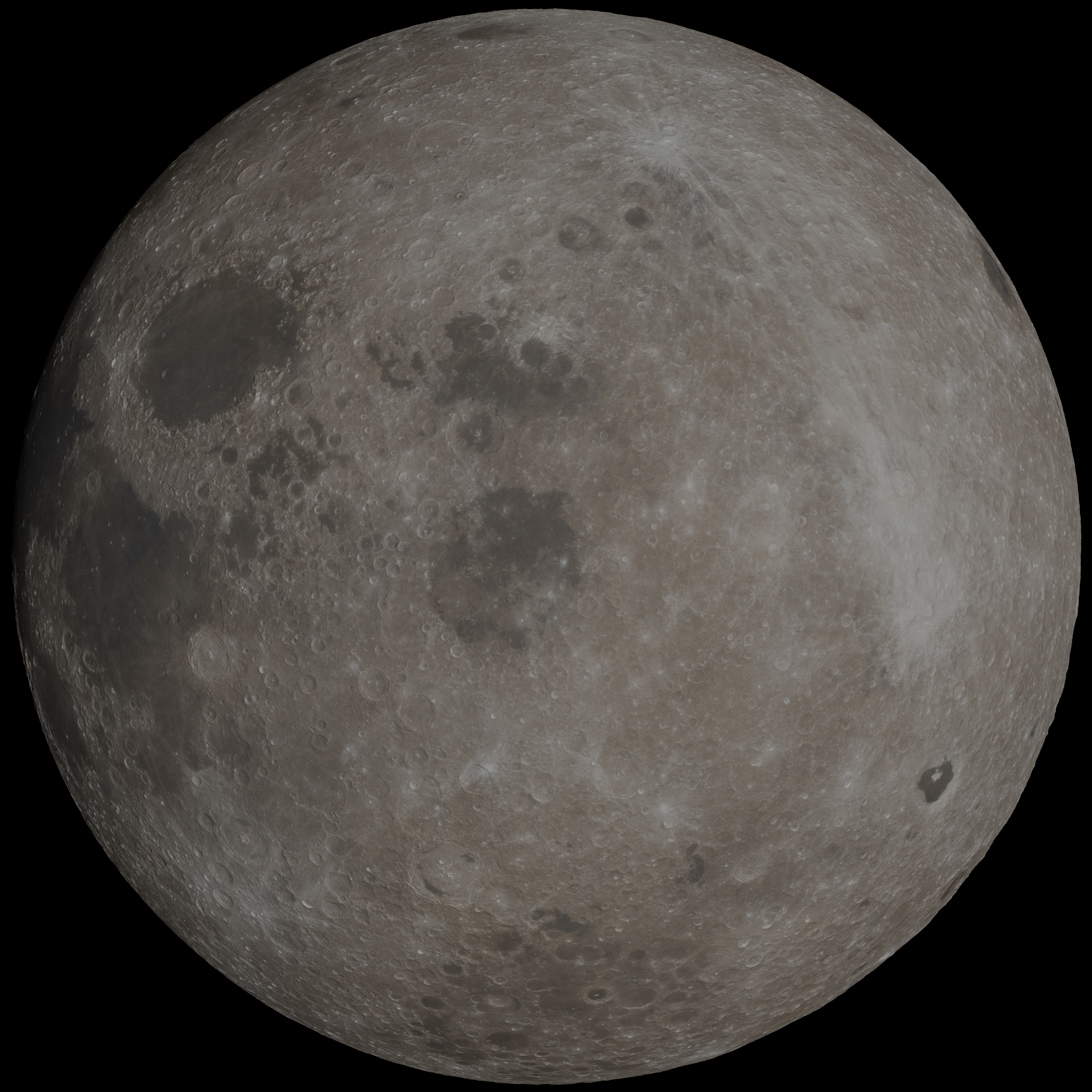
East side

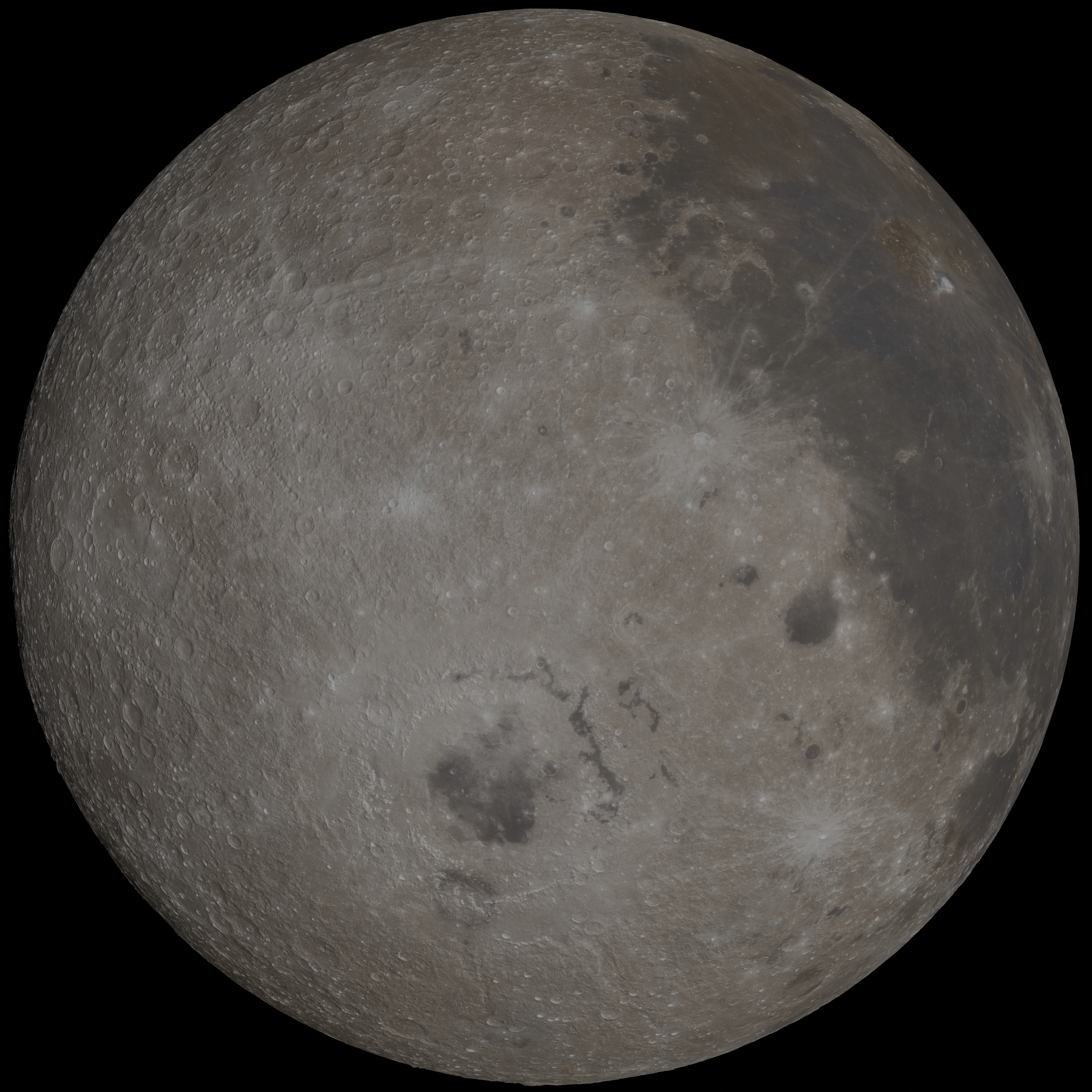
West side

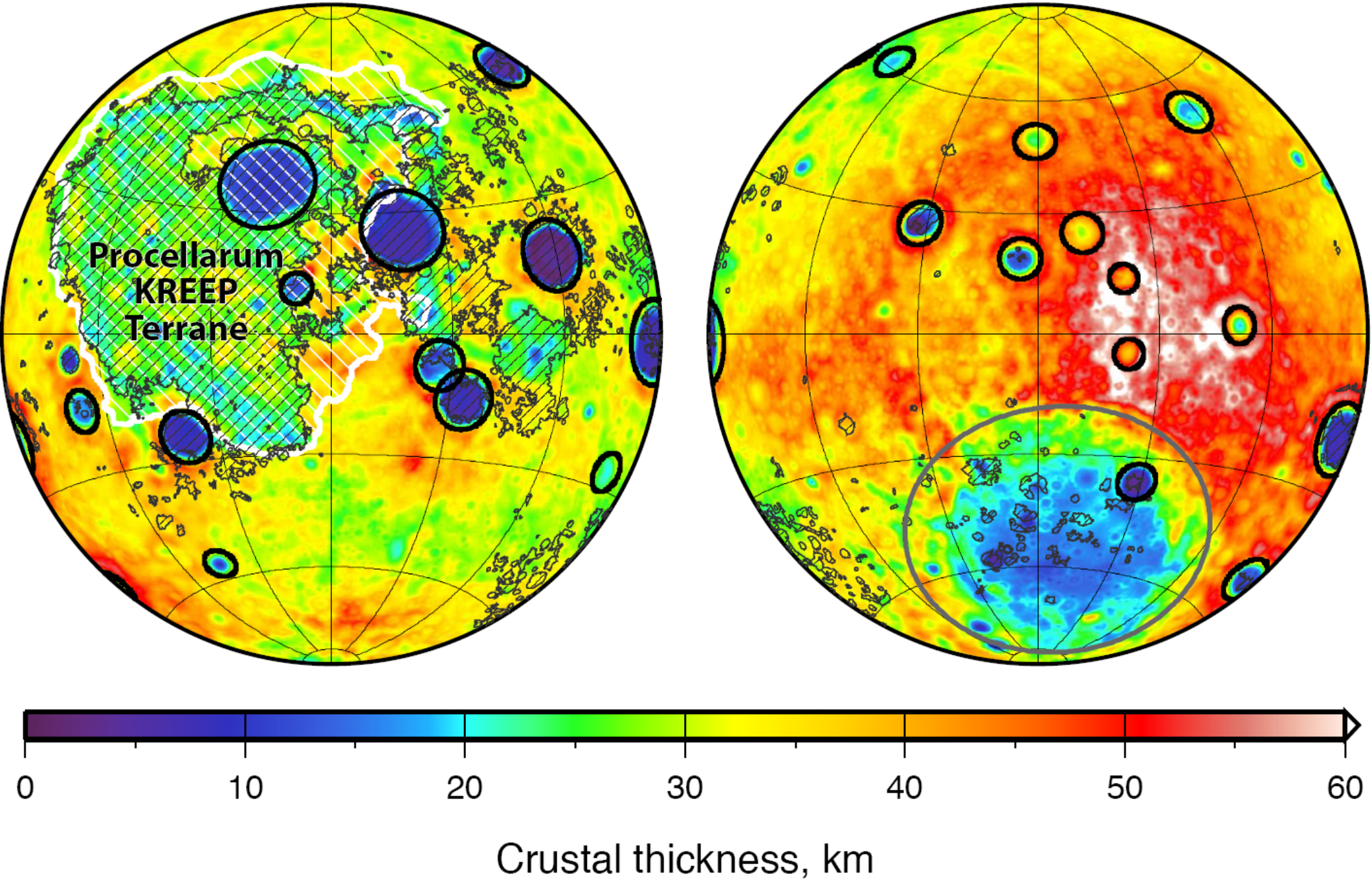
Map of the Moon colored by the thickness of the crust, with main regions marked. The KREEP rich magma terrane (hatched), with its most prominent part labeled on the near side (left), the Mare Procellarum KREEP Terrane (PKT). The South Pole–Aitken Terrane (SPAT) is marked on the far side (right, largest circle). The 24 crater basins with crustal thinning greater than 200 km (120 mi) are marked (black circles) across both hemispheres. The rest is the high-thickness Felspathic Highlands Terrane (FHT; red and white).

The topography of the Moon has been measured with laser altimetry and stereo image analysis. Its most extensive topographic feature is the giant far-side South Pole–Aitken basin, some 2,240 km (1,390 mi) in diameter, the largest crater on the Moon and the second-largest confirmed impact crater in the Solar System. At 13 km (8.1 mi) deep, its floor is the lowest point on the surface of the Moon, reaching −9.178 kilometers (−5.703 mi) at 70.368°S 172.413°W in a crater within Antoniadi crater. The highest elevations of the Moon's surface, with the so-called Selenean summit at 10.629 kilometers (6.605 mi), are located directly to the northeast (5.441°N 158.656°W), which might have been thickened by the oblique formation impact of the South Pole–Aitken basin. Other large impact basins such as Imbrium, Serenitatis, Crisium, Smythii, and Orientale possess regionally low elevations and elevated rims. The far side of the lunar surface is on average about 1.9 km (1.2 mi) higher than that of the near side.

==== Volcanic features ====
Map of the near side of the Moon, with the dark lunar maria, the most prominent volcanic features of the Moon, labeled in blue (brown labels are prominent lunar craters)

The main features visible from Earth by the naked eye are dark and relatively featureless lunar plains called maria (sing. mare; from Latin meaning 'seas', as they were once believed to be filled with water) which are vast solidified pools of ancient basaltic lava. Although similar to terrestrial basalts, lunar basalts have more iron and no minerals altered by water. The majority of these lava deposits erupted or flowed into the depressions associated with impact basins, though the Moon's largest expanse of basalt flooding, Oceanus Procellarum, does not correspond to an obvious impact basin. Different episodes of lava flow in maria can often be recognized by variations in surface albedo and distinct flow margins.

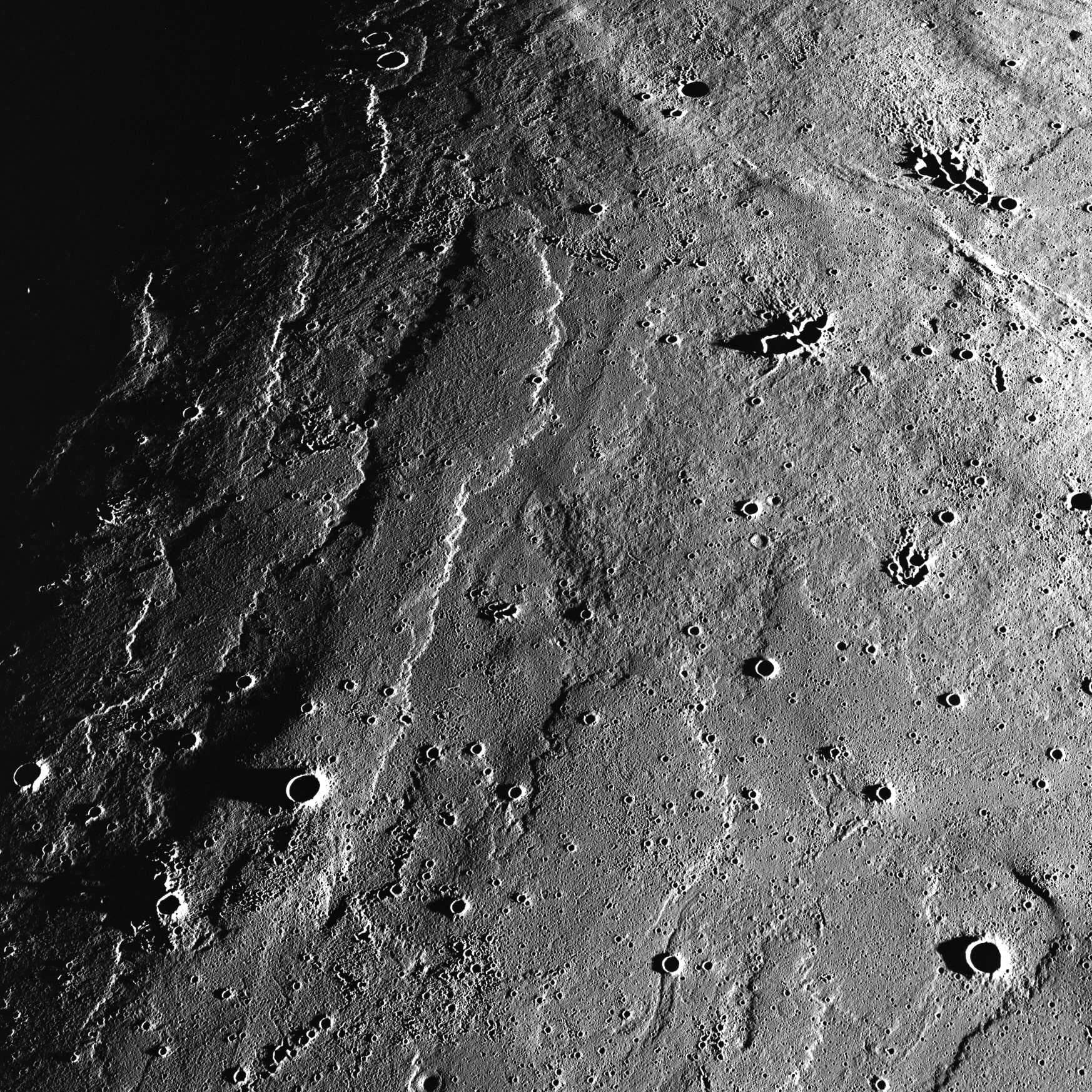
Old hardened lava flows of Mare Imbrium forming wrinkle ridges.

As the maria formed, cooling and contraction of the basaltic lava created wrinkle ridges in some areas. Sinuous rilles, found in and around maria, are likely extinct lava channels or collapsed lava tubes.

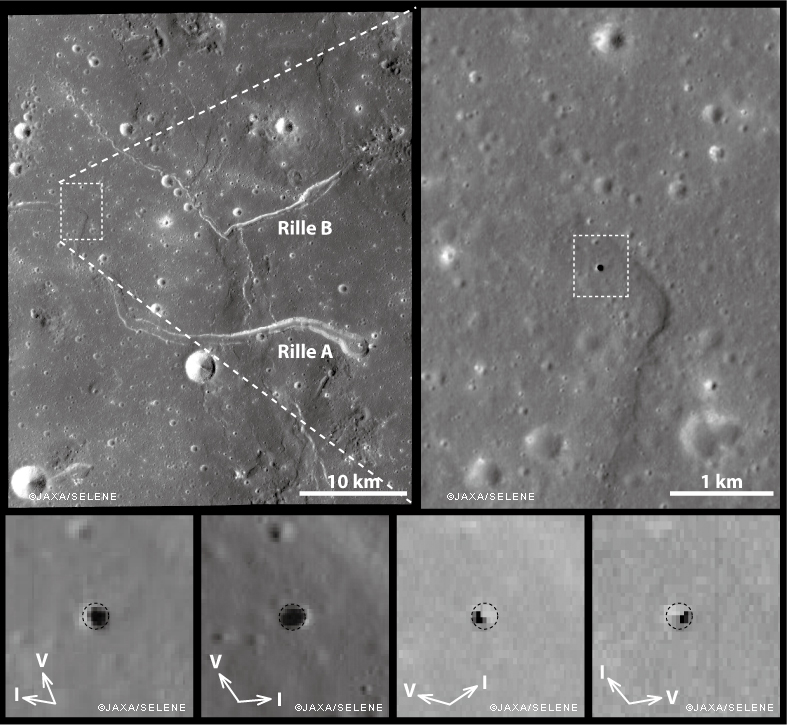
Sinuous rilles features and lunar lava tube cave Marius Hills pit as observed under different solar illumination conditions.

Mare volcanism has altered impact craters in various ways, including filling them to varying degrees, and raising and fracturing their floors from uplift of mare material beneath their interiors. Almost all maria are on the near side of the Moon, and cover 31% of the surface of the near side compared with 2% of the far side. This is likely due to a concentration of heat-producing elements under the crust on the near side, which would have caused the underlying mantle to heat up, partially melt, rise to the surface and erupt.

Evidence of recent lunar volcanism has been identified at 70 irregular mare patches, some less than 50 million years old.

The lighter-colored regions of the Moon are called terrae, or more commonly highlands, because they are higher than most maria. They have been radiometrically dated to having formed 4.4 billion years ago and may represent plagioclase cumulates of the lunar magma ocean. In contrast to Earth, no major lunar mountains are believed to have formed as a result of tectonic events.

==== Impact craters ====
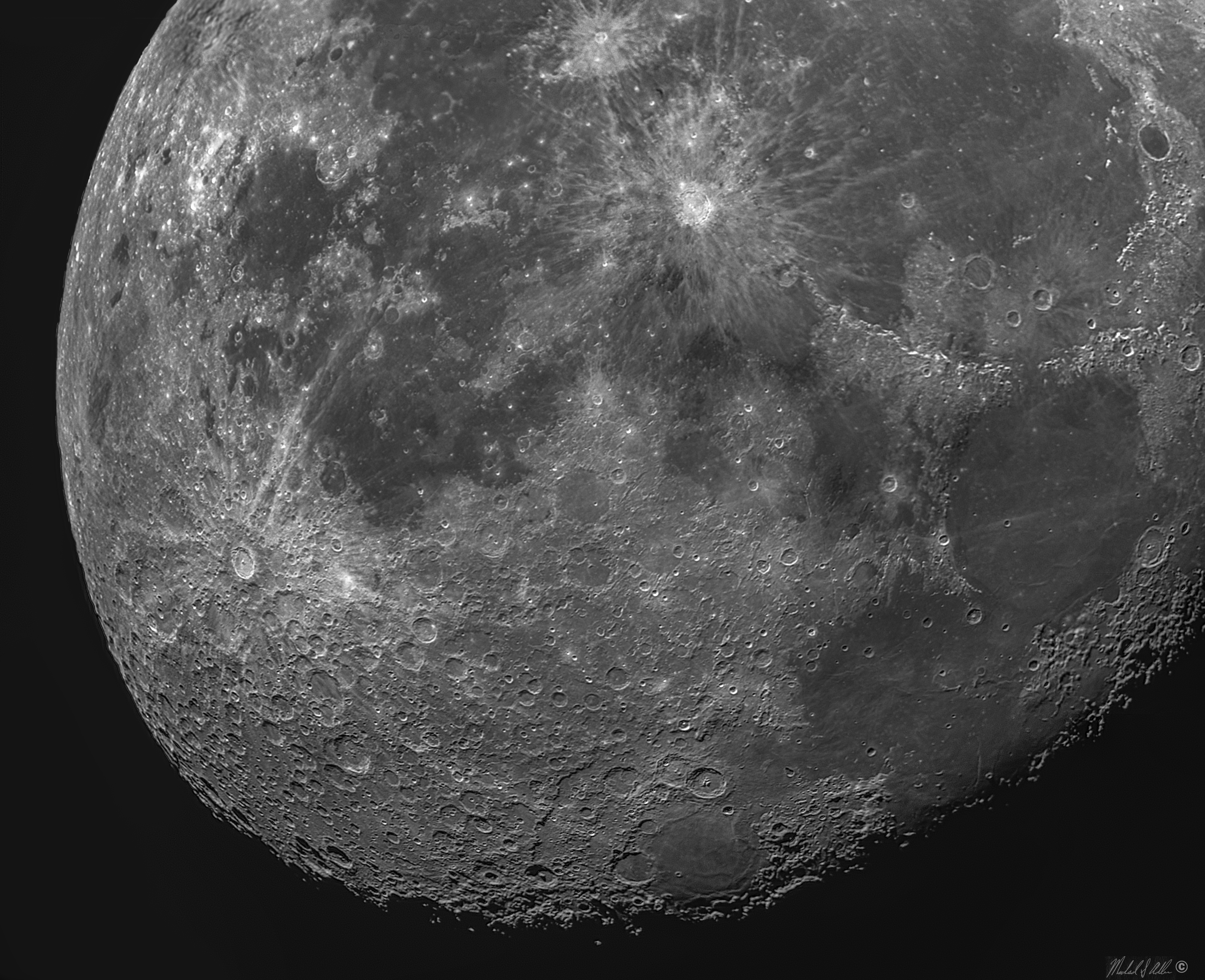
The heavily cratered surface of the Moon, particularly where no mare formed, is discernable when viewed close up, with crater ridges highlighted at the terminator and the two most prominent craters on the near side, Tycho (left) and Copernicus (top) visible, featuring long bright impact-streaks.

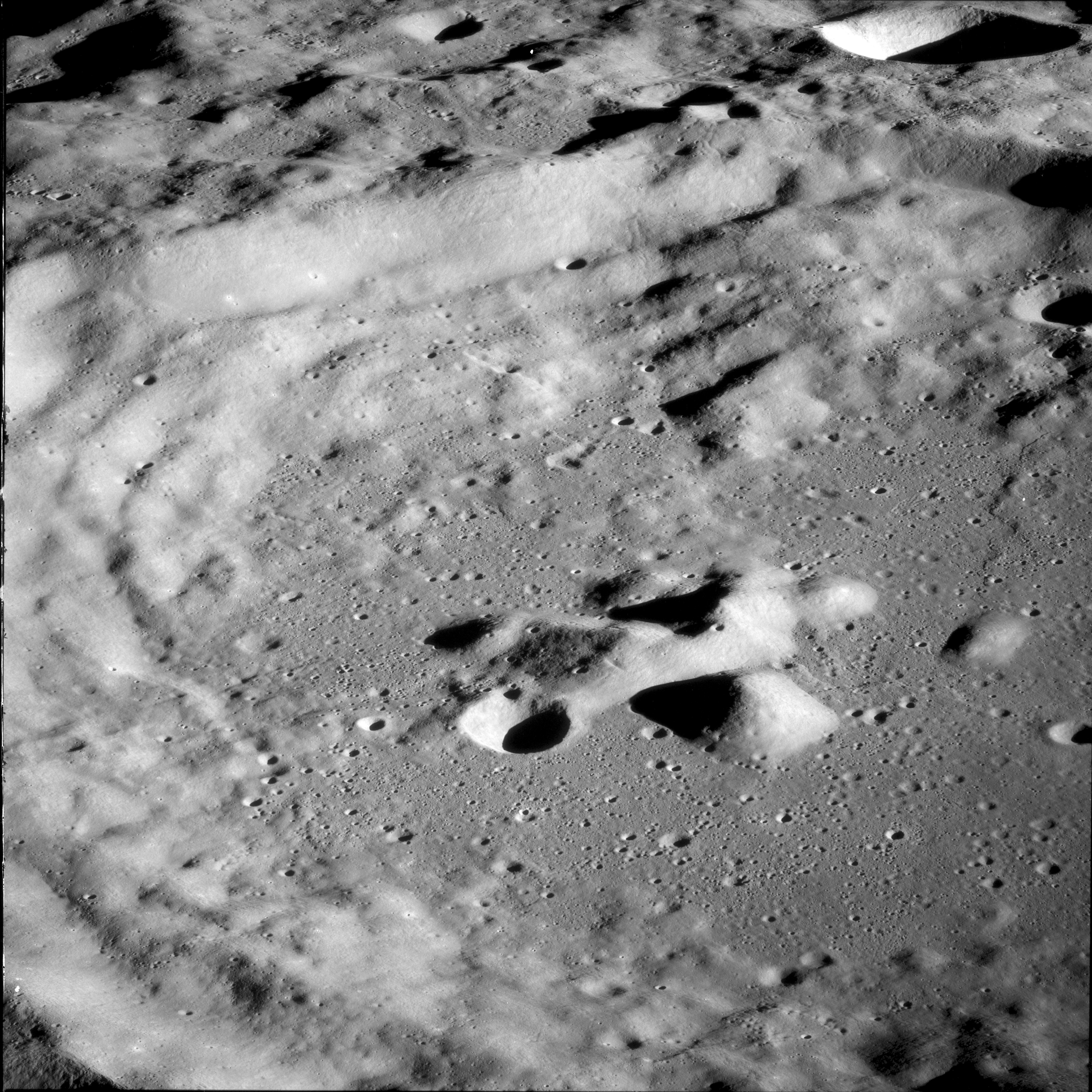
A view of a larger crater, the three-kilometer-deep Daedalus on the Moon's far side

Apollo 17 astronaut Harrison H. Schmitt next to the large Moon boulder nicknamed "Tracy's Rock" in the Taurus–Littrow of the Mare Serenitatis on the near side of the Moon

A major geologic process that has affected the Moon's surface is impact cratering, with craters formed when asteroids and comets collide with the lunar surface. There are estimated to be roughly 300,000 craters wider than 1 km (0.6 mi) on the Moon's near side. Lunar craters exhibit a variety of forms, depending on their size. In order of increasing diameter, the basic types are simple craters with smooth bowl shaped interiors and upturned rims, complex craters with flat floors, terraced walls and central peaks, peak ring basins, and multi-ring basins with two or more concentric rings of peaks. The vast majority of impact craters are circular, but some, like Cantor and Janssen, have more polygonal outlines, possibly guided by underlying tectonic rifts. Others, such as the Messier pair, Schiller, and Daniell, are elongated. Such elongation can result from highly oblique impacts, binary asteroid impacts, fragmentation of impactors before surface strike, or closely spaced secondary impacts.

==== Lunar swirls ====
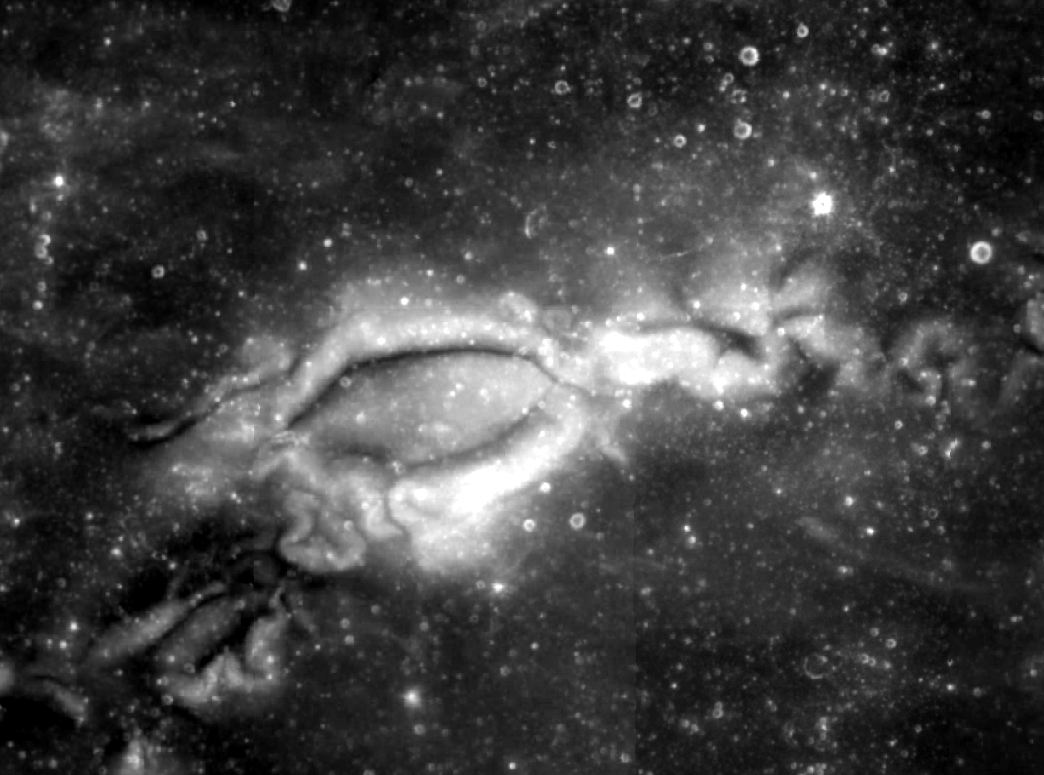
Wide-angle image of a lunar swirl, the 70-kilometer-long Reiner Gamma

Lunar swirls are enigmatic features found across the Moon's surface. They are characterized by a high albedo, appear optically immature (i.e. have the optical characteristics of a relatively young regolith), and often have a sinuous shape. Their shape is often accentuated by low albedo regions that wind between the bright swirls. They are located in places with enhanced surface magnetic fields and many are located at the antipodal point of major impacts. Well known swirls include the Reiner Gamma feature and Mare Ingenii. They are hypothesized to be areas that have been partially shielded from the solar wind, resulting in slower space weathering.

== Surface conditions and habitability ==
Ionizing radiation from cosmic rays, their resulting neutron radiation, and the Sun results in an average radiation level of 1.369 millisieverts per day during lunar daytime, which is about 2.6 times more than the level on the International Space Station, 5–10 times more than the level during a trans-Atlantic flight, and 200 times more than the level on Earth's surface. For further comparison, radiation levels average about 1.84 millisieverts per day on a flight to Mars and about 0.64 millisieverts per day on Mars itself, with some locations on Mars possibly having levels as low as 0.342 millisieverts per day.

The lunar surface is exposed to temperature differences ranging from 120 °C to −171 °C depending on the solar irradiance. Because of the lack of atmosphere, temperatures of different areas vary particularly upon whether they are in sunlight or shadow, making topographical details play a decisive role on local surface temperatures. Parts of many craters, particularly the bottoms of many polar craters, are permanently shadowed. These craters of eternal darkness have extremely low temperatures. The Lunar Reconnaissance Orbiter measured the lowest summer temperatures in craters at the southern pole at 35 K (−238 °C; −397 °F) and just 26 K (−247 °C; −413 °F) close to the lunar winter solstice in the north polar crater Hermite. This is the coldest temperature in the Solar System ever measured by a spacecraft, colder even than the surface of Pluto.

Lunar night is the darkest on the far side and during lunar eclipses on the near side (and darker than a moonless night on Earth). During its night, the near side is illuminated by Earthlight to the extent that lunar surface features may be observable from Earth. Earthshine makes the night on the near side about 43 times brighter, and sometimes even 55 times brighter than a night on Earth illuminated by the light of the full moon.

These extreme conditions are considered to make it unlikely for spacecraft to harbor bacterial spores at the Moon for longer than just one lunar orbit.

=== Regolith and dust ===
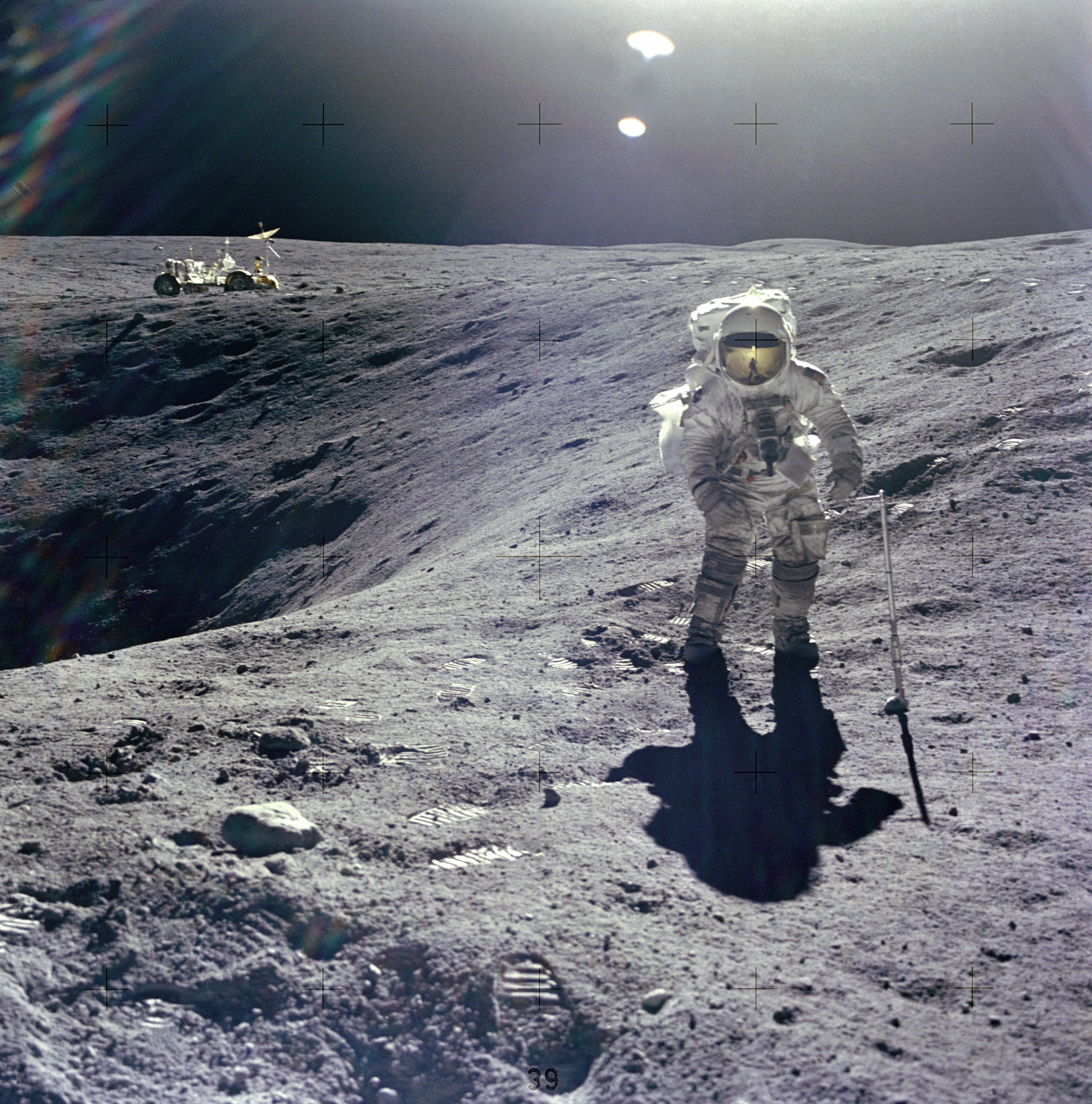
Astronaut Charles Duke working on the Moon with his suit covered in lunar dust. Lunar dust is highly abrasive and can cause damage to human lungs and nervous and cardiovascular systems.

Blanketed on top of the Moon's crust is a highly comminuted (broken into ever smaller particles) and impact gardened mostly gray surface layer called regolith, formed by impact processes. The finer regolith, the lunar soil of silicon dioxide glass, has a texture resembling snow and a scent resembling spent gunpowder. The regolith of older surfaces is generally thicker than for younger surfaces: it varies in thickness from 10–15 m (33–49 ft) in the highlands and 4–5 m (13–16 ft) in the maria. Beneath the finely comminuted regolith layer is the megaregolith, a layer of highly fractured bedrock many kilometers thick.

A permanent Moon dust cloud exists around the Moon, generated by small particles from comets. 5 tons of comet particles are estimated to strike the Moon's surface every 24 hours, resulting in the ejection of dust particles. The dust stays above the Moon for approximately 10 minutes, taking 5 minutes to rise, and 5 minutes to fall. On average, 120 kilograms of dust are present above the Moon, rising up to 100 kilometers above the surface. Dust counts made by LADEE's Lunar Dust EXperiment (LDEX) found particle counts peaked during the Geminid, Quadrantid, Northern Taurid, and Omicron Centaurid meteor showers, when the Earth, and Moon pass through comet debris. The lunar dust cloud is asymmetric, being denser near the boundary between the Moon's dayside and nightside.

Solar radiation also electrically charges the highly abrasive lunar dust and makes it levitate. This effect contributes to the easy spread of the sticky, lung- and gear-damaging lunar dust.

=== Presence of water ===
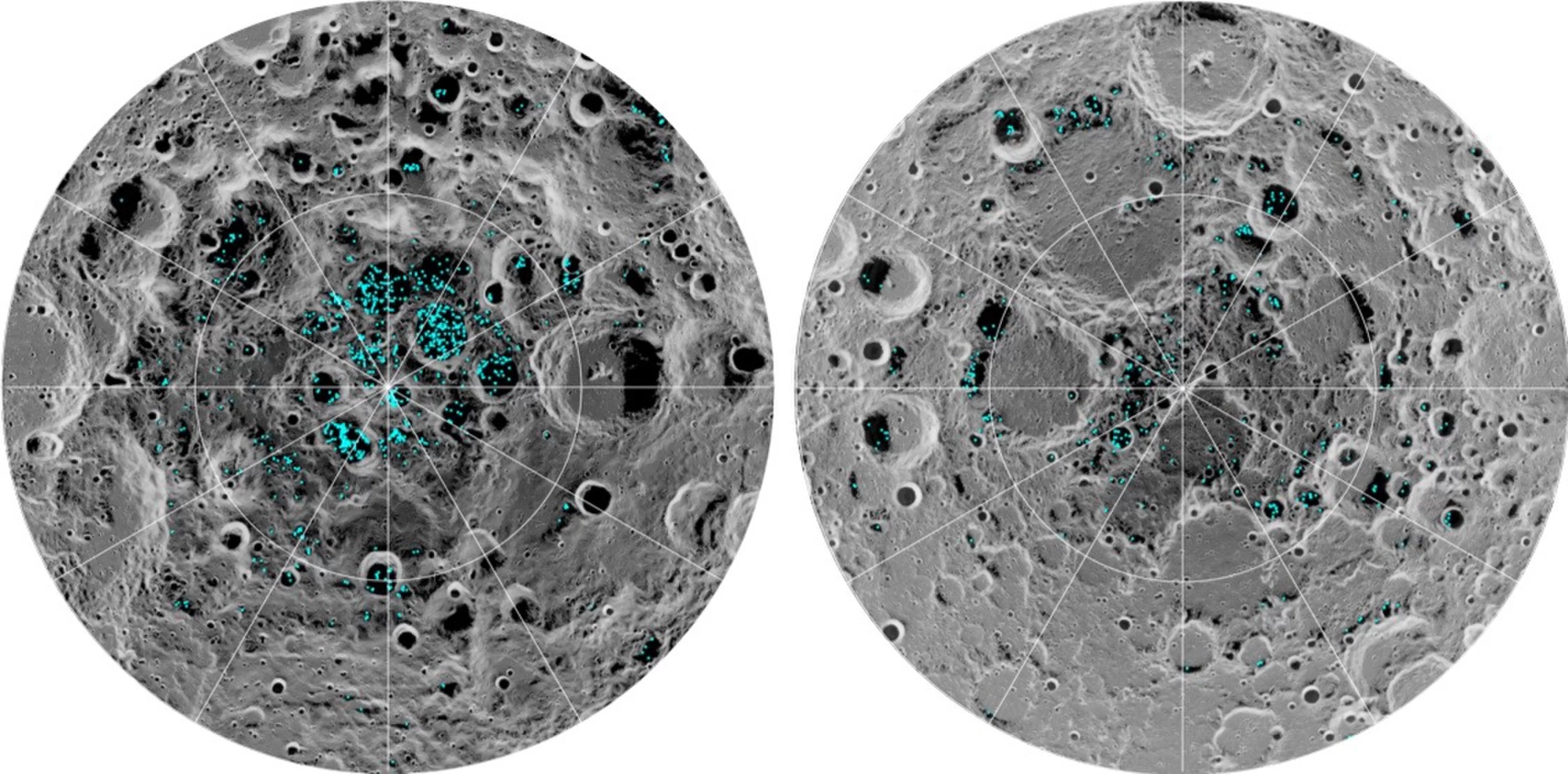
Distribution of surface ice at the Moon's South (left) and North poles (right), as viewed by NASA's Moon Mineralogy Mapper (M^{3}) spectrometer onboard India's Chandrayaan-1 orbiter

Liquid water cannot persist on the lunar surface. When exposed to solar radiation, water quickly decomposes through a process known as photodissociation and is lost to space. However, since the 1960s, scientists have hypothesized that water ice may be deposited by impacting comets or possibly produced by the reaction of oxygen-rich lunar rocks, and hydrogen from solar wind, leaving traces of water which could possibly persist in cold, permanently shadowed craters at either pole on the Moon. Computer simulations suggest that up to 14,000 km^{2} (5,400 sq mi) of the surface may be in permanent shadow. The presence of usable quantities of water on the Moon is an important factor in rendering lunar habitation as a cost-effective plan; the alternative of transporting water from Earth would be prohibitively expensive.

In years since, signatures of water have been found to exist on the lunar surface. In 1994, the bistatic radar experiment located on the Clementine spacecraft, indicated the existence of small, frozen pockets of water close to the surface. However, later radar observations by Arecibo, suggest these findings may rather be rocks ejected from young impact craters. In 1998, the neutron spectrometer on the Lunar Prospector spacecraft showed that high concentrations of hydrogen are present in the first meter of depth in the regolith near the polar regions. Volcanic lava beads, brought back to Earth aboard Apollo 15, showed small amounts of water in their interior.

The 2008 Chandrayaan-1 spacecraft has since confirmed the existence of surface water ice, using the on-board Moon Mineralogy Mapper. The spectrometer observed absorption lines common to hydroxyl, in reflected sunlight, providing evidence of large quantities of water ice, on the lunar surface. The spacecraft showed that concentrations may possibly be as high as 1,000 ppm. Using the mapper's reflectance spectra, indirect lighting of areas in shadow confirmed water ice within 20° latitude of both poles in 2018. In 2009, LCROSS sent a 2,300 kg (5,100 lb) impactor into a permanently shadowed polar crater, and detected at least 100 kg (220 lb) of water in a plume of ejected material. Another examination of the LCROSS data showed the amount of detected water to be closer to 155 ± 12 kg (342 ± 26 lb).

In May 2011, 615–1410 ppm water in melt inclusions in lunar sample 74220 was reported, the famous high-titanium "orange glass soil" of volcanic origin collected during the Apollo 17 mission in 1972. The inclusions were formed during explosive eruptions on the Moon approximately 3.7 billion years ago. This concentration is comparable with that of magma in Earth's upper mantle.

Analysis of the findings of the Moon Mineralogy Mapper (M3) revealed in August 2018 for the first time "definitive evidence" for water-ice on the lunar surface. The data revealed the distinct reflective signatures of water-ice, as opposed to dust and other reflective substances. The ice deposits were found on the North and South poles, although it is more abundant in the South, where water is trapped in permanently shadowed craters and crevices, allowing it to persist as ice on the surface since they are shielded from the sun.

In October 2020, astronomers reported detecting molecular water on the sunlit surface of the Moon by several independent spacecraft, including the Stratospheric Observatory for Infrared Astronomy (SOFIA).

=== Living on the Moon ===
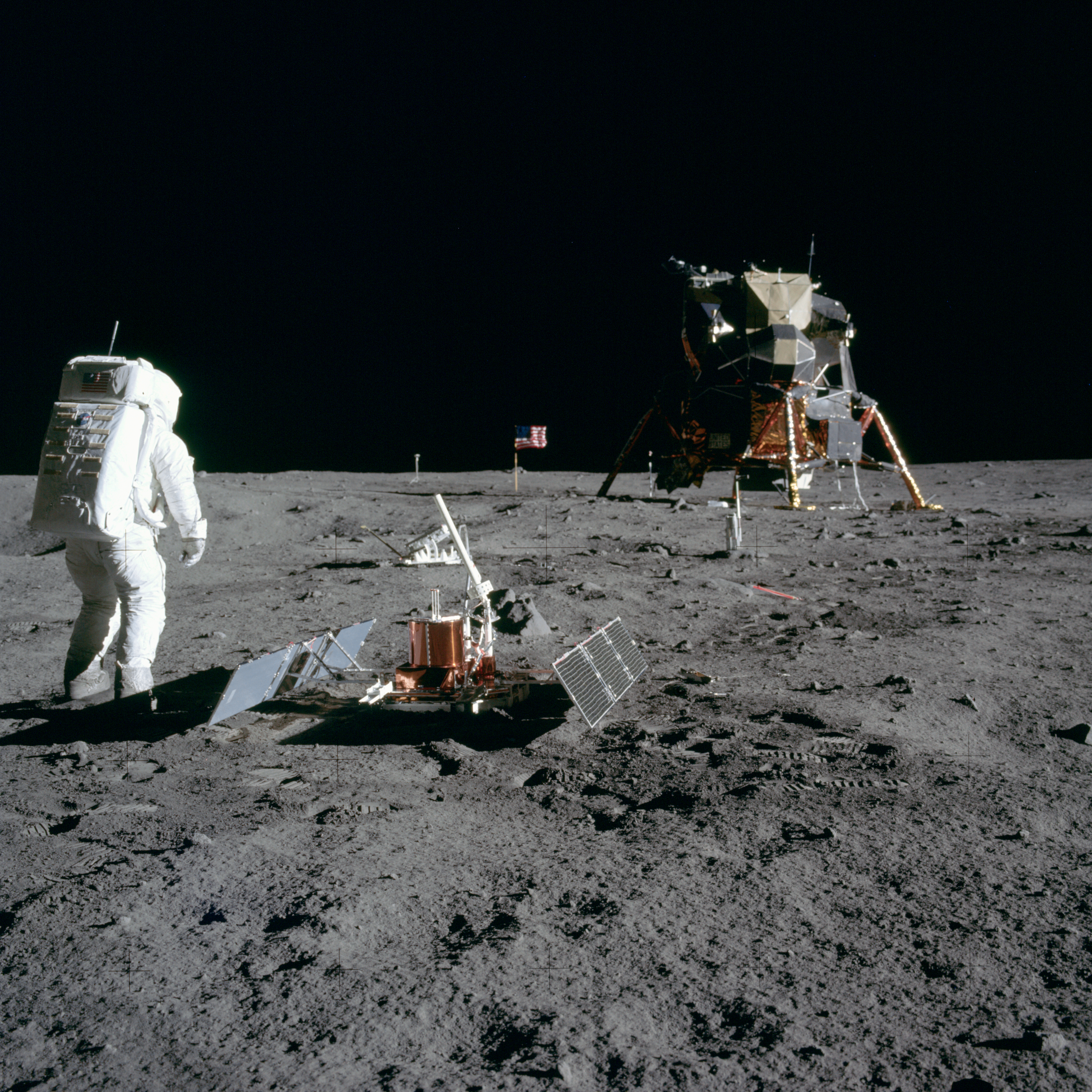
Astronaut Buzz Aldrin in life-supporting suit looking back at the first lunar habitat and base, the Lunar Module Eagle of Tranquility Base, during Apollo 11 (1969), the first crewed Moon landing

Humans have lived on the Moon in groups of two and for up to three days. Altogether twelve people have stayed on the Moon over the course of six visits. They all lived in one type of surface habitat, the Apollo Lunar Module. In the course of these stays some people have spent in total up to one day roaming the surface.

Challenges when roaming the surface arise from lunar dust sticking to suits and tools, and has been carried inside the habitats. Astronauts could taste and smell the dust, which smells like gunpowder and was called the "Apollo aroma". This fine lunar dust can cause health issues.

In 2019, at least one plant seed sprouted in an experiment on the Chang'e 4 lander. It was carried from Earth along with other small life in its Lunar Micro Ecosystem.

Because the Moon is tidally locked, and only shows one face to Earth, a permanent lunar presence will require a constellation of satellites to relay signals from the Moon's far side, as well as over its topographically inhibitive south pole. The Chinese Queqiao-1 and -2 satellites are already in place, and NASA plans the Lunar Communications Relay and Navigation Systems (LCRNS) for November 2026.

Scientists have confirmed the presence of a cave on the Moon near the Sea of Tranquility, not far from the 1969 Apollo 11 landing site. The cave, identified as an entry point to a collapsed lava tube, is roughly 45 meters wide and up to 80 m long. This discovery marks the first confirmed entry point to a lunar cave. The analysis was based on photos taken in 2010 by NASA's Lunar Reconnaissance Orbiter. The cave's stable temperature of around 17 °C could provide a hospitable environment for future astronauts, protecting them from extreme temperatures, solar radiation, and micrometeorites. However, challenges include accessibility and risks of avalanches and cave-ins. This discovery offers potential for future lunar bases or emergency shelters.

== Earth–Moon system ==
=== Orbit ===
A Sun-synchronous view of the day-side of Earth from the Sun–Earth Lagrange point L1, with Earth rotating and the Moon passing on its orbit in between the observing DSCOVR satellite and Earth, showing the Moon's far side when it is illuminated and the Moon's day-side

The semi-major axis of the geocentric lunar orbit, called the lunar distance, is approximately 385,000 km (239,000 mi), or 1.3 light-seconds, comparable to going around Earth approximately 9.6 times. (Note: The mean distance of the Moon from the Earth is $384401$ km. The equatorial radius of Earth is $6.378136 \cdot 10^6$meters. Multiplying by $2\pi$ to convert from equatorial radius to equatorial circumference results in $4.007501 \cdot 10^7$ meters, or $40075.01 km$. Dividing the two results in a ratio of $9.59$.) The Moon's orbit is not perfectly circular but rather slightly elliptical, with an orbital eccentricity of 0.055. This means the distance between the Moon and Earth varies from around 356,400 km (221,500 mi) (perigee) to 406,700 km (252,700 mi) (apogee), making the Moon's distance and apparent size fluctuate up to 14%.

The Earth–Moon system has a shared center of mass, or barycenter, which is located 5,000 km (3,100 mi) (about 3/4 of Earth's radius) from the Earth's center. Both the Earth and the Moon actually orbit this center of mass, so Earth wobbles around this point for every orbit the Moon makes. This barycenter is slowly moving outward as tidal friction drains energy from the rotating pair, and eventually the barycenter will be outside the Earth.

The Moon makes a complete orbit around Earth with respect to the fixed stars, its sidereal period, about once every 27.3 days. (Note: More accurately, the Moon's mean sidereal period (fixed star to fixed star) is 27.321661 days (27 d 07 h 43 min 11.5 s), and its mean tropical orbital period (from equinox to equinox) is 27.321582 days (27 d 07 h 43 min 04.7 s) (Explanatory Supplement to the Astronomical Ephemeris, 1961, at p.107).) However, because the Earth–Moon system moves at the same time in its orbit around the Sun, it takes slightly longer to return to the same lunar phase, 29.5 days, (Note: More accurately, the Moon's mean synodic period (between mean solar conjunctions) is 29.530589 days (29 d 12 h 44 min 02.9 s) (Explanatory Supplement to the Astronomical Ephemeris, 1961, at p.107).) completing a full cycle as seen from Earth. This synodic period or synodic month is commonly known as the lunar month and is equal to the length of the solar day on the Moon.

The Moon's orbital plane maintains a relatively constant inclination, about 5 degrees, relative to Earth's orbit around the Sun (the ecliptic). The direction of this tilt gradually rotates westward, called nodal precession, completing a circle once every 18.61 years. This means that the Moon's orbit changes its tilt relative to Earth's equator from 18 to 28 degrees in that time. The shape of the orbit rotates as well, along the plane of the Moon's orbit, called apsidal precession. Measured from the intersection points of the Moon's orbit with the ecliptic plane (which themselves move westward by nodal precession), it rotates eastward with a period of 8.85 years. Unlike most regular satellites of other planets, the Moon's orbital plane is closer to the ecliptic plane than to their planet's equatorial plane. The Moon's orbit is subtly perturbed by the Sun and Earth in many small, complex and interacting ways. These follow-on effects are mathematically described by Cassini's laws.

Minimum, mean and maximum distances of the Moon from Earth with its angular diameter as seen from Earth's surface to scale

=== Rotation ===
Comparison between the Moon on the left, rotating tidally locked (correct), and with the Moon on the right, without rotation (incorrect)

Due to it being tidally locked to Earth, the Moon has a 1:1 spin–orbit resonance. The rotation–orbit ratio means the Moon's orbital period around Earth is equal to its rotation period, called synchronous rotation. This results in it always keeping nearly the same face turned towards the Earth as it orbits. The side of the Moon that faces Earth is called the near side, and the opposite the far side. Since the Moon is not tidally locked to the Sun, lunar daylight and night times both occur around the Moon. The far side is often inaccurately called the "dark side", but it is in fact illuminated as often as the near side: once every 29.5 Earth days. During dark moon to new moon, the near side is dark.

The moon's axial tilt with respect to the ecliptic is 1.5427°, so in each draconic year (346.62 days), the sun moves from being 1.5427° north of the lunar equator to being 1.5427° south of it and then back. This is analogous to how, on Earth, the sun's position moves from the Tropic of Cancer to the Tropic of Capricorn and back every tropical year. This puts the poles of the moon in darkness (or with only part of the sun visible) for half a draconic year and in sunlight for half a draconic year. The amount of sunlight falling on horizontal areas near the poles depends on the altitude angle of the sun. These seasons have little effect in more equatorial areas.

Frictional effects associated with tidal deformations caused by the heavier body (Earth) resulted in the lighter body becoming tidally locked (as the Moon currently is). The Moon originally rotated at a faster rate, but early in its history its rotation slowed and became tidally locked in this orientation. With time, the energy of rotation of the Moon on its axis was dissipated as heat, until there was no net rotation of the Moon relative to Earth. In 2016, planetary scientists using data collected on the 1998–99 NASA Lunar Prospector mission found two hydrogen-rich areas (most likely former water ice) on opposite sides of the Moon. It is speculated that these patches were the poles of the Moon billions of years ago before it was tidally locked to Earth.

=== Tidal effects ===
Simplified diagram of Earth bulging, being pulled and stretched toward the Moon by its gravity, which is the main driver of the tides. The Ocean and Earth are being pulled more where it is closer to the Moon, causing tidal forces to be weaker at the far-side of Earth creating a second bulge and high-tide. The animation shows the change of the Moon's position on its inclined orbit.

The gravitational attraction that Earth and the Moon (as well as the Sun) exert on each other manifests in a slightly greater attraction on the sides closest to each other, resulting in tidal forces. Ocean tides are the most widely experienced result of this, but tidal forces also considerably affect other mechanics of Earth, as well as the Moon and their system.

The lunar solid crust experiences tides of around 10 cm (4 in) amplitude over 27 days, with three components: a fixed one due to Earth, because they are in synchronous rotation, a variable tide due to orbital eccentricity and inclination, and a small varying component from the Sun. The Earth-induced variable component arises from changing distance and libration, a result of the Moon's orbital eccentricity and inclination (if the Moon's orbit were perfectly circular and un-inclined, there would only be solar tides). According to recent research, scientists suggest that the Moon's influence on the Earth may contribute to maintaining Earth's magnetic field.

The cumulative effects of stress built up by these tidal forces produces moonquakes. Moonquakes are much less common and weaker than are earthquakes, although moonquakes can last for up to an hour – significantly longer than terrestrial quakes – because of scattering of the seismic vibrations in the dry fragmented upper crust. The existence of moonquakes was an unexpected discovery from seismometers placed on the Moon by Apollo astronauts from 1969 through 1972.

The most commonly known effect of tidal forces is elevated sea levels called ocean tides. While the Moon exerts most of the tidal forces, the Sun also exerts tidal forces and therefore contributes to the tides as much as 40% of the Moon's tidal force; producing in interplay the spring and neap tides.

The tides are two bulges in the Earth's oceans, one on the side facing the Moon and the other on the side opposite. As the Earth rotates on its axis, one of the ocean bulges (high tide) is held in place "under" the Moon, while another such tide is opposite. The tide under the Moon is explained by the Moon's gravity being stronger on the water close to it. The tide on the opposite side can be explained either by the centrifugal force as the Earth orbits the barycenter or by the water's inertia as the Moon's gravity is stronger on the solid Earth close to it and it is pulled away from the farther water.

Thus, there are two high tides, and two low tides in about 24 hours. Since the Moon is orbiting the Earth in the same direction of the Earth's rotation, the high tides occur about every 12 hours and 25 minutes; the 25 minutes is due to the Moon's time to orbit the Earth.

=== System evolution ===
Delays in the tidal peaks of both ocean and solid-body tides cause torque in opposition to the Earth's rotation. This "drains" angular momentum and rotational kinetic energy from Earth's rotation, slowing the Earth's rotation. The angular momentum, lost from the rotation of the Earth, is transferred to the Moon in a process known as tidal acceleration, which lifts the Moon into a higher orbit while lowering orbital speed around the Earth. Thus the distance between Earth and Moon is increasing, and the Earth's rotation is slowing in reaction. Measurements from laser reflectors left during the Apollo missions (lunar ranging experiments) have found that the Moon's distance increases by 38 mm (1.5 in) per year (roughly the rate at which human fingernails grow). Atomic clocks show that Earth's Day lengthens by about 17 microseconds every year.

Over time this tidal drag causes the Earth's rotation and the Moon's orbital period to match. 3.2 billion years ago, during the Archean, the solar day was only around 13 hours. Theoretically, in 50 billion years, the Earth's rotation will slow to match the Moon's orbital period, causing the Earth to always present the same side to the Moon. Long before this would happen, however, the Sun will become a red giant, possibly engulfing the Earth and the Moon. If the Earth–Moon system survives this engulfment, as a 2026 study suggests, the drag from the solar atmosphere could cause the orbit of the Moon to decay. Once the orbit of the Moon closes to a distance of 18,470 km (11,480 mi), it will cross Earth's Roche limit and the tidal interaction with Earth would break the Moon apart. It would turn into a ring system, with most of the orbiting rings decaying and falling to Earth.

== Observation ==
=== Apparent size and position ===
The Moon appears in Earth's sky differently depending on the position of observation on Earth and the time of lunar year, lunar month and day on Earth. During a year the Moon culminates during a day at different altitudes. The full Moon appears highest in the sky during winter and lowest during summer, unlike the Sun, which is true for the seasons of both of Earth's northern and southern hemispheres.

At the North and South Poles the Moon is 24 hours above the horizon for two weeks every tropical month (about 27.3 days), comparable to the polar day of the tropical year. Zooplankton in the Arctic use moonlight when the Sun is below the horizon for months on end.

On average the Moon's angular diameter is about 0.52°, roughly the same apparent size as the Sun (see § Eclipses). Its apparent size and brightness vary due to its elliptical orbit, appearing up to 30% brighter and 14% larger at perigee compared to apogee. In addition, a purely psychological effect, known as the Moon illusion, makes the Moon appear larger when close to the horizon.

=== Orientation and appearance ===
Libration, the slight variation in the Moon's apparent size and viewing angle over a single lunar month as viewed from somewhere on the Earth's Northern Hemisphere.

The apparent orientation of the Moon depends on its position in the sky and the hemisphere of the Earth from which it is being viewed. In the Northern Hemisphere it appears upside down compared to the view from the Southern Hemisphere. Sometimes the "horns" of a crescent moon appear to be pointing more upwards than sideways. This phenomenon is called a wet moon and occurs more frequently in the tropics.

The tidally locked synchronous rotation of the Moon as it orbits the Earth results in only one side of the Moon, its so-called near side, being visible from Earth. That said, while the movement of the Moon is in resonance, it still is not without nuances such as libration, resulting in slightly changing perspectives, making over time and location on Earth about 59% of the Moon's surface visible from Earth. Due to lunar libration, it is sometimes possible to see slightly more than the full moon (up to about 101%) or a small part of its far side (up to 5%).

=== Phases ===
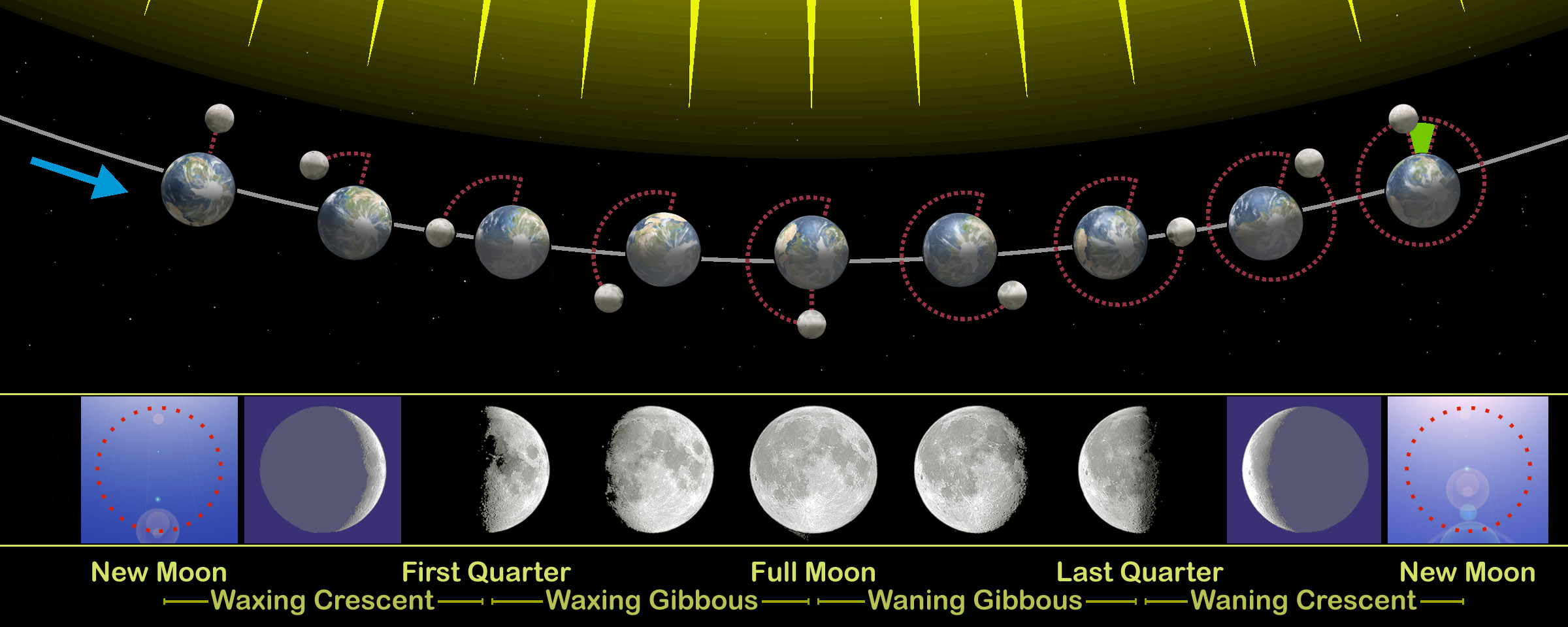
The monthly changes in the angle between the direction of sunlight and view from Earth, and the phases of the Moon that result, as viewed from the Northern Hemisphere. The Earth–Moon distance is not to scale.

The Moon rotates, as it orbits Earth, changing orientation toward the Sun, experiencing a lunar day. A lunar day is equal to one lunar month (one synodic orbit around Earth). The changing position of the illumination of the Moon by the Sun during a lunar day is observable from Earth as the changing lunar phases. The phases of the moon follow a repeating cycle, with its starting point at new moon. In the first half of the cycle, the sequence is new moon, crescent, quarter, gibbous, and full moon. In the second half of the cycle, the sequence is reversed, then the cycle repeats.

The brightness and apparent size of the Moon changes also due to its elliptic orbit around Earth. Consequently, given the same phase, the Moon's brightness also varies by up to 30% between apogee and perigee. At perigee (closest), since the Moon is up to 14% closer to Earth than at apogee (most distant), it subtends a solid angle which is up to 30% larger. A full (or new) moon at such a position is called a supermoon.

Each interval between two phases of the Moon lasts, on average, about seven days (approximately 7.38 days), but this duration can vary between 8 days 5 hours 10 minutes and 6 days 14 hours 24 minutes due to the change in the eccentricities in orbit between the Moon and Earth which affect their orbital speed.

The number of days since the most recent new moon is called the Moon's age. A complete cycle of lunar phases is known as a lunation.

The approximate age and phase of the Moon for any date can be calculated by determining the number of days since a known new moon (e.g., January 1, 1900, or August 11, 1999) and dividing that value by the average length of a synodic month (29.53059 days). The remainder of the division represents the Moon's age. This method assumes a perfectly circular orbit and does not consider the exact time of the new moon, so results can off to 7 hours. Accuracy decreases as the date moves away from the reference date. This simplified calculation is suitable for many purposes, but more precise applications require more complex calculation.

=== True albedo and color of the surface ===
The Moon's appearance is shaped by its reflective properties and surface composition. Its albedo is about 0.12, meaning it reflects 12% of the light that hits it. This is similar to an asteroid's albedo. Chromophore elements, iron and titanium, on the Moon surface absorb light, making areas like the lunar mares darker (lower albedo) than the highlands.

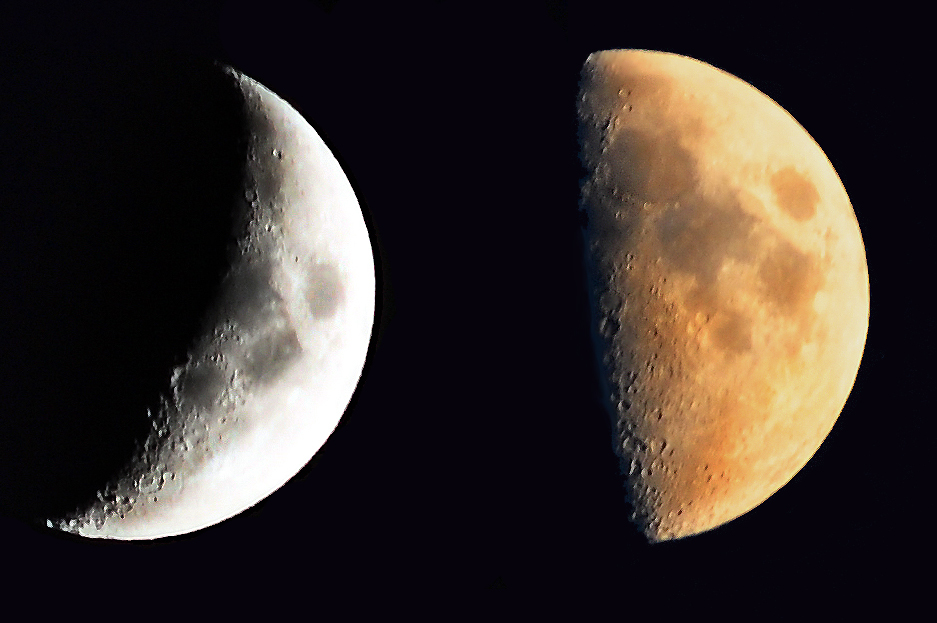
The changing apparent color of the Moon, filtered by Earth's atmosphere

The Moon's true color, without atmospheric effects, is a muted brownish-gray. From Earth, the Moon's color can be altered by the atmosphere, at times appearing red or blue. It may appear red during a lunar eclipse, because of the red spectrum of the Sun's light being refracted onto the Moon by Earth's atmosphere. Because of this red color, lunar eclipses are also sometimes called blood moons. The Moon can also seem red when it appears at low angles and through a thick atmosphere. The Moon may also appear blue depending on the presence of certain particles in the air, such as volcanic particles. Because the words "blood moon" and "blue moon" can also be used to refer to specific full moons of the year, they do not always refer to the presence of red or blue moonlight.

=== Eclipses ===
A solar eclipse causes the Sun to be covered, revealing the white corona.

The Moon, tinted reddish, during a lunar eclipse

Eclipses only occur when the Sun, Earth, and Moon are all in a straight line (termed "syzygy"). Solar eclipses occur at new moon, when the Moon is between the Sun and Earth. In contrast, lunar eclipses occur at full moon, when Earth is between the Sun and Moon. The apparent size of the Moon is roughly the same as that of the Sun, with both being viewed at close to one-half a degree wide. The Sun is much larger than the Moon, but it is the vastly greater distance that gives it the same apparent size as the much closer and much smaller Moon from the perspective of Earth. The variations in apparent size, due to the non-circular orbits, are nearly the same as well, though occurring in different cycles. This makes possible both total (with the Moon appearing larger than the Sun) and annular (with the Moon appearing smaller than the Sun) solar eclipses. In a total eclipse, the Moon completely covers the disc of the Sun and the solar corona becomes visible to the naked eye.

Because the distance between the Moon and Earth is very slowly increasing over time, the angular diameter of the Moon is decreasing. As the Sun evolves toward becoming a red giant, its size and its apparent diameter in the sky are slowly increasing. (Note: See graph in Sun#Life phases. At present, the diameter of the Sun is increasing at a rate of about five percent per billion years. This is very similar to the rate at which the apparent angular diameter of the Moon is decreasing as it recedes from Earth.) The combination of these two changes means that hundreds of millions of years ago, the Moon would always completely cover the Sun on solar eclipses, and no annular eclipses were possible. Likewise, hundreds of millions of years in the future, the Moon will no longer cover the Sun completely, and total solar eclipses will not occur.

As the Moon's orbit around Earth is inclined by about 5.145° (5° 9′) to the orbit of Earth around the Sun, eclipses do not occur at every full and new moon. For an eclipse to occur, the Moon must be near the intersection of the two orbital planes. The periodicity and recurrence of eclipses of the Sun by the Moon, and of the Moon by Earth, is described by the saros, which has a period of approximately 18 years.

Because the Moon continuously blocks the view of a half-degree-wide circular area of the sky, (Note: On average, the Moon covers an area of 0.21078 square degrees on the night sky.) the related phenomenon of occultation occurs when a bright star or planet passes behind the Moon and is occulted: hidden from view. In this way, a solar eclipse is an occultation of the Sun. Because the Moon is comparatively close to Earth, occultations of individual stars are not visible everywhere on the planet, nor at the same time. Because of the precession of the lunar orbit, each year different stars are occulted.

== Exploration of the Moon ==
=== Pre-telescopic observation (before 1609) ===
It is possible that the waxing and waning of the lunar phases were tracked to keep time in the oldest cave paintings of bulls and geometric shapes, from up to 40,000 years ago, or by the use of tally sticks from 20–30,000 years ago. Aspects of the Moon were identified and aggregated in lunar deities from prehistoric times and were eventually documented and put into symbols from the very first instances of writing in the 4th millennium BC. One of the earliest-discovered possible depictions of the Moon is a 3,000 BCE rock carving Orthostat 47 at Knowth, Ireland. The crescent depicting the Moon as with the lunar deity Nanna/Sin have been found from the 3rd millennium BC.

The oldest named astronomer and poet Enheduanna, Akkadian high priestess to the lunar deity Nanna/Sin and princess, daughter of Sargon the Great (c. 2334 – c. 2279 BCE), had the Moon tracked in her chambers. The oldest identified depiction of the Moon in an astronomical relation to other astronomical features is the Nebra sky disc from c. 1800–1600 BCE, depicting features like the Pleiades next to the Moon.

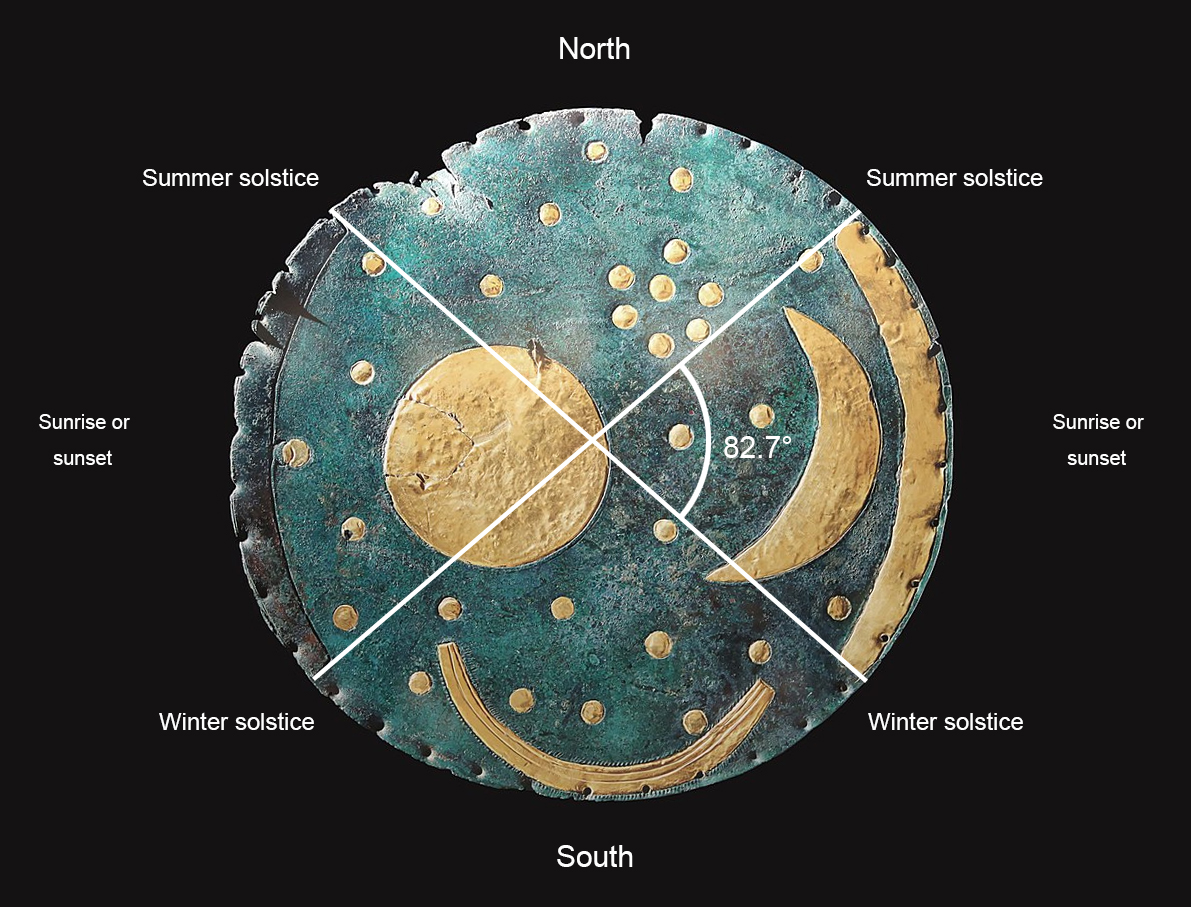
The Nebra sky disc (c. 1800–1600 BCE), found near a possible astronomical complex, most likely depicting the Sun or full Moon, the Moon as a crescent, the Pleiades and the summer and winter solstices as strips of gold on the side of the disc, with the top representing the horizon and north.

The ancient Greek philosopher Anaxagoras (d. 428 BC) reasoned that the Sun and Moon were both giant spherical rocks, and that the Moon reflected the Sun's light. Elsewhere in the 5th century BC to 4th century BC, Babylonian astronomers had recorded the 18-year Saros cycle of lunar eclipses, and Indian astronomers had described the Moon's monthly elongation. The Chinese astronomer Shi Shen (fl. 4th century BC) gave instructions for predicting solar and lunar eclipses.

In Aristotle's (384–322 BC) description of the universe, the Moon marked the boundary between the spheres of the mutable elements (earth, water, air and fire), and the imperishable stars of aether, an influential concept from Aristotelian physics that would dominate for centuries. Archimedes (287–212 BC) designed a planetarium that could calculate the motions of the Moon and other objects in the Solar System. In the 2nd century BC, Seleucus of Seleucia correctly thought that tides were due to the attraction of the Moon, and that their height depends on the Moon's position relative to the Sun. In the same century, Aristarchus computed the size and distance of the Moon from Earth, obtaining a value of about twenty times the radius of Earth for the distance.

The Chinese of the Han dynasty believed the Moon to be energy equated to qi and their 'radiating influence' theory recognized that the light of the Moon was merely a reflection of the Sun; Jing Fang (78–37 BC) noted the sphericity of the Moon. Ptolemy (90–168 AD) greatly improved on the numbers of Aristarchus, calculating a mean distance of 59 times Earth's radius and a diameter of 0.292 Earth diameters, close to the correct values of about 60 and 0.273 respectively. In 510 AD, the Indian astronomer Aryabhata mentioned in his Aryabhatiya that reflected sunlight is the cause of the shining of the Moon. The astronomer and physicist Ibn al-Haytham (965–1039) found that sunlight was not reflected from the Moon like a mirror, but that light was emitted from every part of the Moon's sunlit surface in all directions. Shen Kuo (1031–1095) of the Song dynasty created an allegory equating the waxing and waning of the Moon to a round ball of reflective silver that, when doused with white powder and viewed from the side, would appear to be a crescent. During the Middle Ages, before the invention of the telescope, the Moon was increasingly recognized as a sphere, though many believed that it was "perfectly smooth".

=== Telescopic exploration (1609–1959) ===
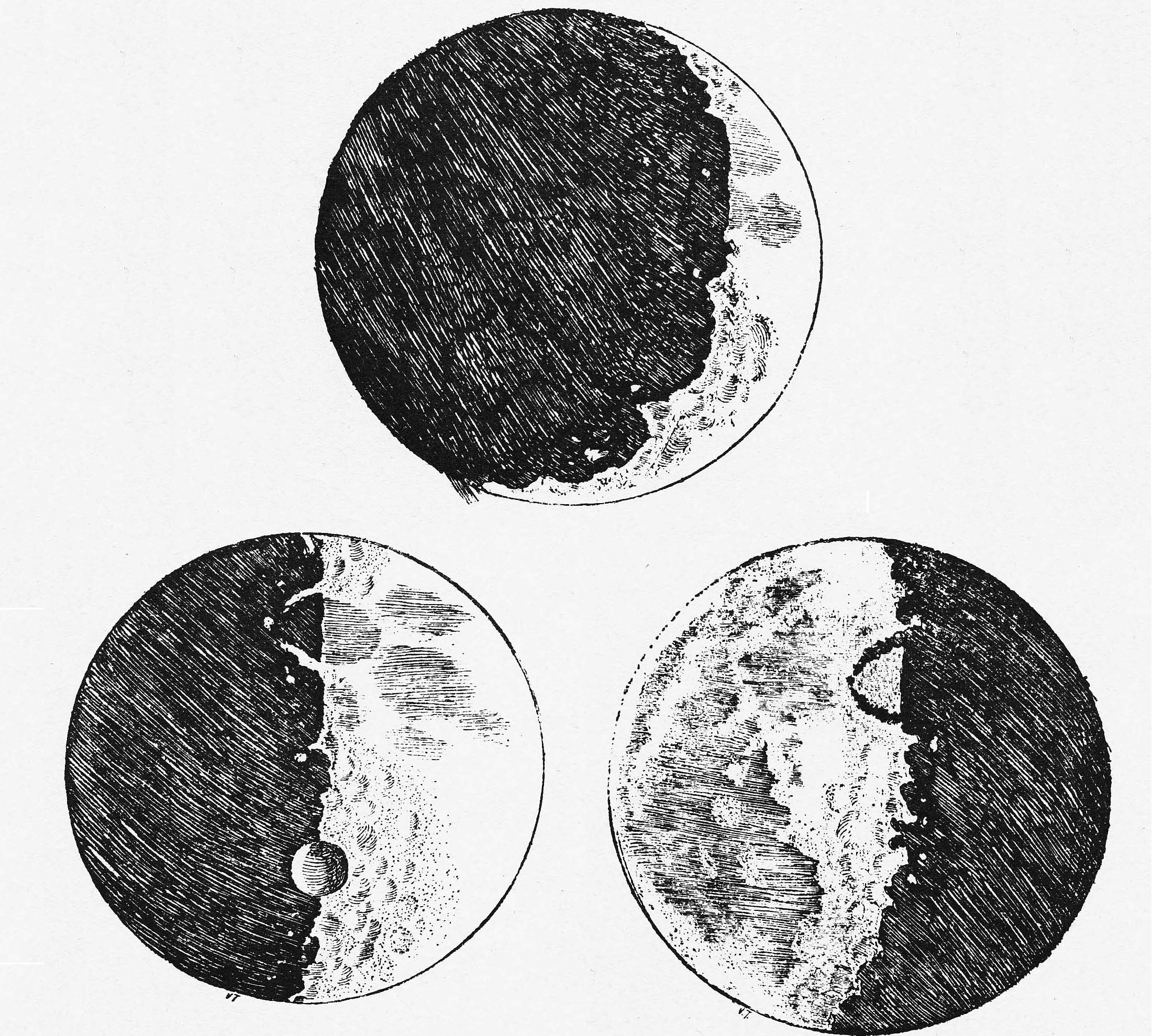
The first published sketches of one of the first telescopic observations of the Moon, from the paper Sidereus Nuncius (1610) by Galileo Galilei, providing among other findings the first descriptions of the Moon's topography

The telescope was developed and reported on in 1608. The first record of telescopic astronomy and rough mapping of the Moon's features is from early summer 1609 by Thomas Harriot, but which he did not publish. At the same time Galileo Galilei too started to use telescopes to observe the sky and the Moon, recording later that year more detailed observations and crucial conclusions, such as that the Moon was not smooth, featuring mountains and craters, which he published in 1610 in his ground-breaking and soon widely discussed book Sidereus Nuncius.

Later in the 17th century, the efforts of Giovanni Battista Riccioli and Francesco Maria Grimaldi led to the system of naming of lunar features in use today. The more exact 1834–1836 Mappa Selenographica of Wilhelm Beer and Johann Heinrich von Mädler, and their associated 1837 book Der Mond, the first trigonometrically accurate study of lunar features, included the heights of more than a thousand mountains, and introduced the study of the Moon at accuracies possible in earthly geography. Lunar craters, first noted by Galileo, were thought to be volcanic until the 1870s proposal of Richard Proctor that they were formed by collisions. This view gained support in 1892 from the experimentation of geologist Grove Karl Gilbert, and from comparative studies from 1920 to the 1940s, leading to the development of lunar stratigraphy, which by the 1950s was becoming a new and growing branch of astrogeology.

=== First missions to the Moon (1959–1976) ===
After World War II the first launch systems were developed and by the end of the 1950s they reached capabilities that allowed the Soviet Union and the United States to launch spacecraft into space. The Cold War fueled a closely followed development of launch systems by the two states, resulting in the so-called Space Race and its later phase the Moon Race, accelerating efforts and interest in exploration of the Moon.

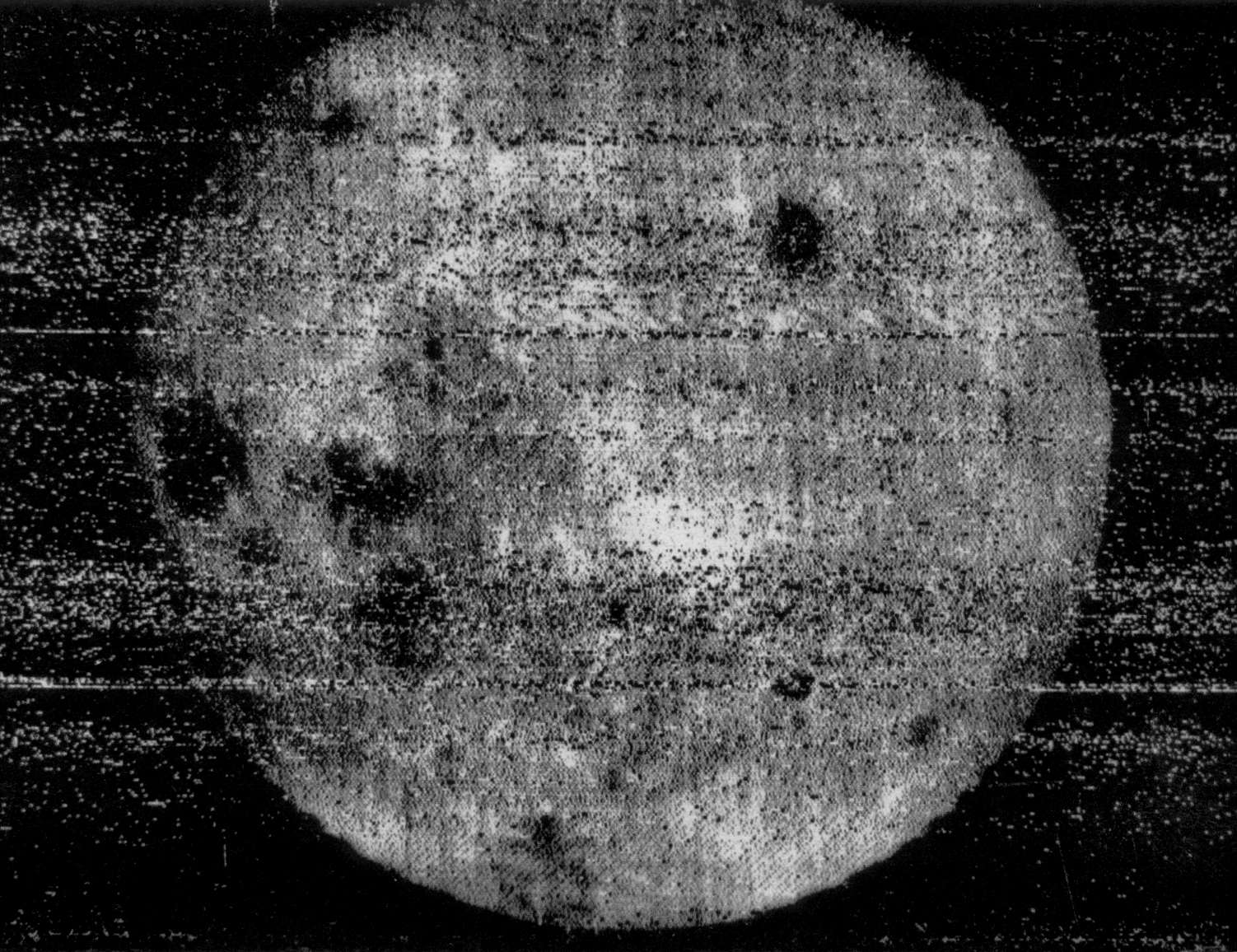
First view of the far side of the Moon, taken by Luna 3, October 7, 1959. Clearly visible is Mare Moscoviense (top right) and a mare triplet of Mare Crisium, Mare Marginis and Mare Smythii (left center).

After the first spaceflight of Sputnik 1 in 1957 during International Geophysical Year the spacecraft of the Soviet Union's Luna program were the first to accomplish a number of goals. Following three unnamed failed missions in 1958, the first human-made object Luna 1 escaped Earth's gravity and passed the Moon on 4 January 1959. Later that year the first human-made object Luna 2 reached the Moon's surface by intentionally impacting. By the end of the year Luna 3 reached as the first human-made object the normally occluded far side of the Moon, taking the first photographs of it. The first spacecraft to perform a successful lunar soft landing was Luna 9 and the first vehicle to orbit the Moon was Luna 10, both in 1966.

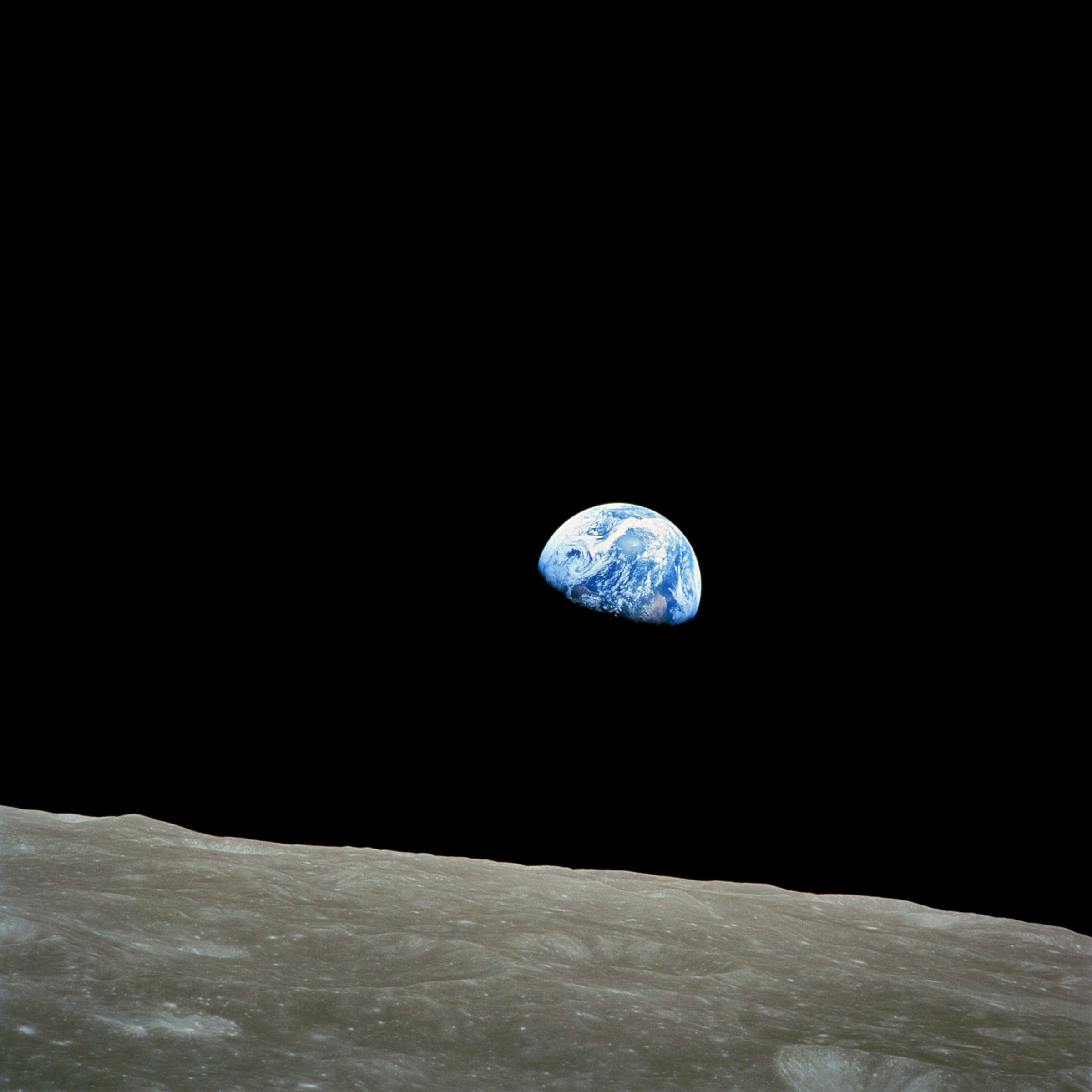
Earthrise, by NASA astronaut William Anders, the first color image of Earth taken by a human from the Moon, during Apollo 8 (1968), the first time a crewed spacecraft left Earth orbit and reached another astronomical body

Following President John F. Kennedy's 1961 commitment to a crewed Moon landing before the end of the decade, the United States, under NASA leadership, launched a series of uncrewed probes to develop an understanding of the lunar surface in preparation for human missions: the Jet Propulsion Laboratory's Ranger program, the Lunar Orbiter program and the Surveyor program. The crewed Apollo program was developed in parallel; after a series of uncrewed and crewed tests of the Apollo spacecraft in Earth orbit, and spurred on by a potential Soviet lunar human landing, in 1968 Apollo 8 made the first human mission to lunar orbit.The first Earthlings, two tortoises, had circled the Moon three months earlier on the Soviet Union's Zond 5, followed by turtles on Zond 6.

The first time a person landed on the Moon and any extraterrestrial body was when Neil Armstrong, the commander of the American mission Apollo 11, set foot on the Moon at 02:56 UTC on July 21, 1969. Considered the culmination of the Space Race, an estimated 500 million people worldwide watched the transmission by the Apollo TV camera, the largest television audience for a live broadcast at that time. While at the same time another mission, the robotic sample return mission Luna 15 by the Soviet Union had been in orbit around the Moon, becoming together with Apollo 11 the first ever case of two extraterrestrial missions being conducted at the same time.

The Apollo missions 11 to 17 (except Apollo 13, which aborted its planned lunar landing) removed 380.05 kilograms (837.87 lb) of lunar rock and soil in 2,196 separate samples. Scientific instrument packages were installed on the lunar surface during all the Apollo landings. Long-lived instrument stations, including heat flow probes, seismometers, and magnetometers, were installed at the Apollo 12, 14, 15, 16, and 17 landing sites. Direct transmission of data to Earth concluded in late 1977 because of budgetary considerations, but as the stations' lunar laser ranging corner-cube retroreflector arrays are passive instruments, they are still being used. Apollo 17 in 1972 was the last crewed mission to the Moon's orbit or surface, and the last to the Moon's vicinity until the Artemis II lunar flyby in 2026. Explorer 49 in 1973 was the last dedicated U.S. lunar probe until 1994.

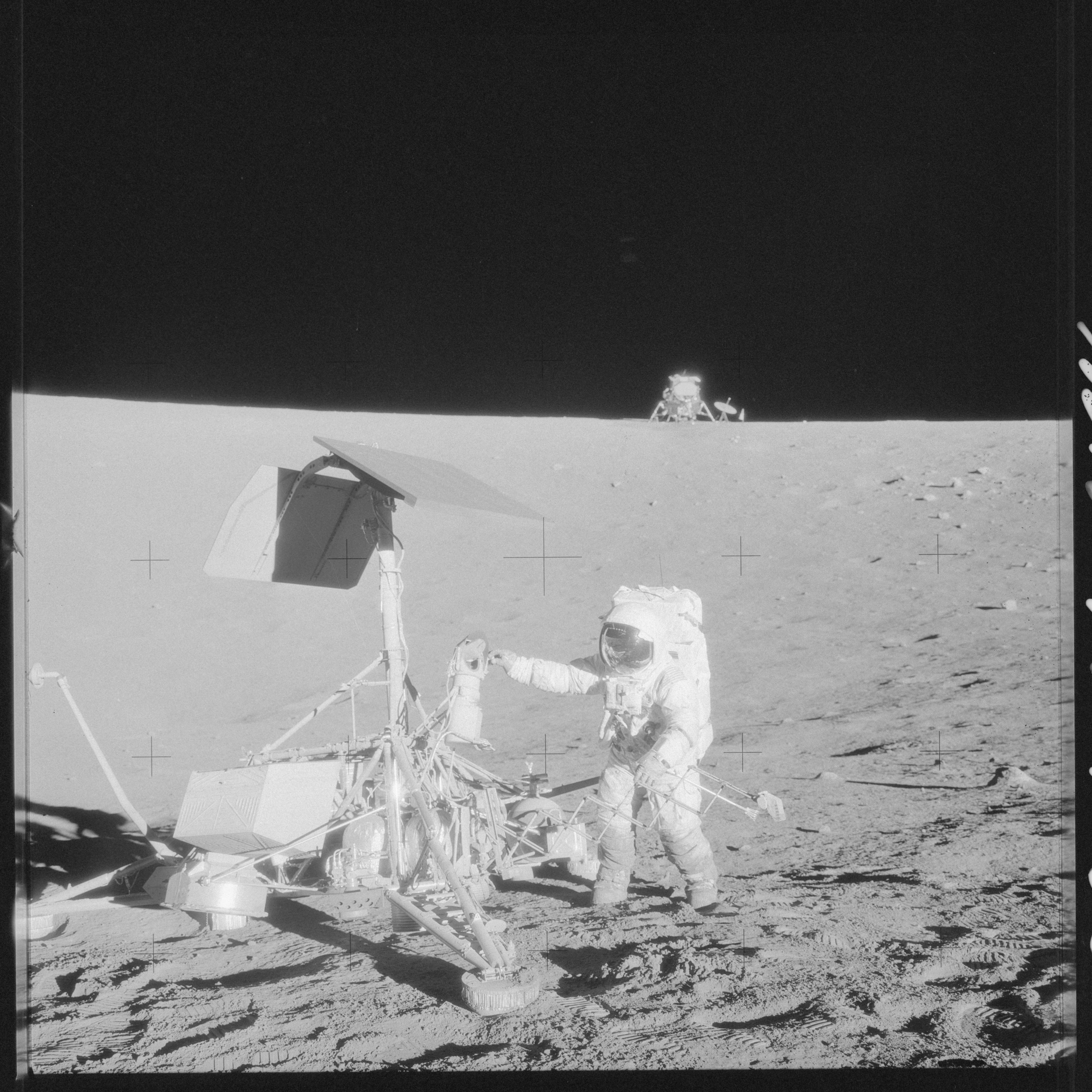
An example of the robotic and human exploration of the Moon in the first visit of a separate mission beyond Low Earth Orbit (1969), Apollo 12 astronaut Pete Conrad checking on Surveyor 3 at their shared lunar base, with the Apollo 12 Intrepid lander and S-band antenna in the distant background

The Soviet Union continued sending robotic missions to the Moon until 1976, deploying in 1970 with Luna 17 the first remote controlled rover Lunokhod 1 on an extraterrestrial surface, and collecting and returning 0.3 kg of rock and soil samples with three Luna sample return missions (Luna 16 in 1970, Luna 20 in 1972, and Luna 24 in 1976).

=== Moon Treaty and explorational absence (1976–1990) ===
Following the last Soviet mission to the Moon of 1976, there was little further lunar exploration for fourteen years. Astronautics had shifted its focus towards the exploration of the inner (e.g. Venera program) and outer (e.g. Pioneer 10, 1972) Solar System planets, but also towards Earth orbit, developing and continuously operating, beside communication satellites, Earth observation satellites (e.g. Landsat program, 1972), space telescopes and particularly space stations (e.g. Salyut program, 1971).

Negotiation in 1979 of the Moon Treaty, and its subsequent ratification in 1984, was the only major activity regarding the Moon until 1990.

=== Renewed exploration (1990–present) ===
In 1990 Hiten – Hagoromo, the first dedicated lunar mission since 1976, reached the Moon's orbit. Sent by Japan, it became the first lunar mission that was not a Soviet Union or U.S. mission.

In 1994, the U.S. dedicated a mission to fly a spacecraft (Clementine) to the Moon again for the first time since 1973. This mission obtained the first near-global topographic map of the Moon, and the first global multispectral images of the lunar surface. In 1998, this was followed by the Lunar Prospector mission, whose instruments indicated the presence of excess hydrogen at the lunar poles, which is likely to have been caused by the presence of water ice in the upper few meters of the regolith within permanently shadowed craters.

The next years saw a row of first missions to the Moon by a new group of states actively exploring the Moon. Between 2004 and 2006 the first spacecraft by the European Space Agency (ESA) (SMART-1) orbited the Moon, recording the first detailed survey of chemical elements on the lunar surface. The Chinese Lunar Exploration Program reached the Moon for the first time with the orbiter Chang'e 1 (2007–2009), obtaining a full image map of the Moon. India reached, orbited, and impacted the Moon in 2008 for the first time with its Chandrayaan-1 and Moon Impact Probe, becoming the fifth and sixth state to do so, creating a high-resolution chemical, mineralogical and photo-geological map of the lunar surface, and confirming the presence of water molecules in lunar soil.

The U.S. launched the Lunar Reconnaissance Orbiter (LRO) and the LCROSS impactor on June 18, 2009. LCROSS completed its mission by making a planned and widely observed impact in the crater Cabeus on October 9, 2009, whereas LRO is currently in operation, obtaining precise lunar altimetry and high-resolution imagery.

China continued its lunar program in 2010 with Chang'e 2, mapping the surface at a higher resolution over an eight-month period, and in 2013 with Chang'e 3, a lunar lander along with a lunar rover named Yutu (Chinese: 玉兔; lit. 'Jade Rabbit'). This was the first lunar rover mission since Lunokhod 2 in 1973 and the first lunar soft landing since Luna 24 in 1976, making China the third country to achieve this.

In 2014 the first privately funded probe, the Manfred Memorial Moon Mission, flew by the Moon. Another Chinese rover mission, Chang'e 4, achieved the first landing on the Moon's far side in early 2019. Also in 2019, India successfully sent its second probe, Chandrayaan-2, to the Moon. In 2020, China carried out its first robotic sample return mission (Chang'e 5), bringing back 1,731 grams of lunar material to Earth.

The U.S. developed plans for returning astronauts to the Moon beginning in 2004, and with the signing of the U.S.-led Artemis Accords in 2020, the Artemis program aims to return humans to the Moon in the 2020s. The Accords have been joined by a growing number of countries. The introduction of the Artemis Accords has fueled a renewed discussion about the international framework and cooperation of lunar activity, building on the Moon Treaty and the ESA-led Moon Village concept.

In 2022, South Korea launched Danuri successfully, its first lunar probe, from the US. In 2023 and 2024, India and Japan became the fourth and fifth country to soft land a spacecraft on the Moon, following the Soviet Union and United States in the 1960s, and China in 2013. Notably, Japan's spacecraft, the Smart Lander for Investigating Moon, survived three lunar nights. In February 2024, the IM-1 lander became the first commercially built lander to land on the Moon.

China launched Chang'e 6 in May 2024, which conducted the first sample return from the far side of the Moon. It also carried a Chinese rover to conduct infrared spectroscopy of lunar surface. Pakistan sent a lunar orbiter called ICUBE-Q along with Chang'e 6. Nova-C 2, iSpace Lander and Blue Ghost were all launched to the Moon in 2024.

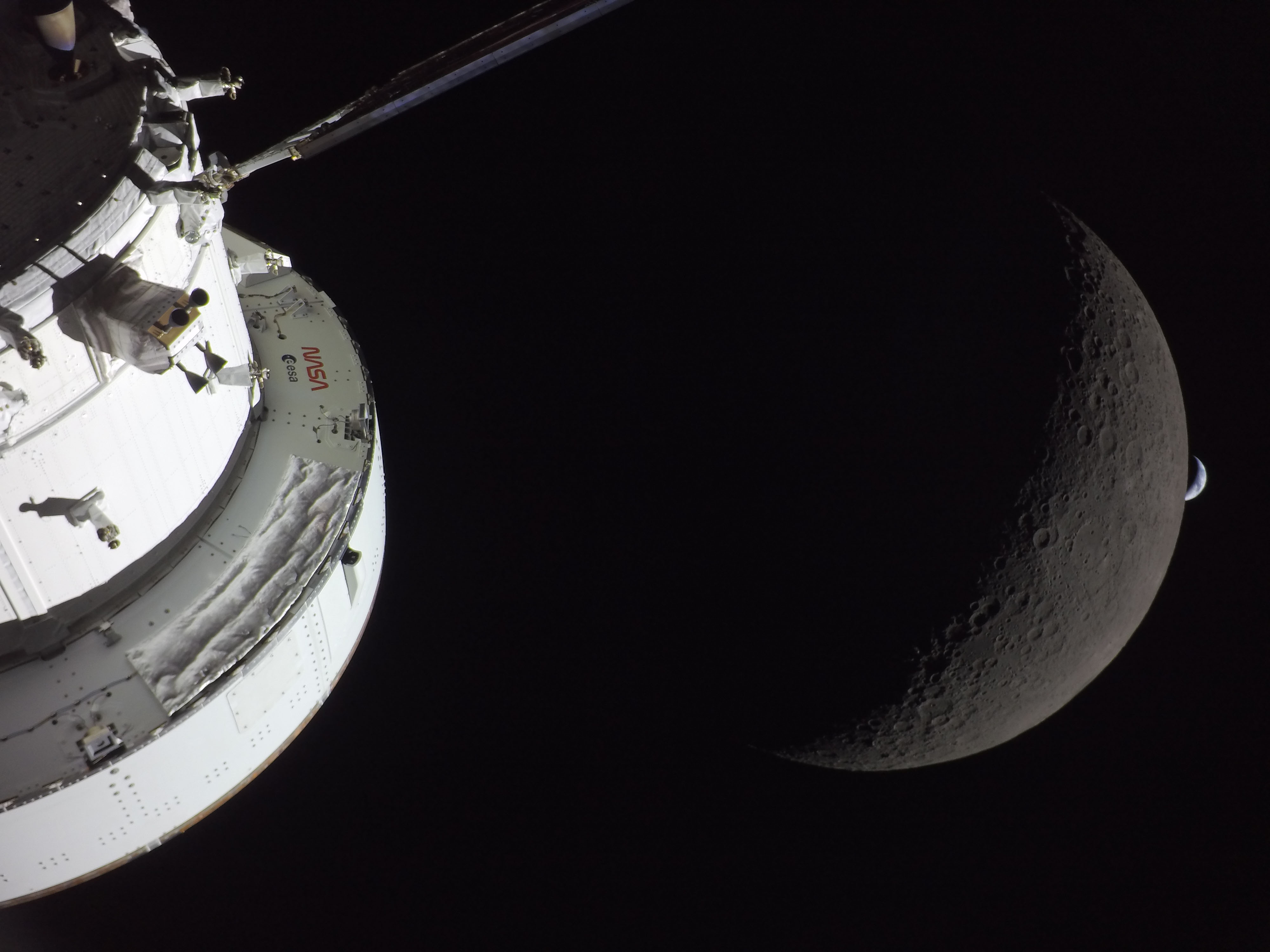
Photograph of the Moon, along with Earth during Earthset and the capsule Integrity, from cislunar space during the crewed Artemis II lunar flyby in 2026, the first crewed circumlunar flight since 1972

NASA's Artemis II crewed circumlunar flyby mission launched in April 2026. It was the first crewed mission beyond low Earth orbit since the Apollo era. Christina Koch became the only woman, Victor Glover the only person of color, Canadian Jeremy Hansen the only non-American, and commander Reid Wiseman the oldest person, to leave low Earth orbit and to travel to the vicinity of the Moon.

== Human interaction and presence ==
Map of all the sites of soft landings on the Moon (2024)

Human presence on the Moon began with remains of impactors, landings and lunar orbiters. Orbiters like the 2009-launched Lunar Reconnaissance Orbiter continue to surveil the Moon for future missions, while landers such as the 2013-launched Chang'e 3 with its Lunar Ultraviolet Telescope are still operational as of 2020. Five retroreflectors have been installed on the Moon since the 1970s and since used for accurate measurements of the physical librations through laser ranging to the Moon.

=== Human impact ===
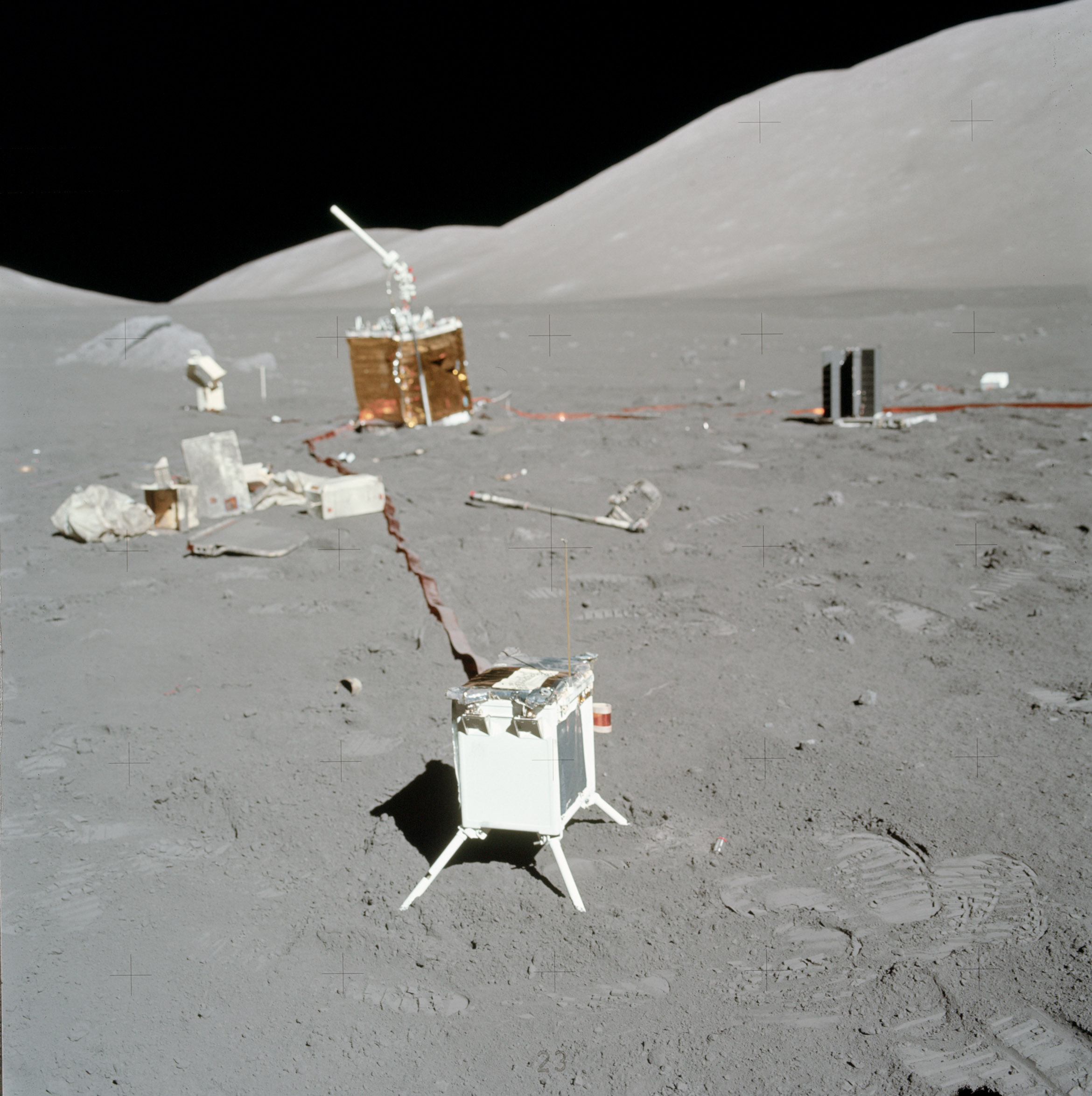
Artifacts of human activity, Apollo 17's Lunar Surface Experiments Package

While the Moon has the lowest planetary protection target-categorization, its degradation as a pristine body and scientific place has been discussed. If there is astronomy performed from the Moon, it will need to be free from any physical and radio pollution. While the Moon has no significant atmosphere, traffic and impacts on the Moon causes clouds of dust that can spread far and possibly contaminate the original state of the Moon and its special scientific content. Scholar Alice Gorman asserts that, although the Moon is inhospitable, describing the Moon as dead negates its dynamics, which requires sustainable human activity to treat the Moon's ecology as a co-participant.

The so-called "Tardigrade affair" of the 2019 crashed Beresheet lander and its carrying of tardigrades has been discussed as an example for lacking measures and lacking international regulation for planetary protection.

Space debris beyond Earth around the Moon has been considered as a future challenge with increasing numbers of missions to the Moon, particularly as a danger for such missions. As such lunar waste management has been raised as an issue which future lunar missions, particularly on the surface, need to tackle.

Human remains have been transported to the Moon, including by private companies such as Celestis and Elysium Space. Because the Moon has been sacred or significant to many cultures, the practice of space burials have attracted criticism from indigenous peoples leaders. For example, then–Navajo Nation president Albert Hale criticized NASA for sending the cremated ashes of scientist Eugene Shoemaker to the Moon in 1998.

Beside the remains of human activity on the Moon, there have been some intended permanent installations like the Moon Museum art piece, Apollo 11 goodwill messages, six lunar plaques, the Fallen Astronaut memorial, and other artifacts.

=== Astronomy from the Moon ===
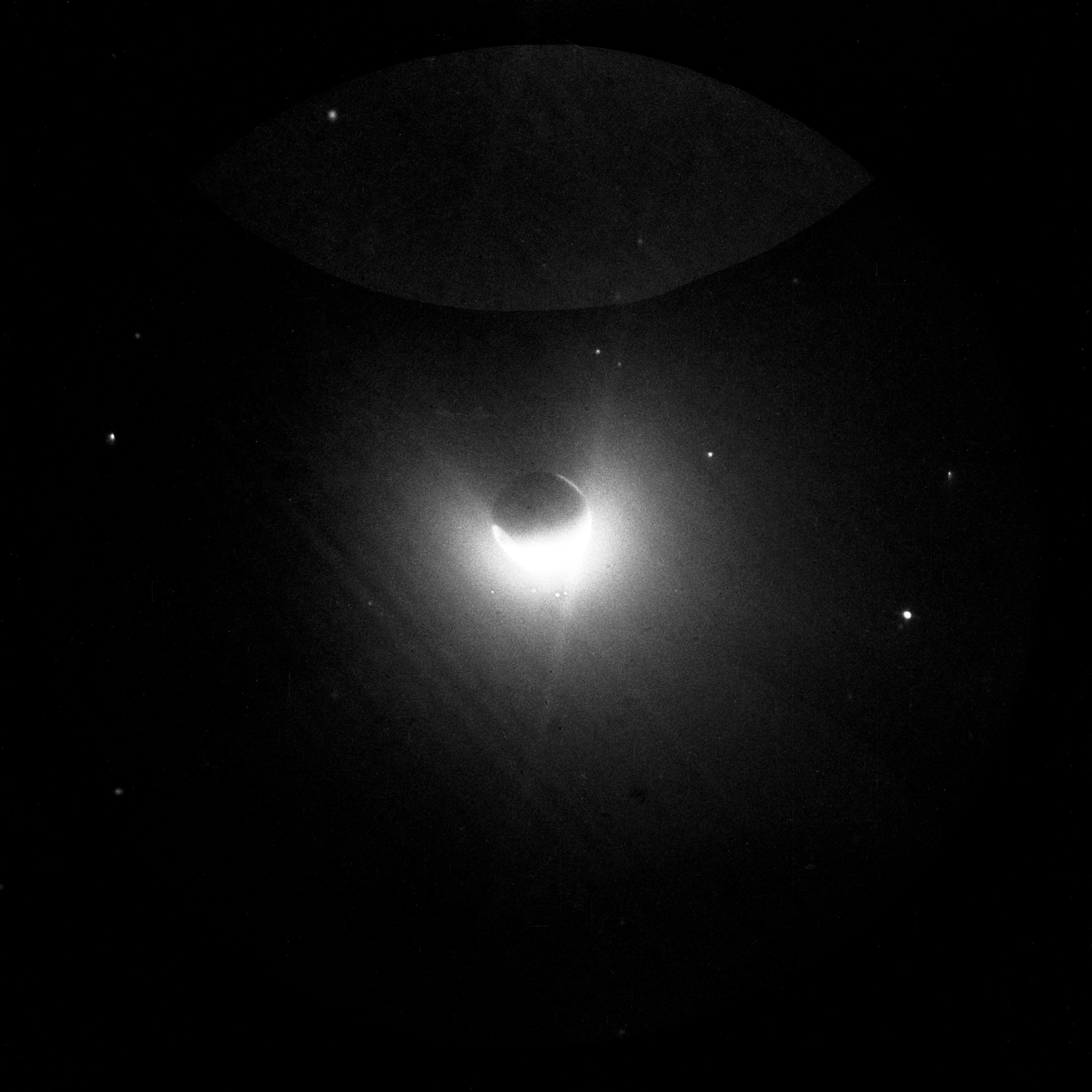
Earth's exosphere illuminated creating its geocorona, visible in ultraviolet and viewed by the Far Ultraviolet Camera/Spectrograph of Apollo 16 in 1972 from the Moon's surface

The Moon has been used as a site for astronomical and Earth observations. The Earth appears in the Moon's sky with an apparent size of 1° 48′ to 2°, three to four times the size of the Moon or Sun in Earth's sky, or about the apparent width of two little fingers at an arm's length away. Observations from the Moon started as early as 1966 with the first images of Earth from the Moon, taken by Lunar Orbiter 1. Of particular cultural significance is the 1968 photograph called Earthrise, taken by Bill Anders of Apollo 8 in 1968. In April 1972 the Apollo 16 mission set up the first dedicated telescope, the Far Ultraviolet Camera/Spectrograph, recording various astronomical photos and spectra.

The Moon is recognized as an excellent site for telescopes. It is relatively nearby; certain craters near the poles are permanently dark and cold and especially useful for infrared telescopes; and radio telescopes on the far side would be shielded from the radio chatter of Earth. The lunar soil, although it poses a problem for any moving parts of telescopes, can be mixed with carbon nanotubes and epoxies and employed in the construction of mirrors up to 50 meters in diameter. A lunar zenith telescope can be made cheaply with an ionic liquid.

With increased human activity on the surface of the Moon the atmospheric circulation of lunar dust will increase, reducing the favorable conditions for astronomy from the surface depending on measures to mitigate the spread of lunar dust.

=== Proposed missions ===
Both the U.S. and Chinese lunar programs have the goal to establish a lunar base in the 2030s with their international partners, being the first crewed lunar landings since Apollo 17 in 1972.

Following the Artemis III test flight in low Earth orbit scheduled for 2027, NASA plans to return humans to the lunar surface in 2028, with two Artemis IV astronauts landing on the lunar south pole. While the Apollo missions were explorational in nature, the Artemis program plans to establish a more permanent presence. To this end, the U.S. is partnering with industry for lunar communications, payload delivery, and in situ resource utilization through programs such as NASA's Commercial Lunar Payload Services, and DARPA lunar programs.

China's Chang'e program announced joint missions with Russia's Luna-Glob program. Two lunar survey missions are planned, Chang'e 7 in 2026 and Chang'e 8 in 2028, before a crewed landing in 2029 or 2030.

=== Legal status ===
Although Luna landers scattered pennants of the Soviet Union on the Moon, and U.S. flags were symbolically planted at their landing sites by the Apollo astronauts, no nation claims ownership of any part of the Moon's surface. Likewise no private ownership of parts of the Moon, or as a whole, is considered credible.

The 1967 Outer Space Treaty defines the Moon and all outer space as the "province of all mankind". It restricts the use of the Moon to peaceful purposes, explicitly banning military installations and weapons of mass destruction. A majority of countries are parties of this treaty. The 1979 Moon Treaty was created to elaborate, and restrict the exploitation of the Moon's resources by any single nation, leaving it to a yet unspecified international regulatory regime. As of January 2020, it has been signed and ratified by 18 nations.

Since 2020, countries have joined the U.S. in their Artemis Accords, which are challenging the treaty. The U.S. has furthermore emphasized in a presidential executive order ("Encouraging International Support for the Recovery and Use of Space Resources.") that "the United States does not view outer space as a 'global commons'" and calls the Moon Agreement "a failed attempt at constraining free enterprise".

With Australia signing and ratifying both the Moon Treaty in 1986 as well as the Artemis Accords in 2020, there has been a discussion if they can be harmonized. In this light an Implementation Agreement for the Moon Treaty has been advocated for, as a way to compensate for the shortcomings of the Moon Treaty and to harmonize it with other laws and agreements such as the Artemis Accords, allowing it to be more widely accepted.

In the face of such increasing commercial and national interest, particularly prospecting territories, U.S. lawmakers have introduced in late 2020 specific regulation for the conservation of historic landing sites and interest groups have argued for making such sites World Heritage Sites and zones of scientific value protected zones, all of which add to the legal availability and territorialization of the Moon.

In 2021, the Declaration of the Rights of the Moon was created by a group of "lawyers, space archaeologists and concerned citizens", drawing on precedents in the Rights of Nature movement and the concept of legal personality for non-human entities in space.

==== Coordination and regulation ====
Increasing human activity at the Moon has raised the need for coordination to safeguard international and commercial lunar activity. Issues from cooperation to mere coordination, through for example the development of a shared Lunar time, have been raised.

In particular the establishment of an international or United Nations regulatory regime for lunar human activity has been called for by the Moon Treaty and suggested through an Implementation Agreement, but remains contentious. Current lunar programs are multilateral, with the US-led Artemis program and the China-led International Lunar Research Station. For broader international cooperation and coordination, the International Lunar Exploration Working Group (ILEWG), the Moon Village Association (MVA) and more generally the International Space Exploration Coordination Group (ISECG) has been established.

== In culture and life ==
=== Mythology ===
Lunar deities are common across all human cultures. Many cultures have implicitly linked the 29.5-day lunar cycle to women's menstrual cycles, as evident in the shared linguistic roots of "menstruation" and "moon" words in multiple language families. This identification was not universal, as demonstrated by the fact that not all moon deities are female. Still, many well-known mythologies feature moon goddesses, including the Greek goddess Selene, the Roman goddess Luna, the Chinese goddess Chang'e, and the Aztec goddess Coyolxāuhqui, whose decapitation may represent a lunar eclipse. Some male gods like Nanna-Sin where linked to childbirth and pregnancy as well. Several goddesses including Artemis, Hecate, Melinoë, Phoebe, Theia and Isis did not originally have lunar aspects, and only acquired them late in antiquity due to syncretism with the de facto Greco-Roman lunar deity Selene/Luna.

The splitting of the Moon into two halves in the sky is a miracle attributed to the prophet Mohammad.

=== Timekeeping ===
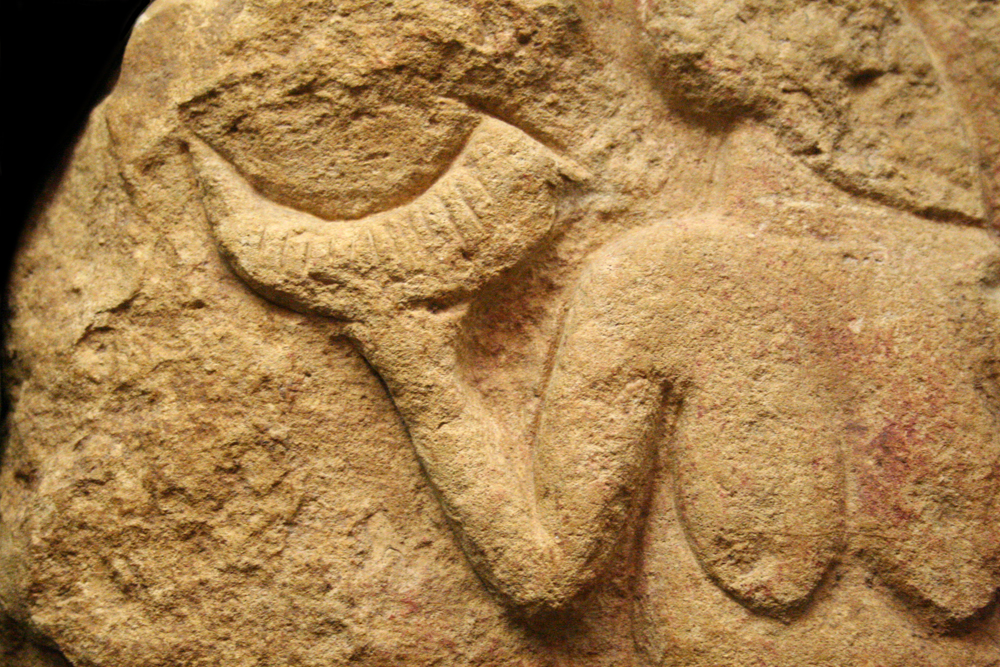
The Venus of Laussel (c. 25,000 BP) holding a crescent shaped horn. The 13 notches on the horn may symbolize the average number of days from menstruation to an ovulation, or the approximate number of full menstrual cycles and lunar cycles per year (although these two phenomena are unrelated).

Since prehistoric times people have taken note of the Moon's phases and its waxing and waning cycle and used it to keep record of time. The words for the month in a range of different languages carry this relation between the period of the month and the Moon etymologically. This lunar timekeeping gave rise to the historically dominant, but varied, lunisolar calendars. The 7th-century Islamic calendar is an example of a purely lunar calendar, where months are traditionally determined by the visual sighting of the hilal, or earliest crescent moon, over the horizon.

Of particular significance has been the occasion of full moon, highlighted and celebrated in a range of calendars and cultures, an example being the Buddhist Vesak. The full moon around the southern or northern autumnal equinox is often called the harvest moon and is celebrated with festivities such as the Harvest Moon Festival of the Chinese lunar calendar, its second most important celebration after the Chinese lunisolar Lunar New Year.

=== Cultural representation ===
Recurring lunar aspects of lunar deities

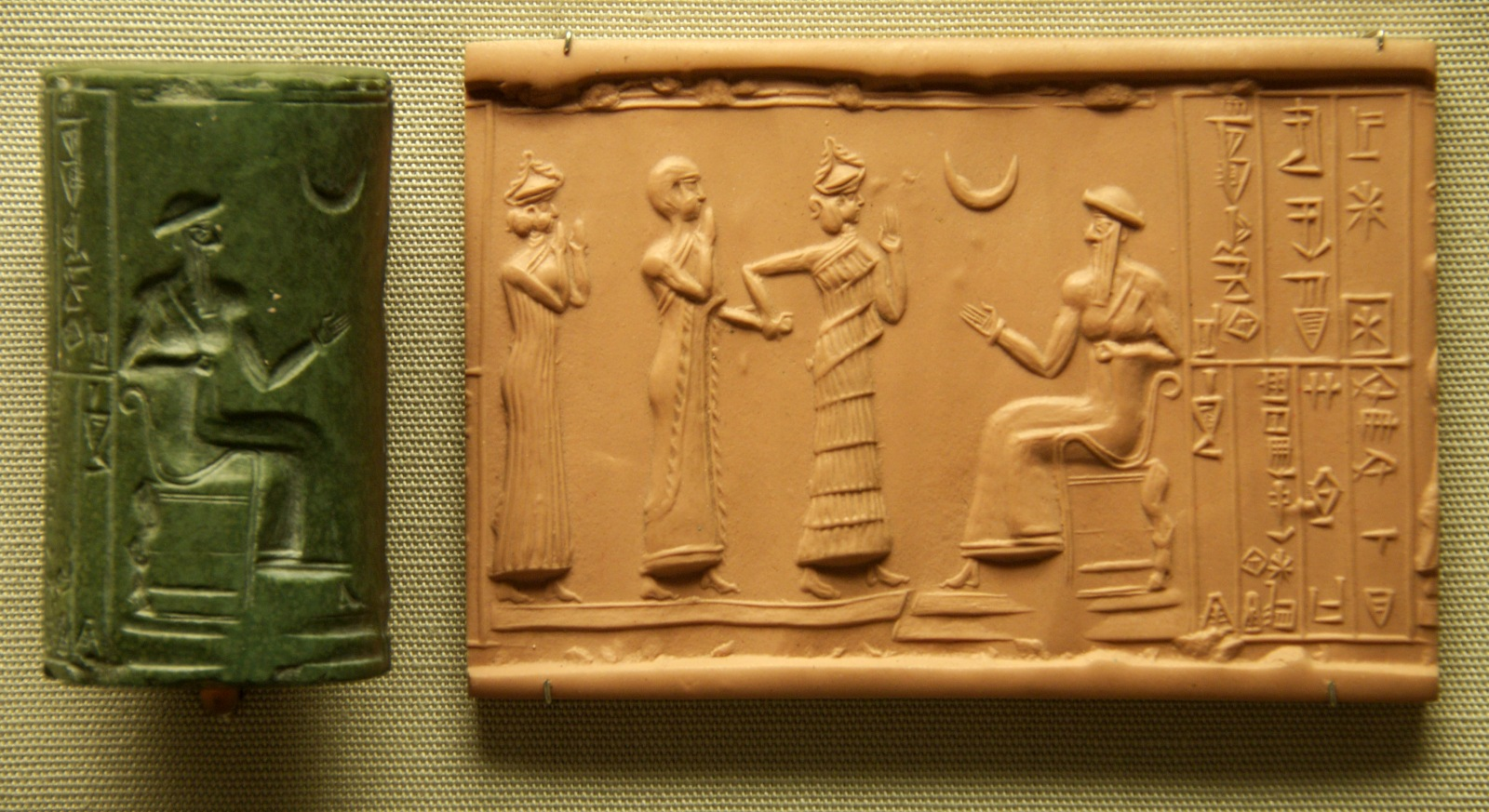
The crescent of Nanna/Sîn, c. 2100 BC

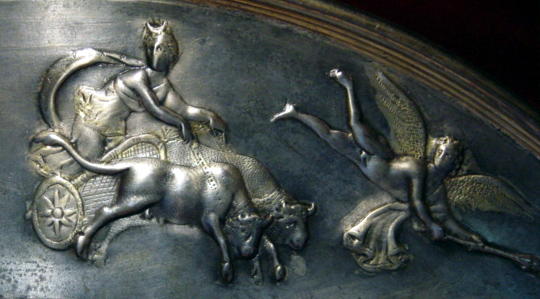
Crescent headgear, chariot and velificatio of Luna, 2nd–5th century

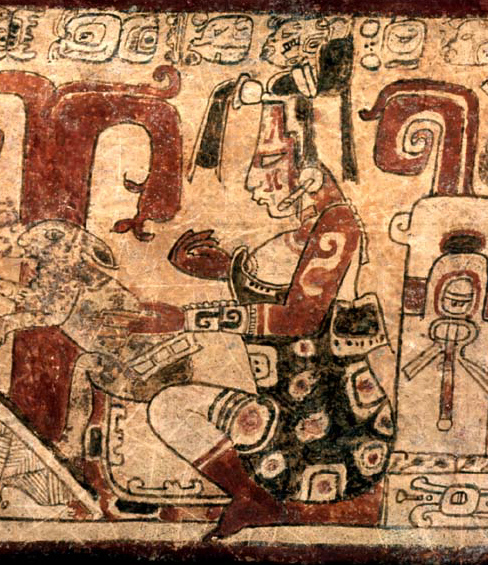
A Moon rabbit of the Maya moon goddess, 6th–9th century

Humans have depicted the Moon since prehistoric times, as evidenced by visual depictions from 40,000 BP and written depictions from the 4th millennium BCE. The oldest named astronomer and poet Enheduanna, Akkadian high priestess to the lunar deity Nanna/Sin and daughter of Sargon the Great (c. 2334 – c. 2279 BCE), tracked the Moon and wrote poems about her.

==== Crescent ====
For the representation of the Moon, especially its lunar phases, the crescent (🌙) has been a recurring symbol in a range of cultures since at least 3,000 BCE or possibly earlier with bull horns dating to the earliest cave paintings at 40,000 BP. In writing systems such as Chinese the crescent has developed into the symbol 月, the word for Moon, and in ancient Egyptian it was the symbol 𓇹, meaning Moon and spelled like the ancient Egyptian lunar deity Iah, which the other ancient Egyptian lunar deities Khonsu and Thoth were associated with.

Iconographically the crescent was used in Mesopotamia as the primary symbol of Nanna/Sîn, the ancient Sumerian lunar deity, who was the father of Inanna/Ishtar, the goddess of the planet Venus (symbolized as the eight pointed Star of Ishtar), and Utu/Shamash, the god of the Sun (symbolized as a disc, optionally with eight rays), all three often depicted next to each other. Nanna/Sîn is, like some other lunar deities, for example Iah and Khonsu of ancient Egypt, Mene/Selene of ancient Greece and Luna of ancient Rome, depicted as a horned deity, featuring crescent shaped headgears or crowns.

The particular arrangement of the crescent with a star known as the star and crescent (☪️) goes back to the Bronze Age, representing either the Sun and Moon, or the Moon and the planet Venus, in combination. Since then the heraldric use of the star and crescent proliferated, Byzantium's symbolism possibly influencing the development of the Ottoman flag, specifically the combination of the Turkish crescent with a star, and becoming a popular symbol for Islam (as the hilal of the Islamic calendar) and for a range of nations.

==== Other associations ====
The features of the Moon, the contrasting brighter highlands and darker maria, have been seen by different cultures forming abstract shapes. Such shapes are among others the Man in the Moon (e.g. Coyolxāuhqui) or the Moon Rabbit (e.g. the Chinese Tu'er Ye or in Indigenous American mythologies the aspect of the Maya moon goddess, from which possibly Awilix is derived, or of Metztli/Tēcciztēcatl).

Throughout the global Middle Ages, the Moon held an important cultural role in topics as wide-ranging as love poetry, prophecy, medical thinking. In western alchemy, the Moon was associated with silver, while gold was associated with the Sun.

=== Representation in modern culture ===
The Moon is prominently featured in Vincent van Gogh's 1889 painting The Starry Night.

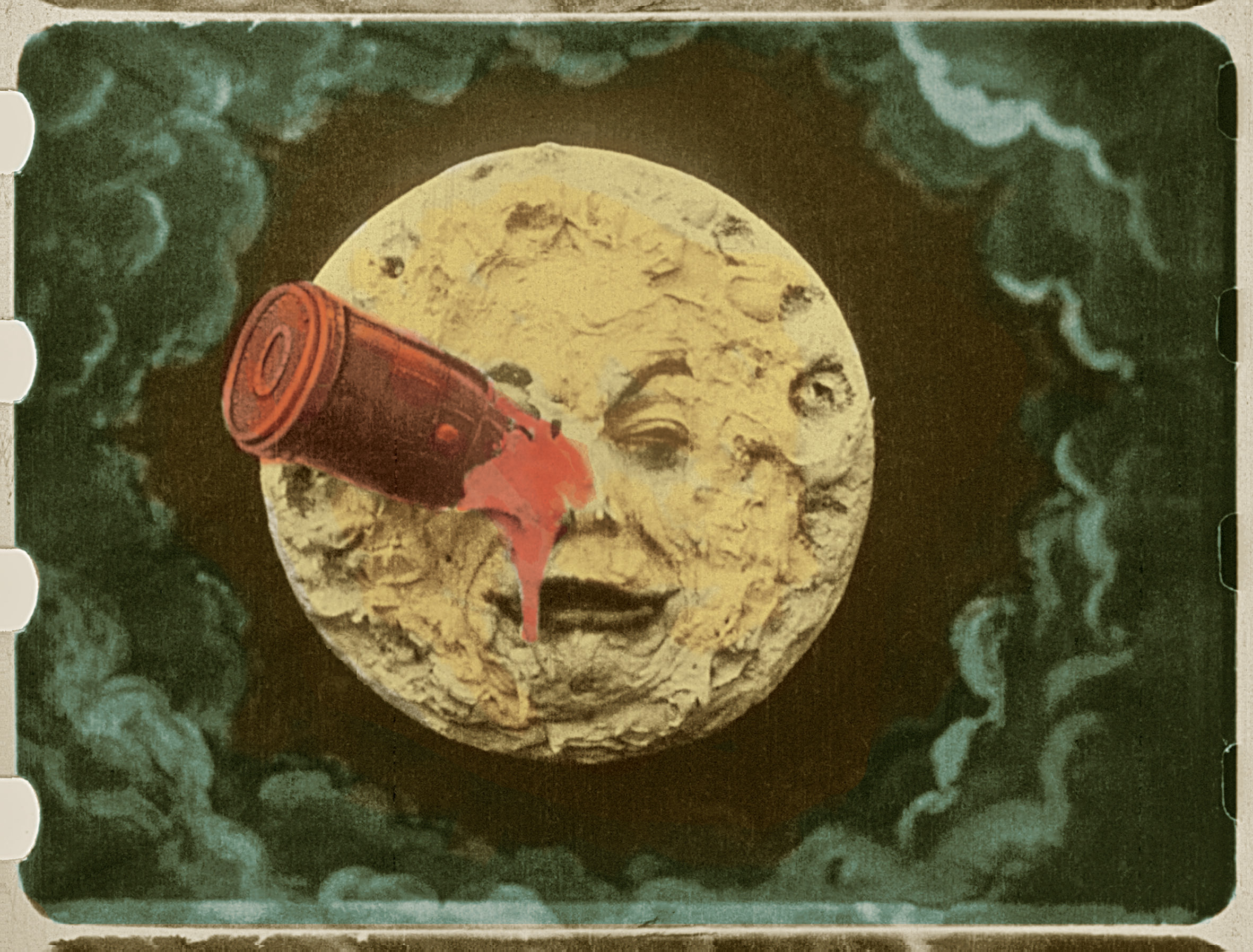
An iconic image of the Man in the Moon from the first science-fiction film set in space, A Trip to the Moon (1902, Georges Méliès), inspired by a history of literature about going to the Moon.

The perception of the Moon in the modern era has been informed by telescope-enabled modern astronomy. These new insights inspired cultural references, connecting romantic reflections about the Moon and speculative fiction such as science-fiction dealing with the Moon.

Later spaceflight ushered in the space age, which produced especially with the first Moon landings historic achievements and references for global society, represented through images of Earth from a distance and summarized in an awe and awareness called the overview effect, amounting to Moon joy by reaching the Moon.

Video of the first step on the surface of the Moon, performed by Neil Armstrong and commented with "That's one small step for [a] man, one giant leap for mankind.", which was broadcast live, internationally (1969, Apollo 11).

The much reproduced image of Buzz Aldrin (Apollo 11), with Neil Armstrong and Earth reflected in his visor.

This has been accompanied by public and critical reflection on humanity's cultural and legal relation to the celestial body, particularly as an object of imperialism, as in the space race, and as an object of colonialism through lunar resources commercialization. The 1970 poem "Whitey on the Moon" has become famous for its expression of such critical reflections. Other reflections have invoked the Moon's nature, raising issues like lunar conservation and sustainability, understanding the Moon as a common.

In 2021 the 20 July became the International Moon Day, the date of the first crewed Moon landing.

=== Lunar effect ===
The lunar effect is a supposed correlation between specific stages of the roughly 29.5-day lunar cycle, and behavior and physiological changes in humans on Earth. Lunar cycles have significant impacts on human culture, but no solid evidence connects these cycles to human biology.

The Moon has long been associated with insanity and irrationality; the words lunacy and lunatic are derived from the Latin name for the Moon, Luna. Philosophers Aristotle and Pliny the Elder argued that the full moon induced insanity in susceptible individuals, believing that the brain, which is mostly water, must be affected by the Moon and its power over the tides, but the Moon's gravity is too slight to affect any single person. In modern society lunar effects have been claimed to be responsible for supposed increased admissions to psychiatric hospitals, traffic accidents, homicides or suicides during a full moon, but these claims have been invalidated by at least 37 studies.

== See also ==
- List of natural satellites
- Selenography – Study of the surface and shape of the Moon
- Timekeeping on the Moon
