= Ferroan anorthosite =

Ferroan anorthosite (FAN) is a pristine coarse-grained igneous rock found in the lunar highlands. FANs have a Ca-rich plagioclase (called anorthite) composition greater than 90 wt%, with many consisting of an anorthite-content of 99 wt%. The first hand sample of FAN, Sample 15415, was discovered at the Apollo 15 landing site, Hadley-Apennine. FANs were also found at the Apollo 16 landing site, the Descartes Highlands. FANs have been used to give insights into the evolution of the early lunar crust. Wood et al. 1970 first proposed that FANs were the result of the flotation of plagioclase crystals in a lunar magma ocean (LMO). However, Wetherill 1975 suggested that FANs formed due to serial magmatism.

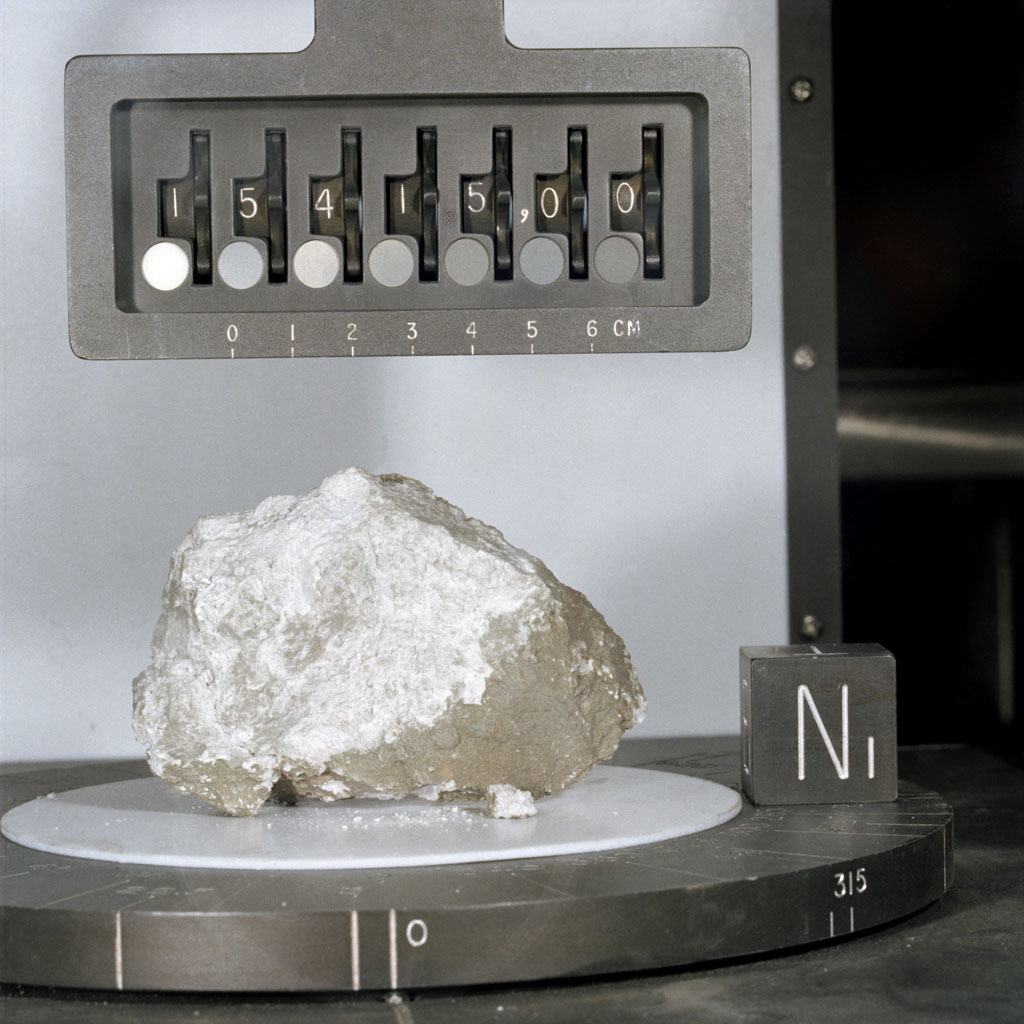
Sample 15415: The Genesis Rock.

Apollo 15 astronauts, Dave Scott and Jim Irwin, find the first ferroan anorthosite hand sample, 15415.

== Petrology ==
FANs are called such because "ferroan" is attributed to the Fe-rich, Na-poor mineral contents found in these rocks, while "anorthosite" is in relation to the high content of anorthite. In addition to anorthite, FANs also contain high- and low-Ca pyroxene, and traces of olivine, ilmenite, and ulvöspinel.

FANs Mineralogical Mode
(vol%)	15415	60015	67075
Plagioclase	99	98.5	99
Pyroxene	1	1.5	1
Olivine	tr.	tr.	tr.
Ilmenite	tr.	tr.	tr.
Spinel	tr.	tr.	tr.

FANs were initially rocks with only coarse-grain size crystals, but most samples have been severely shocked from eons of meteoroid impacts into the lunar surface. Therefore, many FANs are brecciated clasts and do not represent their primary condition. However some samples still have their original texture, like Sample 60025.

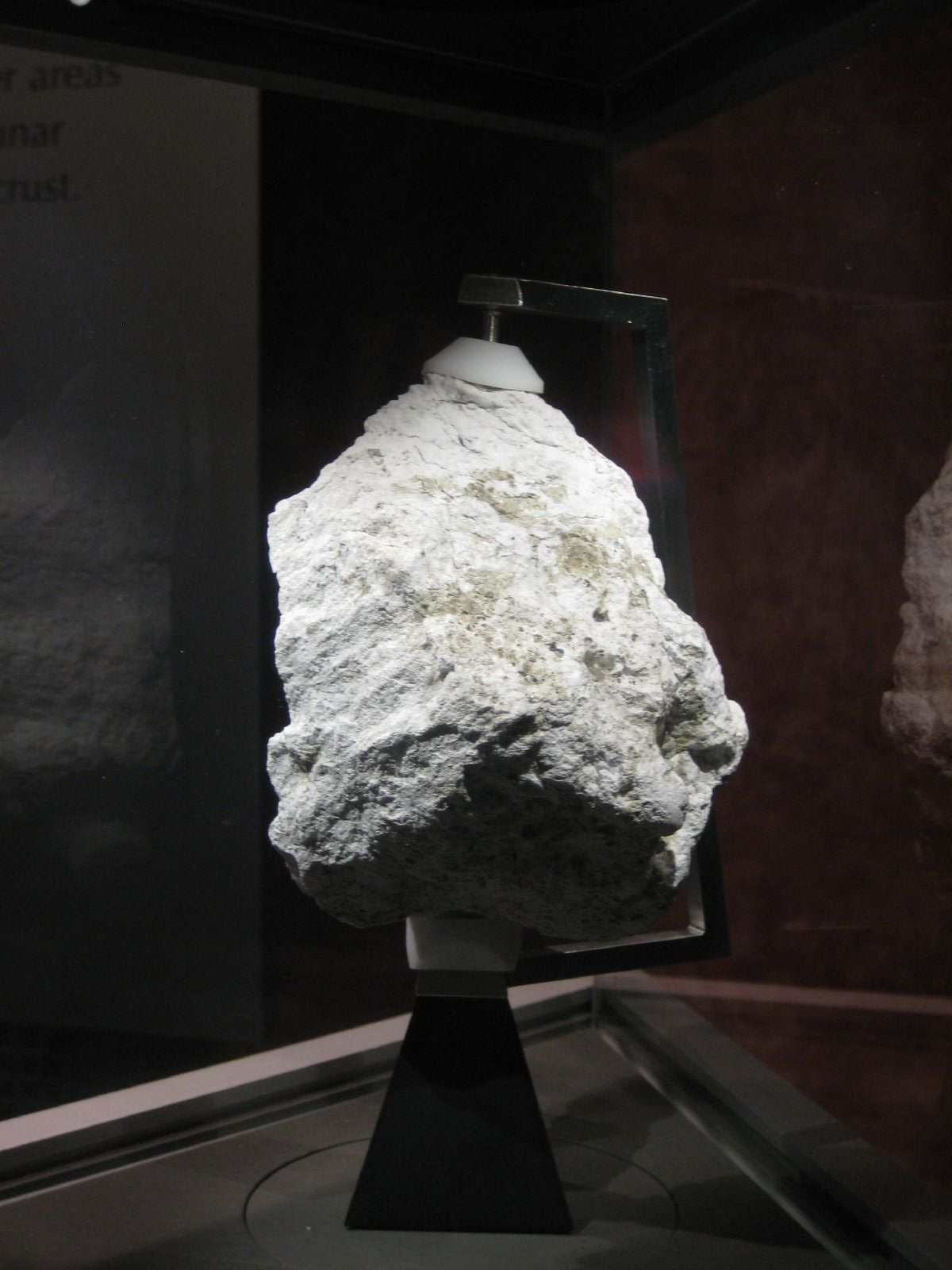
Sample 60025

FAN ages range from 4.562 Gya to 4.294 Gya. However, some FANs have conflicting age data. Carlson and Lugmair 1988 initially reported an age of 4.44 Gya for Sample 60025, but Borg et al. 2011 determined an age of 4.36 Gya.

== Origins ==
The initial coarse-grain size of FANs is due to them being plutonic, crystallizing beneath the surface, and their ages suggest FANs were the first rocks to crystallize during the formation of the Moon. This has led to two main competing hypotheses for FAN origin: an LMO or serial magmatism. In the LMO model, FANs would have crystallized beneath the surface after 70% of the Moon had crystallized from its initial molten state. Since FANs are mostly anorthite and less dense than the more Fe- and Mg-rich magma ocean, the FANs would have floated to the lunar surface and formed the lunar crust. The LMO hypothesis infers that the lunar crust should be homogenous and only consist of FANs, but there are other highland rock types (i.e., Mg-suite and Calc-Alkali suite) that are not explained by this model.

In the serial magmatism model, FANs were just one of multiple rock types that would have crystallized beneath the surface of a molten Moon, and then each suite of rocks would have floated separately to the surface to form the lunar crust. While the serial magmatism model helps explain the heterogeneity of the lunar crust, it does not explain the suite of potassium, rare earth elements, and phosphorus (KREEP) rocks.

Even though the exact origin of FANs is still debated, FANs have provided key insight into the chronology and evolution of the early lunar crust.
