= Mangerite =

Plutonic intrusive igneous rock, that is essentially a hypersthene-bearing monzonite

Mangerite is a plutonic intrusive igneous rock, that is essentially a hypersthene-bearing monzonite. It often occurs in association with norite, anorthosite, charnockite and rapakivi granite in Proterozoic metamorphic belts. It is characterised by the presence of mesoperthite. It was named for Manger, Norway, by Carl Fredrik Kolderup in 1903.
