= Serial magmatism =

Serial magmatism is a model that requires basaltic magma to erupt and intrude repeatedly into a pre-existing crust. Regarding the Moon, the magma would have been partially melted in the lunar mantle due to heat produced by initial accretion, radioactive elements, and mantle overturn. As the intruded magma cools it differentiates by density, causing heavier materials (i.e., mafic minerals) to sink down into the lunar mantle, and lighter materials (i.e., plagioclase) to rise to the crust. As each of the materials separate, they create diapirs which then sink or float to their respective positions. As each diapir solidifies, it would constitute that they would all have their own ages and geochemical signature that may allude to when each intrusion formed. This process would cover a primary lunar crust, and leave us with a complex crust where diapirs overlap and may be difficult to unravel.

== Terrestrial examples ==
This model has proven to be true for some terrestrial formations, such as the Stillwater complex in Montana, USA and the Nain complex in Labrador, Canada, which has been used as a basis for the lunar serial magmatism model. Plagioclase and mafic mineral compositions in rocks from the Stillwater complex follow similar trends to Apollo samples, although varying An compositions in the plagioclase. Using the Nain complex, which hosts the largest massif anorthosite formation, has aided in understanding the processes that are needed to produce the lunar crust we see today. Lunar anorthositic crust could be made up of multiple “massif-like” bodies, rather than the crust crystallizing from a lunar magma ocean.

== Other possible theories ==
The lunar magma ocean (LMO) theory is one of the most widely accepted theories in regards to the origin and evolution of the lunar crust. However, this theory only fits with samples from the nearside of the Moon that are from the Imbrium Basin, or have been affected by ejecta from the Imbrium Basin. These areas are where a majority of the returned Apollo samples came from, and do not truly represent the Moon as a whole. A lunar magma ocean should not be completely invalidated, as it may be necessary for the initial consolidation and formation of the Moon after the giant impact hypothesis. However, it does not explain the evolution of the lunar crust that we see today, and so a more complicated formation process of the lunar crust, such as serial magmatism, should be considered.

== Evidence against LMO theory ==
Lunar meteorites play a critical role in constraining the formation and evolution of the lunar surface, as they are random samples from both the far and nearside of the Moon. Additionally, when all lunar meteorites that are cataloged are considered, the proportion of feldspathic to basaltic lunar meteorites is similar to the proportion of the lunar highlands to the lunar mare areas. Studies conducted using feldspathic meteorites show that they do not contain ferroan anorthosites, KREEP components, or Mg-suite rocks, which further supports that the LMO theory was not global and that the lunar crust is heterogeneous. Outside of the Imbrium basin and its ejecta, and from lunar meteorites, it appears that the highland crust is dominated by magnesian anorthosites. Therefore, a LMO does not explain the abundance of magnesian anorthosites, or the lack of ferroan anorthosites, KREEP components, and Mg-suite rocks in lunar meteorites.
