= Geology of the Moon =

Structure and composition of the Moon

Geologic map of the Moon, with general features colored in by age, except in the case of maria (in blue), KREEP (red) and other special features. Oldest to youngest: Aitkenian (pink), Nectarian (brown), Imbrian (greens/turquoise), Eratosthenian (light orange) and Copernican (yellow).

The geology of the Moon (sometimes called selenology, although the latter term can refer more generally to "lunar science") is the structure and composition of the Moon, which is quite different from that of Earth. The Moon lacks a true atmosphere outside of a sparse layer of gas. Because of this, the relative absence of an atmosphere and water eliminates erosion due to weather. Instead, the surface is eroded much more slowly through the bombardment of the lunar surface by micrometeorites. It does not have any known form of plate tectonics, along with having a lower gravity compared to Earth. Because of its small size, it cooled faster in the early days of its formation. In addition to impacts, the geomorphology of the lunar surface has been shaped by volcanism, which is now thought to have ended less than 50 million years ago. The Moon is a differentiated body, with a crust, mantle, and core.

Smithsonian Institution Senior Scientist Tom Watters talks about the Moon's recent geological activity.

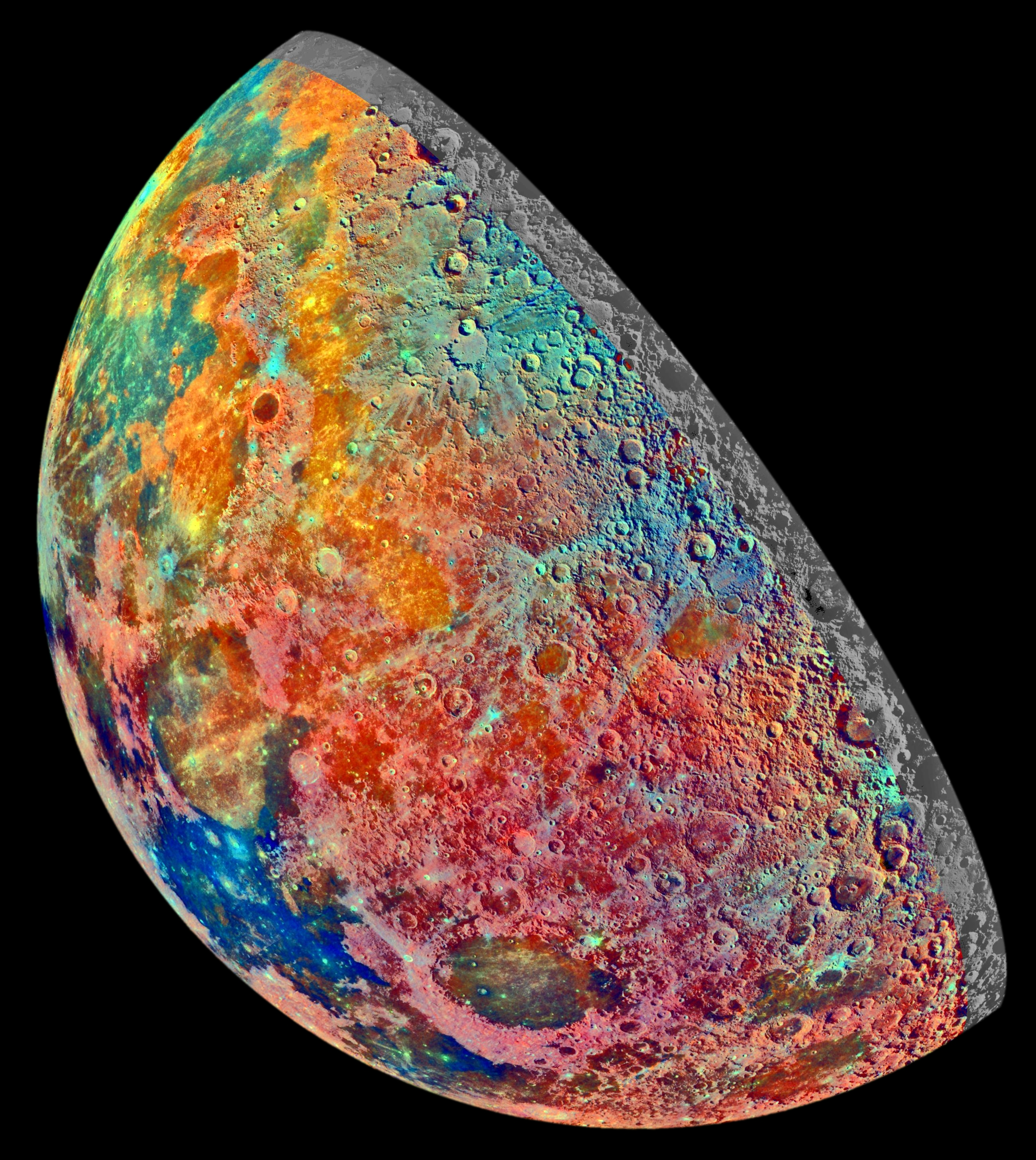
False-color image of the Moon taken by the Galileo orbiter showing geological features. NASA photo

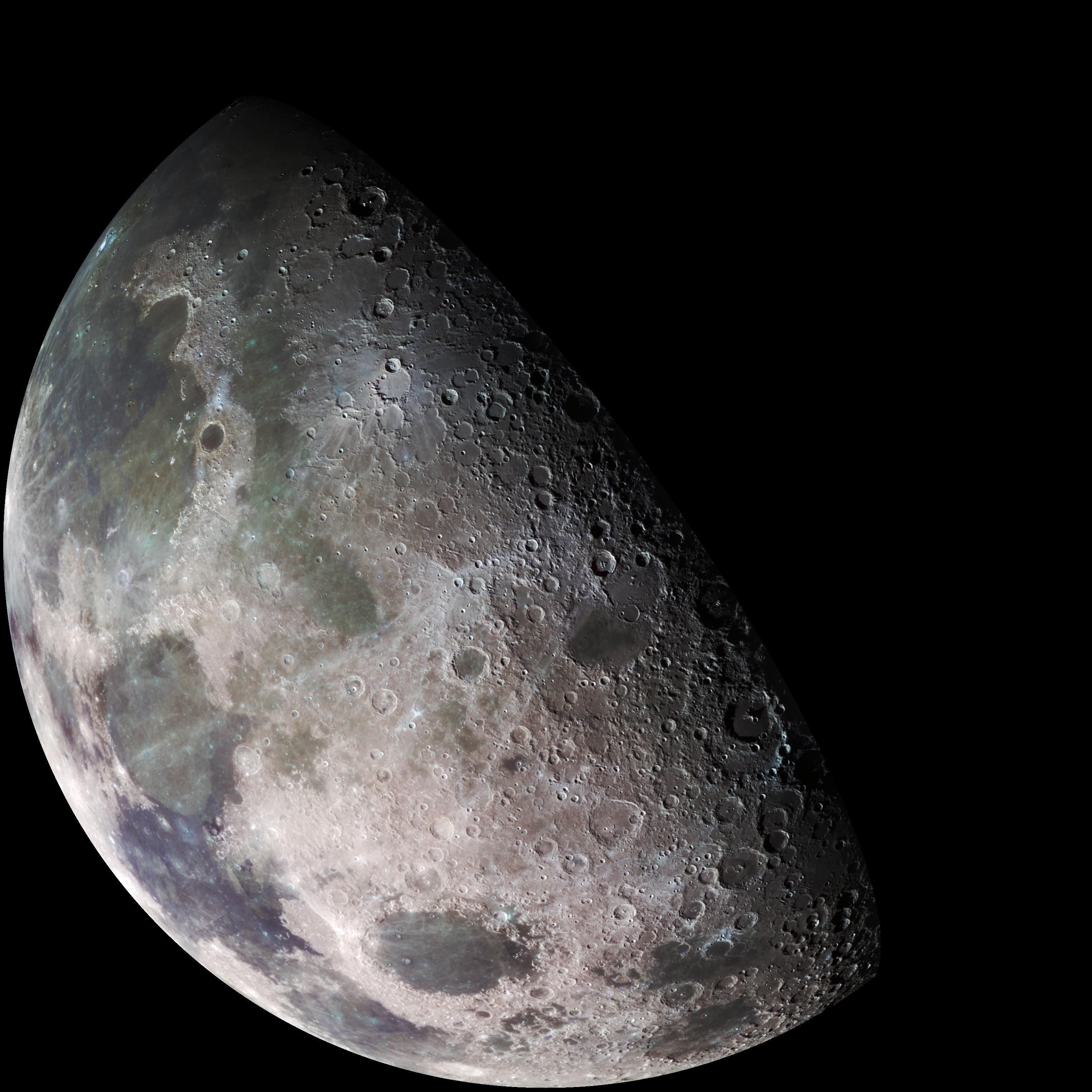
The same image in true color.

Geological studies of the Moon are based on a combination of Earth-based telescope observations, measurements from orbiting spacecraft, lunar samples, and geophysical data. Six locations were sampled directly during the crewed Apollo program landings from 1969 to 1972, which returned 382 kilograms (842 lb) of lunar rock and lunar soil to Earth. In addition, three robotic Soviet Luna spacecraft returned another 301 grams (10.6 oz) of samples, and the Chinese robotic Chang'e 5 returned a sample of 1,731 g (61.1 oz) in 2020.

The Moon is the only extraterrestrial body for which we have samples with a known geologic context. A handful of lunar meteorites have been recognized on Earth, though their source craters on the Moon are unknown. A substantial portion of the lunar surface has not been explored, and a number of geological questions remain unanswered.

== Elemental composition ==
Elements known to be present on the lunar surface include, among others, oxygen (O), silicon (Si), iron (Fe), magnesium (Mg), calcium (Ca), aluminium (Al), manganese (Mn) and titanium (Ti). Among the more abundant are oxygen, iron, and silicon. The oxygen content is estimated at 45% (by weight). Carbon (C) and nitrogen (N) appear to be present only in trace quantities from deposition by solar wind.

Lunar surface chemical composition
Compound		Composition	
Name	Formula	Maria	Highlands
silica	SiO_{2}	45.4%	45.5%
alumina	Al_{2}O_{3}	14.9%	24.0%
lime	CaO	11.8%	15.9%
iron(II) oxide	FeO	14.1%	5.9%
magnesia	MgO	9.2%	7.5%
titanium dioxide	TiO_{2}	3.9%	0.6%
sodium oxide	Na_{2}O	0.6%	0.6%
Total (with rounding error)		99.9%	100.0%

Neutron spectrometry data from Lunar Prospector indicate the presence of hydrogen (H) concentrated at the poles.

Relative concentration of various elements on the lunar surface (in weight %)

Relative concentration (in weight %) of various elements on lunar highlands, lunar lowlands, and Earth

== Formation ==
For a long period of time, the fundamental question regarding the history of the Moon was of its origin. Early hypotheses included fission from Earth, capture, and co-accretion. Today, the giant-impact hypothesis is widely accepted by the scientific community.

According to the giant-impact hypothesis, it is most likely that Lagrange points in specific locations in space relative to two orbiting objects may have provided a place for smaller objects to gather and eventually form a larger body. This body could have grown to about the size of Mars before leaving its orbit and colliding with Earth. This offers an explanation for where "Theia" may have come from.

== Geologic history ==
Cliffs in the lunar crust indicate the Moon shrank globally in the geologically recent past and is still shrinking today.

The geological history of the Moon has been analysed into six major epochs, called the lunar geologic timescale. Starting about 4.5 billion years ago, the newly-formed Moon was in a molten state, and was orbiting much closer to Earth, resulting in tidal forces. These tidal forces deformed the molten body into an ellipsoid, with the major axis pointed towards Earth.

The first important event in the geologic evolution of the Moon was the crystallization of the near global magma ocean. Its depth is not known with certainty, but several studies imply a depth of about 500 km or greater. The first minerals to form in this ocean were the iron and magnesium silicates olivine and pyroxene. Because these minerals were denser than the molten material around them, they sank. After crystallization was about 75% complete, less dense anorthositic plagioclase feldspar crystallized and floated, forming an anorthositic crust about 50 km in thickness. The majority of the magma ocean crystallized quickly (within about 100 million years or less), though the final remaining KREEP-rich magmas, which are highly enriched in incompatible and heat-producing elements, could have remained partially molten for several hundred million (or perhaps 1 billion) years. It appears that the final KREEP-rich magmas of the magma ocean eventually became concentrated within the region of Oceanus Procellarum and the Imbrium basin, a unique geologic province that is now known as the Procellarum KREEP Terrane.

Quickly after the lunar crust formed, or even as it was forming, different types of magmas that would give rise to the Mg-suite norites and troctolites began to form, although the depths at which this occurred are not known precisely. Recent theories suggest that Mg-suite plutonism was largely confined to the region of the Procellarum KREEP Terrane, and that these magmas are genetically related to KREEP in some manner, though their origin is still highly debated in the scientific community. The oldest of the Mg-suite rocks have crystallization ages of about 3.85 Ga. However, the last large impact that could have been excavated deep into the crust (the Imbrium basin) also occurred at 3.85 Ga before present. Thus, it seems probable that Mg-suite plutonic activity continued for a much longer time, and that younger plutonic rocks exist deep below the surface.

Analysis of the samples from the Moon seems to show that a lot of the Moon's impact basins formed in a short amount of time between about 4 and 3.85 Ga ago. This hypothesis is referred to as the lunar cataclysm or Late Heavy Bombardment. However, it is now recognized that ejecta from the Imbrium impact basin (one of the youngest large impact basins on the Moon) should be found at all of the Apollo landing sites. It is thus possible that ages for some impact basins (in particular Mare Nectaris) could have been mistakenly assigned the same age as Imbrium.

The lunar maria represent ancient flood basaltic eruptions. In comparison to terrestrial lavas, these contain higher iron abundances, have low viscosities, and some contain highly elevated abundances of the titanium-rich mineral ilmenite. The majority of basaltic eruptions occurred between about 3 and 3.5 Ga ago, though some mare samples have ages as old as 4.2 Ga. The youngest (based on the method of crater counting) was long thought to date to 1 billion years ago, but research in the 2010s has found evidence of eruptions from less than 50 million years in the past. Along with mare volcanism came pyroclastic eruptions, which launched molten basaltic materials hundreds of kilometers away from the volcano. A large portion of the mare formed, or flowed into, the low elevations associated with the nearside impact basins. However, Oceanus Procellarum does not correspond to any known impact structure, and the lowest elevations of the Moon within the farside South Pole-Aitken basin are only modestly covered by mare (see lunar mare for a more detailed discussion).

Moon – Oceanus Procellarum ("Ocean of Storms")

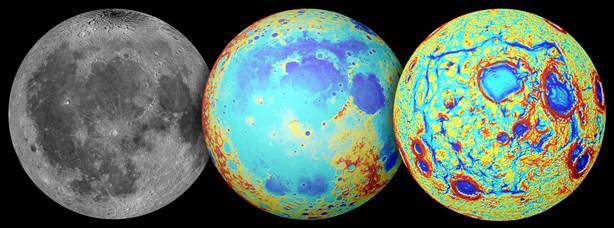
Ancient rift valleys – rectangular structure (visible – topography – GRAIL gravity gradients) (October 1, 2014)

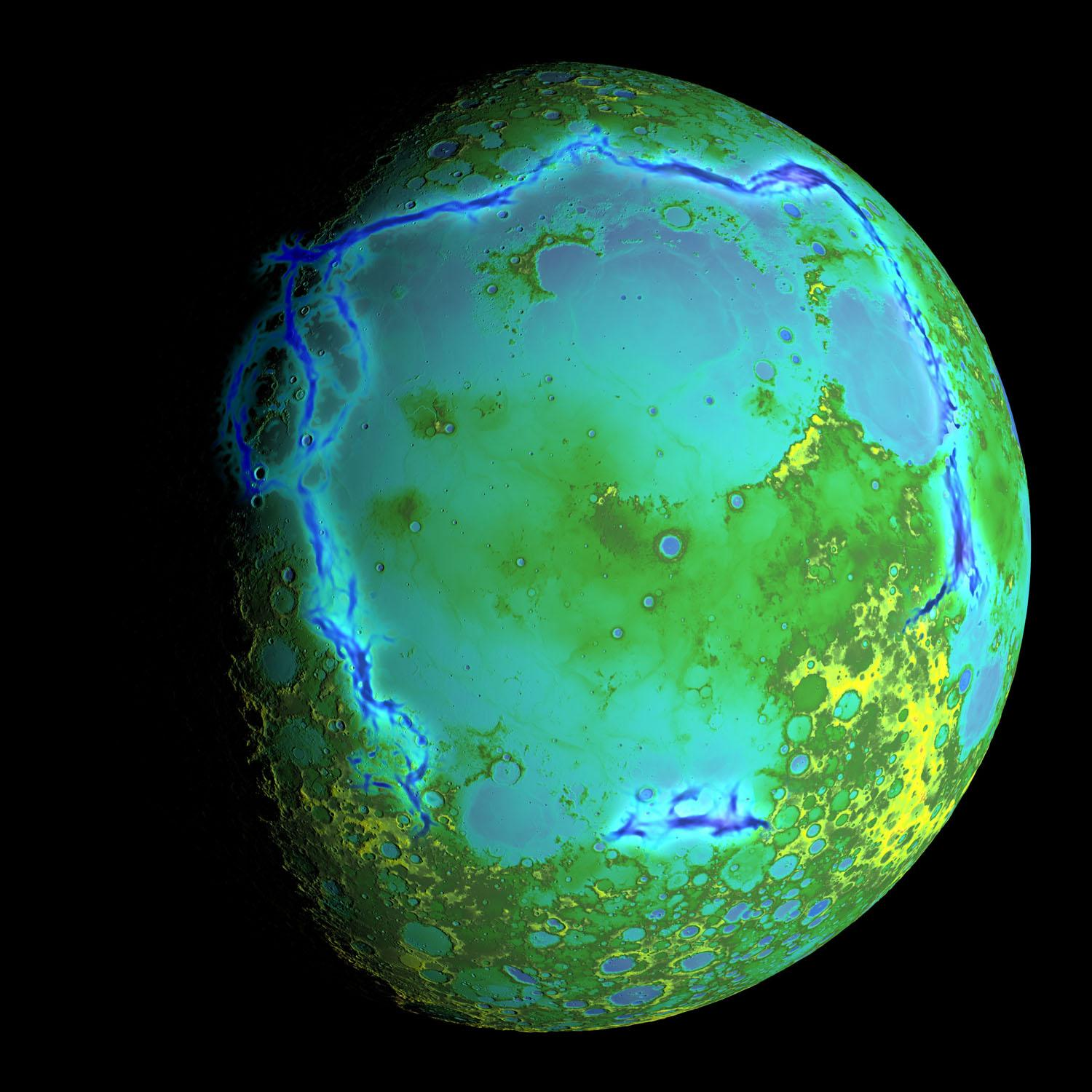
Ancient rift valleys – context

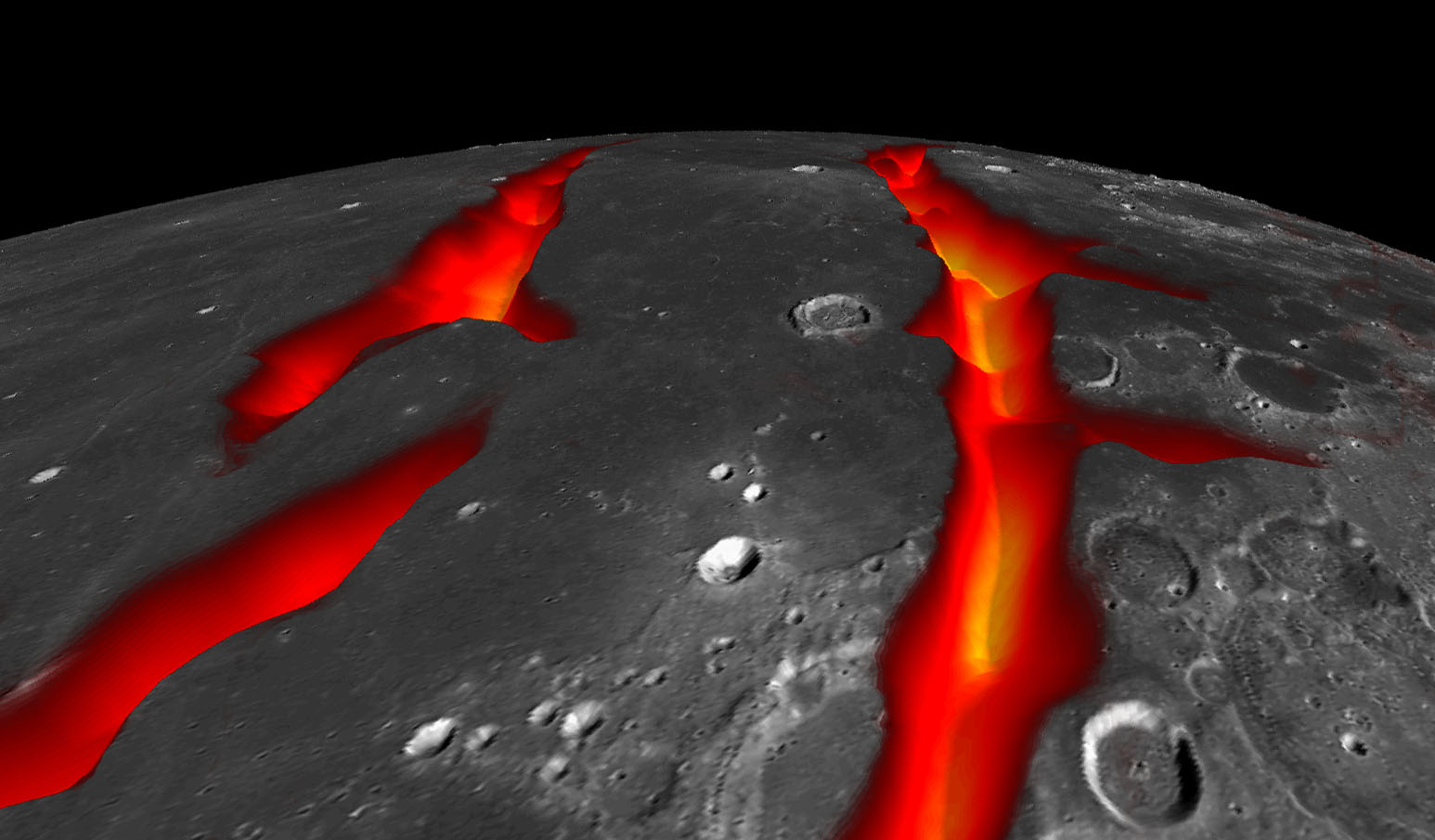
Ancient rift valleys – closeup (artist's concept)

Impacts by meteorites and comets are the only abrupt geologic force acting on the Moon today, though the variation of Earth tides on the scale of the Lunar anomalistic month causes small variations in stresses. Some of the most important craters used in lunar stratigraphy formed in this recent epoch. For example, the crater Copernicus, which has a depth of 3.76 km and a radius of 93 km, is estimated to have formed about 900 million years ago (though this is debatable). The Apollo 17 mission landed in an area in which the material coming from the crater Tycho might have been sampled. The study of these rocks seem to indicate that this crater could have formed 100 million years ago, though this is debatable as well. The surface has also experienced space weathering due to high energy particles, solar wind implantation, and micrometeorite impacts. This process causes the ray systems associated with young craters to darken until it matches the albedo of the surrounding surface. However, if the composition of the ray is different from the underlying crustal materials (as might occur when a "highland" ray is emplaced on the mare), the ray could be visible for much longer times.

After resumption of Lunar exploration in the 1990s, it was discovered there are scarps across the globe that are caused by the contraction due to cooling of the Moon.

=== Strata and epochs ===
At the top of the Moon's stratigraphy is the Copernican unit consisting of craters with a ray system. Below this is the Eratosthenian unit, defined by craters with established impact crater morphology, but lacking the ray system of the Copernican. These two units are present in smaller spots on the lunar surface. Further down the stratigraphy are the Mare units (previously known as the Procellarian unit), and the Imbrian unit which is related to ejecta and tectonics from the Imbrium basin. The bottom of the lunar stratigraphy is the pre-Nectarian unit, which consists of old crater plains.

== Lunar landscape ==
Moon 360 animation in 4K

The lunar landscape is characterized by impact craters, their ejecta, a few volcanoes, hills, lava flows and depressions filled by lava.

=== Highlands ===
The most distinctive aspect of the Moon is the contrast between its bright and dark zones. Lighter surfaces are the lunar highlands, which receive the name of terrae (singular terra, from the Latin for earth, land), and the darker plains are called maria (singular mare, from the Latin for sea), after Johannes Kepler who introduced the names in the 17th century. The highlands are anorthositic in composition, whereas the maria are basaltic. The maria often coincide with the "lowlands," but the lowlands (such as within the South Pole-Aitken basin) are not always covered by maria. The highlands are older than the visible maria, and hence are more heavily cratered.

=== Maria ===
The major products of volcanic processes on the Moon are evident to Earth-bound observers in the form of the lunar maria. These are large flows of basaltic lava that correspond to low-albedo surfaces covering nearly a third of the near side. Only a few percent of the farside has been affected by mare volcanism. Even before the Apollo missions confirmed it, most scientists already thought that the maria are lava-filled plains, because they have lava flow patterns and collapses attributed to lava tubes.

The ages of the mare basalts have been determined both by direct radiometric dating and by the technique of crater counting. The oldest radiometric ages are about 4.2 Ga (billion years), and ages of most of the youngest maria lavas have been determined from crater counting to be about 1 Ga. Due to better resolution of more recent imagery, about 70 small areas called irregular mare patches (each area only a few hundred meters or a few kilometers across) have been found in the maria that crater counting suggests were sites of volcanic activity in the geologically much more recent past (less than 50 million years). Volumetrically, most of the mare formed between about 3 and 3.5 Ga before present. The youngest lavas erupted within Oceanus Procellarum, whereas some of the oldest appear to be located on the farside. The maria are clearly younger than the surrounding highlands given their lower density of impact craters.

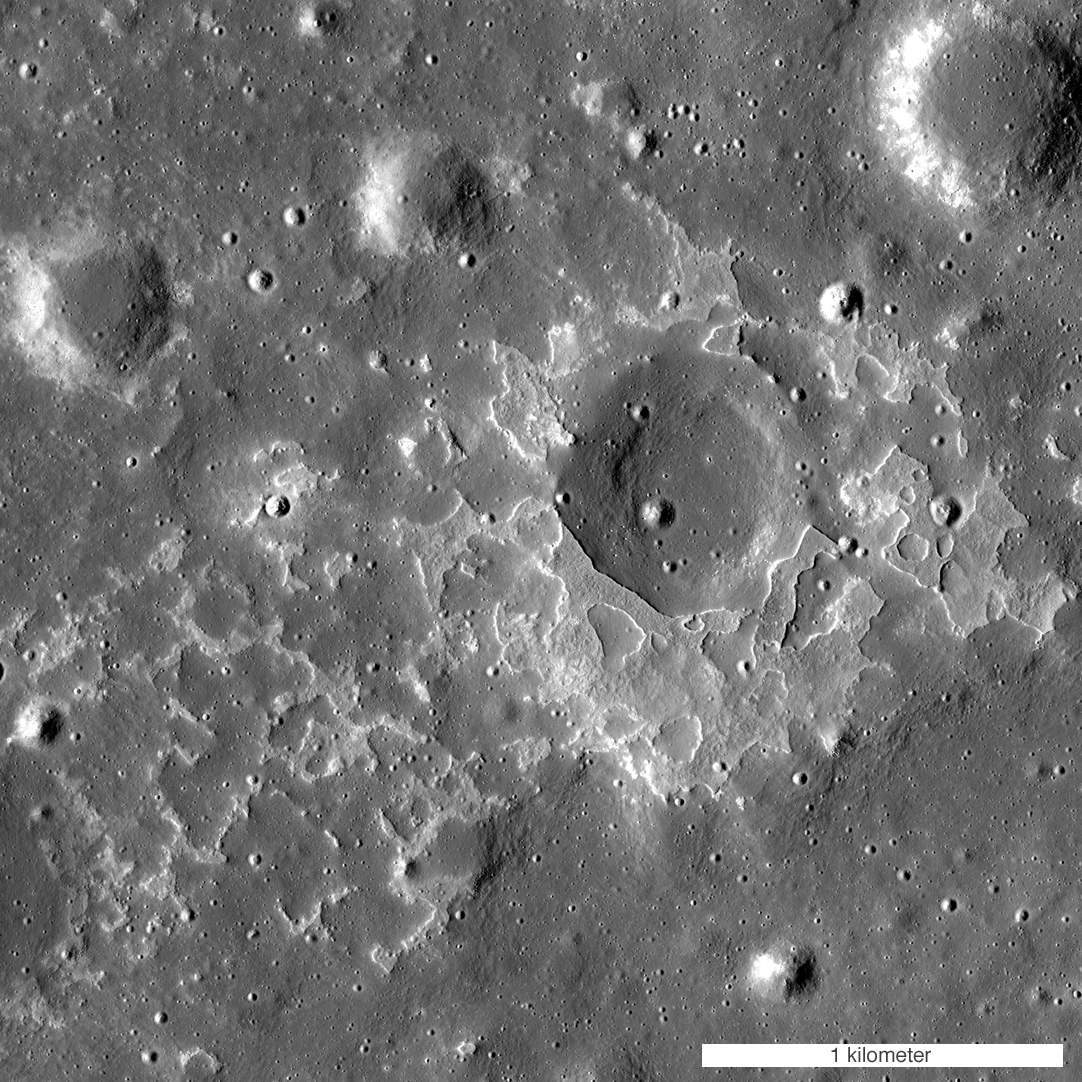
Moon – Evidence of young lunar volcanism (October 12, 2014)

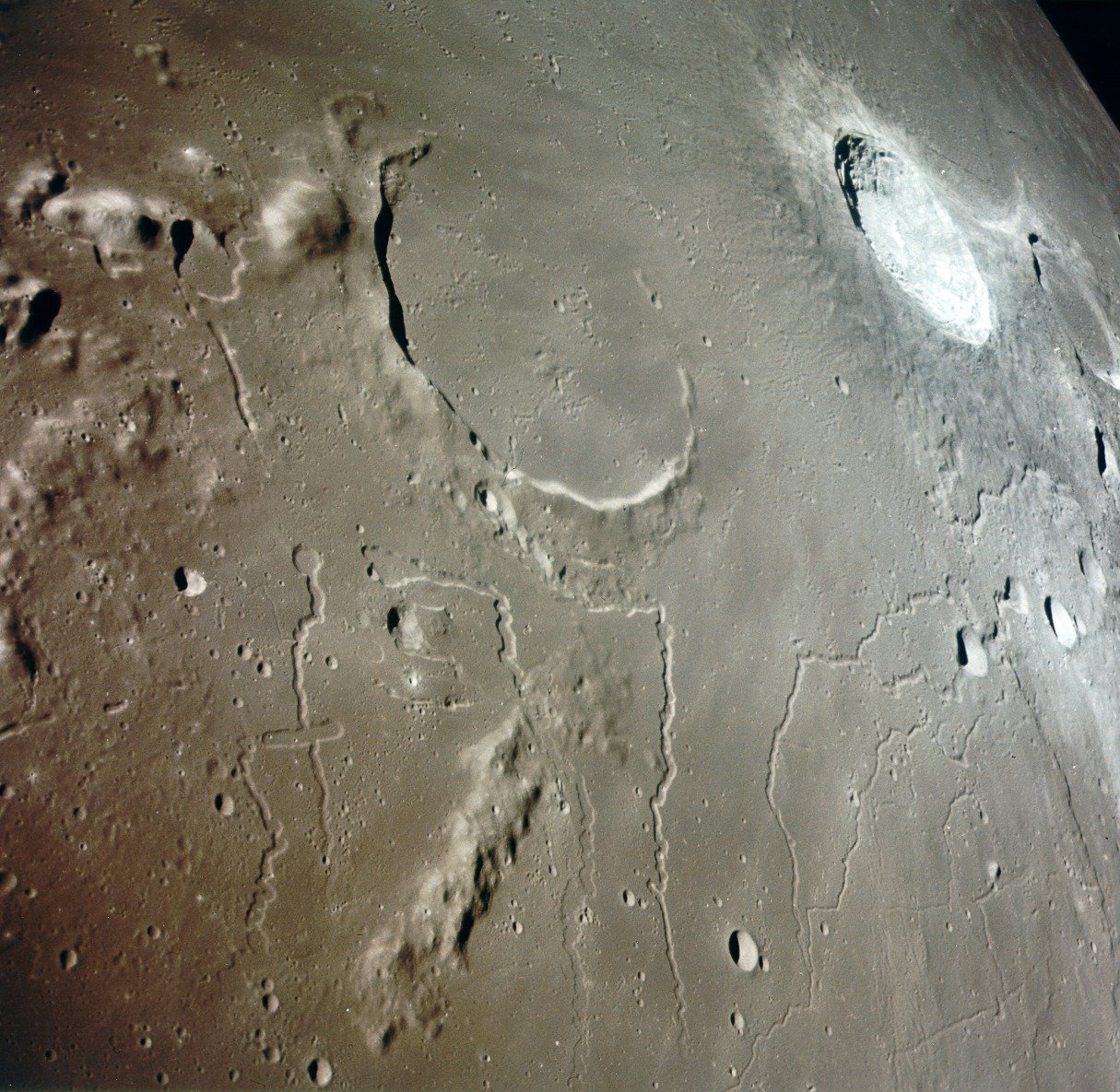
Volcanic rilles near the crater Prinz

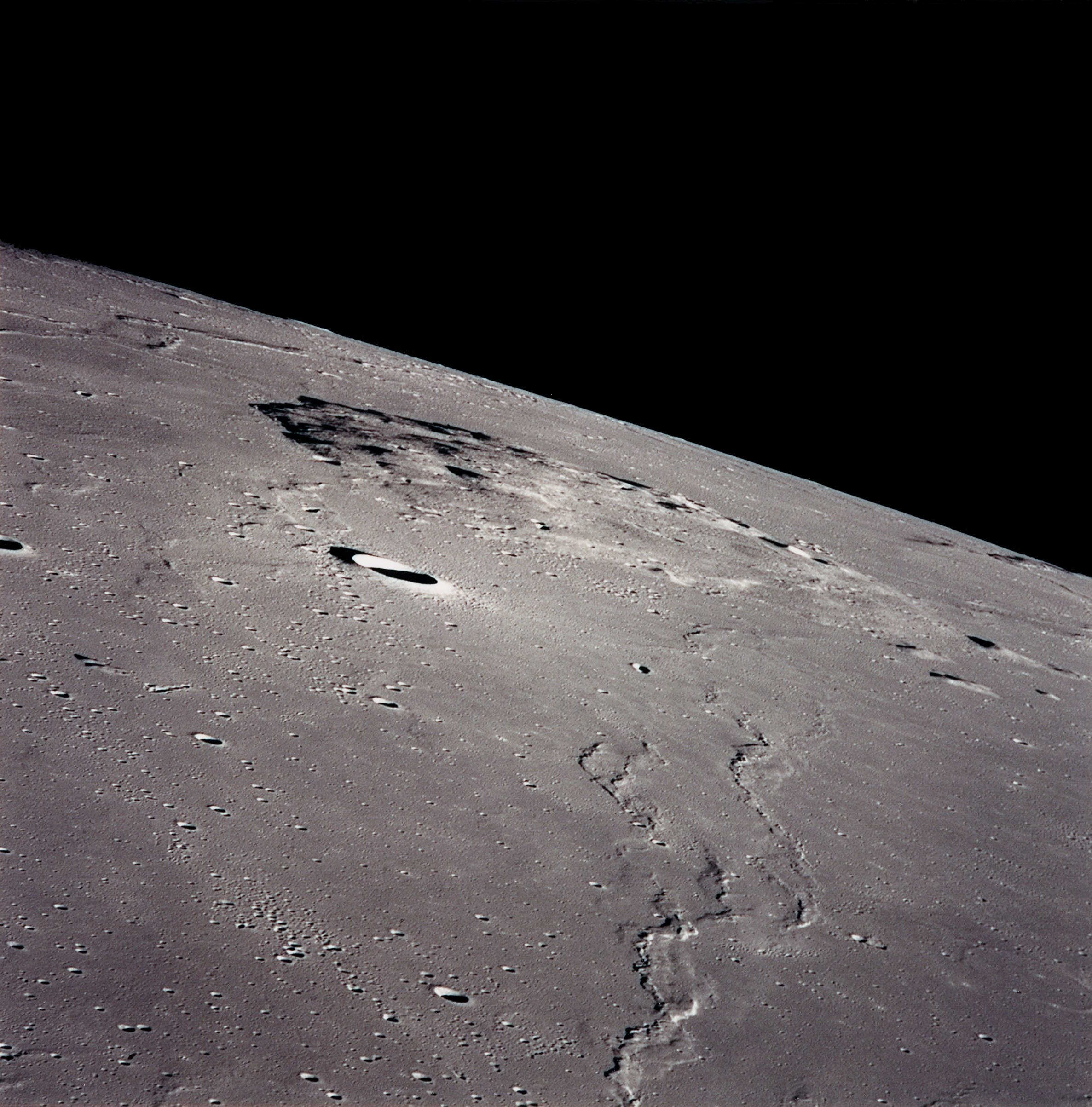
Volcanic domes within the Mons Rümker complex

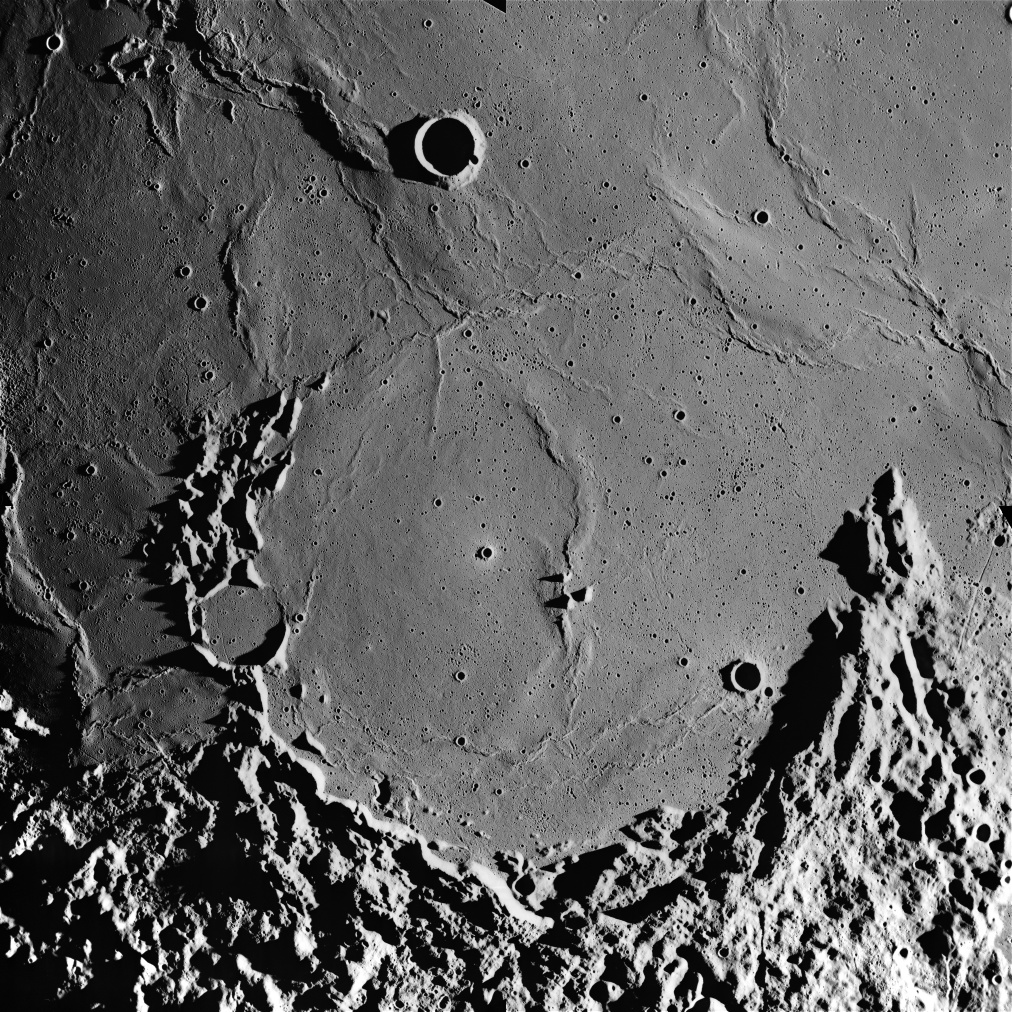
Wrinkle ridges within the crater Letronne

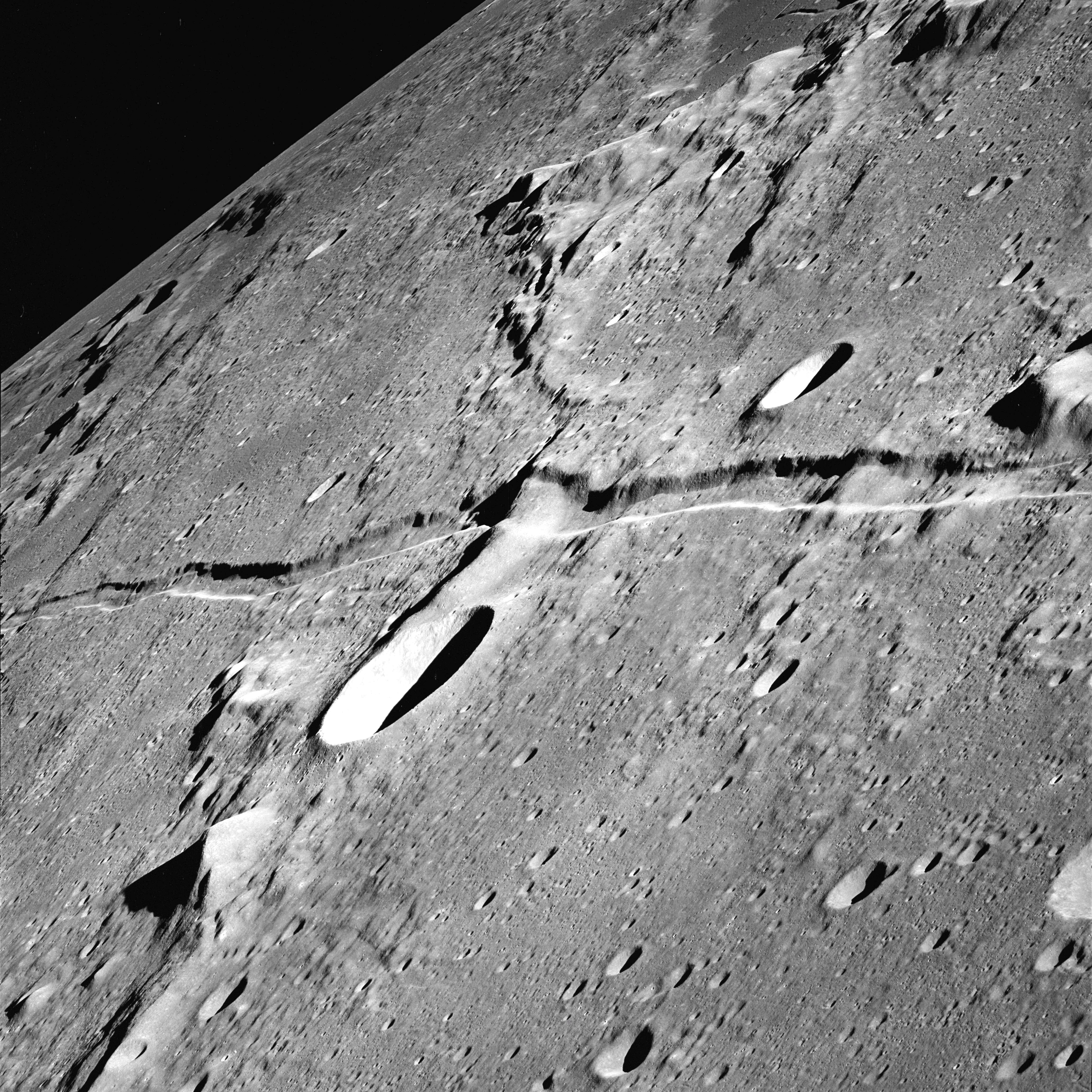
Rima Ariadaeus is a graben. NASA photo taken during Apollo 10 mission.

A large portion of maria erupted within, or flowed into, the low-lying impact basins on the lunar nearside. However, it is unlikely that a causal relationship exists between the impact event and mare volcanism because the impact basins are much older (by about 500 million years) than the mare fill. Furthermore, Oceanus Procellarum, which is the largest expanse of mare volcanism on the Moon, does not correspond to any known impact basin. It is commonly suggested that the reason the mare only erupted on the nearside is that the nearside crust is thinner than the farside. Although variations in the crustal thickness might act to modulate the amount of magma that ultimately reaches the surface, this hypothesis does not explain why the farside South Pole-Aitken basin, whose crust is thinner than Oceanus Procellarum, was only modestly filled by volcanic products.

Another type of deposit associated with the maria, although it also covers the highland areas, are the "dark mantle" deposits. These deposits cannot be seen with the naked eye, but they can be seen in images taken from telescopes or orbiting spacecraft. Before the Apollo missions, scientists predicted that they were deposits produced by pyroclastic eruptions. Some deposits appear to be associated with dark elongated ash cones, reinforcing the idea of pyroclasts. The existence of pyroclastic eruptions was later confirmed by the discovery of glass spherules similar to those found in pyroclastic eruptions here on Earth.

Many of the lunar basalts contain small holes called vesicles, which were formed by gas bubbles exsolving from the magma at the vacuum conditions encountered at the surface. It is not known with certainty which gases escaped these rocks, but carbon monoxide is one candidate.

The samples of pyroclastic glasses are of green, yellow, and red tints. The difference in color indicates the concentration of titanium that the rock has, with the green particles having the lowest concentrations (about 1%), and red particles having the highest concentrations (up to 14%, much more than the basalts with the highest concentrations).

==== Rilles ====
Rilles on the Moon sometimes resulted from the formation of localized lava channels. These generally fall into three categories, consisting of sinuous, arcuate, or linear shapes. By following these meandering rilles back to their source, they often lead to an old volcanic vent. One of the most notable sinuous rilles is the Vallis Schröteri feature, located in the Aristarchus plateau along the eastern edge of Oceanus Procellarum. An example of a sinuous rille exists at the Apollo 15 landing site, Rima Hadley, located on the rim of the Imbrium Basin. Based on observations from the mission, it is generally thought that this rille was formed by volcanic processes, a topic long debated before the mission took place.

==== Domes ====
A variety of shield volcanoes can be found in selected locations on the lunar surface, such as on Mons Rümker. These are thought to be formed by relatively viscous, possibly silica-rich lava, erupting from localized vents. The resulting lunar domes are wide, rounded, circular features with a gentle slope rising in elevation a few hundred meters to the midpoint. They are typically 8–12 km in diameter, but can be up to 20 km across. Some of the domes contain a small pit at their peak.

==== Wrinkle ridges ====
Wrinkle ridges are features created by compressive tectonic forces within the maria. These features represent buckling of the surface and form long ridges across parts of the maria. Some of these ridges may outline buried craters or other features beneath the maria. A prime example of such an outlined feature is the crater Letronne.

==== Grabens ====
Grabens are tectonic features that form under extensional stresses. Structurally, they are composed of two normal faults, with a down-dropped block between them. Most grabens are found within the lunar maria near the edges of large impact basins.

=== Impact craters ===
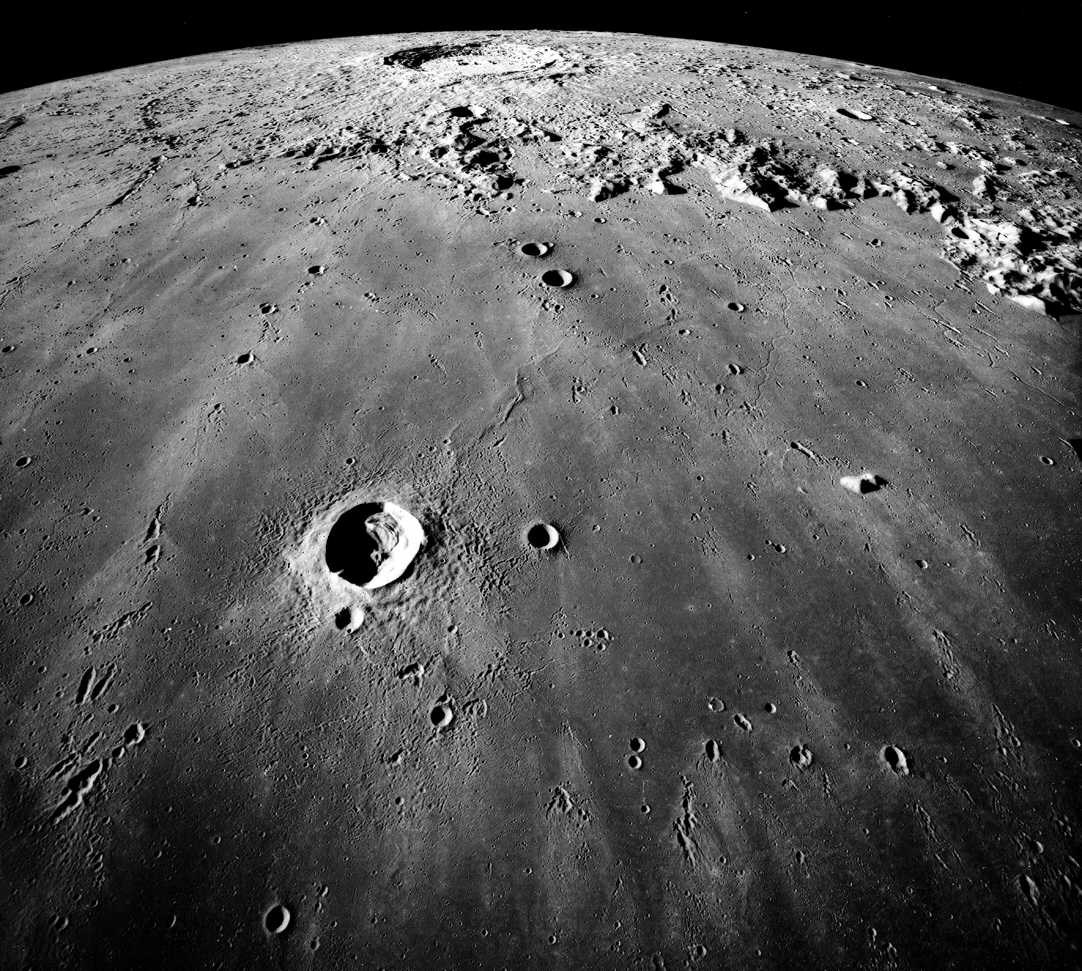
Mare Imbrium and the crater Copernicus

The origin of the Moon's craters as impact features became widely accepted only in the 1960s. This realization allowed the impact history of the Moon to be gradually worked out by means of the geologic principle of superposition. That is, if a crater (or its ejecta) overlaid another, it must be the younger. The amount of erosion experienced by a crater was another clue to its age, though this is more subjective. Adopting this approach in the late 1950s, Gene Shoemaker took the systematic study of the Moon away from the astronomers and placed it firmly in the hands of the lunar geologists.

Impact cratering is the most notable geological process on the Moon. The craters are formed when a solid body, such as an asteroid or comet, collides with the surface at a high velocity (mean impact velocities for the Moon are about 17 km per second). The kinetic energy of the impact creates a compression shock wave that radiates away from the point of entry. This is succeeded by a rarefaction wave, which is responsible for propelling most of the ejecta out of the crater. Finally there is a hydrodynamic rebound of the floor that can create a central peak.

These craters appear in a continuum of diameters across the surface of the Moon, ranging in size from tiny pits to the immense South Pole–Aitken basin with a diameter of nearly 2,500 km and a depth of 13 km. In a very general sense, the lunar history of impact cratering follows a trend of decreasing crater size with time. In particular, the largest impact basins were formed during the early periods, and these were successively overlaid by smaller craters. The size frequency distribution (SFD) of crater diameters on a given surface (that is, the number of craters as a function of diameter) approximately follows a power law with increasing number of craters with decreasing crater size. The vertical position of this curve can be used to estimate the age of the surface.

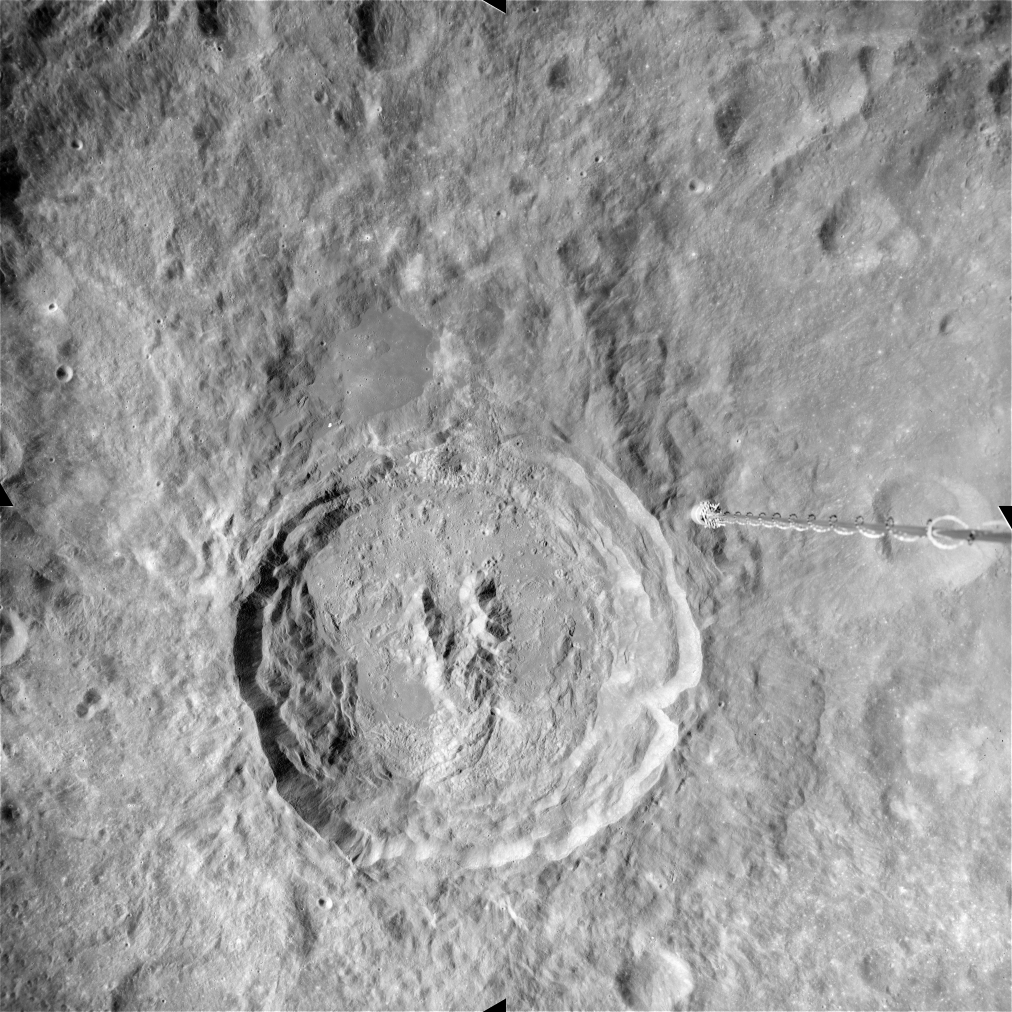
The lunar crater King displays the characteristic features of a large impact formation, with a raised rim, slumped edges, terraced inner walls, a relatively flat floor with some hills, and a central ridge. The Y-shaped central ridge is unusually complex in form.

The most recent impacts are distinguished by well-defined features, including a sharp-edged rim. Small craters tend to form a bowl shape, whereas larger impacts can have a central peak with flat floors. Larger craters generally display slumping features along the inner walls that can form terraces and ledges. The largest impact basins, the multiring basins, can even have secondary concentric rings of raised material.

The impact process excavates high albedo materials that initially gives the crater, ejecta, and ray system a bright appearance. The process of space weathering gradually decreases the albedo of this material such that the rays fade with time. Gradually the crater and its ejecta undergo impact erosion from micrometeorites and smaller impacts. This erosional process softens and rounds the features of the crater. The crater can also be covered in ejecta from other impacts, which can submerge features and even bury the central peak.

The ejecta from large impacts can include large blocks of material that reimpact the surface to form secondary impact craters. These craters are sometimes formed in clearly discernible radial patterns, and generally have shallower depths than primary craters of the same size. In some cases an entire line of these blocks can impact to form a valley. These are distinguished from catena, or crater chains, which are linear strings of craters that are formed when the impact body breaks up prior to impact.

Generally speaking, a lunar crater is roughly circular in form. Laboratory experiments at NASA's Ames Research Center have demonstrated that even very low-angle impacts tend to produce circular craters, and that elliptical craters start forming at impact angles below five degrees. However, a low angle impact can produce a central peak that is offset from the midpoint of the crater. Additionally, the ejecta from oblique impacts show distinctive patterns at different impact angles: asymmetry starting around 60˚ and a wedge-shaped "zone of avoidance" free of ejecta in the direction the projectile came from starting around 45˚.

Dark-halo craters are formed when an impact excavates lower albedo material from beneath the surface, then deposits this darker ejecta around the main crater. This can occur when an area of darker basaltic material, such as that found on the maria, is later covered by lighter ejecta derived from more distant impacts in the highlands. This covering conceals the darker material below, which is later excavated by subsequent craters.

The largest impacts produced melt sheets of molten rock that covered portions of the surface that could be as thick as a kilometer. Examples of such impact melt can be seen in the northeastern part of the Mare Orientale impact basin.

=== Regolith ===
The surface of the Moon has been subject to billions of years of collisions with both small and large asteroidal and cometary materials. Over time, these impact processes have pulverized and "gardened" the surface materials, forming a fine-grained layer termed regolith. The thickness of the lunar regolith varies between 2 meters (6.6 ft) beneath the younger maria, to up to 20 meters (66 ft) beneath the oldest surfaces of the lunar highlands. The regolith is predominantly composed of materials found in the region, but also contains traces of materials ejected by distant impact craters. The term mega-regolith is often used to describe the heavily fractured bedrock directly beneath the near-surface regolith layer.

The regolith contains rocks, fragments of minerals from the original bedrock, and glassy particles formed during the impacts. In most of the lunar regolith, half of the particles are made of mineral fragments fused by the glassy particles; these objects are called agglutinates. The chemical composition of the regolith varies according to its location; the regolith in the highlands is rich in aluminium and silica, just as the rocks in those regions. The regolith in the maria is rich in iron and magnesium and is silica-poor, as are the basaltic rocks from which it is formed.

The lunar regolith is very important because it also stores information about the history of the Sun. The atoms that compose the solar wind – mostly hydrogen, helium, neon, carbon and nitrogen – hit the lunar surface and insert themselves into the mineral grains. Upon analyzing the composition of the regolith, particularly its isotopic composition, it is possible to determine if the activity of the Sun has changed with time. The gases of the solar wind could be useful for future lunar bases, because oxygen, hydrogen (water), carbon and nitrogen are not only essential to sustain life, but are also potentially very useful in the production of fuel. The composition of the lunar regolith can also be used to infer its source origin.

=== Lunar lava tubes ===
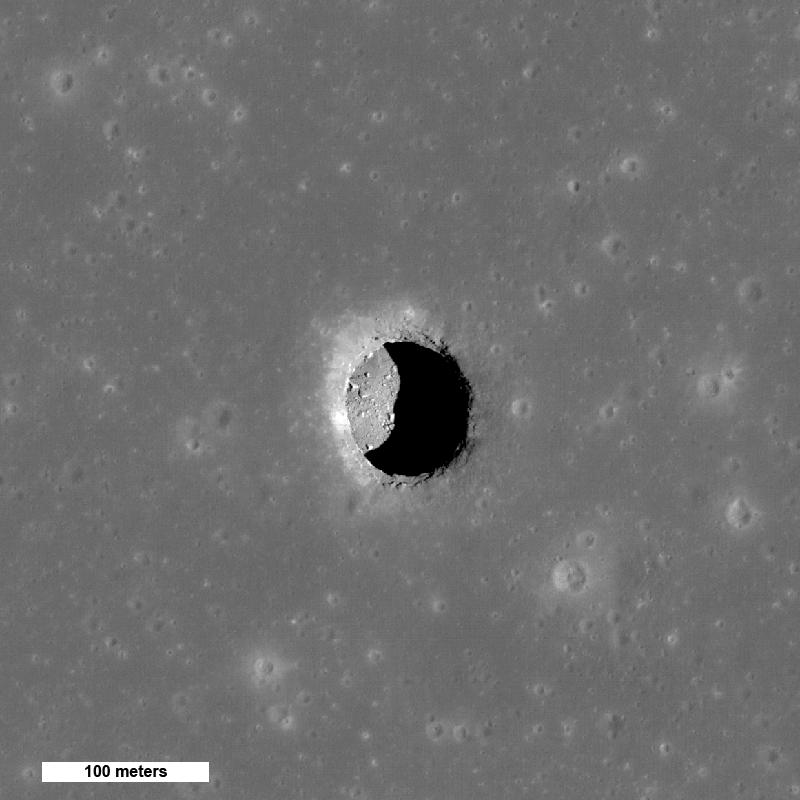
Lunar pit in Mare Tranquillitatis

Lunar lava tubes form a potentially important location for constructing a future lunar base, which may be used for local exploration and development, or as a human outpost to serve exploration beyond the Moon. A lunar lava cave potential has long been suggested and discussed in literature and thesis. Any intact lava tube on the Moon could serve as a shelter from the severe environment of the lunar surface, with its frequent meteorite impacts, high-energy ultraviolet radiation and energetic particles, and extreme diurnal temperature variations. Following the launch of the Lunar Reconnaissance Orbiter, many lunar lava tubes have been imaged. These lunar pits are found in several locations across the Moon, including Marius Hills, Mare Ingenii and Mare Tranquillitatis.

== Lunar magma ocean ==
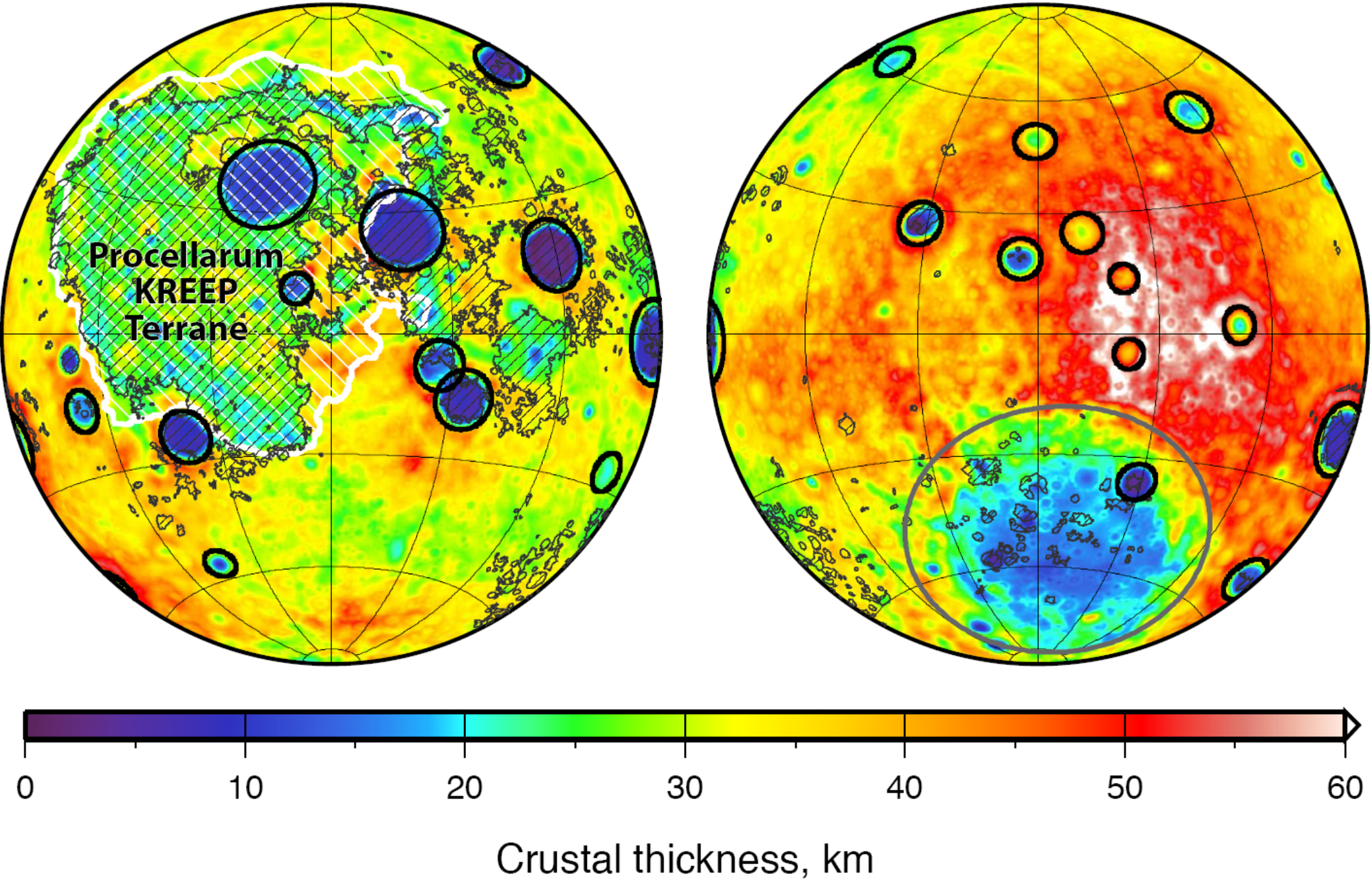
A map of the Moon coloured in terms of crust thickness and its types of regions marked: the KREEP rich magma terrane is hatch-marked and labeled on the left map hemisphere, the near side of the Moon, in its most prominent part as the Mare Procellarum KREEP Terrane (PKT); on the right (the far side), the gray circle marks the South Pole-Aitken Terrane (SPAT); on each hemispheres the 12 crater basins with crustal thinng larger than 200 km (120 mi) are marked with black circles; the rest is Felspathic Highlands Terrane (FHT), with the region of high-thickness (in red and white) being the inner FHT.

The first rocks brought back by Apollo 11 were basalts. Although the mission landed on Mare Tranquillitatis, a few millimetric fragments of rocks coming from the highlands were picked up. These are composed mainly of plagioclase feldspar; some fragments were composed exclusively of anorthite. The identification of these mineral fragments led to the bold hypothesis that a large portion of the Moon was once molten, and that the crust formed by fractional crystallization of this magma ocean.

A natural outcome of the hypothetical giant-impact event is that the materials that re-accreted to form the Moon must have been hot. Current models predict that a large portion of the Moon would have been molten shortly after the Moon formed, with estimates for the depth of this magma ocean ranging from about 500 km to complete melting. Crystallization of this magma ocean would have given rise to a differentiated body with a compositionally distinct crust and mantle and accounts for the major suites of lunar rocks.

As crystallization of the lunar magma ocean proceeded, minerals such as olivine and pyroxene would have precipitated and sank to form the lunar mantle. After crystallization was about three-quarters complete, anorthositic plagioclase would have begun to crystallize, and because of its low density, float, forming an anorthositic crust. Importantly, elements that are incompatible (i.e., those that partition preferentially into the liquid phase) would have been progressively concentrated into the magma as crystallization progressed, forming a KREEP-rich magma that initially should have been sandwiched between the crust and mantle. Evidence for this scenario comes from the highly anorthositic composition of the lunar highland crust, as well as the existence of KREEP-rich materials. Additionally, zircon analysis of Apollo 14 samples suggests the lunar crust differentiated 4.51±0.01 billion years ago.

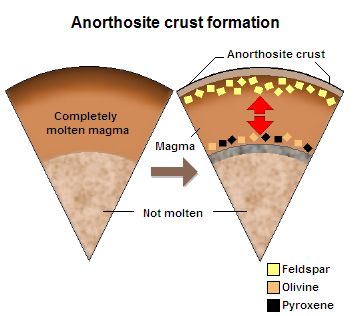
Formation of the anorthosite crust

== Lunar rocks ==
=== Surface materials ===
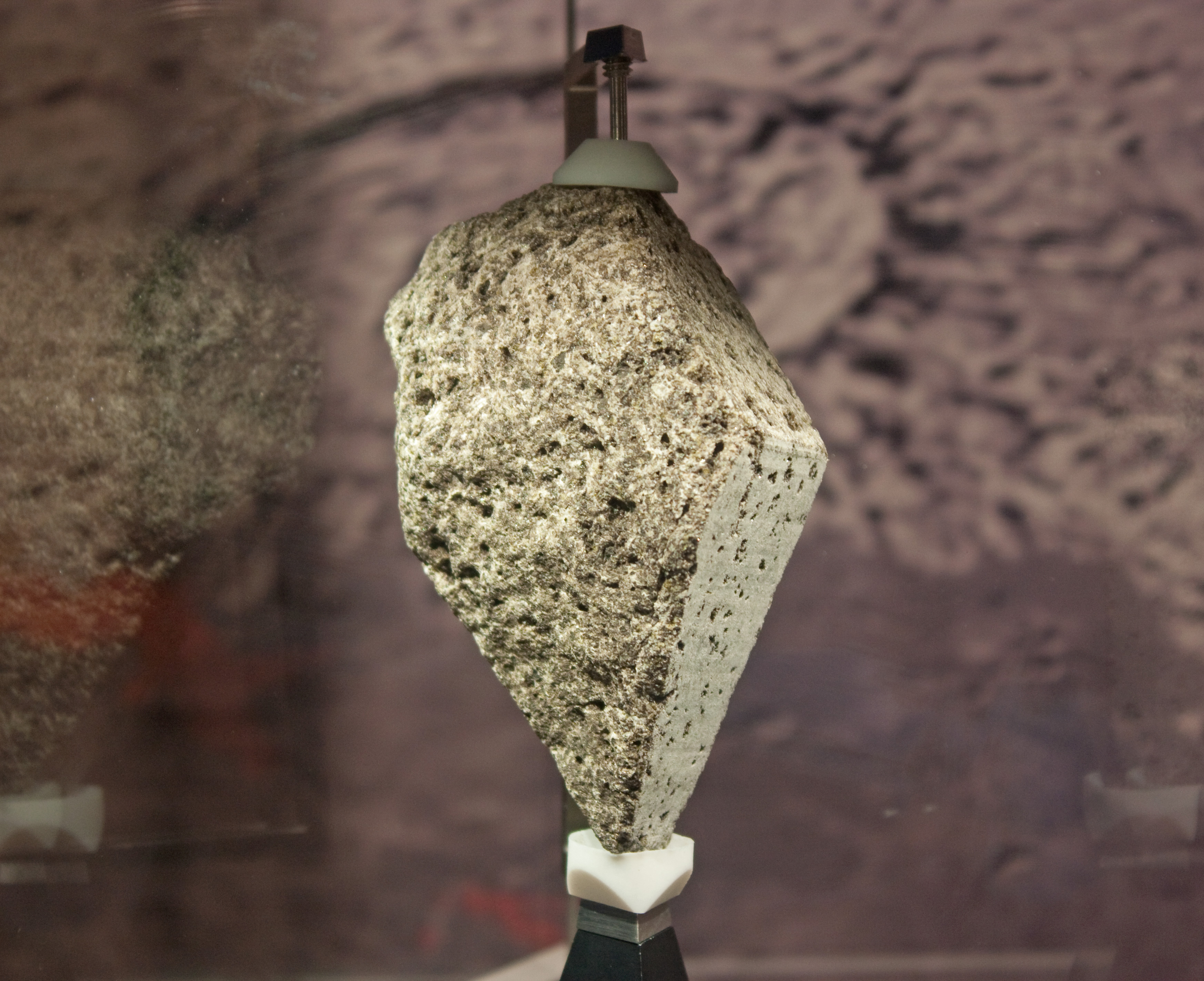
Olivine basalt collected by Apollo 15

The Apollo program brought back 380.05 kilograms (837.87 lb) of lunar surface material, most of which is stored at the Lunar Receiving Laboratory in Houston, Texas, and the uncrewed Soviet Luna programme returned 326 grams (11.5 oz) of lunar material. These rocks have proved to be invaluable in deciphering the geologic evolution of the Moon. Lunar rocks are in large part made of the same common rock forming minerals as found on Earth, such as olivine, pyroxene, and plagioclase feldspar (anorthite). Plagioclase feldspar is mostly found in the lunar crust, whereas pyroxene and olivine are typically seen in the lunar mantle. The mineral ilmenite is highly abundant in some mare basalts, and a new mineral named armalcolite (named for Armstrong, Aldrin, and Collins, the three members of the Apollo 11 crew) was first discovered in the lunar samples.

The maria are composed predominantly of basalt, whereas the highland regions are iron-poor and composed primarily of anorthosite, a rock composed primarily of calcium-rich plagioclase feldspar. Another significant component of the crust are the igneous Mg-suite rocks, such as the troctolites, norites, and KREEP-basalts. These rocks are thought to be related to the petrogenesis of KREEP.

Composite rocks on the lunar surface often appear in the form of breccias. Of these, the subcategories are called fragmental, granulitic, and impact-melt breccias, depending on how they were formed. The mafic impact melt breccias, which are typified by the low-K Fra Mauro composition, have a higher proportion of iron and magnesium than typical upper crust anorthositic rocks, as well as higher abundances of KREEP.

=== Composition of the maria ===
The main characteristics of the basaltic rocks with respect to the rocks of the lunar highlands is that the basalts contain higher abundances of olivine and pyroxene, and less plagioclase. They are richer in iron than terrestrial basalts, and also have lower viscosities. Some of them have high abundances of a ferro-titanic oxide called ilmenite. Because the first sampling of rocks contained a high content of ilmenite and other related minerals, they received the name of "high titanium" basalts. The Apollo 12 mission returned to Earth with basalts of lower titanium concentrations, and these were dubbed "low titanium" basalts. Subsequent missions, including the Soviet robotic probes, returned with basalts with even lower concentrations, now called "very low titanium" basalts. The Clementine space probe returned data showing that the mare basalts have a continuum in titanium concentrations, with the highest concentration rocks being the least abundant.

== Internal structure ==
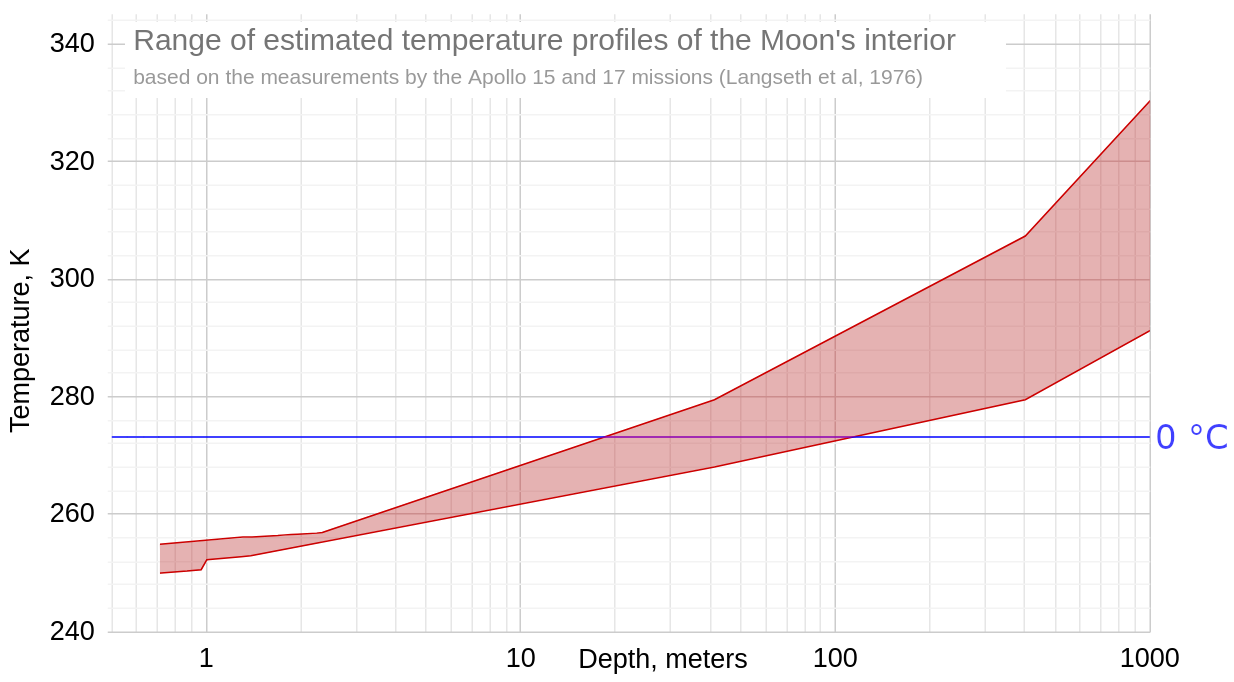
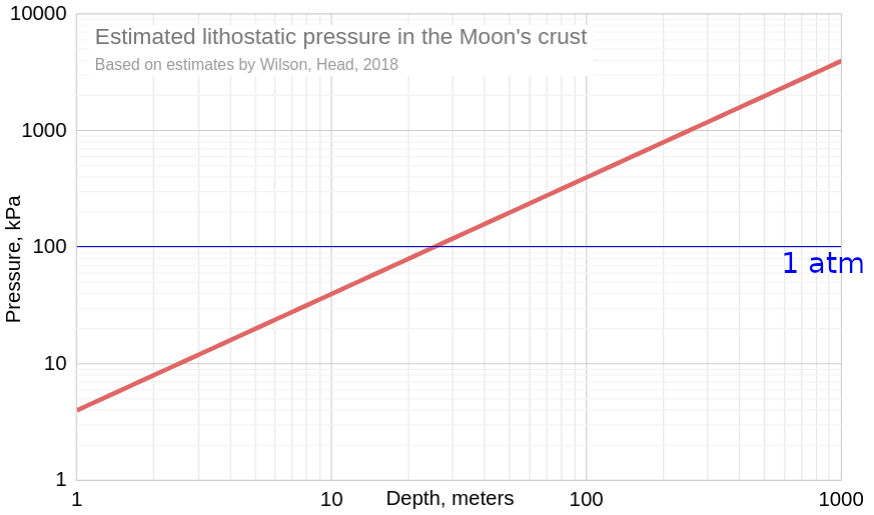
The temperature and pressure of the Moon's interior increase with depth

The current model of the interior of the Moon was derived using seismometers left behind during the crewed Apollo program missions, as well as investigations of the Moon's gravity field and rotation.

The mass of the Moon is sufficient to eliminate any voids within the interior, so it is estimated to be composed of solid rock throughout. Its low bulk density (~3346 kg m^{−3}) indicates a low metal abundance. Mass and moment of inertia constraints indicate that the Moon likely has an iron core that is less than about 450 km in radius. Studies of the Moon's physical librations (small perturbations to its rotation) furthermore indicate that the core is still molten. Most planetary bodies and moons have iron cores that are about half the size of the body. The Moon is thus anomalous in having a core whose size is only about one quarter of its radius.

The crust of the Moon is on average about 50 km thick (though this is uncertain by about ±15 km). It is estimated that the far-side crust is on average thicker than the near side by about 15 km. Seismology has constrained the thickness of the crust only near the Apollo 12 and Apollo 14 landing sites. Although the initial Apollo-era analyses suggested a crustal thickness of about 60 km at this site, recent reanalyses of this data suggest that it is thinner, somewhere between about 30 and 45 km.

=== Magnetic field ===
Compared with Earth, the Moon has a weak external magnetic field. Other significant differences are that the Moon does not currently have a dipolar magnetic field (as would be generated by a geodynamo in its core), and the magnetizations that are present are almost entirely crustal in origin. One hypothesis holds that the crustal magnetizations were acquired early in lunar history when a geodynamo was still operating. However, the lunar core's small size is a potential obstacle to this hypothesis. Alternatively, it is possible that transient magnetic fields could be generated during impact processes on airless bodies such as the Moon. In support of this, it has been noted that the largest crustal magnetizations appear to be located near the antipodes of the largest impact basins. Although the Moon does not have a dipolar magnetic field like Earth's, some returned rocks have strong magnetizations. Furthermore, measurements from orbit show that some portions of the lunar surface are associated with strong magnetic fields.

== See also ==
- Lunar geologic timescale
- Lunar resources
- Selenography
- Transient lunar phenomenon
