= Anorthosite =

Mafic intrusive igneous rock composed predominantly of plagioclase

- Igneous rock
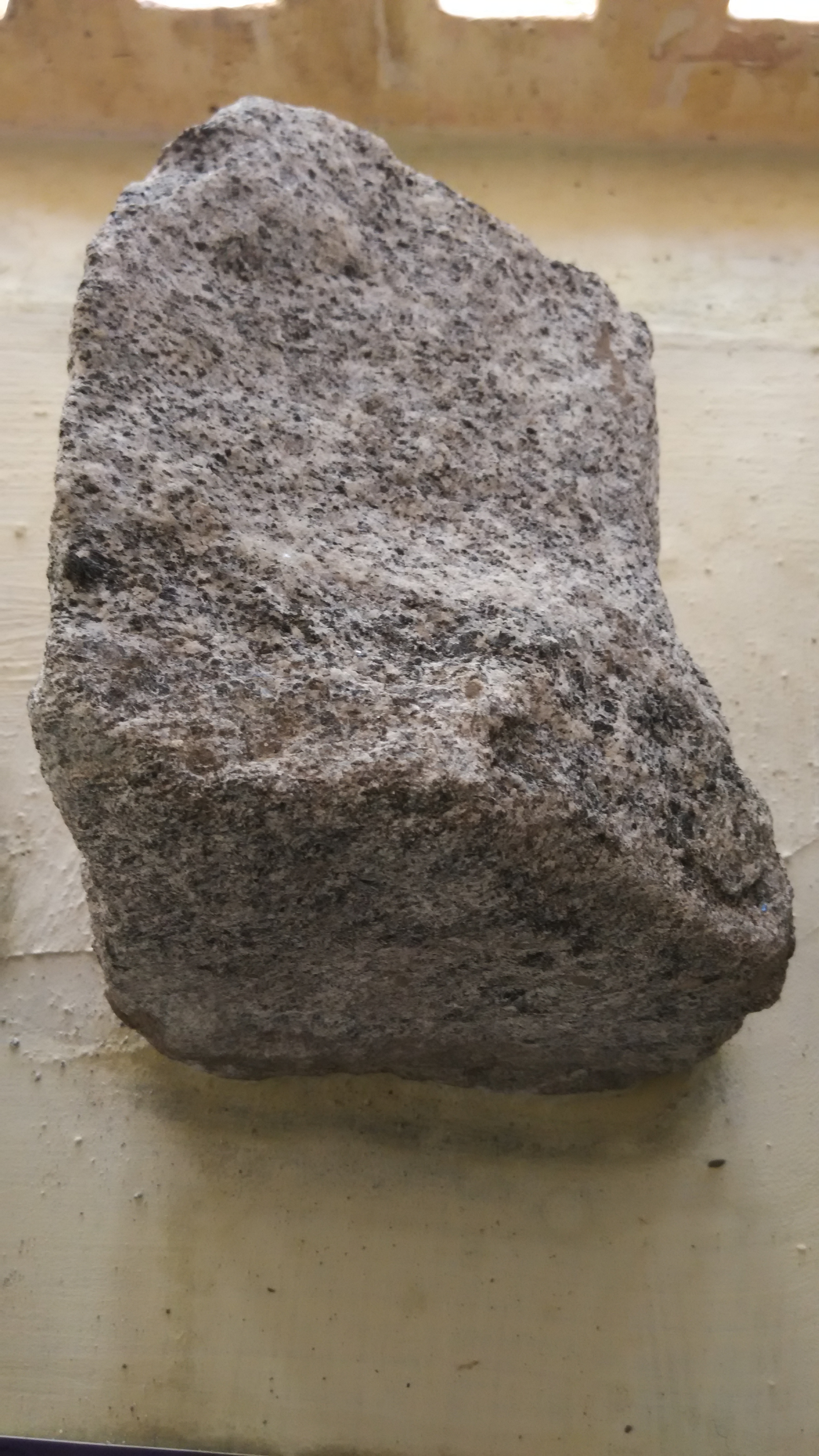
- Anorthosite from Salem district, Tamil Nadu, India

Composition
- Primary: Anorthite
- Secondary: Mafic minerals

Anorthosite (/əˈnɔːrθəsaɪt/) is a phaneritic, intrusive igneous rock characterized by its composition: mostly plagioclase feldspar (90–100%), with a minimal mafic component (0–10%). Pyroxene, ilmenite, magnetite, and olivine are the mafic minerals most commonly present.

Anorthosites are of enormous geologic interest, because it is still not fully understood how they form. Most models involve separating plagioclase crystals based on their density. Plagioclase crystals are usually less dense than magma; so, as plagioclase crystallizes in a magma chamber, the plagioclase crystals float to the top, concentrating there.

Anorthosite on Earth can be divided into five types:

1. Archean anorthosites
2. Proterozoic anorthosite (also known as massif or massif-type anorthosite) – the most abundant type of anorthosite on Earth
3. Layers within Layered Intrusions (e.g., Bushveld and Stillwater intrusions)
4. Mid-ocean ridge and transform fault anorthosites
5. Anorthosite xenoliths in other rocks (often granites, kimberlites, or basalts)

Of these, the first two are the most common. These two types have different modes of occurrence, appear to be restricted to different periods in Earth's history, and are thought to have had different origins.

Lunar anorthosites constitute the light-coloured areas of the Moon's surface and have been the subject of much research.

The presence of Martian anorthosites has also been confirmed and is the subject of on-going research.

== Proterozoic anorthosite massifs ==
=== Age ===
Proterozoic anorthosites were emplaced during the Proterozoic Eon (c. 2,500–542 Ma), though most were emplaced between 1,800 and 1,000 Ma.

=== Occurrence ===
Proterozoic anorthosites typically occur as extensive stocks or batholiths. The areal extent of anorthosite batholiths ranges from relatively small (dozens or hundreds of square kilometers) to nearly 20,000 km^{2} (7,700 sq mi), in the instance of the Nain Plutonic Suite or Mistastin crater in northern Labrador, Canada.

Major occurrences of Proterozoic anorthosite are found in the southeast U.S., the Appalachian Mountains (e.g., the Honeybrook Upland of eastern Pennsylvania), eastern Canada (e.g., the Grenville Province), across southern Scandinavia and eastern Europe. Mapped onto the Pangaean continental configuration of that eon, these occurrences are all contained in a single straight belt, and must all have been emplaced intracratonally. The conditions and constraints of this pattern of origin and distribution are not clear. However, see the Origins section below.

=== Related rocks ===
Many Proterozoic anorthosites occur in spatial association with other highly distinctive, contemporaneous rock types: the so-called 'anorthosite suite' or 'anorthosite-mangerite-charnockite-granite (AMCG) complex'.

These rock types can include:

- Mangerite: a pyroxene-bearing monzonite intrusive igneous rock
- Charnockite: an orthopyroxene-bearing quartz-feldspar rock, once thought to be intrusive igneous, now recognized as metamorphic
- Iron-rich felsic rocks, including monzonite and rapakivi granite
- Iron-rich diorite, gabbro, and norite
- Leucocratic mafic rocks such as leucotroctolite and leuconorite

Though co-eval, these rocks likely represent chemically-independent magmas, likely produced by melting of country rock into which the anorthosites intruded.

Importantly, large volumes of ultramafic rocks are not found in association with Proterozoic anorthosites.

=== Physical characteristics ===
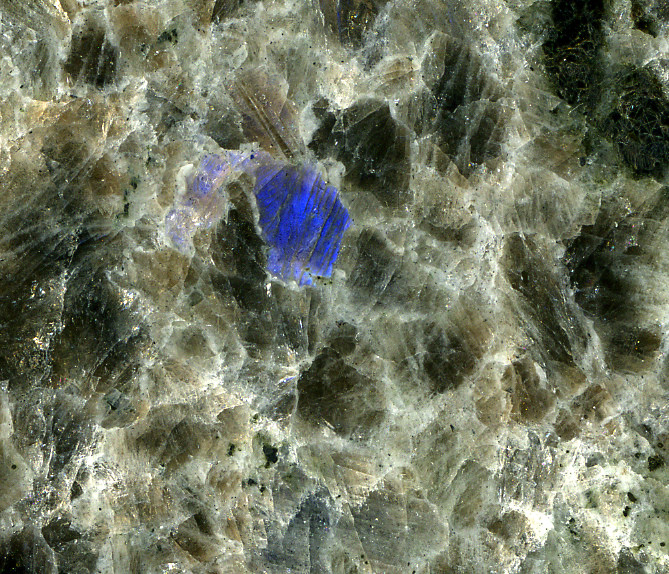
Nain Anorthosite, a mid-Mesoproterozoic intrusion (1.29 to 1.35 billion years), Labrador. Polished slab; blue color is labradorescence.

Since they are primarily composed of plagioclase feldspar, most of Proterozoic anorthosites appear, in outcrop, to be grey or bluish. Individual plagioclase crystals may be black, white, blue, or grey, and may exhibit an iridescence known as labradorescence on fresh surfaces. The feldspar variety labradorite is commonly present in anorthosites. Mineralogically, labradorite is a compositional term for any calcium-rich plagioclase feldspar containing 50–70 molecular percent anorthite (An 50–70), regardless of whether it shows labradorescence. The mafic mineral in Proterozoic anorthosite may be clinopyroxene, orthopyroxene, olivine, or, more rarely, amphibole. Oxides, such as magnetite or ilmenite, are also common.

Most anorthosite plutons are very coarse grained; that is, the individual plagioclase crystals and the accompanying mafic mineral are more than a few centimetres long. Less commonly, plagioclase crystals are megacrystic, or larger than one metre long. However, most Proterozoic anorthosites are deformed, and such large plagioclase crystals have recrystallized to form smaller crystals, leaving only the outline of the larger crystals behind.

While many Proterozoic anorthosite plutons appear to have no large-scale relict igneous structures (having instead post-emplacement deformational structures), some do have igneous layering, which may be defined by crystal size, mafic content, or chemical characteristics. Such layering clearly has origins with a rheologically liquid-state magma.

=== Chemical and isotopic characteristics ===
Proterozoic anorthosites are typically >90% plagioclase, and the plagioclase composition is commonly between An_{40} and An_{60} (40–60% anorthite). This compositional range is intermediate, and is one of the characteristics which distinguish Proterozoic anorthosites from Archean anorthosites (which are typically >An_{80}).

Proterozoic anorthosites often have significant mafic components in addition to plagioclase. These phases can include olivine, pyroxene, Fe-Ti oxides, and/or apatite. Mafic minerals in Proterozoic anorthosites have a wide range of composition, but are not generally highly magnesian.

The trace-element chemistry of Proterozoic anorthosites, and the associated rock types, has been examined in some detail by researchers with the aim of arriving at a plausible genetic theory. However, there is still little agreement on just what the results mean for anorthosite genesis; see the 'Origins' section below. A very short list of results, including results for rocks thought to be related to Proterozoic anorthosites,

Some research has focused on neodymium (Nd) and strontium (Sr) isotopic determinations for anorthosites, particularly for anorthosites of the Nain Plutonic Suite (NPS). Such isotopic determinations are of use in gauging the viability of prospective sources for magmas that gave rise to anorthosites. Some results are detailed below in the 'Origins' section.

==== High-alumina orthopyroxene megacrysts (HAOMs) ====
Many Proterozoic-age anorthosites contain large crystals of orthopyroxene with distinctive compositions. These are the so-called high-alumina orthopyroxene megacrysts (HAOM).

HAOM are distinctive because 1) they contain higher amounts of Al than typically seen in orthopyroxenes; 2) they are cut by numerous thin lathes of plagioclase, which may represent exsolution lamellae; and 3) they appear to be older than the anorthosites in which they are found.

The origins of HAOMs are debated. One possible model suggests that, during anorthosite formation, a mantle-derived melt (or partially-crystalline mush) was injected into the lower crust and began crystallizing. HAOMs would have crystallized out during this time, perhaps as long as 80–120 million years. The HAOM-bearing melt could then have risen to the upper crust. This model is supported by the fact that aluminium is more soluble in orthopyroxene at high pressure. In this model, the HAOM represent lower-crustal cumulates that are related to the anorthosite source-magma. One problem with this model is that it requires the anorthosite source-magma to sit in the low crust for a considerable time. To solve this, some authors suggest that the HAOMs may have formed in the lower crust independent of the anorthosite source-magma. Later, the anorthosite source-magma may have entrained pieces of the HAOM-bearing lower crust on its way upward. Other researchers consider the chemical compositions of the HAOM to be the product of rapid crystallization at moderate or low pressures, eliminating the need for a lower-crustal origin altogether.

=== Origins of Proterozoic anorthosites ===
The origins of Proterozoic anorthosites have been a subject of theoretical debate for many decades. A brief synopsis of this problem is as follows:

The problem begins with the generation of magma, the necessary precursor of any igneous rock.

Magma generated by small amounts of partial melting of the mantle is generally of basaltic composition. Under normal conditions, the composition of basaltic magma requires it to crystallize between 50 and 70% plagioclase, with the bulk of the remainder of the magma crystallizing as mafic minerals. However, anorthosites are defined by a high plagioclase content (90–100% plagioclase), and are not found in association with contemporaneous ultramafic rocks. This is now known as 'the anorthosite problem.' Proposed solutions to the anorthosite problem have been diverse, with many of the proposals drawing on different geological subdisciplines.

It was suggested early in the history of anorthosite debate that a special type of magma, anorthositic magma, had been generated at depth, and emplaced into the crust. However, the solidus of an anorthositic magma is too high for it to exist as a liquid for very long at normal ambient crustal temperatures, so this appears to be unlikely. The presence of water vapor has been shown to lower the solidus temperature of anorthositic magma to more reasonable values, but most anorthosites are relatively dry. It may be postulated, then, that water vapor be driven off by subsequent metamorphism of the anorthosite, but some anorthosites are undeformed, thereby invalidating the suggestion.

The discovery, in the late 1970s, of anorthositic dykes in the Nain Plutonic Suite, suggested that the possibility of anorthositic magmas existing at crustal temperatures needed to be reexamined. However, the dykes were later shown to be more complex than was originally thought.

In summary, though liquid-state processes clearly operate in some anorthosite plutons, the plutons are probably not derived from anorthositic magmas.

Many researchers have argued that anorthosites are the products of basaltic magma, and that mechanical removal of mafic minerals has occurred. Since the mafic minerals are not found with the anorthosites, these minerals must have been left at either a deeper level or the base of the crust. A typical theory is as follows: partial melting of the mantle generates a basaltic magma, which does not immediately ascend into the crust. Instead, the basaltic magma forms a large magma chamber at the base of the crust and fractionates large amounts of mafic minerals, which sink to the bottom of the chamber. The co-crystallizing plagioclase crystals float, and eventually are emplaced into the crust as anorthosite plutons. Most of the sinking mafic minerals form ultramafic cumulates which stay at the base of the crust.

This theory has many appealing features, of which one is the capacity to explain the chemical composition of high-alumina orthopyroxene megacrysts (HAOM). This is detailed below in the section devoted to the HAOM. However, on its own, this hypothesis cannot coherently explain the origins of anorthosites, because it does not fit with, among other things, some important isotopic measurements made on anorthositic rocks in the Nain Plutonic Suite. The Nd and Sr isotopic data show the magma which produced the anorthosites cannot have been derived only from the mantle. Instead, the magma that gave rise to the Nain Plutonic Suite anorthosites must have had a significant crustal component. This discovery led to a slightly more complicated version of the previous hypothesis: Large amounts of basaltic magma form a magma chamber at the base of the crust, and, while crystallizing, assimilating large amounts of crust.

This small addendum explains both the isotopic characteristics and certain other chemical niceties of Proterozoic anorthosite. However, at least one researcher has cogently argued, on the basis of geochemical data, that the mantle's role in production of anorthosites must actually be very limited: the mantle provides only the impetus (heat) for crustal melting, and a small amount of partial melt in the form of basaltic magma. Thus anorthosites are, in this view, derived almost entirely from lower crustal melts.

== Lunar anorthosite ==
On the Moon, anorthosite is the dominant rock type of the lunar highlands which covers ~80% of the lunar surface. Lunar anorthosite is characterized as ferroan anorthosite (FAN), or magnesium anorthosite (MAN). Pristine lunar FAN is some of the oldest lunar rock and the original cumulate of the lunar magma ocean, with the Mg-suite forming from later impacts and plutonism. However, debate exists on the magma ocean fractionation complicated by surface impact mixing with evidence potentially indicating MAN being older and more primitive.

Lunar anorthosite is associated with two other rock types: norite and troctolite. Together, they comprise the "ANT" suite of moon rocks.

== Archean anorthosites ==
Archean anorthosites represent the second largest anorthosite deposits on Earth. Most have been dated between 3,200 and 2,800 Ma, and commonly associated with basalts and/or greenstone belts.

Archean anorthosites are distinct texturally and mineralogically from Proterozoic anorthosite bodies. Their most characteristic feature is the presence of equant, euhedral megacrysts (up to 30 cm) of plagioclase surrounded by a fine-grained mafic groundmass. The plagioclase in these anorthosites is commonly An80-90.

== Economic value ==
The material's high temperature resistance makes it valuable in applications in the aerospace and defense industries. Its low alkali content also makes it a valuable raw material for fiberglass, requiring minimal refinement or pre-processing. Anorthosite could potentially be used in aluminium production as an alternative to bauxite.

=== Contents ===
The primary economic value of anorthosite bodies is the titanium-bearing oxide ilmenite. However, some Proterozoic anorthosite bodies have large amounts of labradorite, which is quarried for its value as both a gemstone and a building material. Archean anorthosites, because they are aluminium-rich, have large amounts of aluminium substituting for silicon; a few of these bodies are mined as ores of aluminium.

Anorthosite was prominently represented in rock samples brought back from the Moon, and is important in investigations of Mars, Venus, and meteorites.

=== Soil development on anorthosite ===
In the Adirondack Mountains, soils on anorthositic rock tend to be stony loamy sand with classic podzol profile development usually evident. In the San Gabriel Mountains, soils on anorthosite have a dominance of 1:1 clay minerals (kaolinite and halloysite) in contrast to more mafic rock over which 2:1 clays develop.

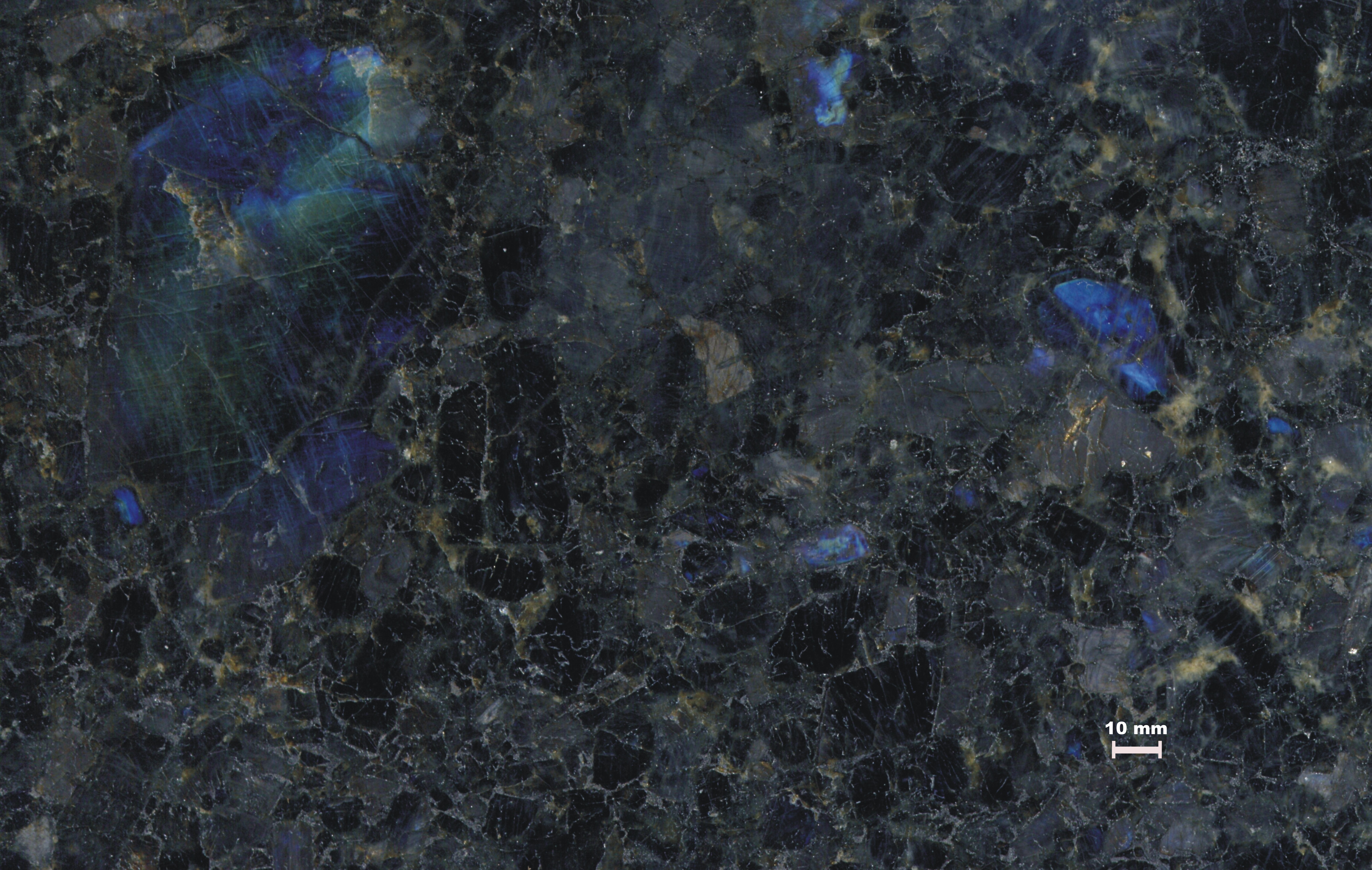
Anorthosite from southern Finland

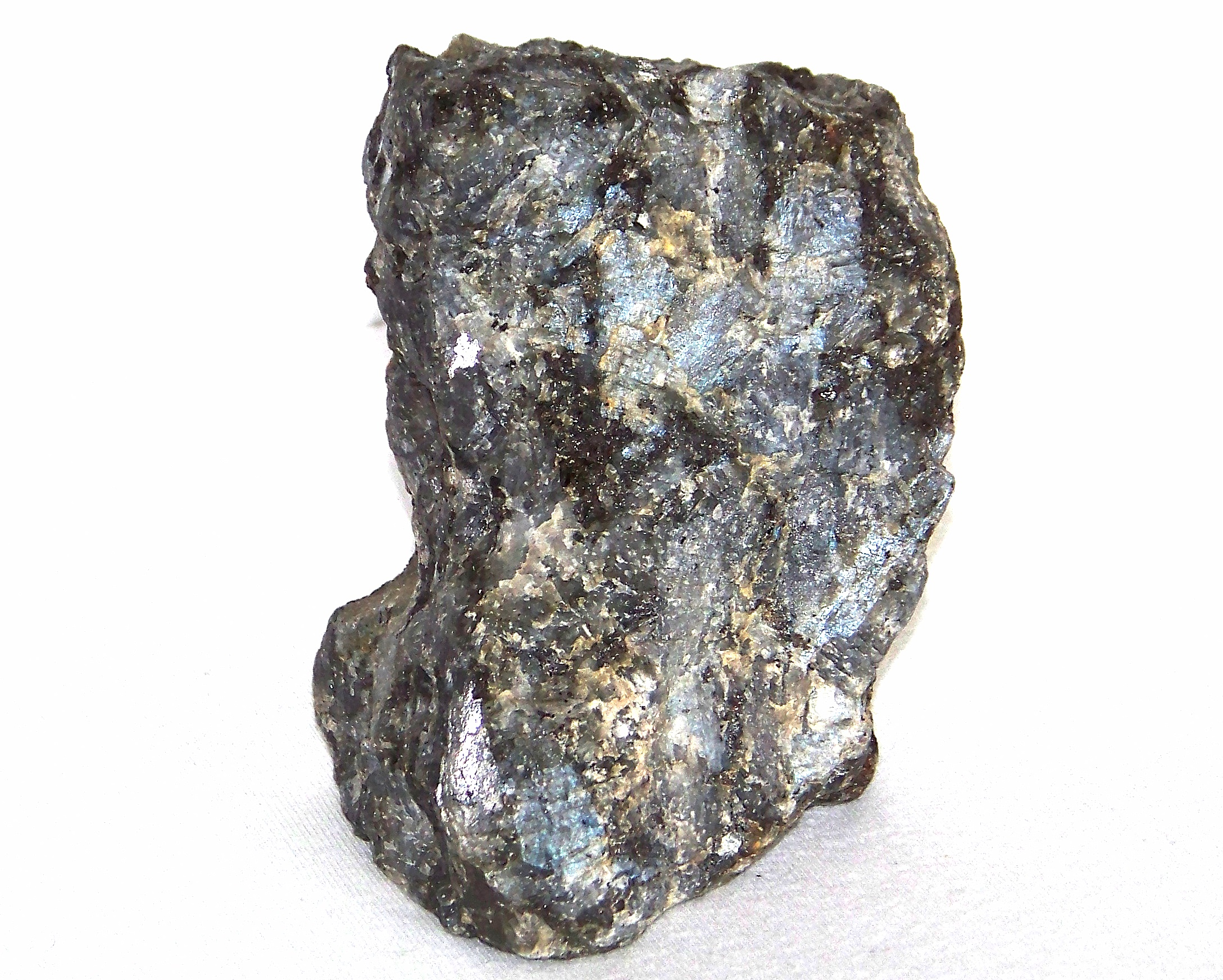
Anorthosite from Poland

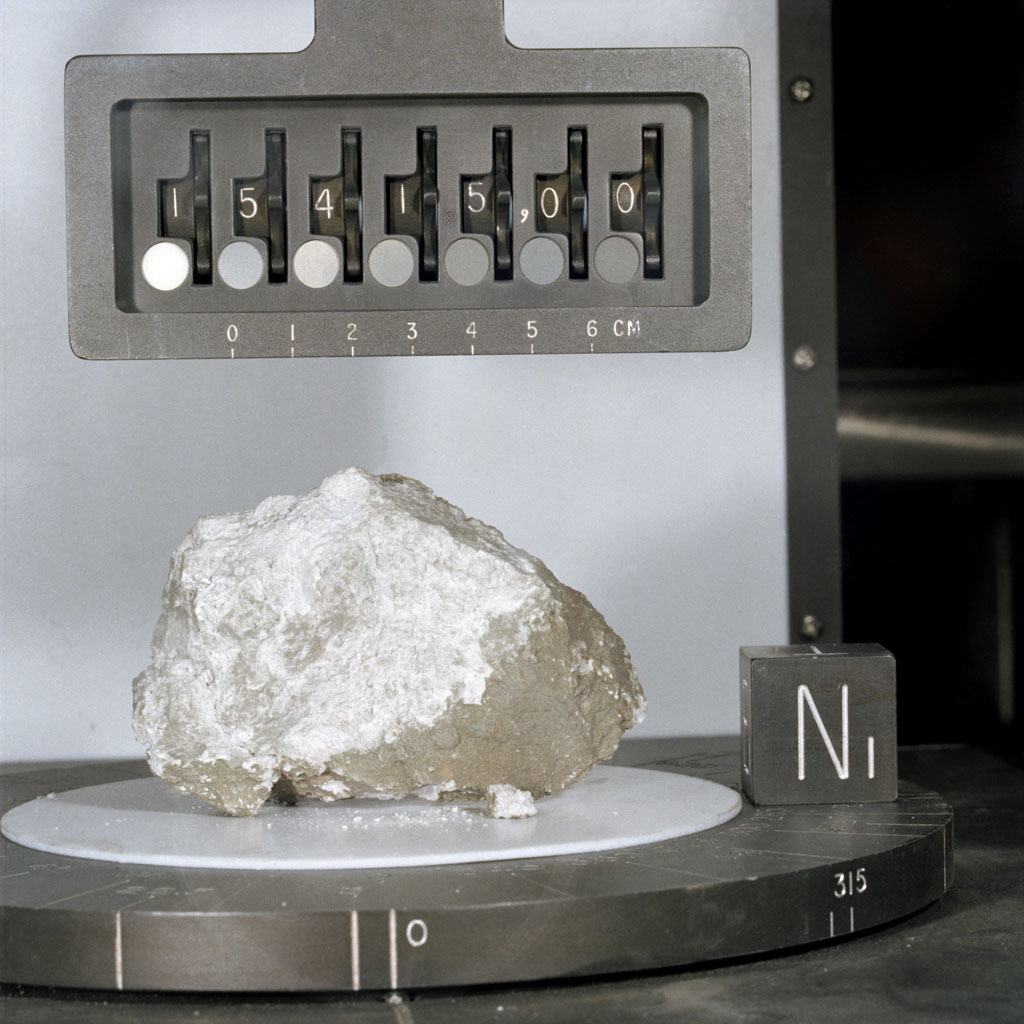
Anorthosite from the Moon, the Apollo 15 "Genesis Rock"

== See also ==
- List of rock types

== Bibliography ==
- Bédard, Jean H. (2001). "Parental magmas of the Nain Plutonic Suite anorthosites and mafic cumulates: a trace element modelling approach". Contributions to Mineralogy and Petrology. 141 (6): 747–771. Bibcode:2001CoMP..141..747B. doi:10.1007/s004100100268. S2CID 129715859.
- Emslie, R. F. (1 May 1975). "Pyroxene megacrysts from anorthositic rocks: new clues to the sources and evolution of the parent magmas". Canadian Mineralogist. 13 (2): 138–145. ISSN 0008-4476.
- Emslie, R. F.; Stirling, J. A. R. (1 December 1993). "Rapakivi and related granitoids of the Nain Plutonic Suite: geochemistry, mineral assemblages and fluid equilibria". Canadian Mineralogist. 31 (4): 821–847. ISSN 0008-4476.
- Emslie, R. F.; Hamilton, M. A.; Theriault, R. J. (1994). "Petrogenesis of a Mid-Proterozoic Anorthosite-Mangerite-Charnockite-Granite (AMCG) Complex: Isotopic and Chemical Evidence from the Nain Plutonic Suite". Journal of Geology. 102 (5): 539–558. Bibcode:1994JG....102..539E. doi:10.1086/629697. S2CID 128409707.
- Longhi, John; Fram, M. S.; Vander Auwera, J.; Montieth, J. N. (1 October 1993). "Pressure effects, kinetics, and rheology of anorthositic and related magmas". American Mineralogist. 78 (9–10): 1016–1030.
- Norman, M. D.; Borg, L. E.; Nyquist, L. E.; Bogard, D. D. (2003). "Chronology, geochemistry, and petrology of a ferroan noritic anorthosite clast from Descartes breccia 67215: Clues to the age, origin, structure, and impact history of the lunar crust". Meteoritics and Planetary Science. 38 (4): 645–661. Bibcode:2003M&PS...38..645N. doi:10.1111/j.1945-5100.2003.tb00031.x.
- Wood, J. A.; Dickey, J. S. Jr.; Marvin, U. B.; Powell, B. N. (1970). "Lunar Anorthosites". Science. 167 (3918): 602–604. Bibcode:1970Sci...167..602W. doi:10.1126/science.167.3918.602. PMID 17781512. S2CID 20153077.
- Xue, S.; Morse, S. A. (1993). "Geochemistry of the Nain massif anorthosite, Labrador: Magma diversity in five intrusions". Geochimica et Cosmochimica Acta. 57 (16): 3925–3948. Bibcode:1993GeCoA..57.3925X. doi:10.1016/0016-7037(93)90344-V.
- Xue, S.; Morse, S. A. (1994). "Chemical characteristics of plagioclase and pyroxene megacrysts and their significance to the petrogenesis of the Nain Anorthosites". Geochimica et Cosmochimica Acta. 58 (20): 4317–4331. Bibcode:1994GeCoA..58.4317X. doi:10.1016/0016-7037(94)90336-0.
