= KREEP =

Geochemical component of some lunar rocks, potassium, lanthanides, and phosphorus

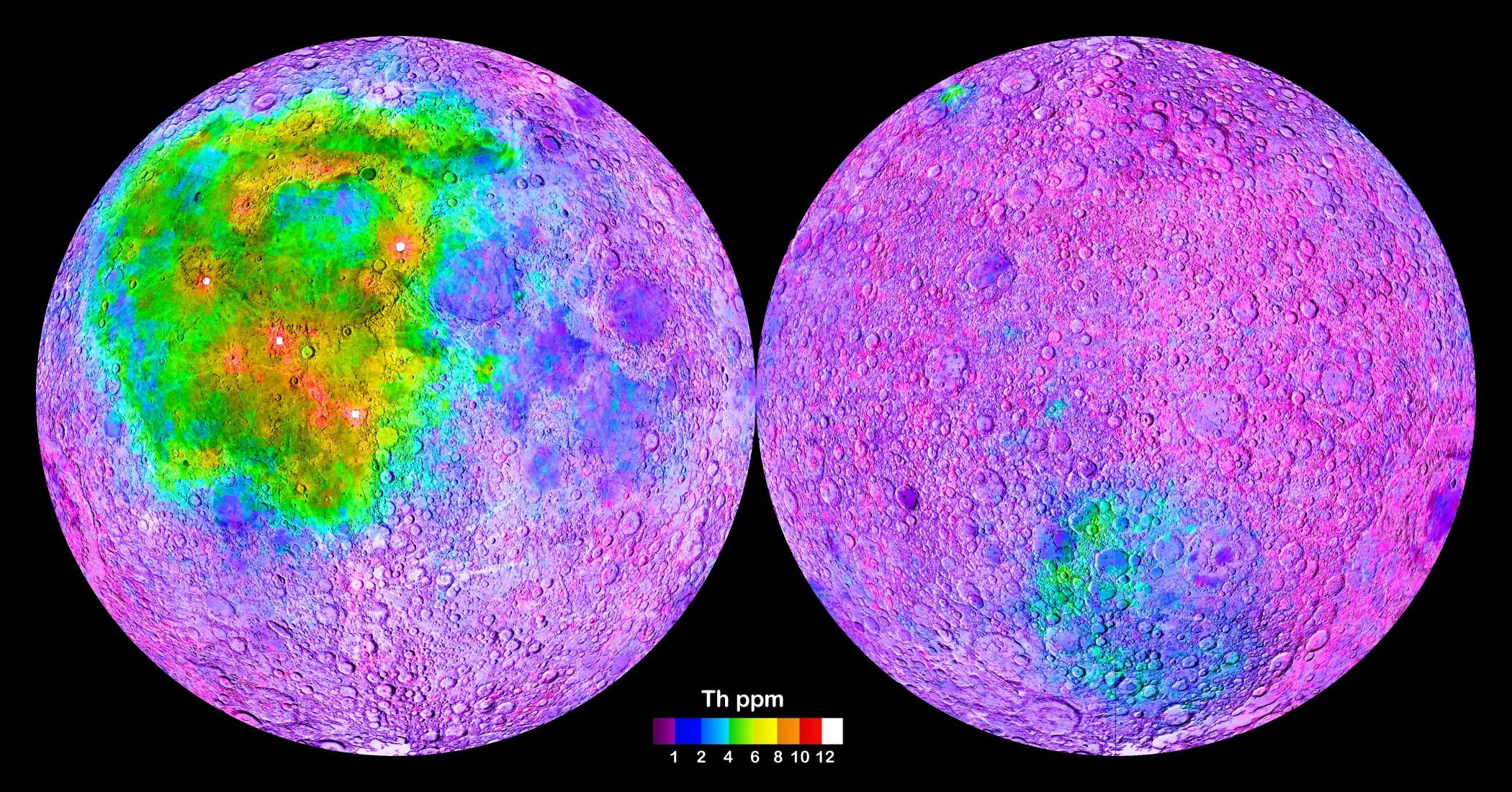
Thorium concentrations on the Moon, as mapped by Lunar Prospector. Thorium correlates with the location of KREEP.

KREEP, an acronym built from the letters K (the atomic symbol for potassium), REE (rare-earth elements) and P (for phosphorus), is a geochemical component of some lunar impact breccia and basaltic rocks. Its most significant feature is somewhat enhanced concentration of a majority of so-called "incompatible" elements (those that are concentrated in the liquid phase during magma crystallization) and the heat-producing elements, namely radioactive uranium, thorium, and potassium (due to presence of the radioactive ^{40}K).

== Typical composition ==
The typical composition of KREEP includes about one percent, by mass, of potassium and phosphorus oxides, 20 to 25 parts per million of rubidium, and a concentration of the element lanthanum that is 300 to 350 times the concentrations found in carbonaceous chondrites. Most of potassium, phosphorus and rare-earth elements in KREEP basalts are incorporated in the grains of the phosphate minerals apatite and merrillite.

== Possible origin ==
Indirectly, it has been deduced that the origin of KREEP is contained in the origin of the Moon. This is now commonly thought to be the result of a rocky planet the size of Mars that struck the Earth about 4.5 billion (4.5 billion) years ago. This collision threw a large amount of broken rock into orbit around the Earth. This ultimately gathered together to form the Moon.

Given the high energy such a collision would involve, it has been deduced that a large portion of the Moon would have been liquified, and this formed a lunar magma ocean. As the crystallization of this liquid rock proceeded, minerals such as olivine and pyroxene precipitated and sank to the bottom to form the lunar mantle.

After the solidification was about 75% complete, the material anorthositic plagioclase began to crystallize, and because of its low density, it floated, forming a solid crust. Hence, elements that are usually incompatible (i.e., those that usually partition in the liquid phase) would have been progressively concentrated into the magma. Thus a KREEP-rich magma was formed that was sandwiched at first between the crust and mantle. The evidence for these processes comes from the highly anorthositic composition of the crust of the lunar highlands, as well as the presence of the rocks rich in KREEP.

== Lunar Prospector measurements ==
Before the mission of Lunar Prospector lunar satellite, it was commonly thought that these KREEP materials had been formed in a widespread layer beneath the crust. However, the measurements from the gamma-ray spectrometer on-board this satellite showed that the KREEP-containing rocks are primarily concentrated underneath the Oceanus Procellarum and the Mare Imbrium. This is a unique lunar geological province that is now known as the Procellarum KREEP Terrane.

Basins far from this province that dug deeply into the crust (and possibly the mantle), such as the Mare Crisium, the Mare Orientale, and the South Pole–Aitken basin, show only little or no enhancements of KREEP within their rims or ejecta. The enhancement of heat-producing radioactive elements within the crust (and/or the mantle) of the Procellarum KREEP Terrane is almost certainly responsible for the longevity and intensity of mare volcanism on the nearside of the Moon.

== Possible use in lunar colonization ==
KREEP might be of interest in lunar mining if a lunar base were to be established. Potassium and phosphorus are important for plant growth (NPK fertilizer is used on earth) whereas uranium and thorium are potential fuels for nuclear power. However, the relatively low concentrations of the desired materials compared to earthbound ores may make extraction difficult.

== See also ==
- Geology of the Moon
- Lunar mare
- Lunar Prospector
- Moon
- Lunar resources
