= Lunar magma ocean =

Theorized historical geological layer on the Moon

Animation showing the cross-section of the LMO as it crystallizes over time. The first solids to form (e.g., olivine) are denser than the surrounding magma, thus sink towards the interior. After about 80% of the LMO has crystallized, less dense solids (i.e., plagioclase) begin to form and float towards the surface, forming the primordial crust of the Moon.

The Lunar Magma Ocean (LMO) is the layer of molten rock that is theorized to have been present on the surface of the Moon. The LMO was likely present on the Moon from the time of the Moon's formation (about 4.5 or 4.4 billion years ago) to tens or hundreds of millions of years after that time. The LMO was a thermodynamic consequence of the Moon's relatively rapid formation in the aftermath of a giant impact between the proto-Earth and another planetary body. As the Moon accreted from the debris from the giant impact, gravitational potential energy was converted to thermal energy. Due to the rapid accretion of the Moon (in about a month to a year), thermal energy was trapped since it did not have sufficient time to thermally radiate away energy through the lunar surface. The subsequent thermochemical evolution of the LMO explains the Moon's largely anorthositic crust, europium anomaly, and KREEP material.

The LMO was initially proposed by two groups in 1970 after they analyzed anorthositic rock fragments found in the Apollo 11 sample collection. Wood et al. used fragments of bulk sample 10085 for their analyses. Ferroan anorthosite (FAN) rocks found during the Apollo program are composed primarily (over 90%) of the mineral plagioclase. More specifically, FAN rocks found on the Moon consist of the calcium (Ca) end-member of plagioclase (i.e., anorthite). This suggests that at least upper layers of the Moon were molten in the past due to the purity of lunar anorthosites and the fact that anorthite generally has a high crystallization temperature.

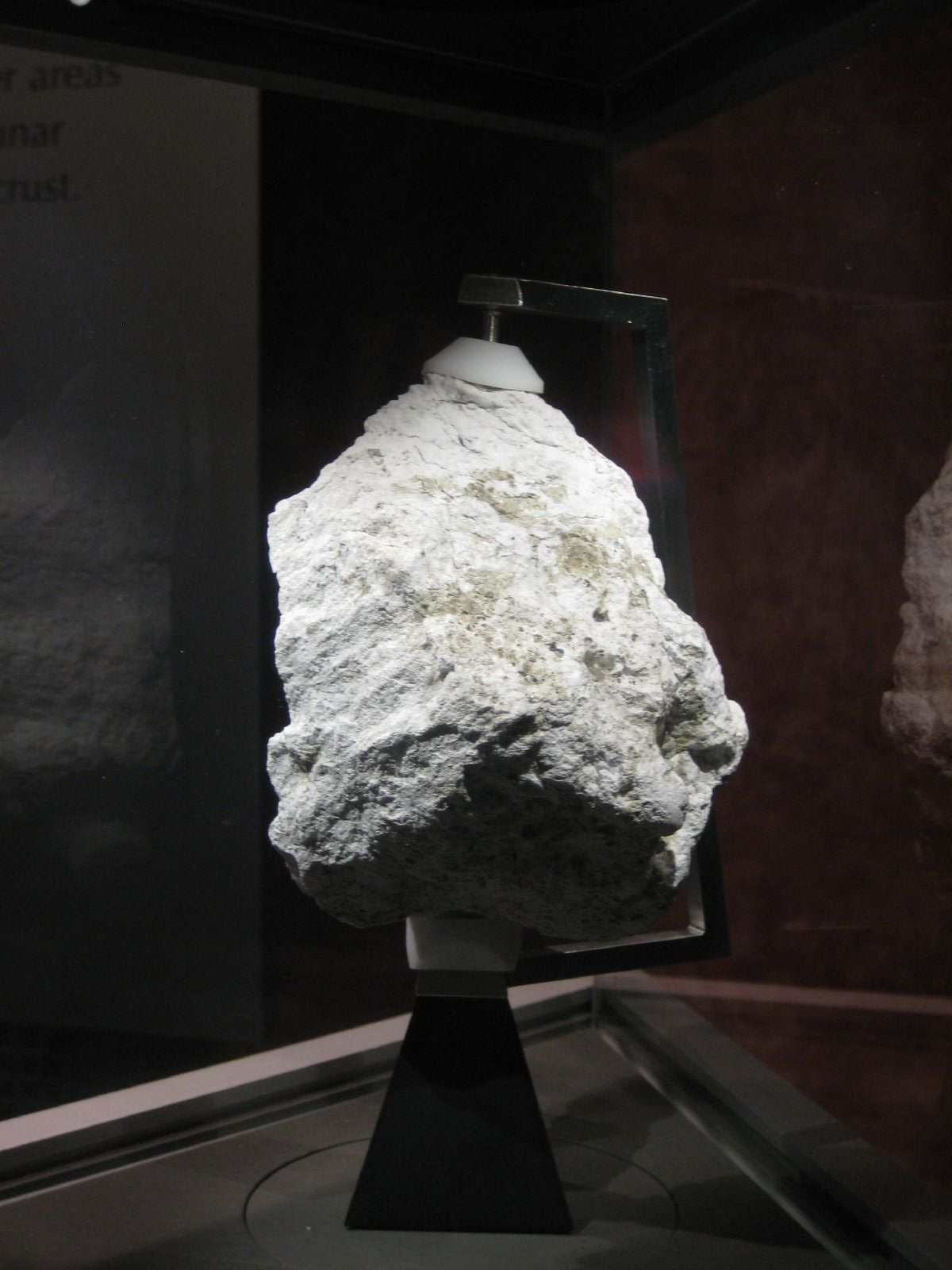
Lunar FAN rock from Apollo 16 (Sample 60025).

== Initial state ==
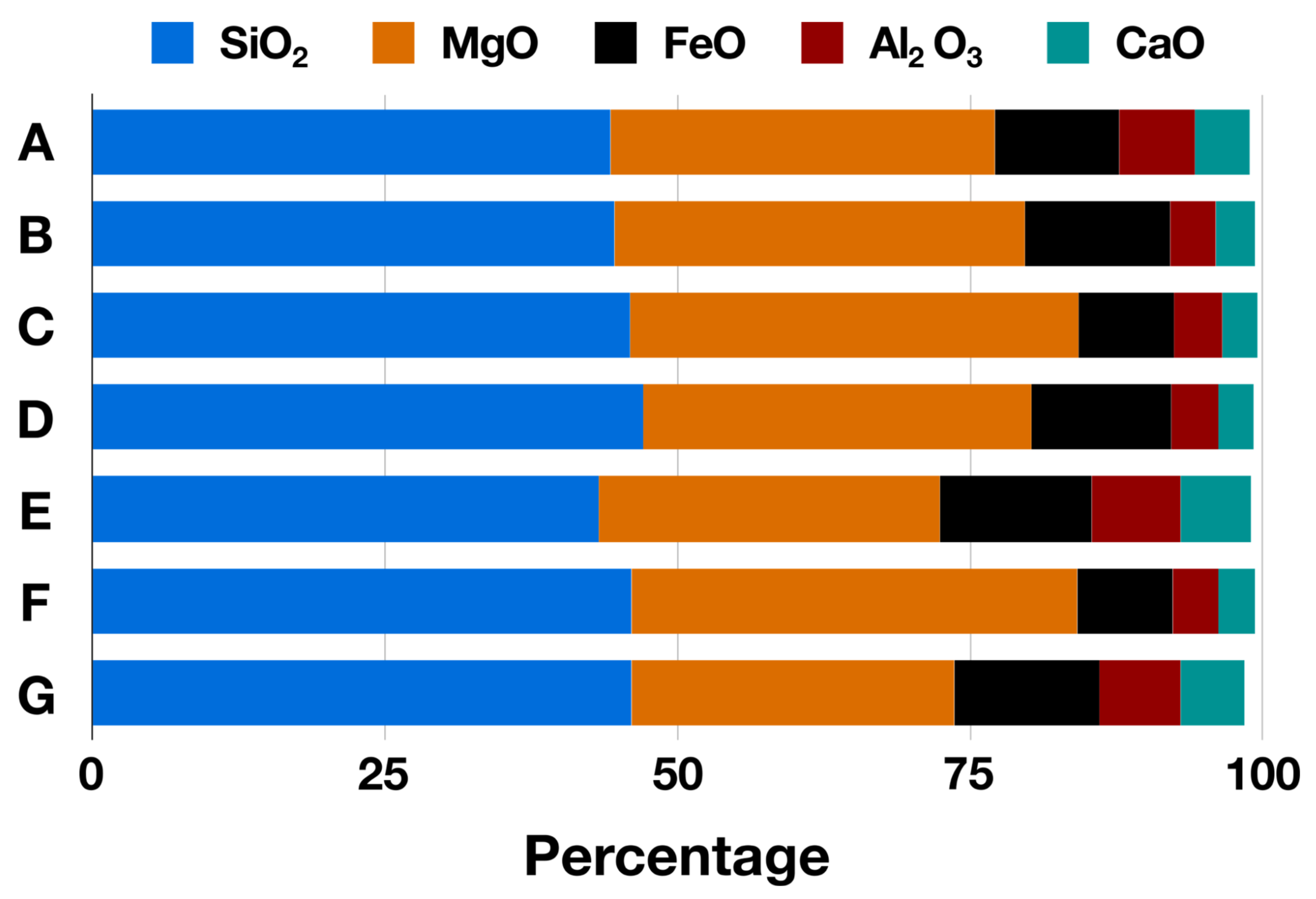
Seven published estimates (A-G) of the initial LMO chemical composition shown by weight percent. Minor components such as TiO_{2} & Cr_{2}O_{3} are not shown. [A] Taylor Whole Moon from Taylor (1982) as modified in Elardo et al. (2011). [B] O'Neill (1991) as modified in Schwinger and Breuer (2018). [C] Lunar Primitive Upper Mantle from Longhi (2006) as modified in Elardo et al. (2011). [D] Elkins-Tanton et al. (2011). [E] Morgan et al. (1978). [F] Ringwood and Kesson (1976). [G] Warren (1986).

There are three important parameters when considering the initial state of the LMO: chemical composition, depth, and temperature. These three parameters largely determine the thermochemical evolution. For the LMO, there are uncertainties associated with each of these initial conditions. A typical initial chemical composition is 47.1% SiO_{2}, 33.1% MgO, 12.0% FeO, 4.0% Al_{2}O_{3}, and 3.0% CaO (with minor contributions from other molecules), along with an initial depth of 1,000 km and a basal temperature of 1,900 K.

=== Initial chemical composition and depth ===
Initial chemical composition of the LMO is estimated based on the chemistry of lunar samples, along with the chemical composition and thickness of the current lunar crust. For computer modeling purposes, the initial chemical composition is typically defined by weight percent based on a system of basic molecules such as SiO_{2}, MgO, FeO, Al_{2}O_{3}, and CaO. Seven example initial chemical compositions of the LMO from the literature are shown in the figure to the right. These compositions are generally similar to the composition of the Earth's mantle with the main difference being some (e.g., Taylor Whole Moon) or no enhancement (e.g., Lunar Primitive Upper Mantle) of refractory elements.

The estimated initial depth of the LMO varies from 100 km to the radius of the Moon.

== Crystallization sequence ==
The exact sequence of minerals that crystallize out of the LMO depends on its initial state (viz. chemical composition, depth, and temperature). Following the idealized Bowen's Reaction Series, olivine is generally expected to crystallize first, followed by orthopyroxene. These minerals are denser than the surrounding magma and thus sink as cumulates to the bottom of the LMO. As such, the LMO is initially expected to solidify from the bottom up. After about 80% of the LMO has crystallized, the mineral plagioclase crystallizes along with other minerals. Lunar rocks that are primarily made of plagioclase (i.e., anorthosite) form and float towards the surface of the Moon, making its primordial crust. The remaining dregs of melt situated between the mantle and anorthositic crust is enriched in incompatible (melt-favoring) elements such as K (potassium), REE (Rare-Earth Elements), and P (phosphorus), which solidified to form what is known as the urKREEP layer.

== Duration ==
The LMO may have lasted tens to hundreds of millions of years after the Moon's formation. The Moon is estimated to have formed between 52 and 152 million years after calcium-aluminum-rich inclusions (CAIs), the oldest known solids in the Solar System that serve as a proxy for its age of 4.567Ga. The exact formation time of the LMO is somewhat uncertain.

End points may be indicated by the age of FAN sample 60025 (4.360±0.003 Ga) and the estimated age of ur-KREEP (4.368±0.029 Ga). If the Moon formed early (i.e., 52 million years after Solar System formation) and both samples indicate full LMO crystallization, then the LMO would have lasted for about 155 million years. In this case, computer models show that one or more heat sources (such as tidal heating) are required to prolong crystallization of the LMO.

If the Moon formed late (i.e., 152 million years after Solar System formation) then again using the FAN sample 60025's age and the estimated age of ur-KREEP, the LMO lasted for about 55 million years. Meaning the LMO was not prolonged by one or more additional heat sources.

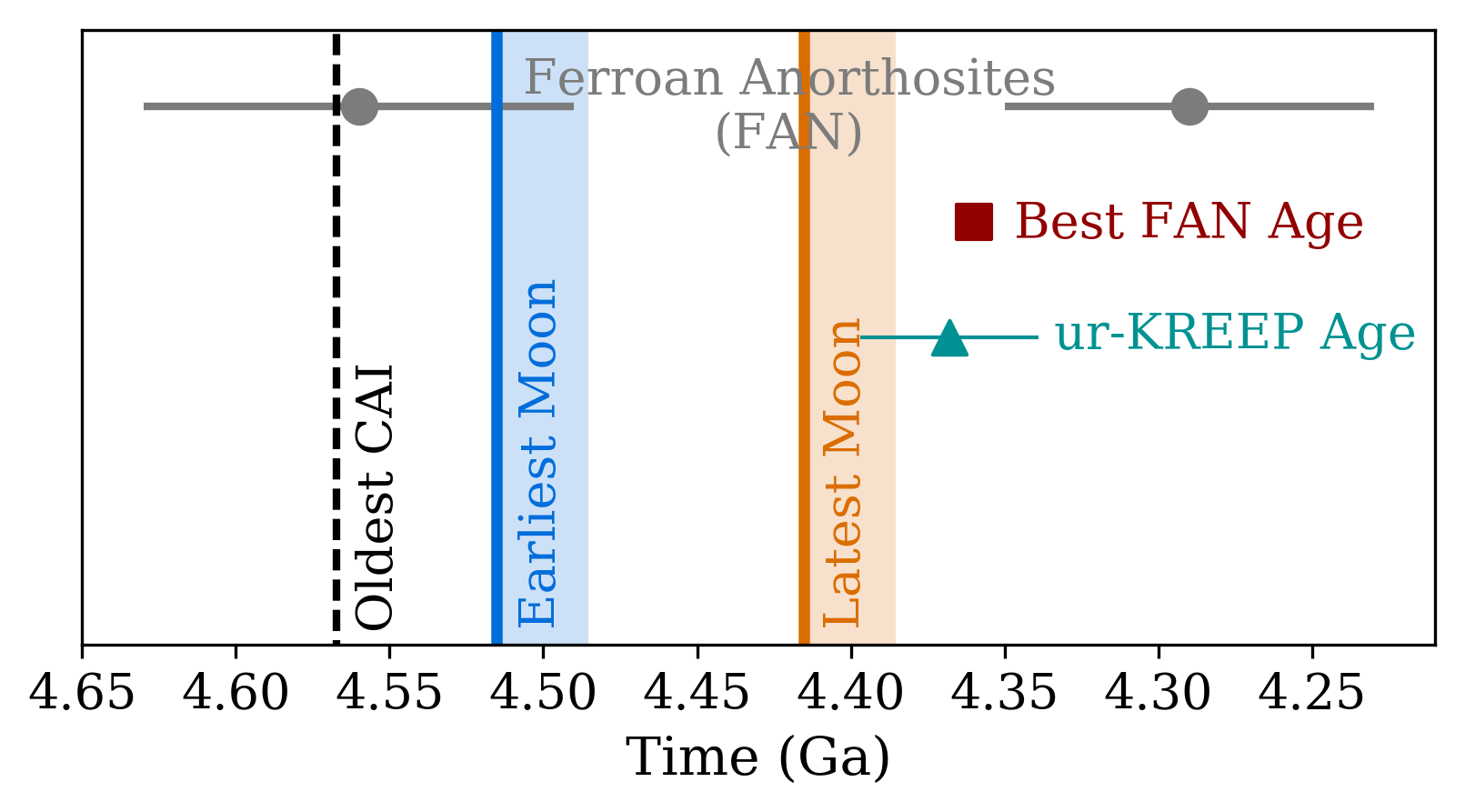
The most reliable FAN sample age is shown with a red square (error bars are smaller than the marker) and the best estimate for formation of the original KREEP layer at depth (i.e., ur-KREEP) is shown with a dark cyan triangle. Oldest and youngest FAN samples are shown by gray circles.

In the past, the age difference between the oldest and youngest FAN samples were used to determine the duration of the LMO. This was problematic due to the large errors of sample ages and due to some sample ages being reset by impacts. For instance, the oldest FAN sample is 67016 with a Sm-Nd age of 4.56±0.07 Ga and the youngest is 62236 with a Sm-Nd age of 4.29±0.06 Ga. The difference between these ages is 270 million years. This would again mean that the LMO had an additional heat source, such as tidal heating.

Zircon analysis of Apollo 14 samples suggests the lunar crust differentiated 4.51±0.01 billion years ago, indicating lunar formation 50 million years after the beginning of the Solar System.

== Alternative models ==
One of the alternative models to the LMO model is the Serial Magmatism model.
