= Volcanism on the Moon =

Volcanic processes and landforms on the Moon

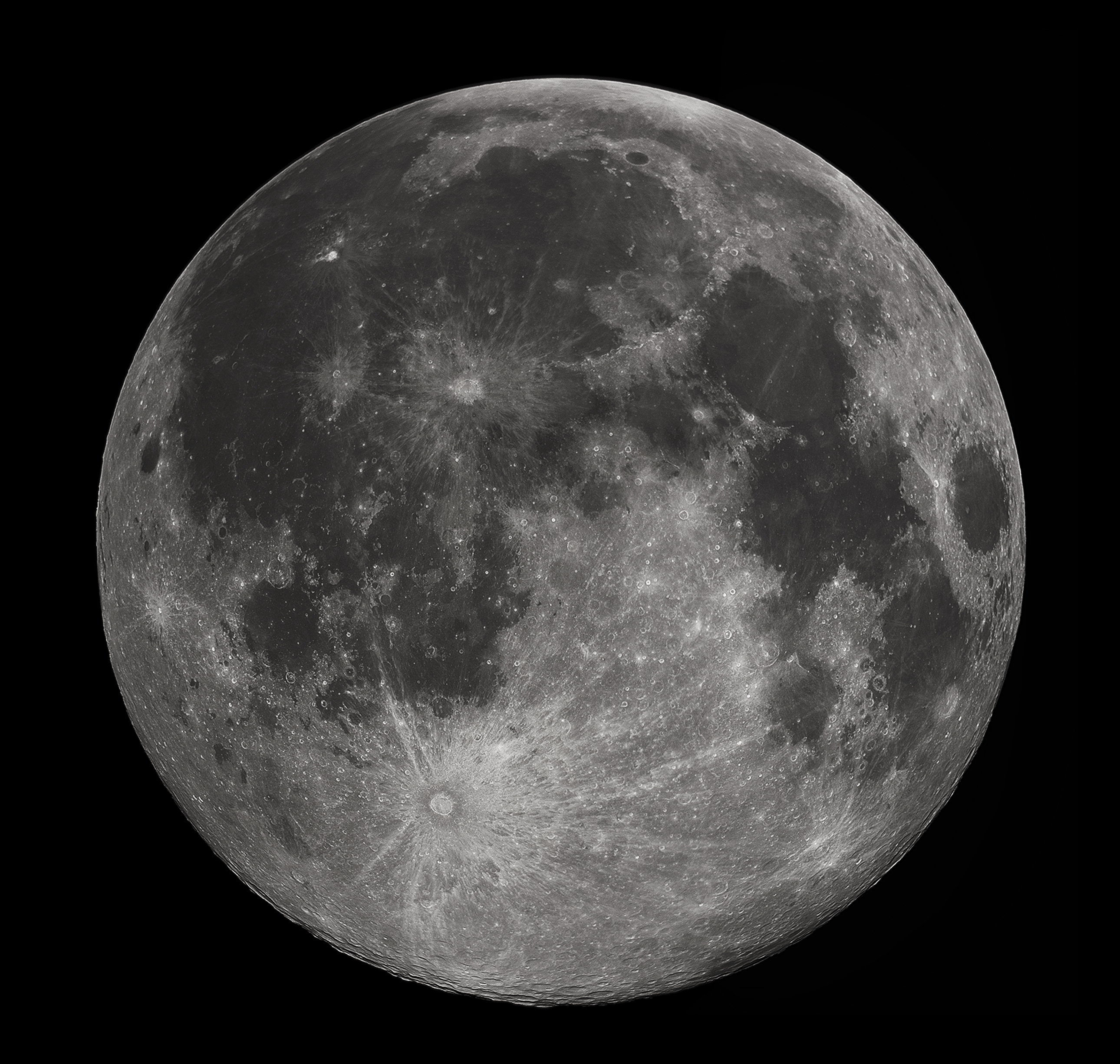
The dark and relatively featureless lunar plains, clearly seen with the naked eye, are vast solidified pools of ancient lava called maria.

Volcanism on the Moon is represented by the presence of volcanoes, pyroclastic deposits and vast lava plains on the lunar surface. The volcanoes are typically in the form of small domes and cones that form large volcanic complexes and isolated edifices. Calderas, large-scale collapse features generally formed late in a volcanic eruptive episode, are exceptionally rare on the Moon. Lunar pyroclastic deposits are the result of lava fountain eruptions from volatile-laden basaltic magmas rapidly ascending from deep mantle sources and erupting as a spray of magma, forming tiny glass beads. However, pyroclastic deposits formed by less common non-basaltic explosive eruptions are also thought to exist on the Moon. Lunar lava plains cover large swaths of the Moon's surface and consist mainly of voluminous basaltic flows. They contain a number of volcanic features related to the cooling of lava, including lava tubes, rilles and wrinkle ridges.

The Moon has been volcanically active throughout much of its history, with the first volcanic eruptions having occurred about 4.2 billion years ago, during the Aitkenian period. Volcanism was most intense from the Upper Imbrian epoch to the Eratosthenian period, between 3.8 and 3 billion years ago. In this period, much of the lunar lava plains were created. This activity was originally thought to have diminished about 1 billion years ago during the Copernician period, but more recent evidence suggests that smaller-scale volcanism may have occurred in the last 50 million years. Today, the Moon has no active volcanoes, even though a significant amount of magma may persist under the lunar surface.

== Early impressions ==
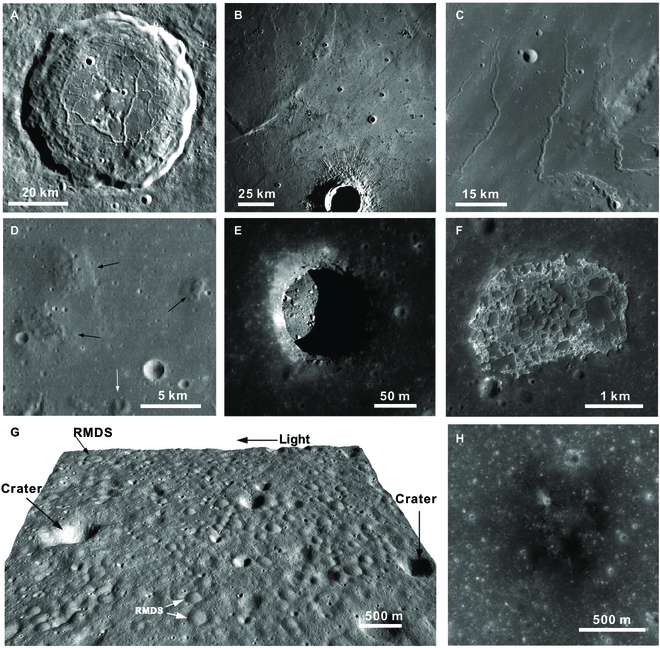
Volcanic lunar features: A) Floor-fractured crater; B) Lava flows; C) Sinuous rille; D) Lunar dome (black arrows) and cone (white arrow); E) Lunar skylight; F) Irregular mare patch; G) 3D view of ring moat dome structures; H) Pyroclastic deposits

In 1604, German astronomer Johannes Kepler studied the moon and mistakenly thought that the lunar spots were seas. In Dioptrice, he called them maria, the Latin word for "seas". Italian astronomer Galileo Galilei saw the spots through an early telescope and confirmed the earth-like composition of the Moon in his Sidereus Nuncius (1610). Kepler changed his mind on the composition of the Moon after reading Galileo's account. In 1665, British chemist Robert Hooke was the first to suggest that the bowl-shaped depressions on the Moon were volcanoes. This idea was supported by their resemblance to the craters in the Phlegraean Fields of Italy, though the lunar ones are much larger. French astronomer Pierre Puiseux later proposed that the Moon’s craters were collapsed volcanic domes that had released all their gases. In the 18th century, another French astronomer, Pierre-Simon Laplace, suggested that meteorites were volcanic projectiles thrown out during major lunar eruptions.

The origin of lunar craters remained controversial throughout the first half of the 20th century, with volcano supporters arguing that bright rays fanning out of some craters were streaks of volcanic ash similar to those found at Mount Aso in Japan. Astronomers also reported flashes of light and red clouds over the Alphonsus and Aristarchus craters. Evidence collected during the Apollo program (1961–1972) and from uncrewed spacecraft of the same period proved conclusively that meteoric impact, or impact by asteroids for larger craters, was the origin of almost all lunar craters, and by implication, most craters on other bodies as well. It was initially believed that meteorite impacts could not be responsible for circular craters and that they must have all been due to volcanic activity, as meteorites would create elliptic craters when impacting at an angle. However, research has shown that meteorites would have sufficient energy to cause a circular explosion upon impact, causing circular craters, unless they were to hit at an extraordinarily small angle to the horizontal.

== Features ==
After impact cratering, volcanism is the most dominant process that has modified the lunar crust. Much of this modification has been preserved due to the lack of plate tectonics on the Moon, such that the lunar surface has changed insignificantly throughout the Moon's geological history. Lunar volcanism has mostly been confined to the near side of the Moon where basaltic lava plains are the dominant volcanic feature. In contrast, positive topographic features such as domes, cones and shields represent only a tiny fraction of the lunar volcanic record. Volcanoes and lava plains have been found on both sides of the Moon.

=== Lava plains ===
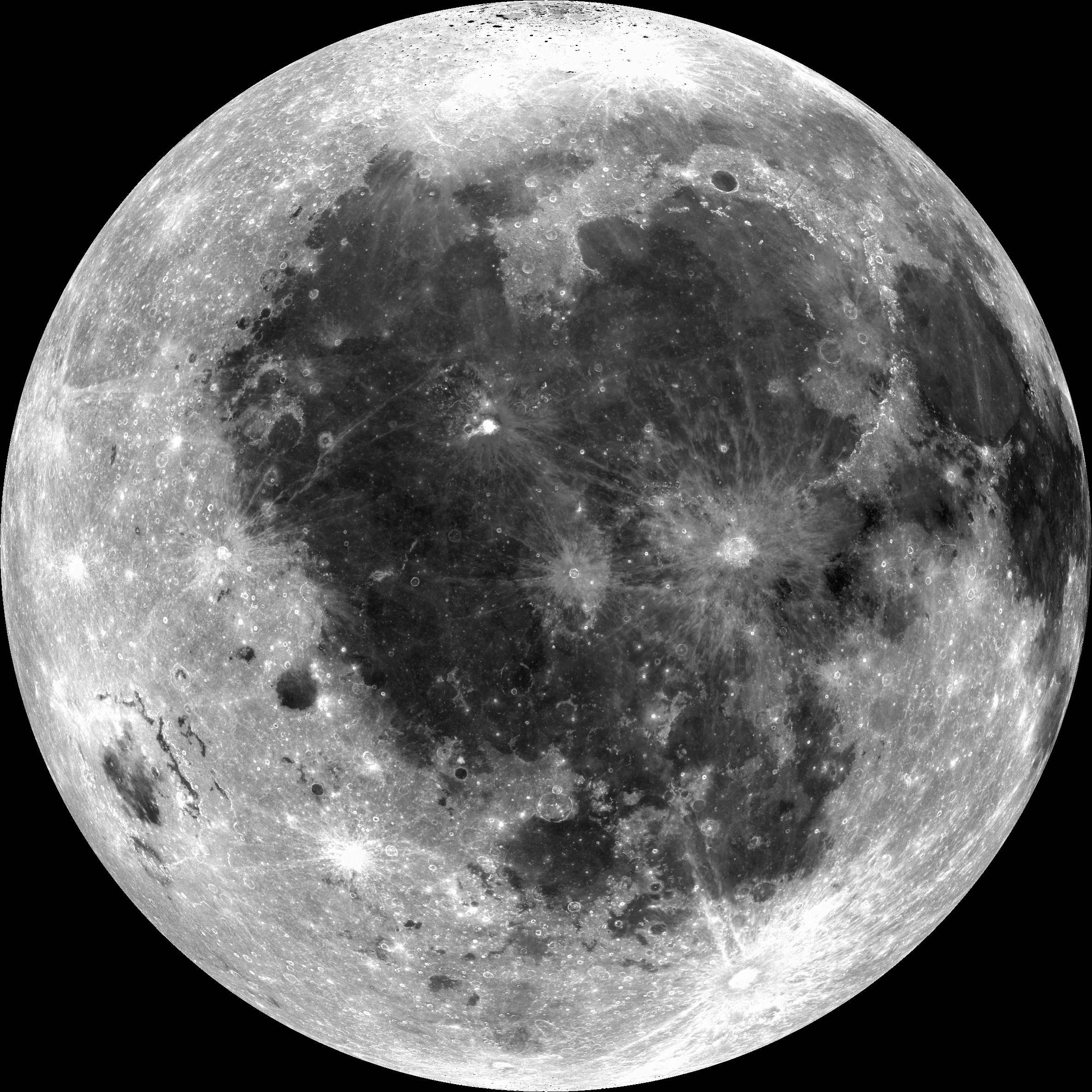
Most of the dark region is Oceanus Procellarum and smaller mare, such as Imbrium and Serenitatis, that sit within its ring. Left of the centerline is Procellarum proper.

The lunar maria are large basaltic plains that cover more than 15% of the Moon's surface. They are the most obvious volcanic features on the Moon, appearing as dark topographic features when seen with the naked eye. Many tend to cover the floors of large impact basins and are therefore typically circular in outline, with some smaller maria filling the bottoms of impact craters. The major lunar maria range in size from more than 200 km (120 mi) to about 1,400 km (870 mi) and are outclassed only by the larger Oceanus Procellarum, which has a diameter of roughly 2,590 km (1,610 mi). They typically range in thickness from about 500 to 1,500 m (1,600 to 4,900 ft), with individual lava flows ranging from 10 to 20 m (33 to 66 ft) thick. This suggests that each mare is the product of several overlapping eruptive events.

The ages of the mare basalts have been determined both by direct radiometric dating and by the technique of crater counting. The radiometric ages range from about 3.16 to 4.2 billion years, whereas the youngest ages determined from crater counting are about 1.2 billion years, in the latter part of the Eratosthenian period. Nevertheless, the majority of mare basalts appear to have erupted between about 3 and 3.5 billion years ago. The few basaltic eruptions that occurred on the far side of the Moon are old, whereas the youngest flows are found within Oceanus Procellarum on the near side. While many of the basalts either erupted within, or flowed into, low-lying impact basins, the largest expanse of volcanic units, Oceanus Procellarum, does not correspond to any known impact basin.

The reason that the mare basalts are predominantly located on the near-side hemisphere of the Moon is still being debated by the scientific community. Based on data obtained from the Lunar Prospector mission, it appears that a large proportion of the Moon's inventory of heat producing elements (in the form of KREEP) is located within the regions of Oceanus Procellarum and the Imbrium basin, a unique geochemical province now referred to as the Procellarum KREEP Terrane. While the enhancement in heat production within the Procellarum KREEP Terrane is most certainly related to the longevity and intensity of volcanism found there, the mechanism by which KREEP became concentrated within this region is not agreed upon.

==== Examples ====
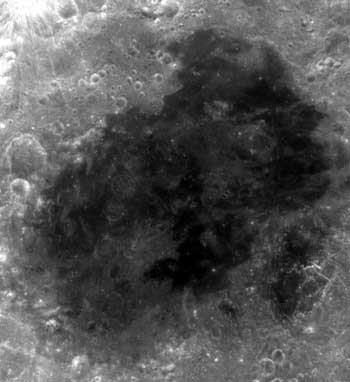
Mare Moscoviense

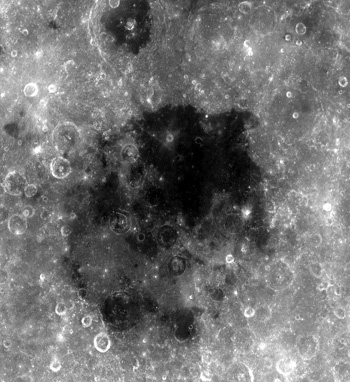
Mare Smythii

| Latin Name | English name | Lat. | Long. | Diameter |
|---|---|---|---|---|
| Mare Australe | Southern Sea | 47.77° S | 91.99° E | 996.84 km (619.41 mi) |
| Mare Cognitum | Sea that has become known | 10.53° S | 22.31° W | 350.01 km (217.49 mi) |
| Mare Crisium | Sea of Crises | 16.18° N | 59.1° E | 555.92 km (345.43 mi) |
| Mare Fecunditatis | Sea of Fecundity | 7.83° S | 53.67° E | 840.35 km (522.17 mi) |
| Mare Frigoris | Sea of Cold | 57.59° N | 0.01° E | 1,446.41 km (898.76 mi) |
| Mare Humboldtianum | Sea of Alexander von Humboldt | 56.92° N | 81.54° E | 230.78 km (143.40 mi) |
| Mare Humorum | Sea of Moisture | 24.48° S | 38.57° W | 419.67 km (260.77 mi) |
| Mare Imbrium | Sea of Showers | 34.72° N | 14.91° W | 1,145.53 km (711.80 mi) |
| Mare Ingenii | Sea of Cleverness | 33.25° S | 164.83° E | 282.2 km (175.4 mi) |
| Mare Marginis | Sea of the Edge | 12.7° N | 86.52° E | 357.63 km (222.22 mi) |
| Mare Moscoviense | Sea of Muscovy | 27.28° N | 148.12° E | 275.57 km (171.23 mi) |
| Mare Nectaris | Sea of Nectar | 15.19° S | 34.6° E | 339.39 km (210.89 mi) |
| Mare Nubium | Sea of Clouds | 20.59° S | 17.29° W | 714.5 km (444.0 mi) |
| Mare Orientale | Eastern Sea | 19.87° S | 94.67° W | 294.16 km (182.78 mi) |
| Mare Serenitatis | Sea of Serenity | 27.29° N | 18.36° E | 674.28 km (418.98 mi) |
| Mare Smythii | Smyth's Sea | 1.71° N | 87.05° E | 373.97 km (232.37 mi) |
| Mare Tranquillitatis | Sea of Tranquility | 8.35° N | 30.83° E | 875.75 km (544.17 mi) |
| Mare Vaporum | Sea of Vapors | 13.2° N | 4.09° E | 242.46 km (150.66 mi) |

=== Volcanoes ===
A number of domes and cones are present on the Moon, but such features likely formed differently than those on Earth. Because gravity on the Moon is only one sixth of that on Earth, lunar volcanism is capable of throwing ejecta much further, leaving little to pile up near the vent. Instead of a volcanic cone, such lunar eruptions should form a broad, thin layer around the vent. On Earth, lava domes form from very viscous, pasty lavas. Basaltic lavas are more liquid and tend to form broad, flat lava flows. On the Moon, most of the domes and cones appear to be made of basalts. As a result, they are unlikely to have formed like Earth domes from thick, non-basaltic lavas. Instead, the lunar domes and cones may mark places where the erupted basalts were just barely molten.

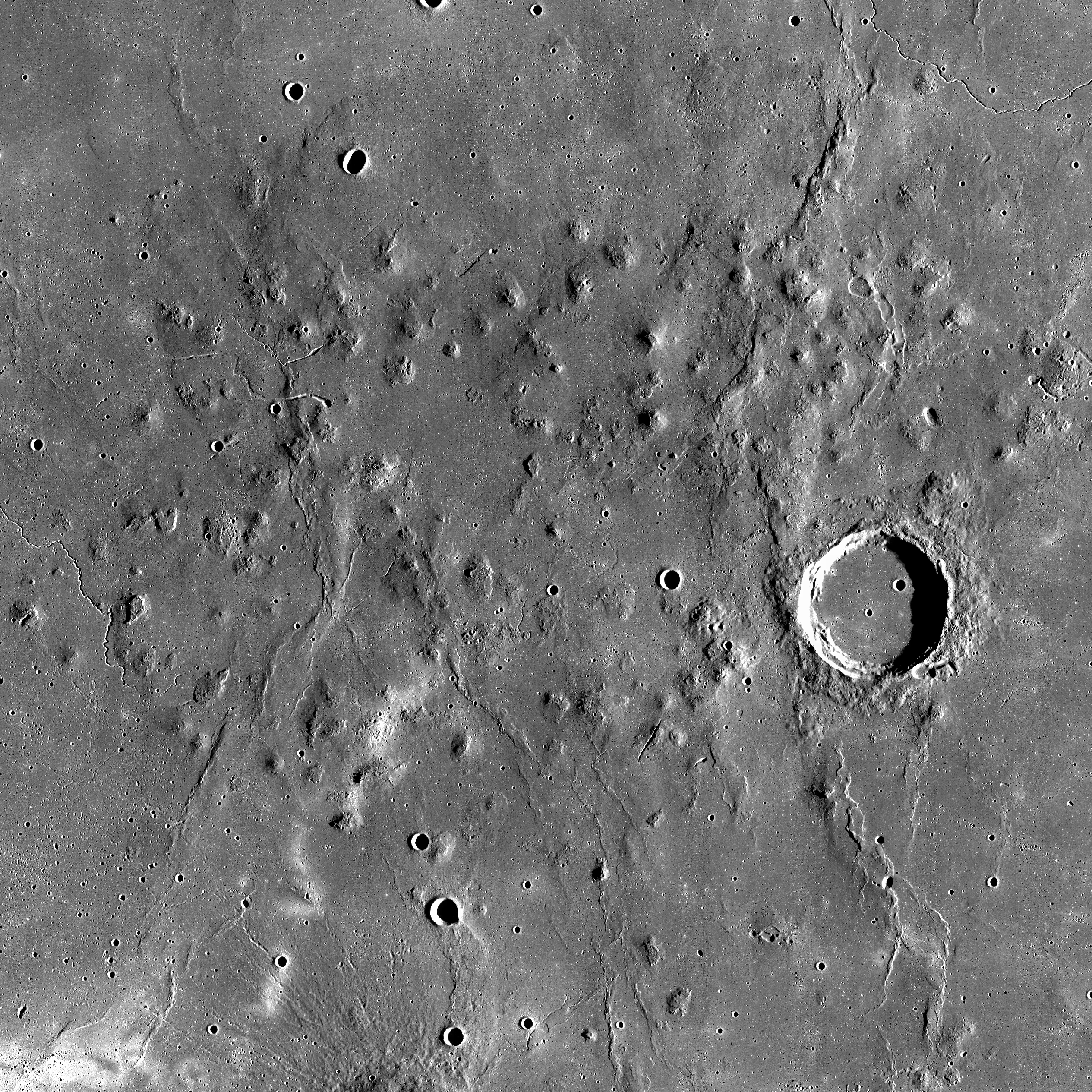
Overhead view of the Marius Hills

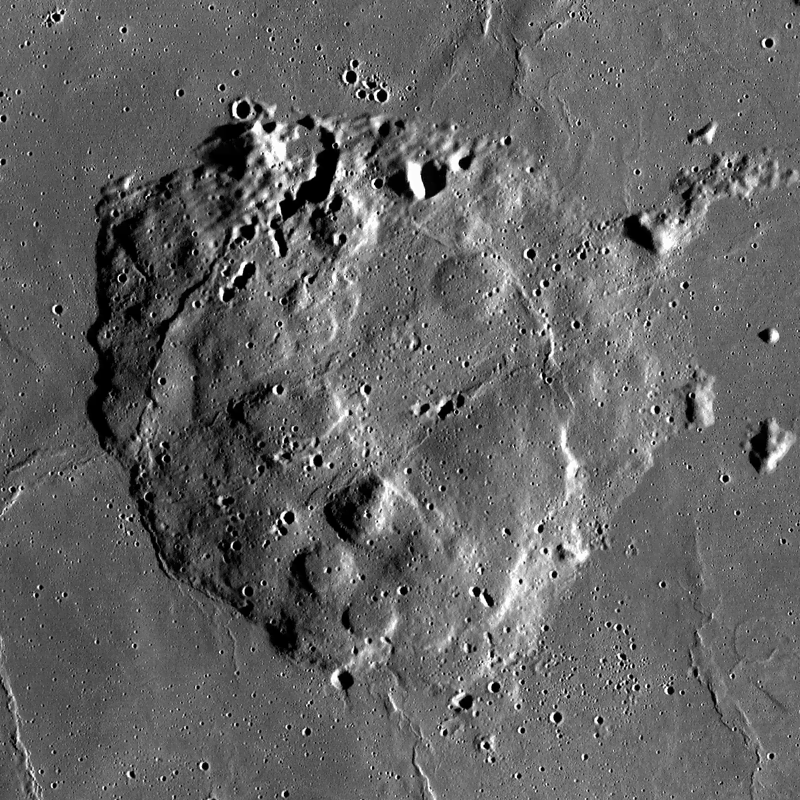
Mons Rümker, a volcanic complex in Oceanus Procellarum

Lunar domes are seldom found in isolation. Instead, they more commonly form in groups throughout the lunar lava plains. A prominent example are the Marius Hills, one of the largest volcanic complexes on the Moon. They consist of several cones and domes that occupy the summit of a broad topographic swell, which may be the lunar equivalent of a shield volcano. The complex rises 100 to 200 m (330 to 660 ft) from the surrounding plains and forms a 35,000 km^{2} (14,000 mi^{2}) lava plateau. A total of 59 cones and 262 domes ranging in diameter from 2 to 25 km (1.2 to 15.5 mi) have been identified.

Mons Rümker is a smaller complex similar in appearance to the Marius Hills. It comprises a plateau with an area of roughly 2,000 km^{2} (770 mi^{2}) and rises 200 to 1,300 m (660 to 4,270 ft) above the surrounding surface. Three main basalt units ranging in age from 3.51 to 3.71 billion years have been identified at Mons Rümker, although the youngest volcanic features may be steep-sided domes on the plateau surface as they show indications of having been active until the Eratosthenian. More than 20 domes overlie the plateau and are the most prominent volcanic landforms of Mons Rümker.

The Gruithuisen Domes in northwestern Mare Imbrium consist of two volcanic edifices: Mons Gruithuisen Gamma to the north and Mons Gruithuisen Delta to the south. They are situated on the rim of an impact crater and differ in color from the surrounding rocks. The domes may mark a rare instance of non-basaltic volcanism on the Moon. Mons Hansteen, a roughly triangular-shaped dome on the southern margin of Oceanus Procellerum, is another example of a rare non-basaltic lunar volcano. It consists of high-silica material that was erupted roughly 3.5 to 3.7 billion years ago from vents along northeast, northwest and southwest-trending fractures.

The Compton–Belkovich Volcanic Complex (CBVC) is a 25 km (16 mi) wide and 35 km (22 mi) long non-mare feature on the far side of the Moon. It differs from other lunar volcanic features due to its evolved lithology, regional tectonic setting, its location being near the north pole, far from the Procellarum KREEP Terrane and its recent association with endogenic water. In the middle of the CBVC lies an irregular-shaped depression bounded by fault scarps that is believed to be a caldera. Just to the west is a roughly 10 km (6.2 mi) wide and 18 km (11 mi) long feature called West Dome. A volcanic cone-like feature, called East Dome, lies near the eastern caldera margin. It has a more or less north–south trend, measuring 12 km (7.5 mi) long and 7 km (4.3 mi) wide. Just north of the caldera is a feature called Little Dome, 500 m (1,600 ft) in diameter. Further north is an elongated dome, oriented north–south, called Middle Dome. It is 2.5 km (1.6 mi) long and 0.6 km (0.37 mi) wide. Both Little Dome and Middle Dome have boulders on top that may be volcanic blocks. Big Dome, also known as North Dome, is further to the north at the edge of the CBVC. It is 2.5 km (1.6 mi) in diameter with a depression in the top. Small-crater size frequency distribution has given inconclusive results for the timing of CBVC volcanism, with ages ranging from less than 1 billion years to greater than 3 billion years.

=== Lava tubes ===
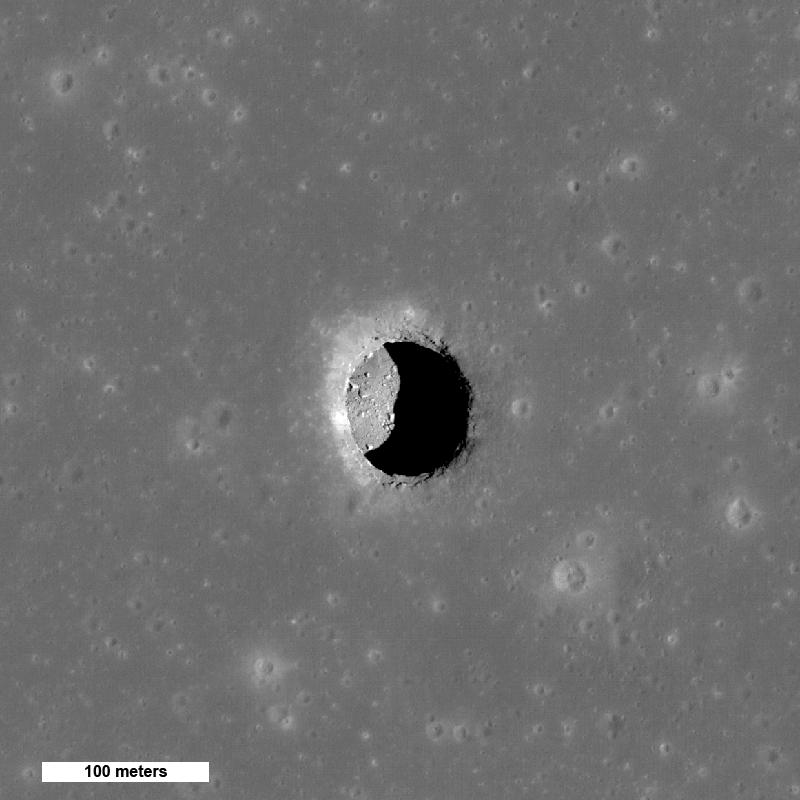
The Mare Tranquillitatis pit may be the partial collapse of a lunar lava tube

Although lava tubes have long been known to exist on Earth, it has only been relatively recently that they have been confirmed to also exist on the Moon. Their existence is sometimes revealed by the presence of a "skylight", a place in which the roof of the tube has collapsed, leaving a circular hole that can be observed by lunar orbiters. An area displaying a lava tube is the Marius Hills region. In 2008, an opening to a lava tube in this area may have been discovered by the Japanese Kaguya spacecraft. The skylight was photographed in more detail in 2011 by NASA's Lunar Reconnaissance Orbiter, showing both the 65-meter-wide pit and the floor of the pit about 36 m (118 ft) below. In 2023–2024, radar imaging of the Mare Tranquillitatis pit crater from NASA's Lunar Reconnaissance Orbiter was analyzed and determined to have been formed by the collapse of a lava tube that resulted in the formation of a cave conduit at least tens of meters long, proving the existence of lunar caves. There may also be lava tubes in the Mare Serenitatis.

Lunar lava tubes may potentially serve as enclosures for human habitats. Tunnels larger than 300 m (980 ft) in diameter may exist, lying under 40 m (130 ft) or more of basalt, with a stable temperature of −20 °C (−4 °F). These natural tunnels provide protection from cosmic radiation, solar radiation, meteorites, micrometeorites, and ejecta from impacts. They are insulated from the extreme temperature variations on the lunar surface and could provide a stable environment for inhabitants.

=== Pyroclastic deposits ===
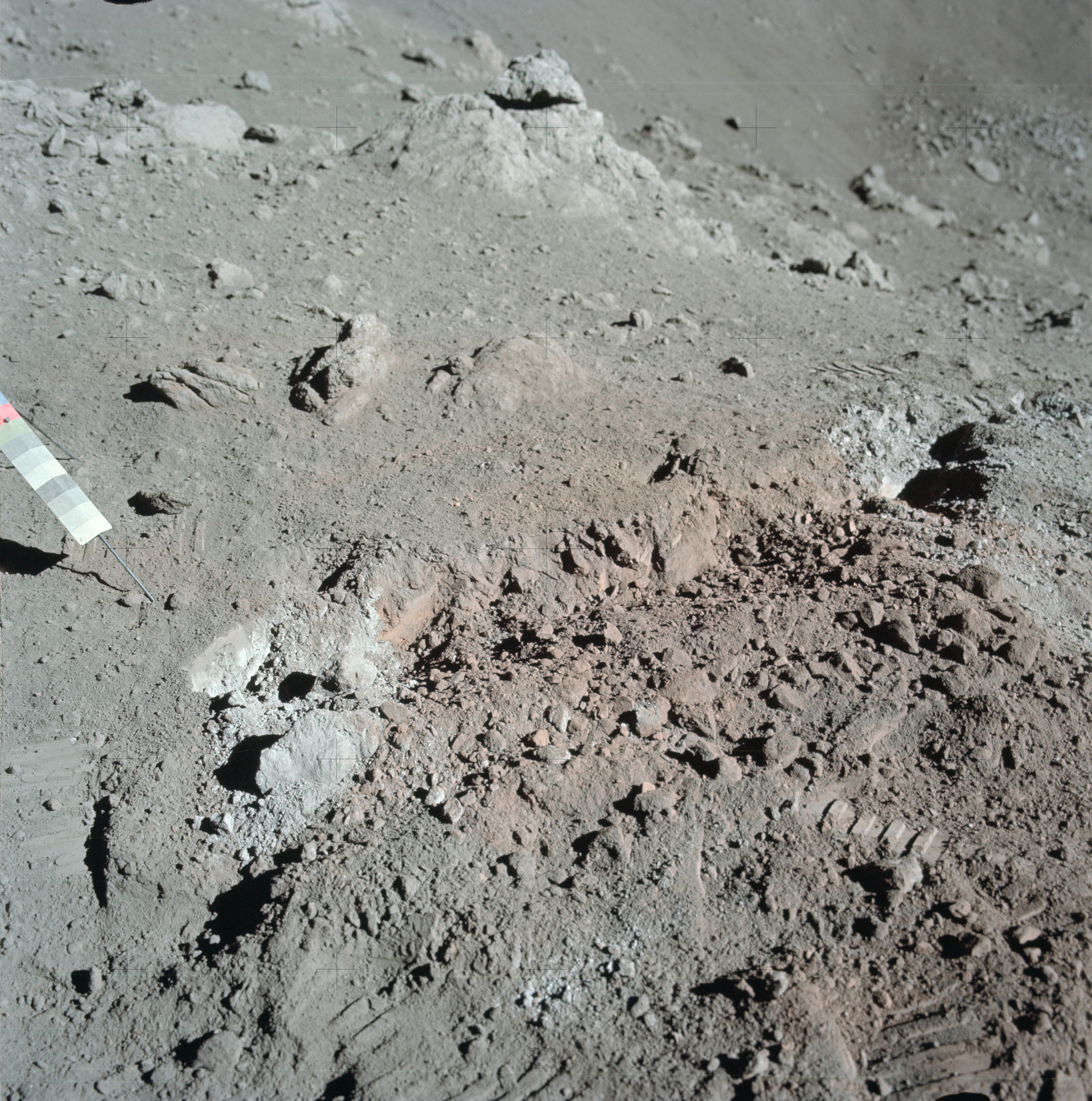
Orange Taurus–Littrow soil discovered on the Apollo 17 mission. The orange color is due to microscopic glass beads created by volcanic processes earlier in the Moon's history.

Near the edges of the lunar mare are dark layers of material that cover many thousands of square kilometers. They contain many small spheres of orange and black glass that probably formed from small drops of lava that cooled very quickly. Such droplets are believed to be ejecta from lava fountain eruptions that were larger than those on Earth. The largest known deposits occur at Taurus–Littrow, Sinus Aestuum, Sulpicius Gallus, Rima Bode, Mare Vaporum, Mare Humorum and the Aristarchus plateau in the central near side of the Moon.

Many smaller pyroclastic deposits measure only a few kilometers in diameter and are almost always located near the mare or in large impact crater floors, although several also lie along clear fault lines. They were likely produced by small volcanic explosions since most contain a small elongated or irregular-shaped central pit or crater. Examples are preserved along the crater floor edge of Alphonsus, an impact crater on the eastern edge of Mare Nubium.

Extending about 7 km (4.3 mi) east-southeast from the CBVC is a highly reflective area that may be a pyroclastic flow deposit. Its reflectivity is stronger in the 7.1 to 7 μm (0.00028 to 0.00028 in) range, indicating that quartz or alkali feldspar is the major constituent. Explosive remains also appear scattered to the east for about 300 km (190 mi), covering an area of 70,000 km^{2} (27,000 mi^{2}). The large extent of this pyroclastic deposit is due to the Moon's low gravity, such that a giant explosive eruption from the CBVC was able to spread debris over an area much greater than would be possible on Earth.

=== Rilles ===
These are long, narrow depressions in the lunar surface that resemble channels. Their precise formation remains to be determined, but they were likely formed by different processes. For instance, sinuous rilles meander in a curved path like a mature river and are thought to represent lava channels or the remains of collapsed lava tubes. They normally extend from small pit structures that are believed to have been volcanic vents. Schroter's Valley between Mare Imbrium and Oceanus Procellarum is the largest sinuous rille. Another prominent example is Rima Hadley, which formed nearly 3.3 billion years ago.

Arcuate rilles have a smooth curve and are found on the edges of the dark lunar maria. They are believed to have formed when the lava flows that created a mare cooled, contracted and sank. These are found all over the Moon; prominent examples can be seen near the southwestern border of Mare Tranquillitatis and on the western southeastern border of Mare Humorum.

== Impacts ==
Analysis of Moon magma samples retrieved by the Apollo missions indicate that volcanism on the Moon produced a relatively thick lunar atmosphere for a period of 70 million years between 3 and 4 billion years ago. This atmosphere, sourced from gases ejected from lunar volcanic eruptions, was twice the thickness of that of present-day Mars. It has been theorized, in fact, that this ancient atmosphere could have supported life, though no evidence of life has been found. The ancient lunar atmosphere was eventually stripped away by solar winds and dissipated into space.

Partial melting of the lunar mantle and the emplacement of Oceanus Procellarum flood basalts may have caused axial tilting of the Moon 3 billion years ago, during which time the lunar poles shifted 125 mi (201 km) to their modern positions. This polar wander is inferred from polar hydrogen deposits that are antipodal and displaced equally from each pole along opposite longitudes.

== Recent activity ==
In 2014, NASA announced "widespread evidence of young lunar volcanism" at 70 irregular mare patches identified by the Lunar Reconnaissance Orbiter, some less than 50 million years old. This raises the possibility of a much warmer lunar mantle than previously estimated, at least on the near side where the deep crust is substantially warmer because of the greater concentration of radioactive elements. Just prior to this, evidence has been presented for 2–10 million years younger basaltic volcanism inside the crater Lowell, located in the transition zone between the near and far sides of the Moon. An initially hotter mantle and/or local enrichment of heat-producing elements in the mantle could be responsible for prolonged activities also on the far side in the Orientale basin. There are currently no active volcanoes on the Moon, although moonquake data published in 2012 suggest that there is a substantial amount of magma under the lunar surface. The lack of active volcanism on the Moon may be due to the magma being too dense to rise to the surface.

== See also ==
- List of extraterrestrial volcanoes
- Geology of the Moon
- Lunar magma ocean
- Volcanism on Io
