= Compton–Belkovich Thorium Anomaly =

Lunar hotspot

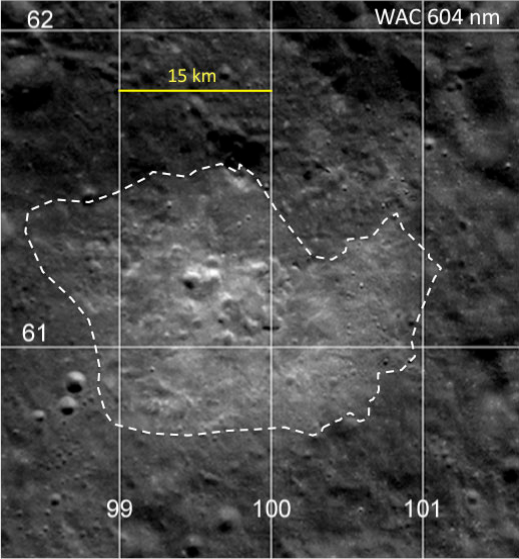
- The Compton–Belkovich Thorium Anomaly, viewed from the Lunar Reconnaissance Orbiter in 2009
- Natural satellite: Moon
- Region: Northern; Far side of the Moon
- Coordinates: 61.1°N 99.5°E
- Diameter: 1 kilometre (0.62 mi) to 6 kilometres (3.7 mi)
- Discoverer: Gamma-ray spectrometer
- Eponym: Arthur H. Compton & Karl T. Compton (Compton crater); Igor Belkovich (Bel'kovich crater)

The Compton–Belkovich Thorium Anomaly is a volcanic complex on the far side of the Moon. It was found by a gamma-ray spectrometer in 1998 and is an area of concentrated thorium, a 'fertile' element. Lunar rock samples from the Apollo missions reveal that most lunar volcanism occurred around 3 to 4 billion years ago, but this feature could have formed as recently as 1 billion years ago due to the unknown history of the Moon's far side.

== Description ==
The Compton–Belkovich Thorium Anomaly was found in 1998 by the Gamma Ray Spectrometer (GRS) instrument on board the Lunar Prospector (LP) and subsequently identified as a hotspot, located around 61.1°N 99.5°E. The estimated thorium concentration reaches 5.3 µg/g (5.3 micrograms per gram) while the surrounding highland basalts only contain between 0 and 2 µg/g. Compared to the Earth's thorium concentration of 0.06 µg/g, the Compton–Belkovich's is very high. It has unusually high reflectance, identified by a visible imaging study that was carried out later by the Clementine spacecraft in a Clementine Visible Images study. High resolution images from the Lunar Reconnaissance Orbiter LRO made it possible to analyze the surface features of the Compton–Belkovich Thorium Anomaly in 2011.

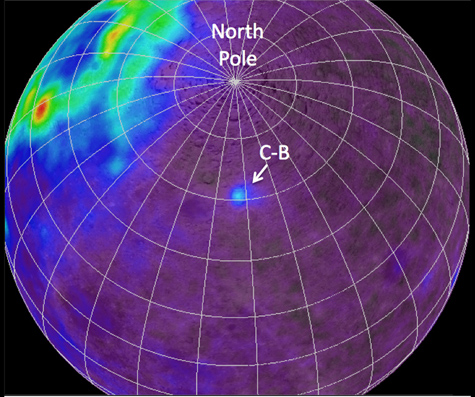
The Compton–Belkovich Thorium Anomaly's location on the Moon.

=== Location ===
The anomaly is between the Bel'kovich crater, which is 214 kilometres (133 mi) wide, and the Compton crater, which is 162 kilometres (101 mi) wide. The region as a whole is 32 kilometres (20 mi) wide and 18 kilometres (11 mi) long.

The center of the region is a volcanic complex, 25 kilometres (16 mi) to 35 kilometres (22 mi) across, between the Bel'kovich and the Compton craters. It is 900 kilometres (560 mi) from the extent of the northeastern Procellarum KREEP Terrane (an area which has high abundances of KREEP, a geochemical component of some lunar rocks).

=== Features ===
In the center of the elevated region is a depression; this is bounded by scarps and may be some kind of caldera. Just to the north is a feature called Little Dome, 500 metres (1,600 ft) in diameter. Further north is an elongated dome, oriented north-south, called Middle Dome. It is 2.5 kilometres (1.6 mi) long and 0.6 kilometres (0.37 mi) wide. Both Little Dome and Middle Dome have boulders on top that may be volcanic blocks. Big Dome is further to the north at the edge of the anomaly. It is 2.5 kilometres (1.6 mi) in diameter with a depression in the top.

An extension of the reflective material extends to the south-east from the elevated region by about 7 kilometres (4.3 mi). This may be a pyroclastic flow. This more highly reflective area also matches an area that shows a Christiansen feature with shorter wavelength. It reflects more strongly in the 7.1 to 7.5 μm range, which indicates quartz or alkali feldspar is the major constituent.

Explosive remains also appear scattered to the east for about 300 km covering an area of 70,000 km^{2}.

=== Volcanic slope ===
Volcanic features provide information about the composition of the lava that formed the Compton–Belkovich Thorium Anomaly. On average, many volcanoes on the Moon have slopes of lower than 7 degrees. However, the Compton–Belkovich Thorium Anomaly has a slope which reaches 25 degrees at the highest. This suggests that the region was formed by more viscous lava.

=== Composition ===
Using infrared reflectance data from Clementine at 750 nm and 950 nm, the level of iron oxide was determined to be about 3% by mass.

=== Formation ===
A direct analysis of Apollo program samples revealed that most lunar volcanism occurred around 3 to 4 billion years ago. However, volcanic activity on the unsampled lunar back side could have occurred around 1 billion years ago. The smoothness of the surface associated with the anomaly indicates that it could possibly have been formed in a more recent event.

As the lava cooled, it would have crystallized to produce a silicate structure; incompatible elements such as thorium would have been excluded from the process and formed thorium-rich pockets in the remaining liquid rock. The eruption associated with the thorium anomaly could have created the elevated features to the west and the low and broad area to the east. The latest possible eruptions of lava would have made domes with steeper slopes, and also would have caused small bulges, as they would barely reach the surface.

== See also ==
- Volcanism on the Moon
