= CBTA =

CBTA may refer to:

- Compton–Belkovich Thorium Anomaly (CBTA), a lunar hotspot
- Cornell Branch of the Telluride Association (CBTA), the Telluride House at Cornell University
- Cyclobutane tetracarboxylic dianhydride (CBTA), the product of the dimerization of maleic anhydride
- CBTA (High school), a type of professional secondary school in Mexico
- CBTA, a television station in Lynn Lake, Manitoba, Canada
- CBTA/CBUA, code for a straight-five engine on some models of the Volkswagen Beetle (A5)
- CBTA-FM, a rebroadcaster for radio station CBTK-FM in Trail, British Columbia, Canada
