= Belʹkovich (crater) =

Lunar impact crater

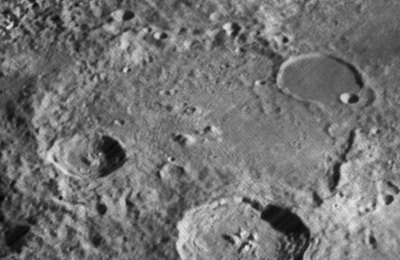
- Oblique Lunar Orbiter 4 image
- Coordinates: 61.1°N 90.2°E
- Diameter: 215.08 km (133.64 mi)
- Depth: Unknown
- Colongitude: 277° at sunrise
- Formation: Nectarian
- Eponym: Igor V. Belʹkovich

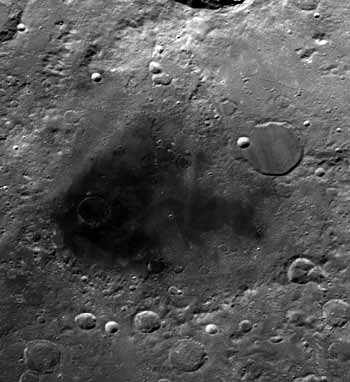
Mare Humboldtianum is the smooth dark patch, with the walled plain Bel'kovich to the upper right. Clementine image.

Belʹkovich is a large lunar impact crater of the form termed a walled plain. This crater dates to the Nectarian period of the lunar geologic timescale. The formation has been heavily eroded by a history of subsequent impacts, leaving it reshaped, worn, and the features softened and rounded. Belʹkovich is located along the northeastern limb of the Moon, and so its visibility is subject to libration effects. From the Earth this crater is viewed from the side, making it difficult to view it in detail.

Belʹkovich intrudes into the northeast portion of the Mare Humboldtianum, and the mare area outside the rim consists of hilly, irregular surface that covers much of the northern half of the lunar mare. The younger crater Hayn intrudes into the northwest rim of Belʹkovich, and the satellite crater Belʹkovich K lies across the northeast rim. In the south, the lava-flooded crater Belʹkovich A cuts across the southern rim, and its western rim is overlain in turn by the small, bowl-shaped Belʹkovich B.

Apart from the intersecting crater formations, the outer rim of Belʹkovich has been degraded and reshaped until it now consists of a roughly circular range of mountains and hills. The northern and northeastern parts of the crater floor and rim is an irregular surface of many small hillocks. The southeast quadrant of the interior is nearly as irregular, and contains a number of small craterlets. Only in the western part of the floor is the surface relatively flat. From here a slender rille extends to the east-southeast before bending to the southeast.

The spectra of the central peak fits a gabbroic anorthosite mineralogy, which originated from a depth of 21.4 to 36.6 km. The infrared spectrum of pure crystalline plagioclase has been identified on the western rim.

To the southeast of Belʹkovich is the prominent Compton crater. East of Belʹkovich and northwest of Compton lies the Compton-Belkovich volcanic complex. This topological feature in the lunar highlands spans a region of roughly 25 km × 35 km in size, at the lunar coordinates 61.3°N and 99.8°E. It has high surface reflectance and volcanic features, including cones, domes, and irregular depressions. There are isolated features of high thorium and silica contents. In 2023, an unusual heat anomaly was discovered at this location.

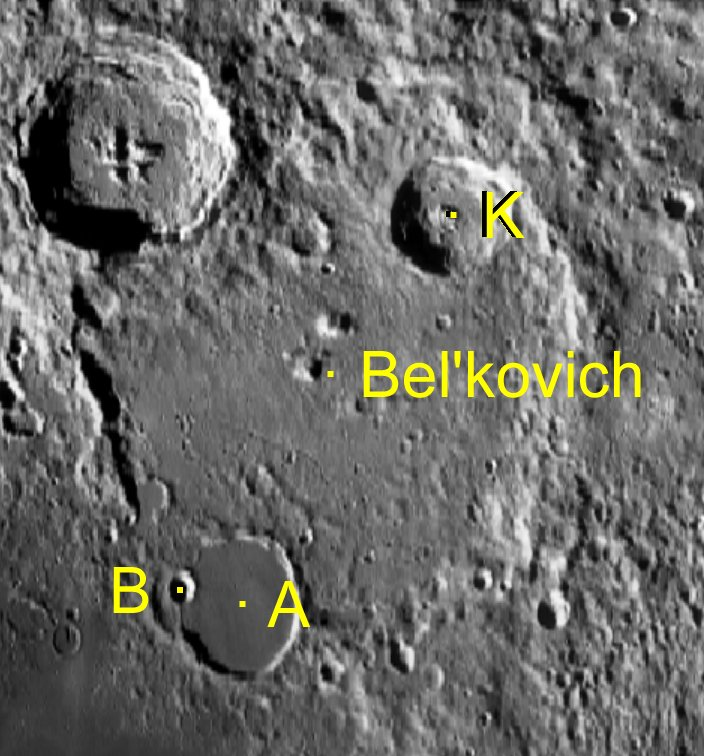
Satellite features of Belʹkovich

This crater is named after Soviet astronomer Igor V. Belʹkovich (1904–1949). The name was introduced into lunar nomenclature by David W. G. Arthur and Ewen Whitaker with the Rectified Lunar Atlas (1963). It was officially adopted by the International Astronomical Union in 1964.

== Satellite craters ==
By convention these features are identified on lunar maps by placing the letter on the side of the crater midpoint that is closest to Belʹkovich.

Belʹkovich	Latitude	Longitude	Diameter
A	58.7° N	86.0° E	58 km
B	58.9° N	85.0° E	13 km
K	63.8° N	93.6° E	47 km
