= Mons Rümker =

Volcanic mountain on the moon

- Named for Karl L. C. Rümker
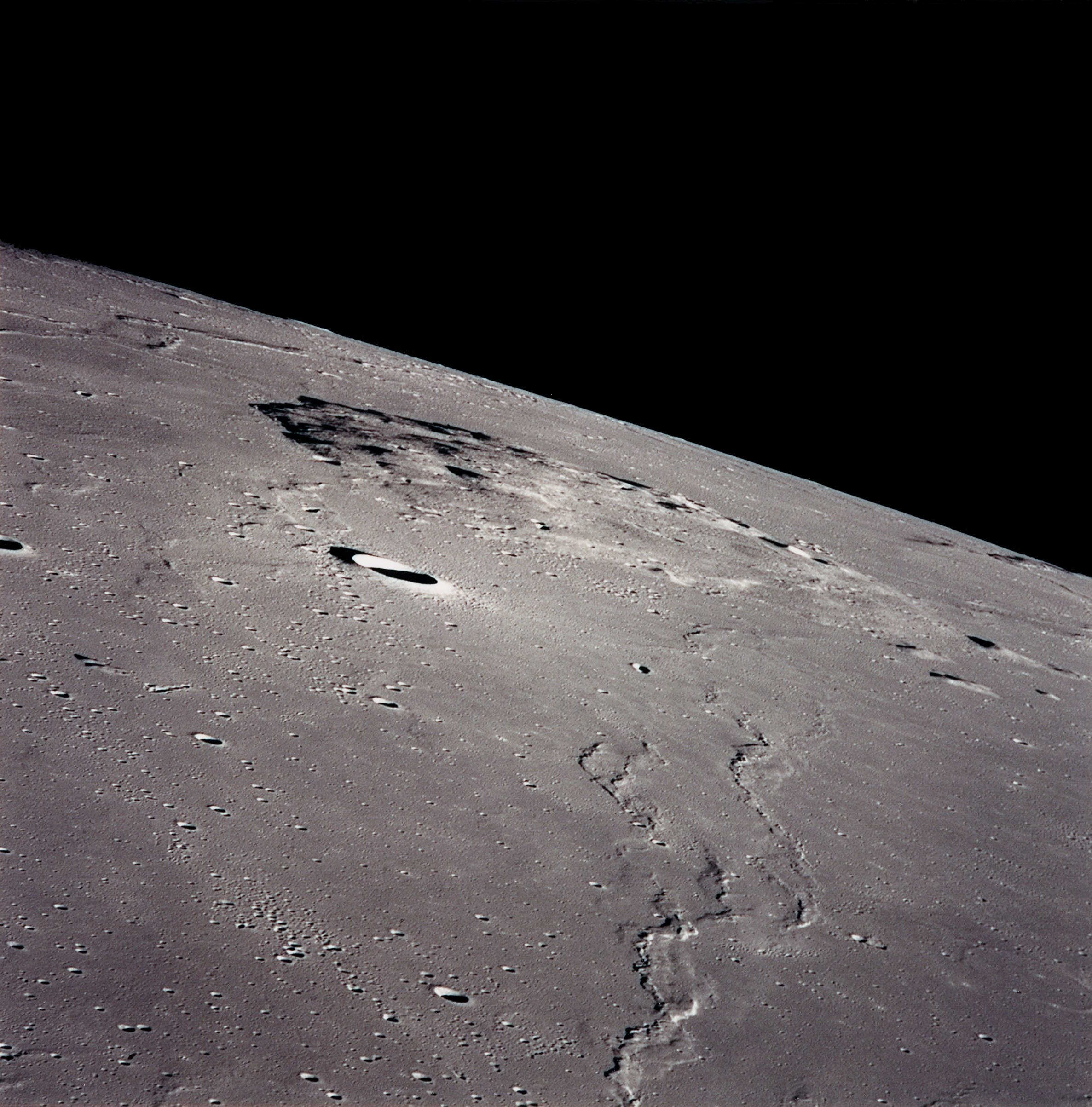
- View of Mons Rümker from Apollo 15

Highest point
- Elevation: 1.3 km (0.81 mi) 4,265 ft (1,300 m)
- Listing: Lunar mountains
- Coordinates: 40.8°N 58.1°W

Naming
- English translation: Rümker Mountain
- Language of name: Latin

Geography
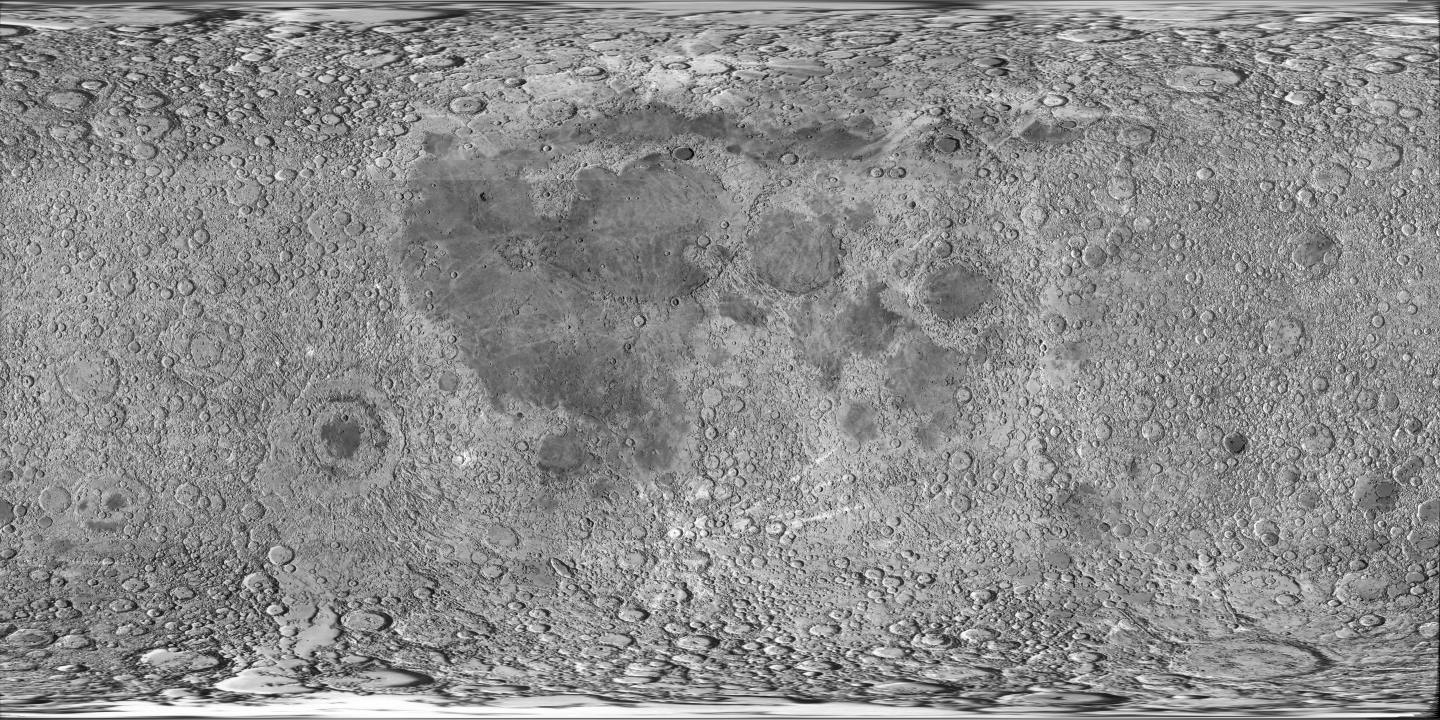
- Location within Moon
- Location: Near side of the Moon

Geology
- Mountain type: Lunar dome

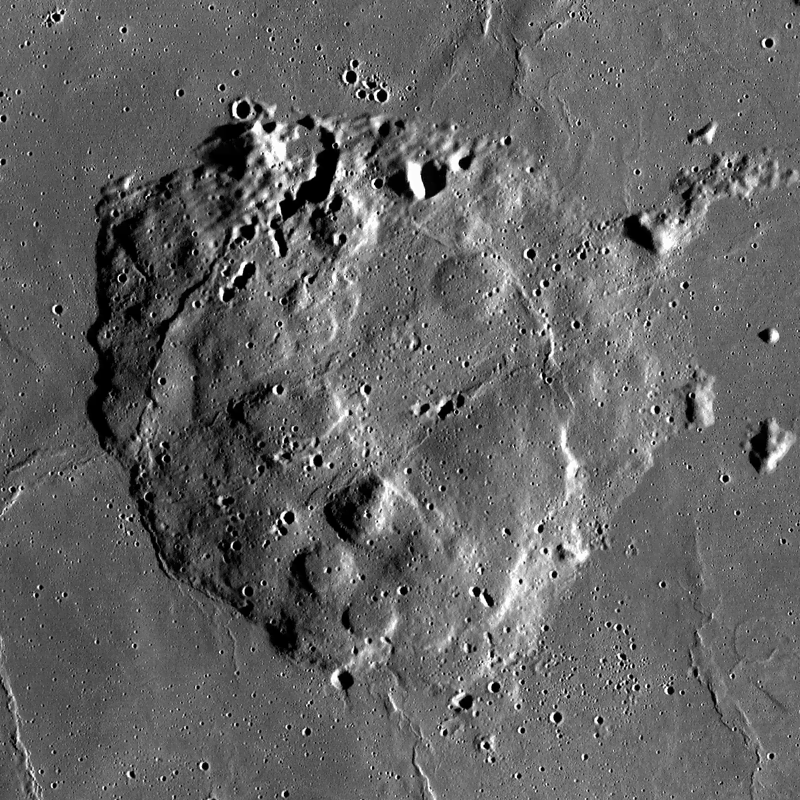
Lunar Reconnaissance Orbiter image

Mons Rümker is an isolated volcanic formation that is located in the northwest part of the Moon's near side, at selenographic coordinates 40.8° N, 58.1° W. The feature forms a large, elevated mound in the northern part of the Oceanus Procellarum. The mound has a diameter of 70 km (43 mi) and climbs to a maximum elevation of about 1,300 m (4,300 ft) above the surrounding plain. It was named after Karl L. C. Rümker.

Mons Rümker has a concentration of 22 lunar domes—rounded bulges across the top, some of which contain a small craterlet at the peak. These are wide, circular features with a gentle slope rising in elevation a few hundred meters to the midpoint. Lunar domes are similar to shield volcanoes, and are the result of lava erupting from localized vents followed by relatively slow cooling.

Mons Rümker is surrounded by a scarp that separates it from the adjacent mare. The plateau rises to an altitude of 900 m (3,000 ft) in the west, 1,100 m (3,600 ft) in the south and 650 m (2,130 ft) in the east. The surface of Mons Rümker is relatively uniform, with a strong spectroscopic signature of lunar mare material. The estimated volume of lava extruded to create this feature is 1,800 km^{3} (430 mi^{3}).

A young lava plain to the northeast from Mons Rümker, named Statio Tianchuan, was the landing site of the Chang'e 5 mission.

== See also ==
- List of mountains on the Moon
- Volcanism on the Moon
