= Swann (crater) =

Crater on the Moon

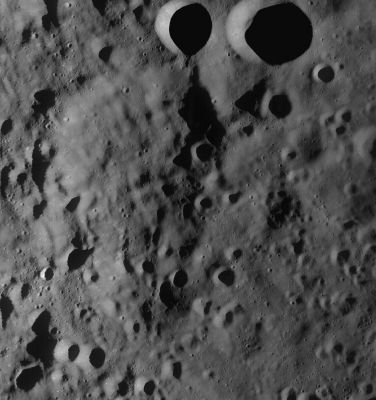
- An image of Swann.
- Coordinates: 52.0°N 112.7°E
- Diameter: 42 km
- Depth: Unknown
- Colongitude: 249° at sunrise
- Eponym: William F. G. Swann

Swann is a lunar impact crater that is located on the far side of the Moon, to the southeast of the prominent crater Compton. This is a heavily worn and battered formation that is now scarcely recognizable as a crater. The terrain along the rim and the interior resembles the surrounding surface, being marked by secondary craters from Compton. To the north and northeast of Swann are two younger, bowl-shaped craters, Swann A and Swann C, with sharp-edged rims that have not received significantly wear.

== Satellite craters ==
By convention these features are identified on lunar maps by placing the letter on the side of the crater midpoint that is closest to Swann.

| Swann | Latitude | Longitude | Diameter |
|---|---|---|---|
| A | 52.9° N | 113.3° E | 15 km |
| C | 52.8° N | 114.4° E | 19 km |
