= Lunar mare =

Large, dark, basaltic plains on Earth's Moon

The near side of the Moon, with major maria and craters labeled

Lunar maria (/ˈmæri.ə/ MARR-ee-ə) (Singular: mare /ˈmɑːreɪ, -i/ MAR-ay, MAR-ee) are large, dark, basaltic plains on Earth's Moon, formed by lava flowing into ancient impact basins. They are less reflective than the "highlands" as a result of their iron-rich composition, and hence appear dark to the naked eye. The maria cover about 16% of the lunar surface, mostly on the side visible from Earth. The few maria on the far side are much smaller, residing mostly in very large craters.

The term "mare" (sea) was used in astronomy in the beginnings of the 17th century, initially with the idea that the lunar spots were covered with water. The traditional nomenclature for the Moon also includes one oceanus (ocean), as well as features with the names lacus ('lake'), palus ('marsh'), and sinus ('bay'). The last three are smaller than maria, but have the same nature and characteristics.

The names of maria refer to sea features (Mare Humorum, Mare Imbrium, Mare Insularum, Mare Nubium, Mare Spumans, Mare Undarum, Mare Vaporum, Oceanus Procellarum, Mare Frigoris), sea attributes (Mare Australe, Mare Orientale, Mare Cognitum, Mare Marginis), or states of mind (Mare Crisium, Mare Ingenii, Mare Serenitatis, Mare Tranquillitatis). Mare Humboldtianum and Mare Smythii were established before the final nomenclature, that of states of mind, was accepted, and do not follow this pattern. When Mare Moscoviense was discovered by the Luna 3, and the name was proposed by the Soviet Union, it was only accepted by the International Astronomical Union with the justification that Moscow is a state of mind.

== History and terminology ==
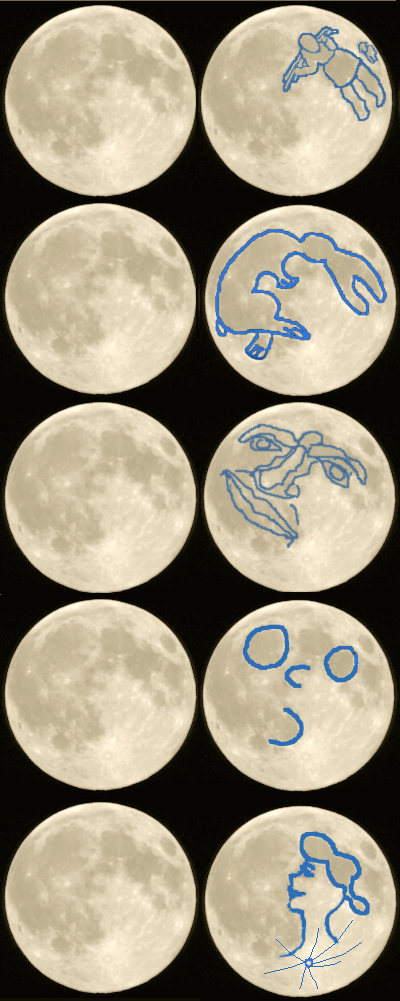
Various traditions gave folkloric names to the lunar maria, including famous patterns like the "Moon rabbit" (second pattern from top to bottom) and the "Man in the Moon" (third or fourth pattern).

=== Pre-history ===
The earliest drawings of the Moon surface have been found in Neolithic stones in Ireland. Moon surface drawings are also found in pre-Columbian art in Mesoamerica.

=== Pre-telescopic descriptions and observations ===
During the Warring States period in China, poems already referred to the dark marks near the dark side of the moon as the Moon rabbit, due to its shape. Many cultures also developed stories due to lunar pareidolia (perception of patterns in the moon), like the "Man in the Moon", a tradition of an apparent human face pattern in the Moon.

During Ancient Greece, philosophers like Thales, Democritus and Anaximenes considered the Moon to be earth-like and rocky (containing no seas). Roman historian Pliny the Elder, uses the term mascula to refer to lunar maria, meaning "spottedness", believing that the Moon was covered in mud. Greco-Roman biographer Plutarch, writes about the Moon in his De facie in orbe Lunae (46–120 AD). Plutarch compares Caspia (Mare Crisium in modern terms) with the Caspian Sea of Earth, which might have contributed to the idea of maria (seas) on the Moon. However, Plutarch adhering to ancient Greek philosophy, explains the Moon spots by the difference between higher and lower terrains, and makes no reference to water.

The first realistic drawings of the Moon are attributed to Renaissance painters Jan van Eyck and Leonardo da Vinci. The latter referred to the Moon features as "stains" (Italian: macchie).

The terminology of "maria" (seas) to refer to the Moon features appears in scientific writings in the 17th century. The first scientific drawing of the Moon was made by physicist William Gilbert in his De mundo nostro sublunari philosophia nova, from about 1600. He regretted the lack of drawings from antiquity that could have allowed him to see if the Moon surface had shifted over time. Gilbert named features of the moon using terminology based in seas and islands, but his work was not made public until 1654.

In 1604 astronomer Johannes Kepler, in his work Dioptrice, refers to the bright and dark features of the moon as "maria" and "terrae" to describe what appeared to be seas and land-masses on the surface of the Moon. The term was used in the name Mare Crisium and appears to have been used independently by astronomers like Thomas Harriot, Pierre Gassendi and Michael van Langren.

=== Telescope sightings ===
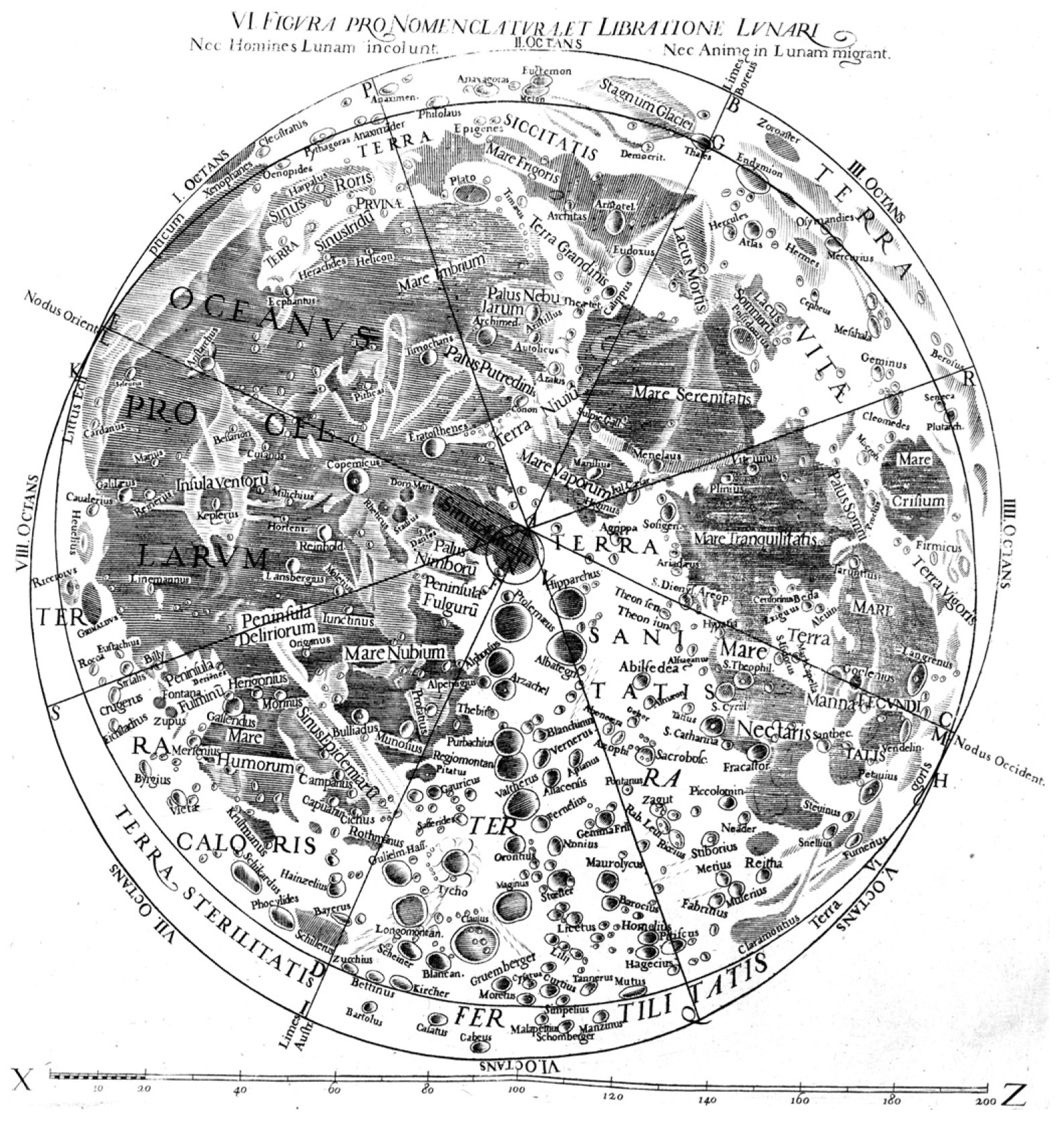
Map of the Moon from Giovanni Battista Riccioli's Almagestus (1651). Riccioli established modern names of lunar maria.

Thomas Harriot was the first in 1609 to describe the Moon using observations from a telescope. He produced a detailed telescopic map in 1611 but his work remained unknown until its re-discovery and publication in 1965.

About the same time, Galileo Galilei published his findings and telescopic observations of the Moon in his treatise Sidereus Nuncius of 1610. He noticed the presence of crater-like features in the Moon, describing the surface as rocky, and made no reference to water or mare. Kepler, after reading Galileo's account changed his mind about the watery nature of lunar maria. Despite Galileo's descriptions, astronomers continued to name lunar features as seas, lakes and bays in their maps.

Notable improvements were made in the sketches of Christoph Scheiner in 1614, Charles Malapert in 1619, Giuseppe Biancani in 1620, Christoforo Borri in 1627, and by Francesco Fontana in 1629 and 1630.

Pierre Gassendi and his friend Nicolas-Claude Fabri de Peiresc set out to make a map of the moon with accurate distances between the features. They measured moonrises and moonsets at different locations and hired professional artists to make drawings of their findings. De Pereisc died before they were finished in 1637. One of the artists Claude Mellan produced one of the most realistic engravings with accurate distances in 1637, with superior accuracy compared to predecessors. Almost at the same time, Michael van Langren hired by the Monarchy of Spain, attempted to calculate accurate distances and produced a series of detailed maps of the Moon in 1645. Similarly, Johannes Hevelius published his Selenographia, sive Lunae descriptio, in which he hired a professional engraver, Jeremias Falck, and published his map in 1647 in sufficient quantity to be widely available. Hevelius insisted on the watery nature of lunar maria.

Using an improved telescope, Giovanni Battista Riccioli made another accurate map of the Moon. Moon features in Ricciolis' map are named using a mixture of previous nomenclature by Van Langren and Hevelius. Riccioli nomenclature remains in use today.

In 1661, Christopher Wren constructed a lunar globe representing the difference cavities and eminences.

=== Origin of the Moon's topology ===
Robert Hooke in his Micrographia (1665), describes the Moon surface as being the result of geological activity. He related craters and maria to volcanism on the Moon.

== Ages ==
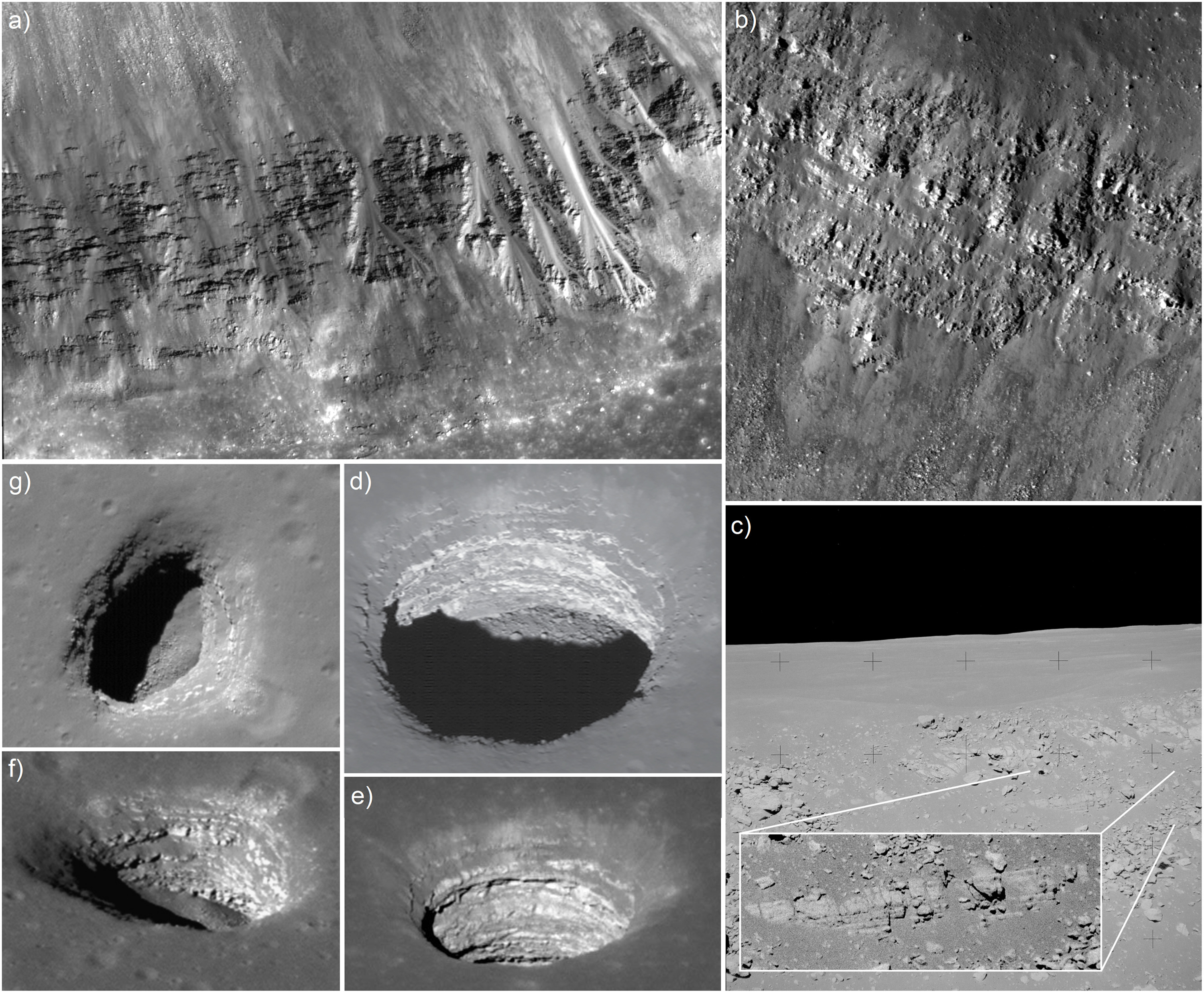
Lunar basalt layering exposed

The ages of the mare basalts have been determined both by direct radiometric dating and by the technique of crater counting. The radiometric ages range from about 3.16 to 4.2 billion years old (Ga), whereas the youngest ages determined from crater counting are about 1.2 Ga. Updated measurements of samples collected by the Chang’e-5 mission show that some lunar basalts could be as young as 2.03 billion years old. Nevertheless, the majority of mare basalts appear to have erupted between about 3 and 3.5 Ga. The few basaltic eruptions that occurred on the far side are old, whereas the youngest flows are found within Oceanus Procellarum on the nearside. While many of the basalts either erupted within, or flowed into, low-lying impact basins, the largest expanse of volcanic units, Oceanus Procellarum, does not correspond to any known impact basin.

Moon – Oceanus Procellarum ("Ocean of Storms")

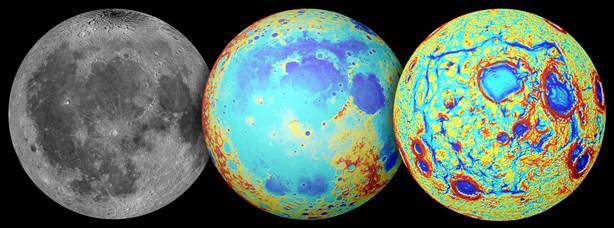
Ancient rift valleys – rectangular structure (visible – topography – GRAIL gravity gradients) (1 October 2014)

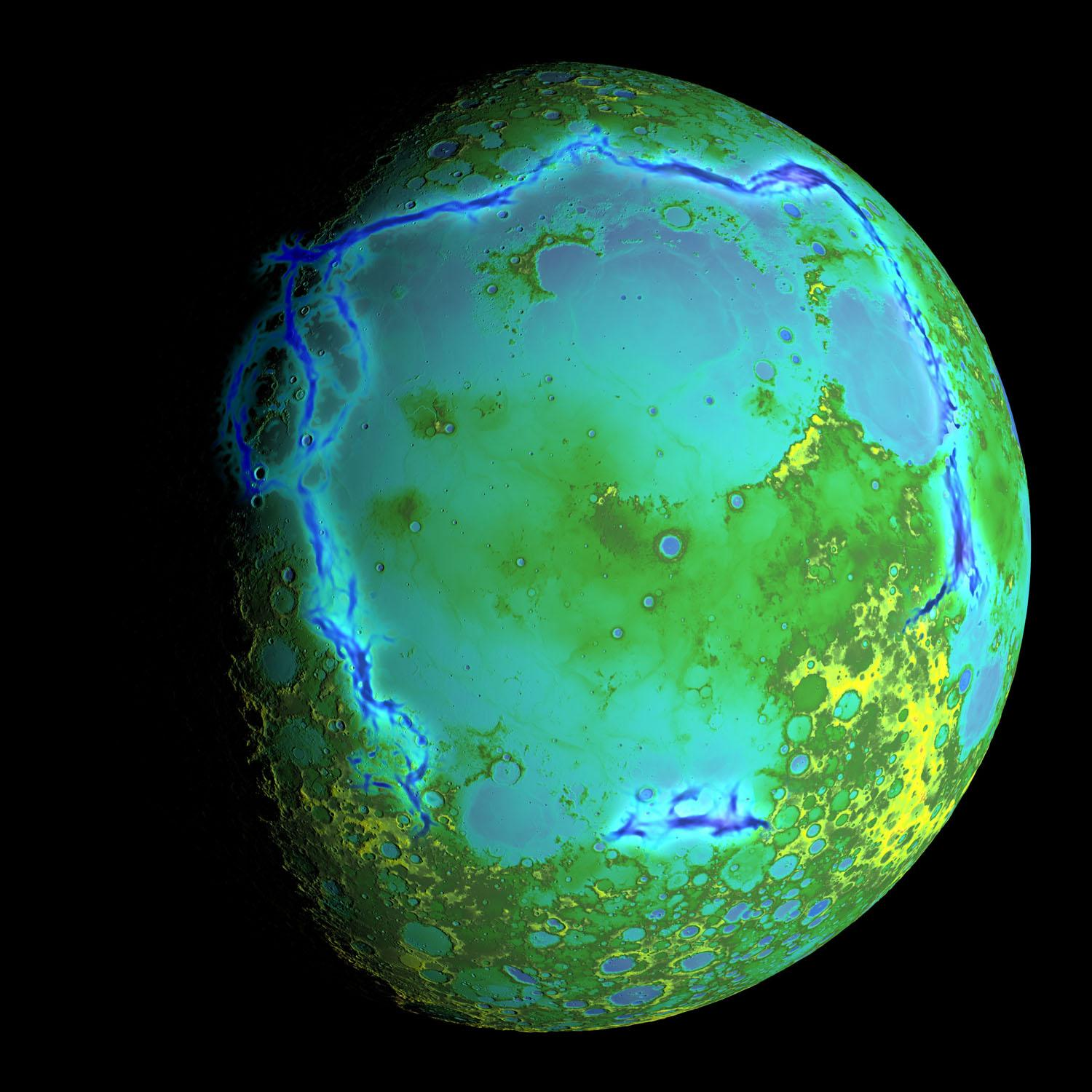
Ancient rift valleys – context.

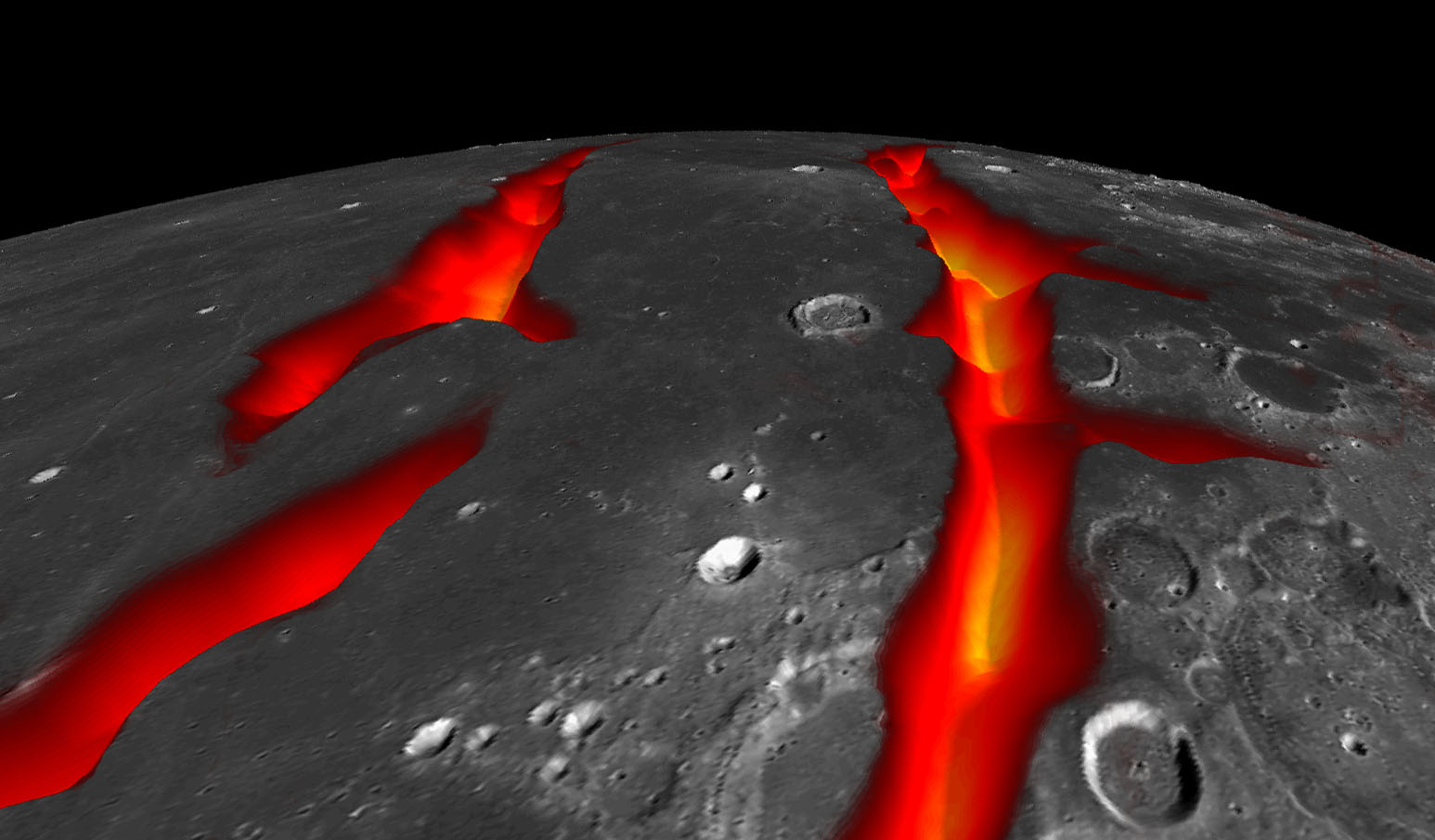
Ancient rift valleys – closeup (artist's concept).

== Distribution of basalts ==
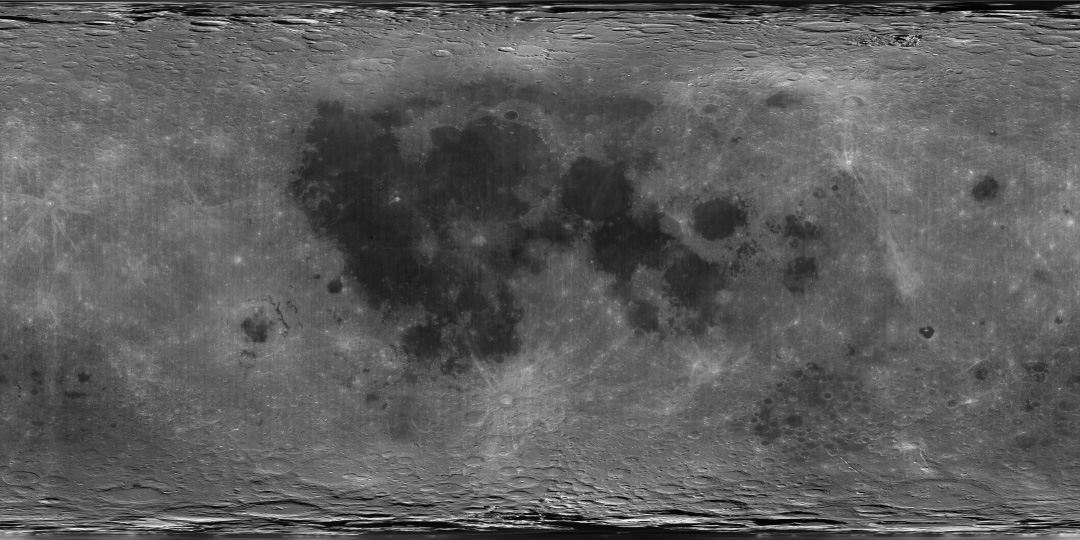
A global albedo map of the Moon obtained from the Clementine mission. The dark regions are the lunar maria, whereas the lighter regions are the highlands. The image is a cylindrical projection, with longitude increasing left to right from −180° E to 180° E and latitude decreasing from top to bottom from 90° N to 90° S. The center of the image corresponds to the mean sub-Earth point, 0° N and 0° E.

There are many common misconceptions concerning the spatial distribution of mare basalts.

1. Since many mare basalts fill low-lying impact basins, it was once assumed that the impact event itself somehow caused the volcanic eruption. Current data in fact may not preclude this, although the timing and length of mare volcanism in a number of basins cast some doubt on it. Initial mare volcanism generally seems to have begun within 100 million years of basin formation. Although these authors felt that 100 million years was sufficiently long that a correlation between impact and volcanism seemed unlikely, there are problems with this argument. The authors also point out that the oldest and deepest basalts in each basin are likely buried and inaccessible, leading to a sampling bias.
2. It is sometimes suggested that the gravity field of the Earth might preferentially allow eruptions to occur on the near side, but not on the far side. However, in a reference frame rotating with the Moon, the centrifugal acceleration the Moon is experiencing is exactly equal and opposite to the gravitational acceleration of the Earth. There is thus no net force directed towards the Earth. The Earth tides do act to deform the shape of the Moon, but this shape is that of an elongated ellipsoid with high points at both the sub- and anti-Earth points. As an analogy, there are two high tides per day on Earth, and not one.
3. Since mare basaltic magmas are denser than upper crustal anorthositic materials, basaltic eruptions might be favored at locations of low elevation where the crust is thin. However, the far side South Pole–Aitken basin contains the lowest elevations of the Moon and yet is only sparingly filled by basaltic lavas. In addition, the crustal thickness beneath this basin is predicted to be much smaller than beneath Oceanus Procellarum. While the thickness of the crust might modulate the quantity of basaltic lavas that ultimately reach the surface, crustal thickness by itself cannot be the sole factor controlling the distribution of mare basalts.
4. It is commonly suggested that there is some form of link between the synchronous rotation of the Moon about the Earth, and the mare basalts. However, gravitational torques that result in tidal despinning only arise from the moments of inertia of the body (these are directly relatable to the spherical harmonic degree-2 terms of the gravity field), and the mare basalts hardly contribute to this (see also tidal locking). (Hemispheric structures correspond to spherical harmonic degree 1, and do not contribute to the moments of inertia.) Furthermore, tidal despinning is predicted to have occurred quickly (in the order of thousands of years), whereas the majority of mare basalts erupted about one billion years later.

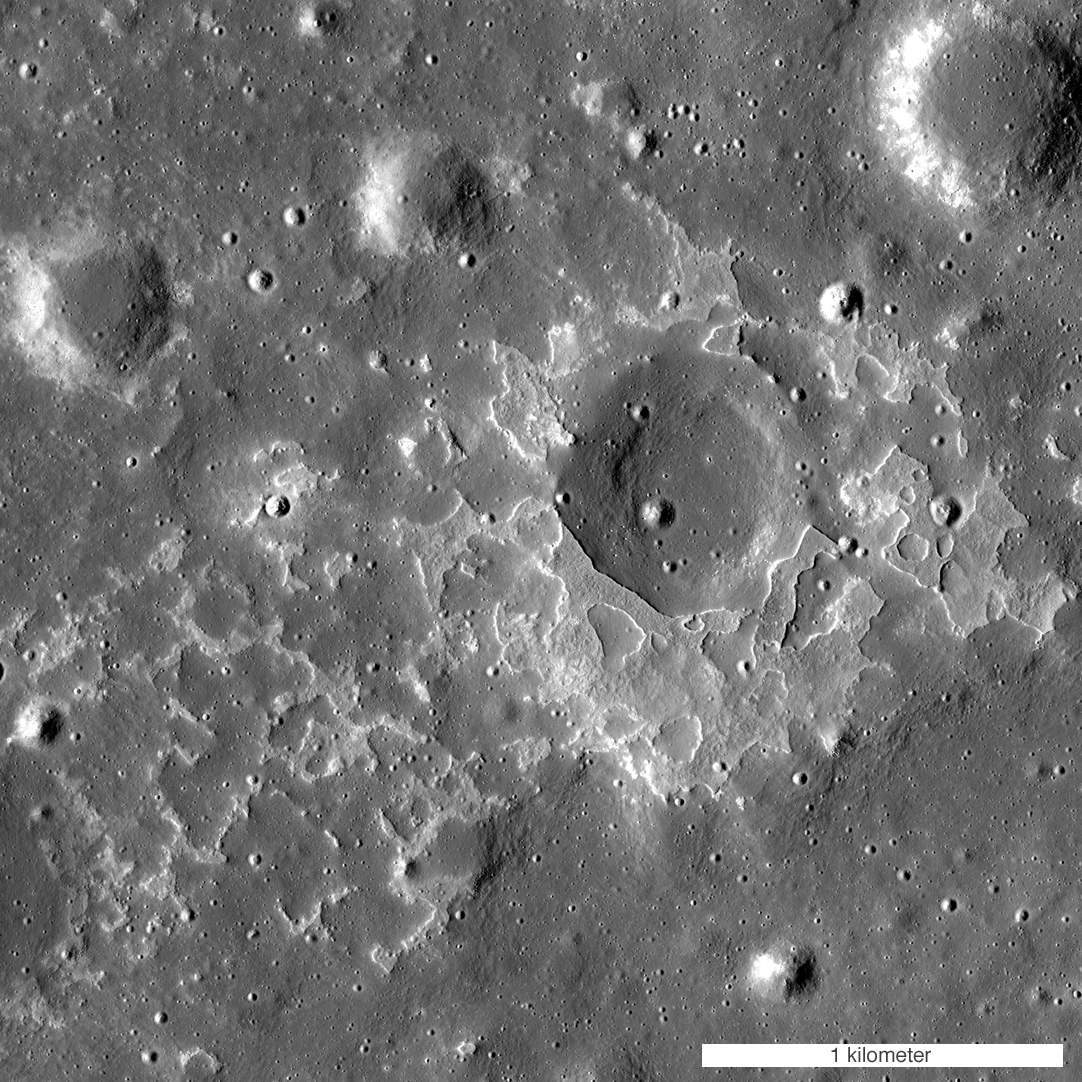
Irregular mare patch – evidence of young lunar volcanism (12 October 2014)

The reason that the mare basalts are predominantly located on the near-side hemisphere of the Moon is still being debated by the scientific community. Based on data obtained from the Lunar Prospector mission, it appears that a large proportion of the Moon's inventory of heat producing elements (in the form of KREEP) is located within the regions of Oceanus Procellarum and the Imbrium basin, a unique geochemical province now referred to as the Procellarum KREEP Terrane. While the enhancement in heat production within the Procellarum KREEP Terrane is most certainly related to the longevity and intensity of volcanism found there, the mechanism by which KREEP became concentrated within this region is not agreed upon.

Cryptomaria refers to lunar volcanic deposits that have been obscured by ejecta from crater and basin impacts. They form about 18% of the total mare basalt area, and can often be identified by dark halo impact craters. An example of cryptomaria is the Schiller-Schickard region, which has been extensively covered by the Orientale basin impact ejecta.

== Chemical composition ==
Using terrestrial classification schemes, all mare basalts are classified as tholeiitic, but specific subclassifications have been invented to further describe the population of lunar basalts. Mare basalts are generally grouped into three series based on their major element chemistry: high-Ti basalts, low-Ti basalts, and very-low-Ti (VLT) basalts. While these groups were once thought to be distinct based on the Apollo samples, global remote sensing data from the Clementine mission now shows that there is a continuum of titanium concentrations between these end members, and that the high-titanium concentrations are the least abundant. TiO_{2} abundances can reach up to 15 wt.% for mare basalts, whereas most terrestrial basalts have abundances much less than 4 wt.%. A special group of lunar basalts is the KREEP basalts, which are abnormally rich in potassium (K), rare-earth elements (REE), and phosphorus (P). A major difference between terrestrial and lunar basalts is the near-total absence of water in any form in the lunar basalts. Lunar basalts do not contain hydrogen-bearing minerals like the amphiboles and phyllosilicates that are common in terrestrial basalts due to alteration or metamorphism.

== See also ==
- Apollo 11 landing site
  - Mare Tranquillitatis
- Volcanism on the Moon
- Moon rabbit
- Moon rock
- Selenography
