= Lunar terrane =

Geologic province on the Moon

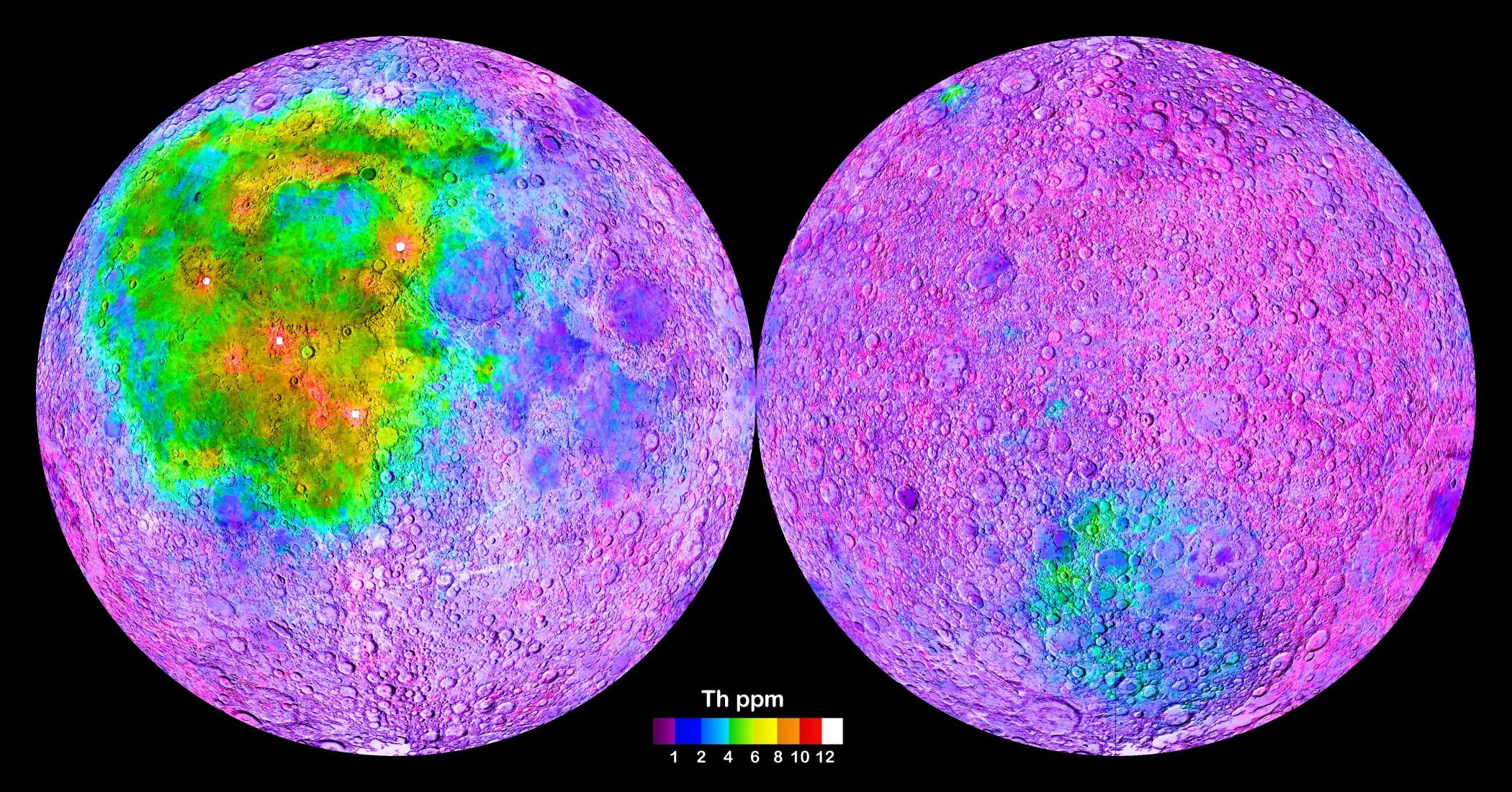
Thorium concentrations on the Moon. The large area of high concentration on the Near Side (left) corresponds to the Procellarum KREEP Terrane, and the smaller area on the Far Side (right) to the South Pole–Aitken Terrane. The large purple area to the north of this includes the Felspathic Highlands Terrane, which is not reflected in thorium concentrations.

A lunar terrane is a major geologic province on the Moon. Three terranes have been identified on the Moon: the Procellarum KREEP Terrane, the Feldspathic Highlands Terrane, and the South Pole–Aitken Terrane. Each terrane has a unique origin, composition, and thermal evolution.

== Procellarum KREEP Terrane ==
The Procellarum KREEP Terrane, or PKT, is a large province on the near side of the Moon that has high abundances of KREEP. KREEP is an acronym built from the letters K (the atomic symbol for potassium), REE (rare-earth elements) and P (for phosphorus), and is a geochemical component of some lunar impact breccia and basaltic rocks. Notably, it is high in the KREEP element thorium, at a level of 4.8 ppm. This is a major factor distinguishing it from the other terranes. The PKT is on the near side of the moon, and covers 10% of the lunar surface, or 16% if one includes the maria lying within the FHT. Despite this, it contains 60% of all basaltic flows. KREEP has been shown to lower the melting point of rocks similar to those found on the Moon, and is expected to have contributed to volcanism in the region.

The Oceanus Procellarum and Mare Imbrium regions lie within the PKT. In general, many maria, such as (but not limited to) Mare Frigoris and Mare Cognitum are members of the PKT. Not all maria are in the PKT, however - Mare Crisium and Mare Orientale are located within the outer Feldspathic Highlands.

The PKT is the only terrane to lie exclusively in the near side of the Moon. Human and robotic missions have been done to this terrane, and samples have been returned to Earth for further study.

== Felspathic Highlands Terrane ==
The Felspathic Highlands Terrane (alternatively Feldspathic), or FHT, is composed predominantly of ancient anorthositic materials. It has low iron oxide and thorium levels. The FHT can be split into an inner and outer felspathic highlands. The outer FHT has comparatively higher levels of iron oxide and thorium. It is thought to be part of the FHT, with the differences being due to modification by ejecta from impacts in other terranes. The FHT covers 65% of the lunar surface.

Overall, 6% of the lunar surface (and hence 9% of the FHT) consists of maria within the FHT, such as Mare Moscoviense. FHT maria have on average only 2.2 ppm of thorium, which is twice as much as the lunar average but significantly less than the levels seen in the PKT maria. Outer FHT non-maria regions contain 1 ppm of thorium, and only 0.3 ppm of thorium in the inner FHT.

The inner FHT lies exclusively in the far side of the Moon, whereas the outer FHT spans both sides and is the one of two terranes on the near side of the Moon, along with the PKT. No spacecraft have landed on the inner FHT, as the only lander to the far side touched down in the South Pole-Aitken Terrane. In contrast, the outer FHT has been the subject of human landings and sample return.

== South Pole-Aitken Terrane ==
The South Pole-Aitken Terrane, or SPAT, may simply represent deep crustal materials of the Feldspathic Highlands Terrane. It has thorium levels between those of the PKT and FHT. The SPAT can be divided into two terranes, an outer and an inner SPAT. The outer SPAT has less iron oxide and thorium than its inner counterpart, although the thorium levels are still between those of the PKT and FHT. The terrane has its origins in a large impact that occurred early in the Moon's history and which had a major impact on the Moon's thermal evolution.

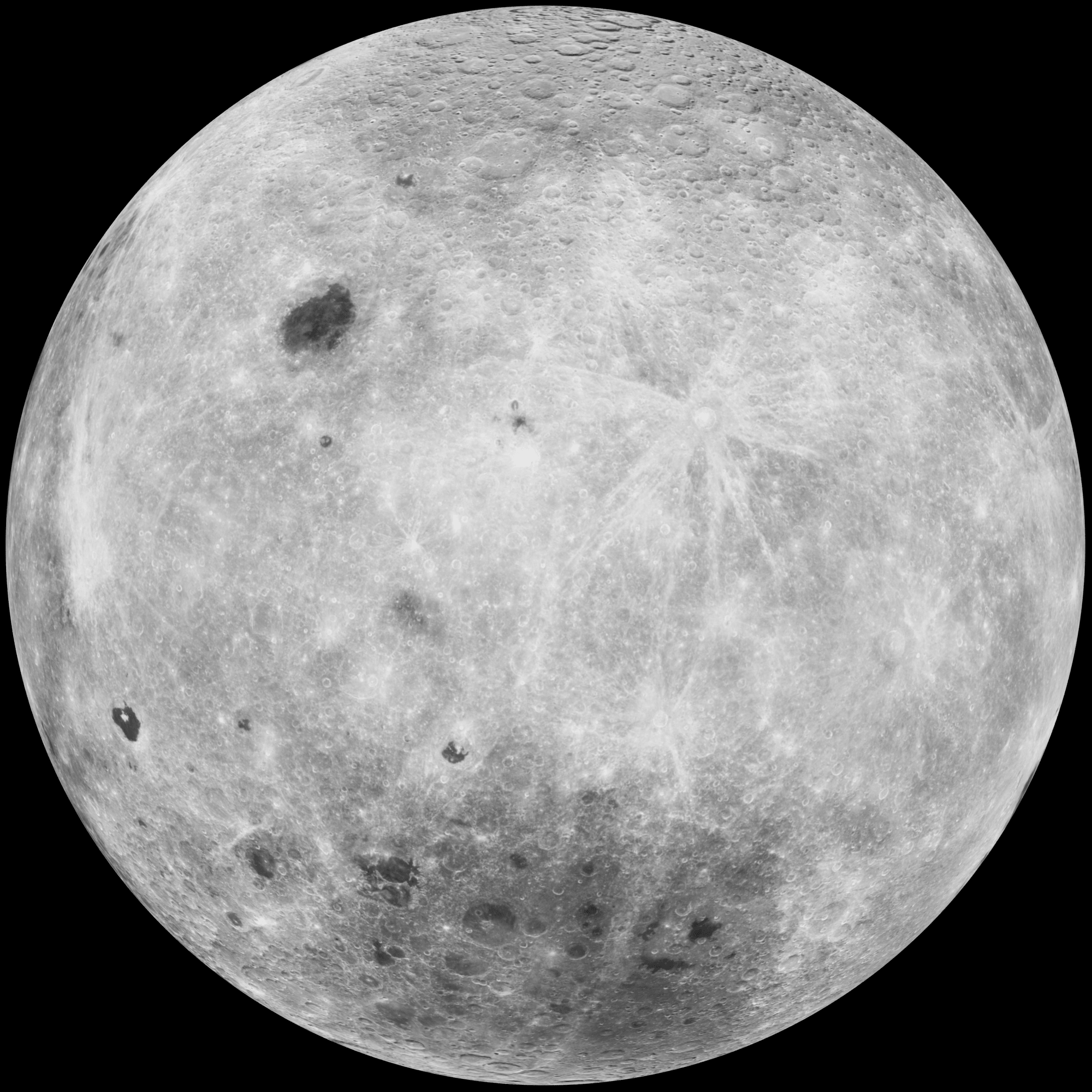
The SPAT corresponds to the darker region in the far side of the moon.

The inner and outer SPAT cover 5.3% and 5.7% of the lunar surface, respectively. Despite collectively covering 11% of the surface, SPAT contains only 5.8% of the thorium in the lunar crust.

The SPAT lies exclusively in the far side of the moon, and contains the South Pole-Aitken basin. Chang'e 4, the first and only far-side lander, has landed in the region. It is not a sample return mission, and thus no samples have been directly taken from this terrane yet.

== Historical terranes ==
In the 1600s, the Moon was divided into two terranes, terra and maria. The terra terrane was thought to be landmass, and the maria terrane was thought to be the Moon's ocean, although this is now known to be false. The maria terrane is lower in elevation and younger in age than the terra terrane, and was formed by lava. The terra terrane is higher and older, and hence more cratered. Visually, the maria correspond to the dark regions of the Moon, and the terra to the light.

== Map of lunar terranes ==
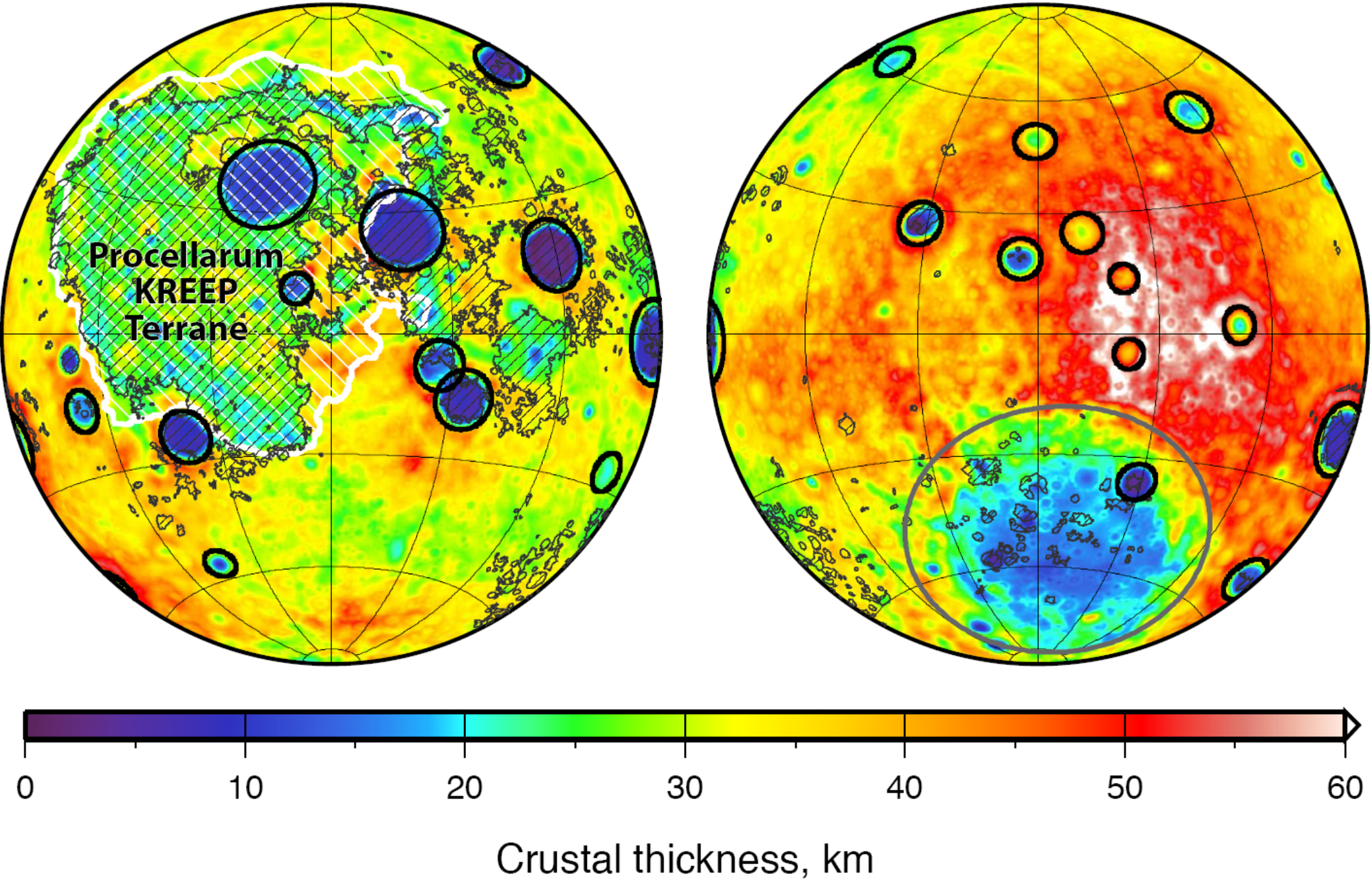
The PKT is labeled in the image; the region within the green circle in the polar region is SPAT, and the rest is FHT. While not labeled, the high-thickness (red) region on the right hemisphere corresponds to the inner FHT. The left hemisphere is the near side of the moon, and the right hemisphere is the far side.

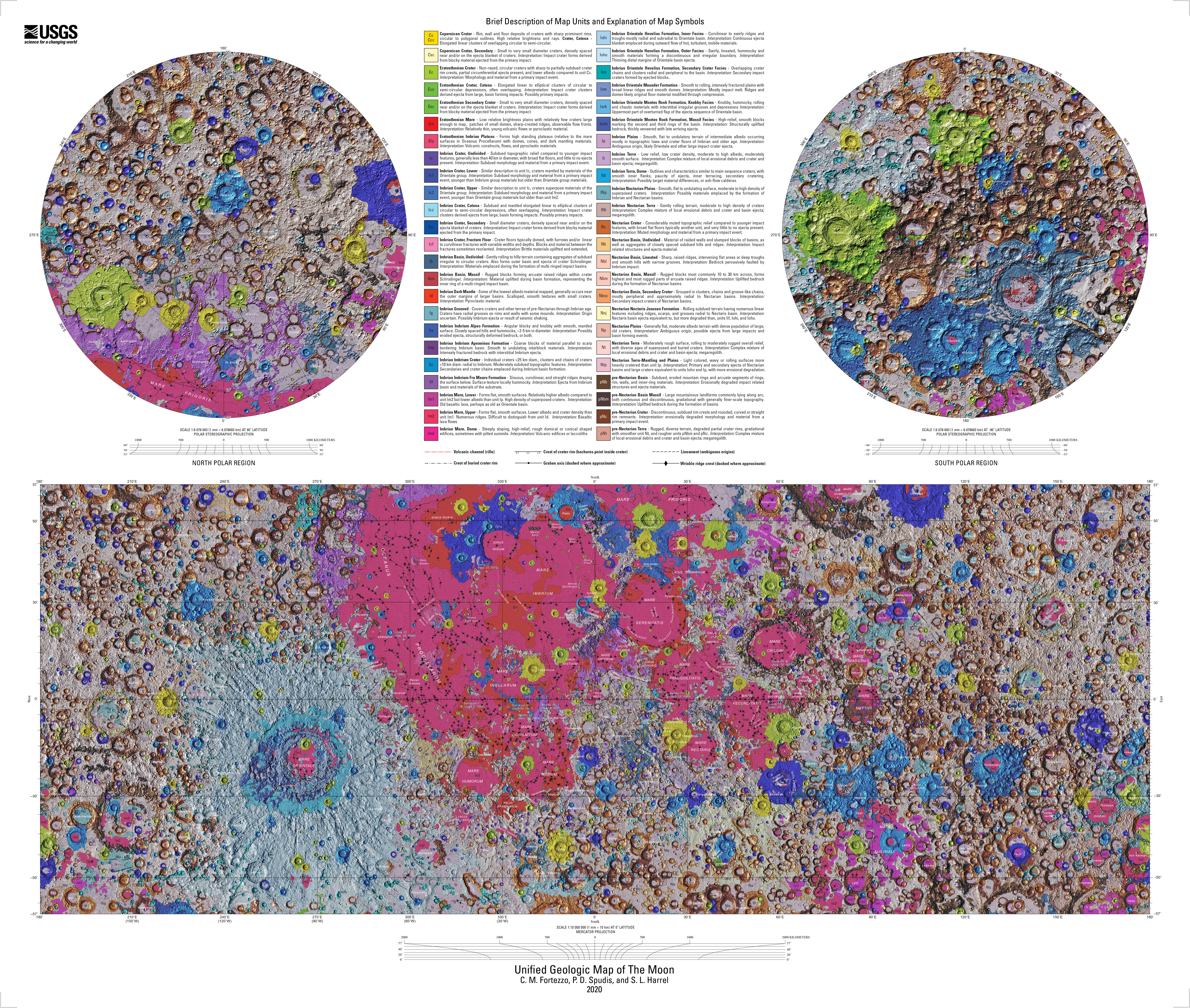
The magenta region corresponds to the PKT - the regions formed by volcanic activity (the maria) almost exclusively lie within the PKT.

== See also ==
- Geology of the Moon
