= Compton (crater) =

Lunar impact crater

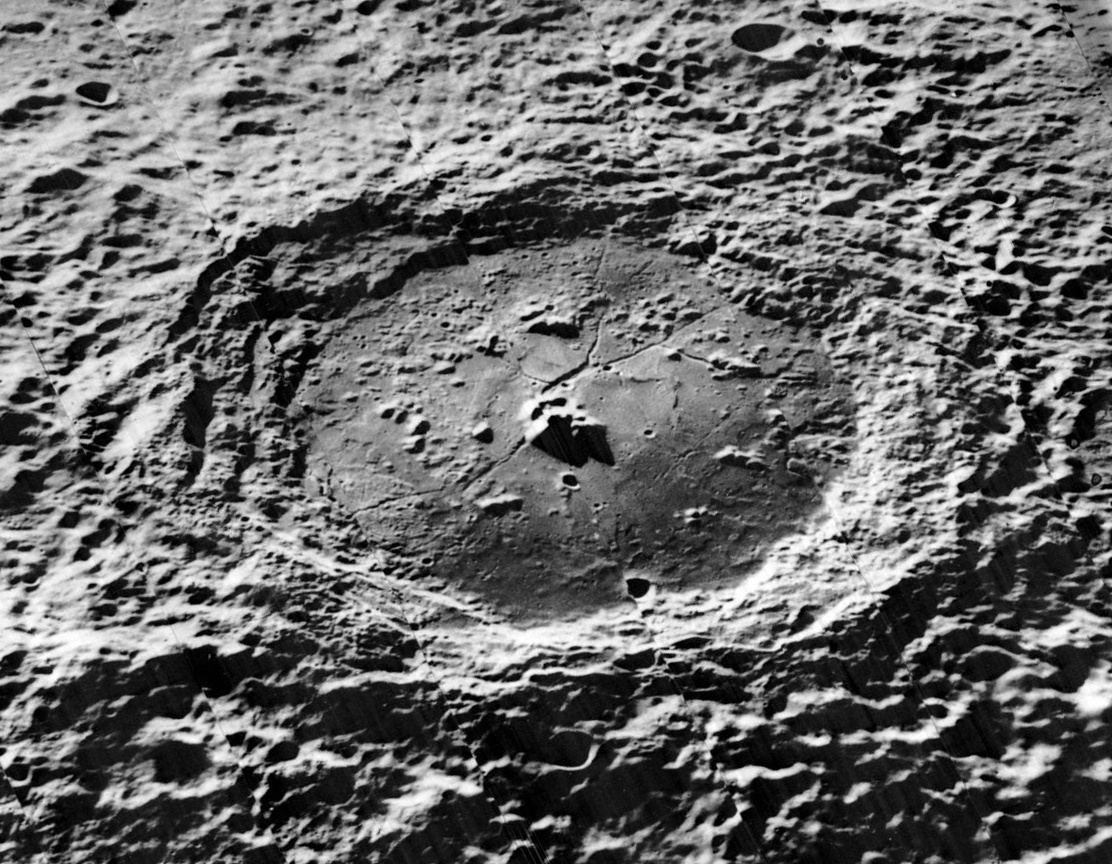
- Oblique Lunar Orbiter 5 image, facing west
- Coordinates: 55.3°N 103.8°E
- Diameter: 164.63 km (102.30 mi)
- Depth: 3.85 km (2.39 mi)
- Colongitude: 260° at sunrise
- Formation: Lower Imbrian
- Eponym: Arthur H. Compton; Karl T. Compton

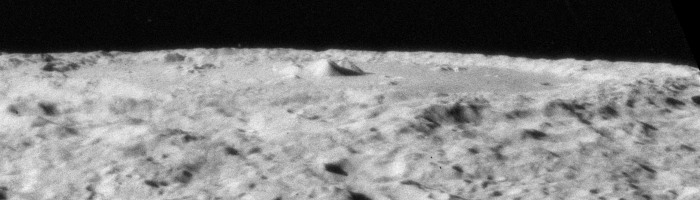
Oblique view from Apollo 16

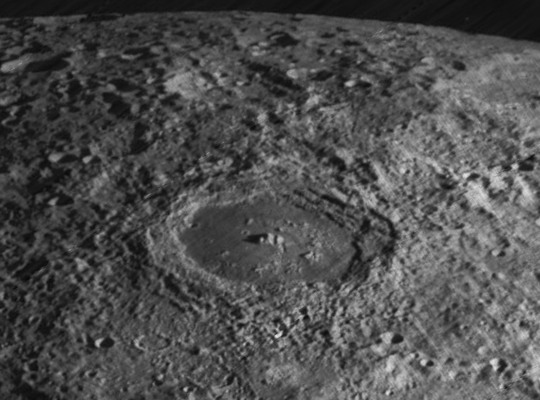
Lunar Orbiter 4 image showing surroundings

Compton is a prominent lunar impact crater that is located in the northern hemisphere on the far side of the Moon. It lies to the east of the Mare Humboldtianum, and southwest of Schwarzschild, a walled plain. To the southeast of Compton is the heavily eroded crater Swann.

This crater is named after American physicists Arthur H. Compton (1892–1962) and Karl T. Compton (1887–1954). A. H. Compton was a 1927 Nobel laureate in physics for his discovery of the Compton effect. Its designation was officially adopted by the International Astronomical Union in 1970.

== Description ==
Compton is one of the largest craters of Lower (Early) Imbrian age. This formation is roughly circular, with a wide, irregular outer rim that varies considerably in width. Parts of the inner wall have terraced steps that form wide shelves along the edge. Within the wall is a floor that has been resurfaced by basalt flows some time in the past. This surface has a lower albedo than the surroundings, giving it a slightly darker hue.

The interior contains a set of slender rilles within the ring of hills, primarily in the northwest part of the crater floor. Apart from a small, bowl-shaped crater near the eastern rim, the floor only contains a few tiny craters. At the midpoint of the floor is a formation of mounts that comprise the central peak. The spectra of the central peak fits an anorthositic gabbro mineralogy, which originated from a depth of 5.9 to 16.2 km.

The midpoint is nearly surrounded by a circle of hills, creating a peak ring formation that lie at a radius about half that of the inner wall. These mounts form jagged rises through the basalt-covered surface and lie at irregular intervals from each other. The infrared spectrum of pure crystalline plagioclase has been identified on this peak ring.

== Satellite craters ==
By convention these features are identified on lunar maps by placing the letter on the side of the crater midpoint that is closest to Compton.

Compton	Latitude	Longitude	Diameter
E	55.4° N	113.4° E	19 km
R	52.6° N	91.5° E	37 km
W	58.6° N	97.2° E	16 km
