= Mare Humboldtianum =

Lunar mare on the far side of the Moon

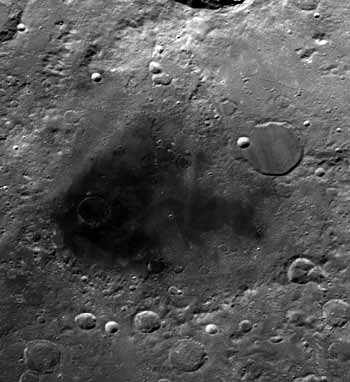
- Mare Humboldtianum is the smooth dark patch. The upper right is occupied by the walled plain Bel'kovich. Clementine image.
- Coordinates: 56.9°N 81.5°E
- Diameter: 230 km (140 mi)
- Eponym: Sea of Alexander von Humboldt

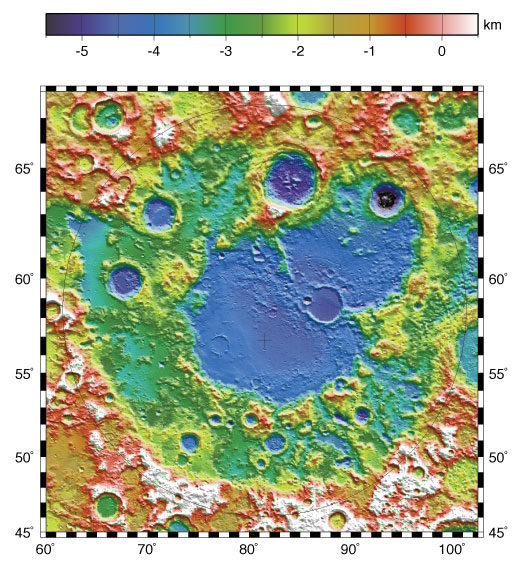
Elevation map of Humboldtianum basin

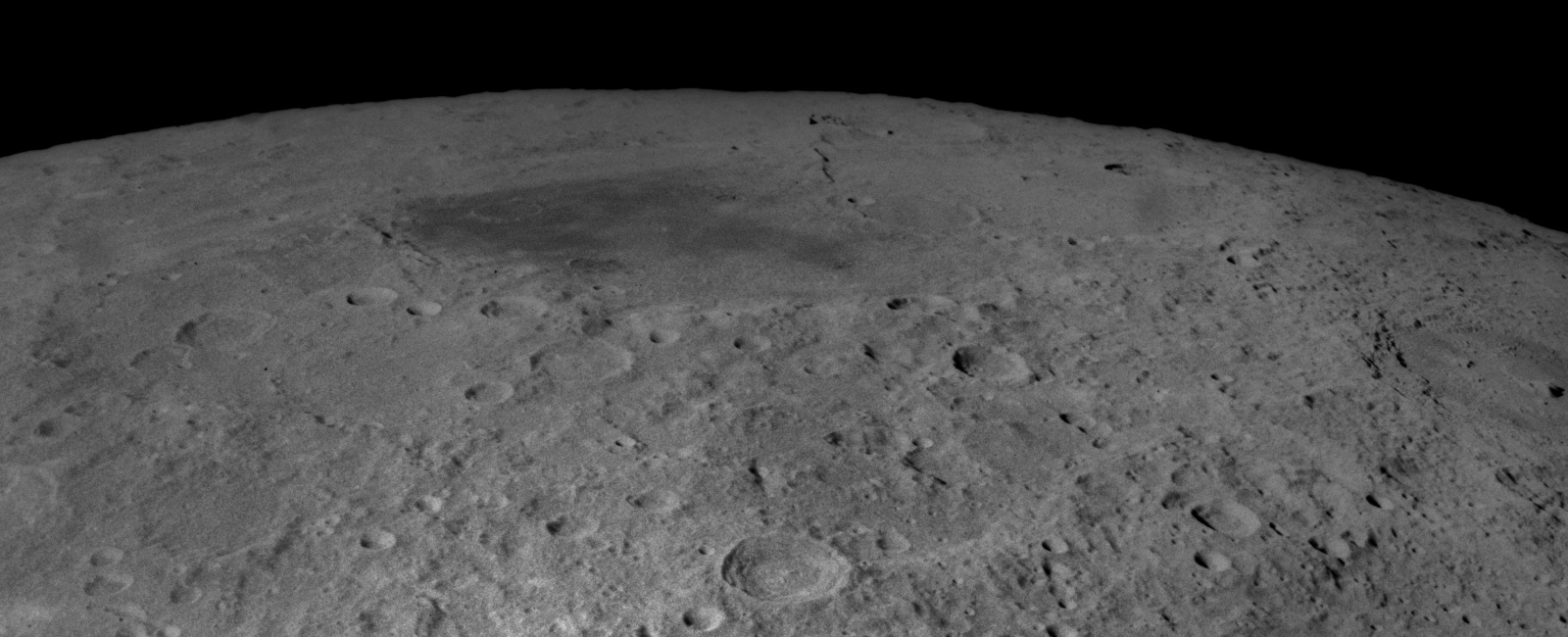
Oblique view from Apollo 16

Mare Humboldtianum /hʌmboʊltiˈeɪnəm/ (Latin humboldtiānum, the "Sea of Alexander von Humboldt") is a lunar mare located just to the east of Mare Frigoris, in the center of Humboldtianum basin. It is located along the northeastern limb of the Moon, and continues on to the far side. Due to its location, the visibility of this feature can be affected by libration, and on occasion it can be hidden from view from Earth.

The basin material is of the Nectarian epoch, with the mare material being of the Upper Imbrian epoch (3.4–3.7 Ga). The lighter gray area to the southeast of the dark mare material is a region of hills within the basin. The rim of this basin forms a mountain range that can be seen under oblique lighting conditions.

This mare is centered at 56.9° N, 81.5° E, and its maximal size is 230 km. However the surrounding basin extends for a diameter of over 600 km. The walled plain named Bel'kovich spills over the northwestern portion of Mare Humboldtianum, and the flooded crater Bel'kovich A lies across the southwestern rim of Bel'kovich and part of the floor of the mare.

At the center of the Humboldtianum basin is a mascon, or gravitational high. The mascon was first identified by Doppler tracking of the Lunar Prospector spacecraft.

This mare is situated between near (visible) and far sides of the Moon, like a link between known and unknown. That's why Johann Mädler named it after Alexander von Humboldt, a prominent explorer of unknown lands. It is one of only two lunar maria that are named after people, the other being Mare Smythii (named after British astronomer William Henry Smyth) which is located along the eastern lunar limb.

== Popular culture ==
- In an episode of the 1967 TV Series Captain Scarlet and the Mysterons, a Mysteron outpost was shown to be located somewhere in the Humboldt Sea.
