= Near side of the Moon =

Hemisphere of the Moon facing the Earth

The names of the major maria and some craters on the near side of the Moon

The near side of the Moon is the hemisphere of the Moon that is facing Earth. While Earth keeps turning through its near side to the Moon, changing in the course of a day the part it faces toward the Moon, the Moon keeps the same surface (or "face") oriented to Earth. This is due to the Moon rotating on its axis at the same rate that the Moon orbits Earth—a phenomenon known as tidal locking. The opposite hemisphere is the far side.

The Moon is directly illuminated by the Sun, and the cyclically varying viewing conditions from Earth cause the lunar phases. The near side when dark is faintly visible due to earthshine, which is indirect sunlight reflected from the surface of Earth and onto the Moon.

Since the Moon's orbit is both slightly eccentric and inclined to its equatorial plane, libration allows up to 59% of the lunar surface to be visible from Earth over the course of a sidereal month (though only half at any moment from any point).

The near side as observed (from Earth's Northern Hemisphere) over the course of one month, showing the libration effects

== Orientation ==
The image of the Moon here is drawn as is normally shown on maps, that is with north on top and west to the left. Astronomers traditionally turn the map to have south on top to correspond with the northern-hemisphere view in astronomical telescopes, which typically show the image upside down.

West and east on the Moon are where they would be expected, when standing on the Moon. But when the Moon is seen from Earth, then the east–west direction is reversed. When specifying coordinates on the Moon it should therefore always be mentioned whether geographic (or rather selenographic) coordinates are used or astronomical coordinates.

The Moon's actual orientation in Earth's sky or on the horizon depends on the viewers geographic latitude on Earth. In the following description a few typical cases will be considered.

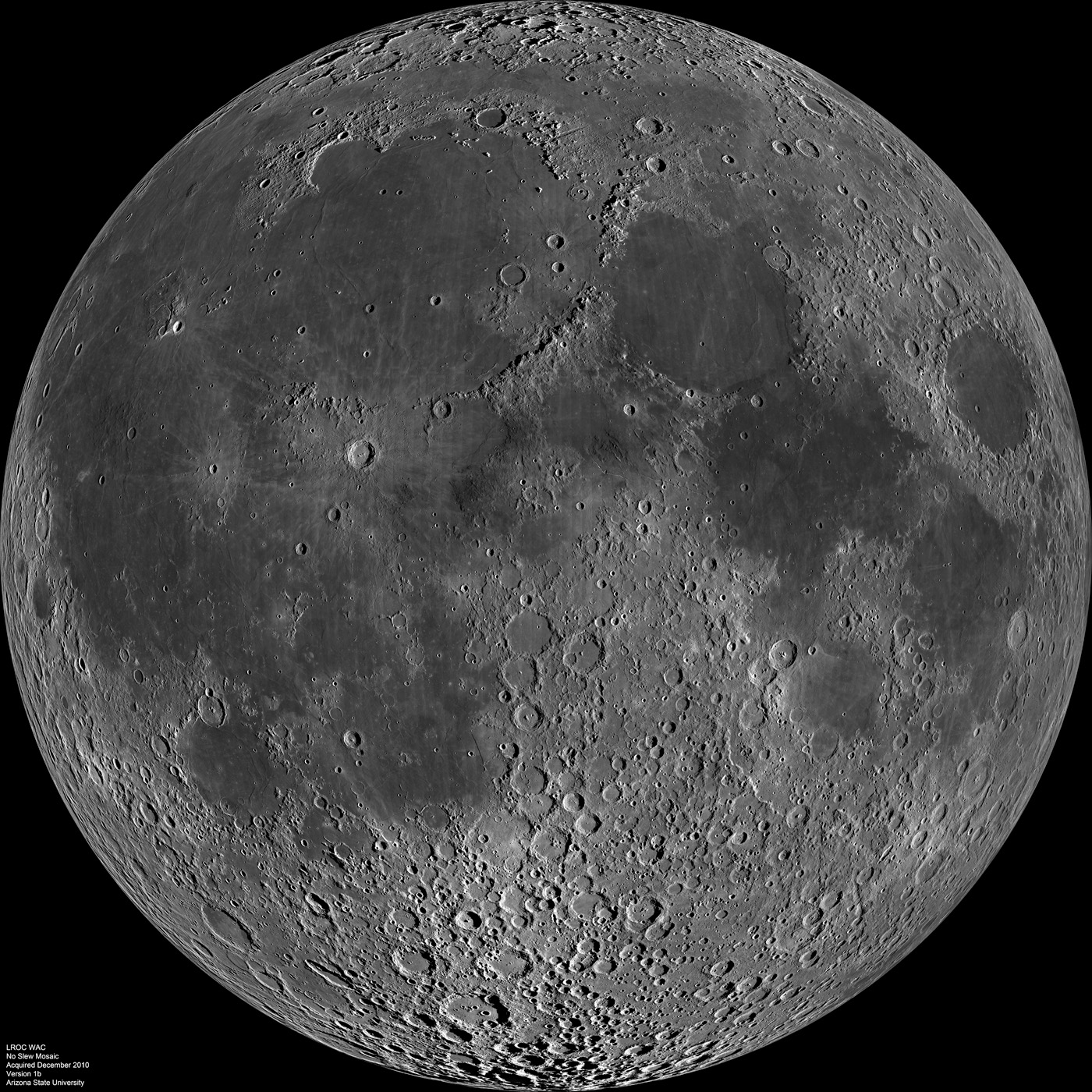
Detailed view by NASA's Lunar Reconnaissance Orbiter

- On the north pole, if the Moon is visible, it stands low above the horizon with its north pole up.
- In mid northern latitudes (North America, Europe, Asia) the Moon rises in the east with its northeastern limb up (Mare Crisium), it reaches its highest point in the south with its north on top, and sets in the west with its northwestern limb (Mare Imbrium) on top.
- On the equator, when the Moon rises in the east, its N — S axis appears horizontal and Mare Foecunditatis is on top. When it sets in the west, about 12.5 hours later, the axis is still horizontal, and Oceanus Procellarum is the last area to dip below the horizon. In between these events, the Moon reached its highest point in the zenith and then its selenographic directions are lined up with those on Earth.
- In mid southern latitudes (South America, South Pacific, Australia, South Africa) the Moon rises in the east with its southeastern limb up (Mare Nectaris), it reaches its highest point in the north with its south on top, and sets in the west with its southwestern limb (Mare Humorum) on top.
- On the south pole the Moon behaves as on the north pole, but there it appears with its south pole up.

Schematics of moonrise on different Earth latitudes

Moon – Oceanus Procellarum ("Ocean of Storms")

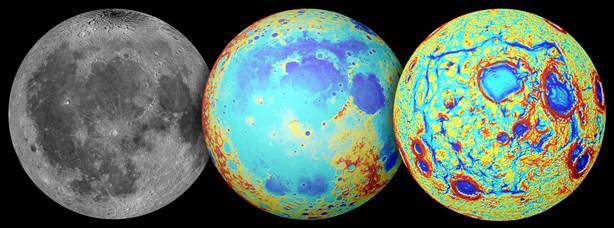
Ancient rift valleys – rectangular structure (visible – topography – GRAIL gravity gradients) (October 1, 2014).

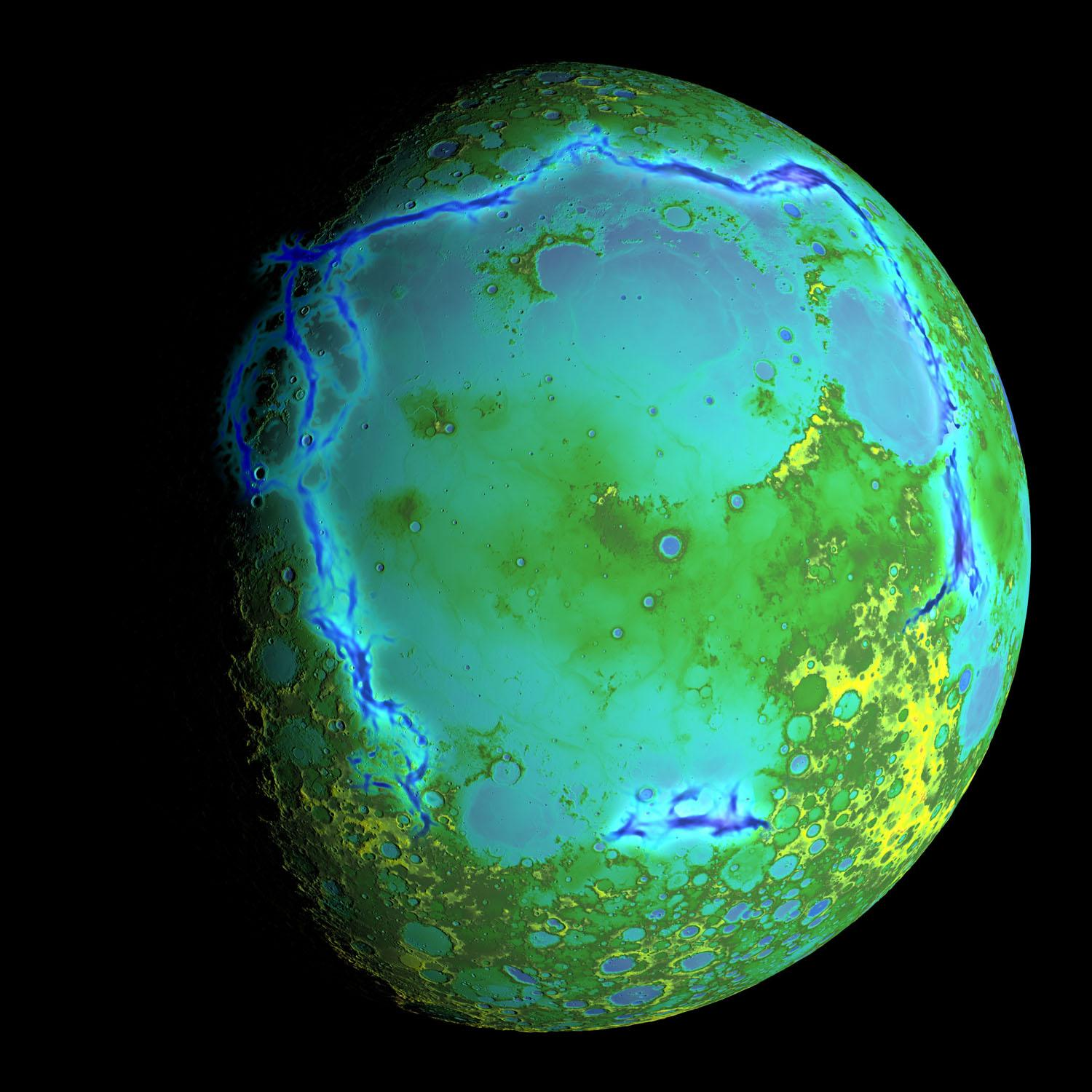
Ancient rift valleys – context.

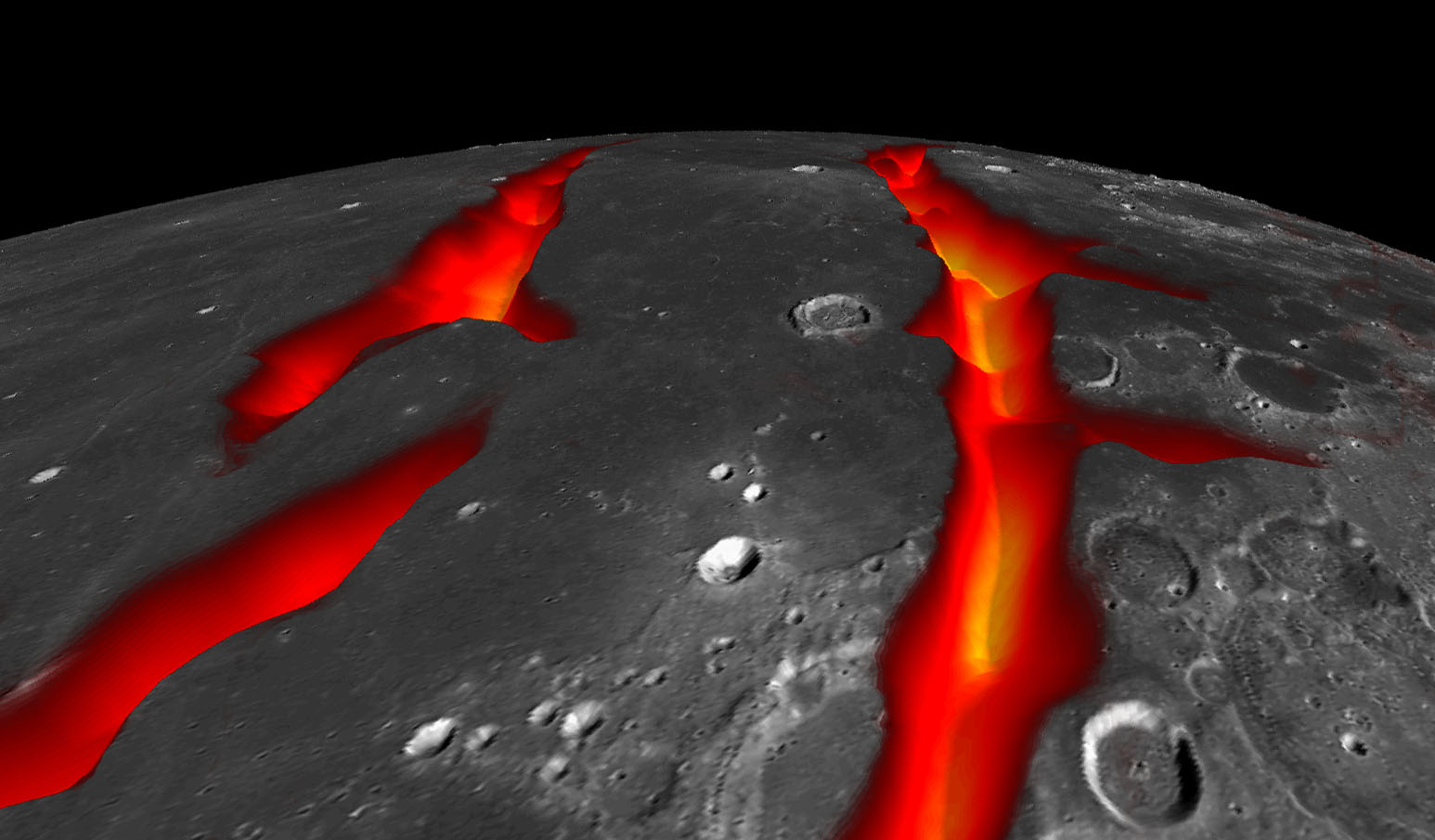
Ancient rift valleys – closeup (artist's concept).

== Differences ==
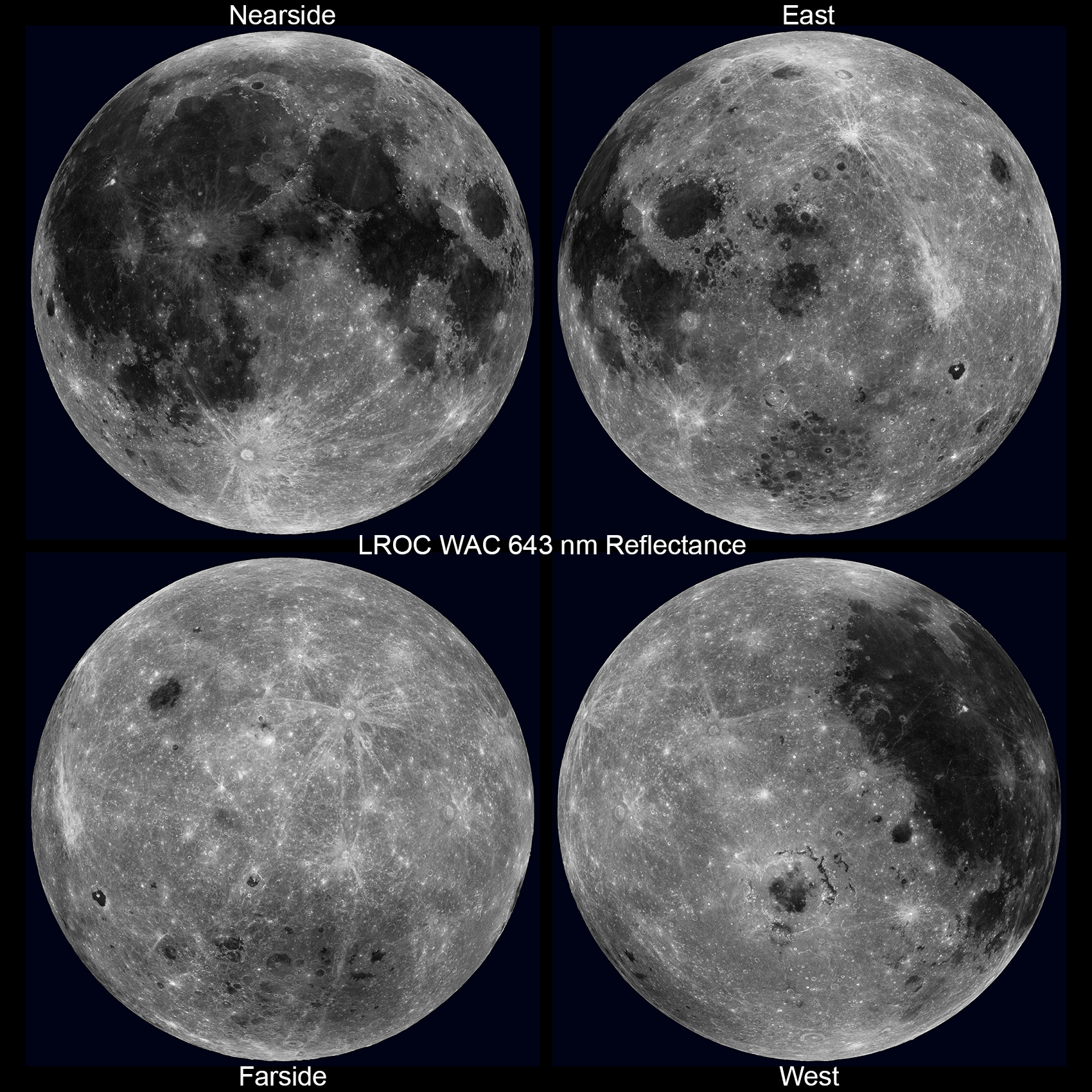
Changing landscape between the hemispheres

The two hemispheres have distinctly different appearances, with the near side covered in multiple, large maria (Latin for 'seas'). These lowlands were believed to be seas of lunar water by the astronomers who first mapped them, in the 17th century (notably, Giovanni Battista Riccioli and Francesco Maria Grimaldi). Although no bodies of liquid exist on the Moon, the term mare (pl. maria) is still used.

The far side has a battered, densely cratered appearance with few maria. Only 1% of the surface of the far side is covered by maria, compared to 31.2% on the near side. According to research analyzed by NASA's Gravity Recovery and Interior Laboratory (GRAIL) mission, the reason for the difference is that the lunar crust on the near side is thinner than that on the far side.

The dark splotches that make up the large lunar maria are lava-filled impact basins that were created by asteroid impacts about four billion years ago. Though both sides of the Moon were bombarded by similarly large impactors, the near side hemisphere crust and upper mantle was hotter than that of the far side, resulting in the larger impact craters. These larger impact craters make up the Man in the Moon references from popular mythology.

== Near side of Earth ==
While Earth is not tidally locked to the Moon, and therefore does not keep the same face turned to the Moon, Earth has a "near side" to the Moon, featuring a "near side" (or sublunar) tidal bulge oriented to the Moon.

== See also ==
- Giant impact hypothesis
- Lists of astronomical objects
- Moon rabbit
